= Aileen Cannon =

American federal judge (born 1981)

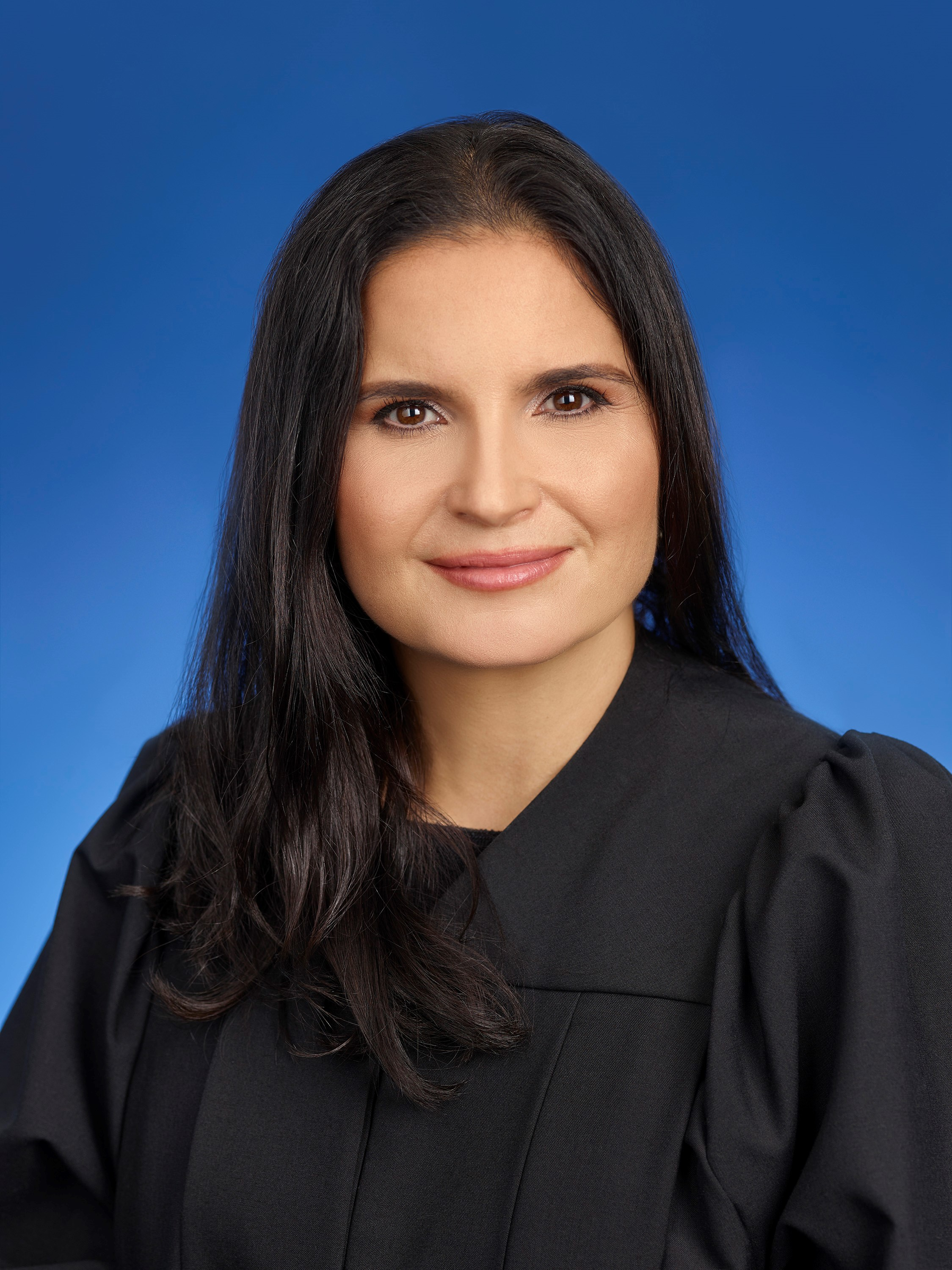

Judge of the United States District Court for the Southern District of Florida
- Incumbent
- Assumed office November 13, 2020
- Appointed by: Donald Trump
- Preceded by: Kenneth Marra

Personal details
- Born: Aileen Mercedes Cannon; 1981 (age 44–45) Cali, Colombia
- Party: Republican
- Education: Duke University (BA); University of Michigan (JD)

Aileen Mercedes Cannon (born 1981) is an American lawyer and jurist serving as a United States district judge of the United States District Court for the Southern District of Florida. She was appointed in 2020 by President Donald Trump and confirmed by the United States Senate. Cannon previously worked for the corporate law firm Gibson Dunn from 2009 to 2012 and was a federal prosecutor in the Southern District of Florida from 2013 to 2020.

In 2022, Cannon presided over the case of Donald J. Trump v. United States of America. She ordered the U.S. government to pause using materials seized from Trump's private club and residence in its investigation and granted Trump's request for a special master to review the material. The United States Court of Appeals for the Eleventh Circuit reversed and rebuked Cannon after it found she had wrongly exercised jurisdiction over the case. Cannon then dismissed Trump's lawsuit per orders from the Eleventh Circuit.

Following Trump's indictment in June 2023, Cannon oversaw a federal criminal case against Trump. Many legal experts, citing her handling of the civil case against Trump, called for her recusal from the case. Under Cannon, the case was considerably delayed from getting to trial, with Cannon granting multiple requests by Trump to extend pre-trial motions. In July 2024, she dismissed the case entirely, ruling that special counsel Jack Smith's appointment was unconstitutional. The ruling was appealed, but the appeal was dropped after Trump became president.

Cannon's rulings have received considerable media attention, with many legal experts criticizing her decisions and alleging bias over her handling of Trump's legal cases.

== Early life and education ==
Cannon was born in 1981 in Cali, Colombia. She has an elder sister. Her mother had fled Cuba as a girl after the Cuban Revolution of the 1950s, and her father is from Indiana. Cannon grew up in Miami, Florida, where she attended Ransom Everglades School, a private school.

Cannon graduated from Duke University in 2003 with a Bachelor of Arts. In college, she studied for a semester in Spain and wrote for Miami's Spanish language newspaper El Nuevo Herald; her writings included topics such as flamenco dancing, festivals, and yoga. Cannon then attended the University of Michigan Law School, where she was an articles editor for the University of Michigan Journal of Law Reform and was a quarter-finalist in the school's moot court competition. She graduated in 2007 with a Juris Doctor, magna cum laude, along with membership in the Order of the Coif.

Cannon has been a member of the conservative and libertarian Federalist Society since 2005, when she was a law student. While being considered for the position of a district judge in 2020, Cannon explained that she joined the Federalist Society because of a "diversity of viewpoints" and also because she "found interesting the organization's discussions about the constitutional separation of powers, the rule of law, and the limited role of the judiciary to say what the law is—not to make the law".

== Career ==
From 2008 to 2009, Cannon served as a law clerk for Judge Steven Colloton of the United States Court of Appeals for the Eighth Circuit in Iowa. From 2009 to 2012, she was an associate at the Washington, D.C., office of the corporate law firm Gibson Dunn. In one case in 2011, Cannon defended the former leader of the fixed income desk of Thomas Weisel Partners, before the Financial Industry Regulatory Authority; the former leader was cleared of fraud in the case.

From 2013 to 2020, Cannon was an assistant United States attorney for the Southern District of Florida. As a federal prosecutor, Cannon worked in the major crimes division, which included working on drug, firearm, and immigration cases, then moved to the appellate division, working on convictions and sentencings. In 2018, Cannon was part of the prosecution that won an appellate case involving Mutual Benefits Corporation's former lawyer Anthony Livoti Jr., reaffirming his 10-year sentence for fraud related to insurance investment. In 2019, Cannon was part of the prosecution that won an appellate case involving Scott W. Rothstein, which allowed prosecutors to withdraw support for reducing his 50-year sentence for a Ponzi scheme. As a prosecutor, Cannon helped secure convictions for 41 defendants, of which four convictions were from jury trials.

Cannon has participated in at least three events funded by George Mason University, a conservative law school, which she did not disclose as required. These included legal colloquia at Sage Lodge in Pray, Montana in 2021 and 2022 and a banquet in 2023.

=== Federal judicial service ===
In June 2019, the office of Senator Marco Rubio indicated to Cannon that he was considering her for the United States district judge position. Cannon expressed interest that month and subsequently was interviewed by representatives for Senator Rubio and Senator Rick Scott, as well as White House and Justice Department legal officials.

On May 21, 2020, at age 39, Cannon was nominated by President Donald Trump to serve as a United States district judge of the United States District Court for the Southern District of Florida. She was nominated to the seat left vacant by Judge Kenneth Marra, who assumed senior status on August 1, 2017. The American Bar Association rated Cannon as "Qualified" for the position. The American Bar Association required at least 12 years of law practice as one of their approval criteria, and Cannon met that standard. While being vetted by the Senate Judiciary Committee, Cannon described her judicial philosophy as originalist and textualist.

On July 29, 2020, a hearing was held before the United States Judiciary Committee. Law360 reported that Cannon "avoided scrutiny" during her July 2020 Senate confirmation hearing as the senators "took it easy" on her. The hearing featured five judicial nominees, with Republican senators focused on questioning J. Philip Calabrese and Democratic senators focused on questioning Toby Crouse. Afterward, Democratic senators sent Cannon many follow-up questions to answer.

On September 17, 2020, her nomination was reported out of committee by a 16–6 vote. On November 12, 2020, the United States Senate invoked cloture on her nomination by a 57–21 vote. Later that day, Cannon was confirmed by a 56–21 vote. She received her commission on November 13, 2020.

In May 2024, NPR reported that Cannon had violated internal judiciary rules and federal ethics law when she did not timely disclose that in 2021 and 2022, she was privately reimbursed when attending two legal seminars ("Sage Lodge Colloquium") at a luxury resort in Montana organized by George Mason University, and only disclosed it when NPR enquired about the matter; Cannon's court clerk responded by blaming the missing information on "inadvertent" technical issues. Cannon was reimbursed by the university's Antonin Scalia Law School, which has been described by The New York Times as an intended paragon of "conservative legal scholarship and influence".

According to ABC News, Cannon's name was on a list of possible candidates for United States Attorney General if Donald Trump was victorious in the 2024 presidential election. She is a possible contender for nomination to the United States Supreme Court if a vacancy on the Court occurs during the second presidency of Donald Trump.

=== Notable cases ===
It was reported in June 2021 that Cannon ordered Swiss cement company LafargeHolcim to reach a settlement to compensate an American family under the Helms-Burton Act for using the family's property in Cuba, which had been seized by the Cuban government in 1960. Before Cannon's order, no one had managed to secure compensation under the Helms-Burton Act for business property confiscated in Cuba.

In the case of Christopher Tavorris Wilkins, a 34-year-old man from Palm Beach Gardens who, in court, threw a chair at and threatened to kill a federal prosecutor, Cannon in April 2022 added six and a half years of imprisonment to his existing 17.5 year sentence for gun charges.

In the case of Paul Vernon Hoeffer, a 60-year-old man from Palm Beach Gardens who pleaded guilty to making death threats against three Democrats: Speaker of the House Nancy Pelosi, Representative Alexandria Ocasio-Cortez, and prosecutor Kim Foxx, with federal sentencing guidelines recommending 33 and 41 months in prison, and prosecutors proposing 41 months, Cannon in April 2022 sentenced Hoeffer to only 18 months in prison and then three years of supervised release, and also fined him just $2,000.

In the case of Juan Antonio Garcia, a 31-year-old former Sewall's Point police officer, Cannon in July 2022 sentenced him to 25 years in federal prison, a further 20 years of supervision, and a $10,000 fine for soliciting sex from a teenage boy. Sentencing guidelines imposed a range of between 15 years in prison to a life sentence, while federal prosecutors requested over 30 years imprisonment.

In the ongoing 18 month-long case of United States v. Carver, Cannon has presided over a complex, multi-defendant health care fraud case in which she has had to rule on issues of attorney-client privilege, defense attempts to suppress evidence or have charges dismissed, and motions to limit the scope of witness testimony. She has generally ruled in the prosecution's favor in each of these matters.

In a 2023 federal trial of an Alabama man accused of running a child pornography website, Cannon closed the jury selection to the public on the basis of space restrictions and also failed to swear in the jury. This was described as "a fundamental constitutional error" by legal experts. According to court transcripts from June 12, 2023, Cannon was repeatedly asked by both prosecutors and the defense attorney to open the courtroom. The public defense attorney objected to closing the courtroom, arguing that doing so violates the Sixth Amendment to the Constitution, which Cannon overruled. She was forced to restart the jury selection process before the trial ended in a plea bargain without the jury deliberating. The courtroom in which this took place is the same one in which the 2024 criminal trial United States v. Trump was set to take place, which prompted concern from one legal scholar about how Cannon would handle space restrictions.

Cannon presided over the trial of Ryan Wesley Routh, a North Carolina man who attempted to assassinate Trump in West Palm Beach. She sentenced Routh to life imprisonment on February 4, 2026.

==== Trump v. United States, civil case ====
Cannon heard the case of Trump v. United States (2022), which began on August 22, 2022, when former US president Donald Trump asked the court to appoint a special master to review materials seized during the FBI search of Mar-a-Lago earlier that month. On August 27, before hearing argument from the Justice Department, Cannon declared her "preliminary intent" to appoint a special master. Two days later, the Justice Department told Cannon it had already completed its review of materials that could have fallen under attorney–client privilege.

On September 5, 2022, Cannon granted Trump's request for a special master to review the seized materials for attorney-client privilege and executive privilege and ordered the Justice Department to stop using the seized material in its investigation until the special master's review was complete or until a further court order. In her ruling, Cannon cited exceptional "stigma associated with the subject seizure", since Trump was a former president, as well as the potential for great "reputational harm" from any future indictment based on "property that ought to be returned".

Legal experts, including University of California law professor Orin Kerr, University of Texas School of Law professor Steve Vladeck, and George Mason University professor Mark J. Rozell, voiced surprise at Cannon's ruling or found it problematic. Law360 eventually named this case one of ten "major legal ethics cases" of 2022, with Cannon having "appeared particularly concerned with Trump's personal interests", and in an "ill-suited" move, she allowed the usage of executive privilege "to shield materials between different parts of the executive branch", leading to "howls from various corners of the legal establishment".

The Justice Department had appealed to Cannon to allow their investigation into seized classified-marked documents to continue and had appealed to Cannon to exempt such documents from the special master's review, but Cannon rejected this on September 15 and refused due to "ongoing factual and legal disputes" to accept the government's claims that the documents were classified "without further review by a neutral third party". This is especially significant since Trump's lawyers had not claimed in any court proceeding that the documents were declassified. Furthermore, Cannon rejected the Justice Department's argument that Trump's possession of the material risked "imminent disclosure of classified information". She cited "leaks to the media after the underlying seizure" of the documents, without specifying what sources might have been responsible for the leaks.

On September 21, 2022, the Eleventh Circuit stayed portions of Cannon's ruling, allowing around 100 classified documents to be used in the Justice Department's investigation and rescinding the requirement for the special master to review the classified documents. The appeals court stated that under Cannon "the district court abused its discretion in exercising equitable jurisdiction" over the case chiefly because of Cannon's own conclusion that Trump "did not show that the United States acted in callous disregard of his constitutional rights", which was a critical factor in determining jurisdiction. Furthermore, while Cannon ruled that Trump had an interest in some of the seized documents, the appeals court found that this did not apply to the classified documents and that under Cannon "the district court made no mention" of why or how Trump "might have an individual interest in or need for the classified documents", which was another factor in determining jurisdiction. The panel stated that there is "no evidence that any of these records were declassified" and that in any case "the declassification argument is a red herring" that does not establish Trump's "personal interest" in the documents even if they were declassified.

On September 29, Cannon overruled procedures proposed by the special master she had appointed, senior federal judge Raymond Dearie, who had been nominated by Trump's legal team. Instead, Cannon agreed with Trump's legal team on multiple issues and set procedures including extending the deadline for the review.

On December 1, the Eleventh Circuit ordered the case to be dismissed because Cannon "improperly exercised equitable jurisdiction" over it. The Eleventh Circuit stated that Trump needed to show that the case met all four criteria under the Richey test for equitable jurisdiction over lawsuits for seized materials but failed to do so for any criteria. The Eleventh Circuit found that under Cannon "the district court stepped in with its own reasoning" multiple times to argue in favor of Trump, sometimes even taking positions that Trump did not argue before the appeals court. The Eleventh Circuit also found that when Trump did not explain what materials he still needed to return, or why, the "district court was undeterred by this lack of information".

The National Law Journal wrote that the Eleventh Circuit's decision "reads as a rebuke of" Cannon, with New York University law professor Peter M. Shane commenting that "[i]f an appellate court tells a lower court that we can only accept your judgment by betraying one of the nation's founding principles, that's a pretty strong rebuke." Duke University School of Law professor Samuel W. Buell opined on the case affecting Cannon's judicial legacy, stating that it "might end up being the most high-profile case she has in her career, so it's not going away", but the Eleventh Circuit's "opinion has her having been very wrong".

On December 8, the Eleventh Circuit ended the special master's review and permitted the government to use non-classified seized material in its investigation. On December 12, Cannon had Trump's case "dismissed for lack of jurisdiction", after the Eleventh Circuit instructed her to dismiss.

Cannon was the subject of ethics complaints over her handling of this case, but the complaints were dismissed in December 2022 by the Eleventh Circuit's chief judge, William Pryor.

Cannon allegedly received threats in September 2022. A woman from Houston was charged for allegedly leaving Cannon voicemails that stated that the caller was "Donald Trump's hitman, so consider it a bullet from Donald Trump himself" and also stated that "[y]ou’re helping him, ma’am ... He's marked for assassination and so are you". The criminal complaint against the Houston woman stated that she appears to "suffer from severe mental impairments with symptoms including paranoia and delusions". On February 9, 2024, the woman pleaded guilty and was subject to 37 months in federal prison.

==== United States v. Trump, criminal case ====
Cannon was assigned in June 2023 to oversee the criminal case against former president Donald Trump. After an inquiry by The New York Times, the Southern District of Florida's chief clerk confirmed that the assignment was random. Several legal experts called for Cannon to recuse herself. Stephen Gillers, a professor emeritus at the New York University School of Law, opined that Cannon should recuse from the criminal case, as "her impartiality might reasonably be questioned", due to her being "partial to Trump as a former President" in the previous civil case. Richard Painter, Norman Eisen and Fred Wertheimer, former White House chief ethics lawyers and a good government advocate respectively, jointly called for Cannon's recusal, citing her conduct in the previous civil case, which they described as "fundamentally erroneous ... went well outside the judicial norm and was roundly criticized by the Court of Appeals". Laurence Tribe, a professor at Harvard Law School, opined that the "historic trial ... should be, and should be seen to be, entirely unbiased and legally sound", but Cannon being the judge "would cast a long shadow over" the trial. However, there was no indication that Cannon would recuse herself, and she soon began issuing orders related to the examination of evidence in the case.

This criminal case arose from the investigation into his handling of government documents, which was the subject of a civil case against Trump that Cannon coincidentally previously presided over. In June 2023, The New York Times analysed records by Bloomberg Law of Cannon's handling of criminal cases as a federal judge, finding that before Trump's criminal case, she had presided over 224 criminal cases, of which only four criminal cases went to trial, with a cumulative 14 trial days. However Politico noted that the ongoing Carver case, slated for trial in July 2023, featured many of the kinds of pretrial motions and procedures that this case would be expected to see.

In late June 2023, Cannon ruled against the Department of Justice, denying its request to keep the identities of 84 potential witnesses under seal. In August 2023, Cannon ruled in favor of Trump on the issue of potential conflicts of interest regarding co-defendant Walt Nauta's lawyer Stanley Woodward representation of possible witnesses in the case. She rejected the notion that sealed filings were required "to comport with grand jury secrecy", striking two sealed filings by prosecutors from the court record. Instead, Cannon instructed Woodward and prosecutors to discuss "the legal propriety of using an out-of-district grand jury proceeding" to continue actions in this federal case. Several legal experts, including notable constitutional scholar Harvard Professor Laurence Tribe, as well as notable former federal prosecutors Andrew Weissmann and Joyce Vance, indicated that the propriety of the grand jury proceedings were obvious, and that Cannon's questioning of their propriety was alarming.

After Trump's legal team in September 2023 requested an extension to the case, Cannon delayed a crucial pre-trial hearing on the Classified Information Procedures Act (CIPA) from October 2023 to February 2024, while also ruling that she would only ponder on further scheduling in March 2024. While prosecutors asked for a CIPA hearing in March and the defense teams requested for June, Cannon decided in April that the new hearing date should be in May, but when that date approached, the defense teams again requested delay, so Cannon in May granted the defense teams' earlier request of June CIPA hearings. Politico reported that Cannon "has run the pretrial process at a leisurely pace that will make a postponement [of the scheduled May 2024 trial] almost inevitable, according to experts on criminal prosecutions related to classified information"; Politico further states that if the trial is postponed to after the 2024 United States presidential election, Trump could become president and would then be "expected" to instruct the Justice Department to end the case.

In February 2024, Cannon granted Trump's team's motion for the names of witnesses in this case and their testimony to be publicly revealed; this caused the government's prosecutors to ask Cannon to reconsider, citing "significant and immediate risks of threats, intimidation, and harassment" which has been seen in other Trump cases. In March 2024, a witness in the case ("Trump Employee 5") and former Mar-a-Lago employee, Brian Butler, identified himself in a media interview and told his story about the incident, citing that in preparation for Cannon's plan to publicize the witness names, he would rather tell his story than "just waiting for it to come out ... I think it's better to at least say what happened than it coming out in the news, people calling me crazy. I'd rather just get it out there." In April 2024, Cannon agreed to censor the potential witnesses' names, but not their statements, from the public; Politico wrote that it was the "latest decision in which Cannon has sided with prosecutors in an opinion that is primarily critical of their tactics", with Cannon criticizing prosecutors' speed, compliance and basis for their arguments.

In March 2024, Cannon denied without prejudice an attempt by Trump to dismiss the case. She wrote that Trump's team had raised "various arguments warranting serious consideration", then indicated that the Trump team's arguments about the Espionage Act being too vague could instead be brought up again later in "connection with jury-instruction briefing". After Trump's team argued that the Presidential Records Act allowed Trump to retain classified documents, Cannon instructed both prosecutors and Trump's team to craft hypothetical jury instructions regarding the Presidential Records Act, in an action that perplexed observing lawyers and former judges. Barbara McQuade, a law professor and former federal prosecutor, opined that the Presidential Records Act "is just not relevant here in any way it all; it provides no defense. To even allow it to be argued at trial would create confusion for the jury", while former federal judge Nancy Gertner commented that Cannon's instruction was "very troubling" because it was "giving credence to arguments that are on their face absurd". In April 2024, Cannon denied another motion by Trump to dismiss the case, stating that "the Presidential Records Act does not provide a pre-trial basis to dismiss", while criticizing as "unprecedented and unjust" the prosecutors' request for her to elaborate on whether her jury instructions would include the Presidential Records Act.

After the March 2024 hearing on postponing the May 20, 2024 trial, Cannon took until May 7, 2024, to issue an update on the matter. Cannon ruled to indefinitely postpone the trial, citing many pre-trial matters to settle. She accepted Trump's requests to have pre-trial hearings on the appropriateness of the appointment of the special counsel and the potential expansion of recognizing more government agencies as part of the prosecution, which would allow Trump to conduct the discovery process on them. Cannon scheduled pre-trial activities to continue up to July 22, 2024, at the earliest. It is "extraordinarily unlikely that there will be a trial before November", opined former CIA attorney Brian Greer, whose work focused on classified material.

At this point, The Guardian stated that Cannon has "generally given wide deference to Trump and his legal team, granting nearly all extensions they have requested and entertaining his most brazen defense theories, even if they have been without precedent in Espionage Act cases". Meanwhile, The New York Times stated that Cannon has "treated seriously arguments that many, if not most, federal judges would have rejected out of hand. Often, her acceptance of Mr. Trump's unorthodox claims have resulted in significant delays in bringing the charges in the classified documents case in front of a jury. The Washington Post wrote that while the "facts of the case do not favor former president Donald Trump", "Cannon has repeatedly accommodated Trump's position", and if "there were a judge who actively wanted to delay Trump's Florida trial … it's not clear what they might have done much differently".

While Donald Trump has continually denounced many of the judges presiding over his legal cases, including Tanya Chutkan, Arthur Engoron and Juan Merchan, he has not criticized Cannon. Instead, Trump has described Cannon as a "highly respected", "very smart", and "very strong judge". The Washington Post stated in May 2024 that Cannon's "rulings are generally hailed as uniquely wise" by Trump supporters, and she has "been celebrated by adherents of the QAnon movement". A Reuters investigation found that while Cannon received public criticism on left-leaning websites, this did not include calls for violence, which is contrasted with Trump supporters' calls for violence or death threats against judges that Trump has criticized.

After Trump in fundraising emails claimed that during the Mar-a-Lago raid, "Biden's DOJ was authorized to shoot me!" and that Biden was "locked & loaded ready to take me out", prosecutors requested for a gag order on Trump pertaining to law enforcement. Cannon in May 2024 responded by denying the prosecutors' request and instead accusing the prosecutors of being "wholly lacking in substance and professional courtesy" when discussing the issue with the defense team.

On June 20, 2024, The New York Times reported that shortly after being assigned the case, two federal judges in South Florida, including the chief judge, Cecilia Altonaga, privately urged Cannon to decline the case and pass it on to other jurists. However, Cannon had not taken their advice. Cannon was specifically advised to transfer the case to a jurist in Miami, where they already had a secure facility in which to store and review the sensitive documents, but she declined, and so a new facility had to be constructed at Fort Pierce, at taxpayers' expense.

On July 15, 2024, Cannon dismissed the case against Trump, ruling that "Special Counsel Smith’s appointment violates the Appointments Clause of the United States Constitution", with a rationale mirroring that of Supreme Court Justice Clarence Thomas' concurrence in a closely timed case involving Trump. Another decision that invited intense scrutiny from legal commentators and the general public alike, the dismissal incited calls from Monica Lewinsky for Congress to impeach Cannon. Following the re-election of Trump to the presidency, Ty Cobb referred to how the ruling could impact future dealings between Trump and the Department of Justice, referring to Cannon as Trump's "pet judge".

Trump won the November 2024 U.S. presidential election to secure a second term beginning January 20, 2025. Cannon on January 7, 2025 ordered Jack Smith, his subordinates, Attorney General Merrick Garland, and the Department of Justice not to release Smith's report on Trump's classified documents case until three days after the 11th Circuit ruled on whether the report could be released (unless the 11th Circuit ordered otherwise). Cannon intervened after Trump (no longer a defendant) and defendants Walt Nauta and Carlos De Oliveira urged her to block Smith's report. In reaction to Cannon's order, Trump responded that Cannon was a "brilliant judge with great courage". The 11th Circuit on January 9, 2025 declined to block the release of Smith's report.

On January 13, 2025, Cannon declined to block the release of Volume I of Smith's report beyond that day; Volume I describes Trump's actions after the 2020 election interfering with the peaceful transfer of power. Simultaneously, Cannon blocked the release of Volume II of Smith's report and arranged for a hearing on January 17; Volume II describes the classified documents case and the Department of Justice had proposed sharing it with some members of Congress. Trump again requested that Cannon block Volume I, but she rejected his request. In early November, an appeals court unanimously ruled that Cannon delay in ruling on motions to unblock the release of Volume II was "undue delay", and gave her 60 days to act.

On February 23, 2026, Cannon ruled that Smith's final report will not be released, arguing that "it is certainly not customary" for a prosecutor whose case was thrown out to later be allowed to "publicly disseminate large swaths of discovery generated in the case."

== Personal life ==
Cannon married restaurant executive Josh Lorence in 2008. They have two children and live in Vero Beach, Florida, as of 2022. Cannon is a registered Republican. She donated $100 to Ron DeSantis's gubernatorial campaign in 2018.

== See also ==
- List of Hispanic and Latino American jurists

Legal offices
Preceded by Kenneth Marra	Judge of the United States District Court for the Southern District of Florida; 2020–present	Incumbent
