= Federal prosecution of Donald Trump (classified documents case) =

2023–24 U.S. legal affair

United States v. Trump
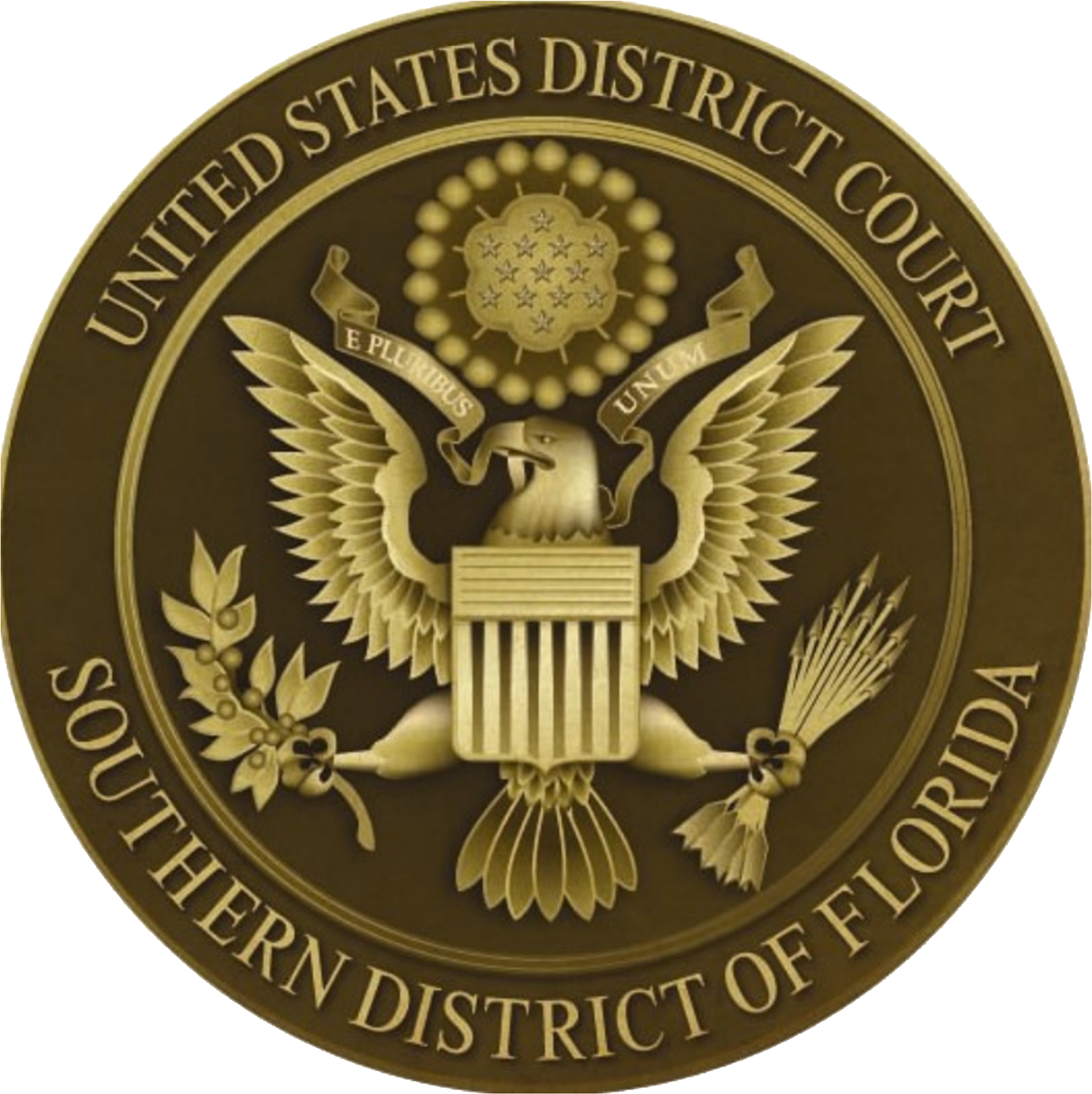
- Seal of the District Court for the Southern District of Florida
- Court: United States District Court for the Southern District of Florida
- Full case name: United States of America v. Donald J. Trump, Waltine Nauta, and Carlos De Oliveira
- Docket nos.: 9:23-cr-80101-AMC
- Charge: 40 against Trump; 8 against Nauta; 4 against de Oliveira: Willful retention of national defense information; False statements and representations; Conspiracy to obstruct justice; Withholding a document or record; Corruptly concealing a document or record; Concealing a document in a federal investigation; Scheme to conceal; Altering, destroying, mutilating, or concealing an object; Corruptly altering, destroying, mutilating, or concealing a document, record, or other object

Court membership
- Judge sitting: Aileen Cannon (District Judge)

United States of America v. Donald J. Trump, Waltine Nauta, and Carlos De Oliveira was a federal criminal case against Donald Trump, the 45th president of the United States; Walt Nauta, his personal aide and valet; and Mar-a-Lago maintenance chief Carlos De Oliveira. The grand jury indictment brought 40 felony counts against Trump related to his alleged mishandling of classified documents after his first presidency, to which he pleaded not guilty. The case marked the first federal indictment of a former U.S. president.

On June 8, 2023, the original indictment with 37 felony counts against Trump was filed in the federal district court in Miami by the office of the special counsel, Jack Smith. On July 27, a superseding indictment charged an additional three felonies against Trump. Trump was charged separately for each of 32 documents under the Espionage Act. The other eight charges against him included making false statements and engaging in a conspiracy to obstruct justice. The most serious charges against Trump and Nauta carried a maximum penalty of 20 years in prison. There were no mandatory minimum penalties.

Trump was arraigned on June 13, 2023, Nauta was arraigned on July 12, and both were arraigned on additional charges on August 10. De Oliveira was arraigned on August 15 on four criminal counts related to an alleged attempt to delete surveillance footage. All pleaded not guilty to all charges. Though Judge Aileen Cannon initially set trial for May 20, 2024, she postponed it and then dismissed the case on July 15, ruling that the appointment of Smith had been unconstitutional.

Though the special counsel appealed the dismissal, it later chose to wind down the case following Trump's election in November 2024, in part due to its long-standing department policy not to prosecute a sitting president. It abandoned its appeal regarding Trump (which the court dismissed without prejudice on November 25) and the Department of Justice asked the court to dismiss its case regarding Nauta and de Oliveira (dismissed with prejudice on January 29, 2025).

After Trump took office for the second time, the Department of Justice returned to him the boxes that the FBI had seized in August 2022. On February 28, 2025, Trump brought the boxes to Mar-a-Lago.

== Background ==
Under the Presidential Records Act (PRA), presidential documents must be transferred to the National Archives and Records Administration (NARA) by the end of a president's term. Trump's term ended in January 2021. In May 2021, NARA became aware of missing documents from the Trump administration, and began an effort to retrieve documents improperly taken to Trump's residences at Mar-a-Lago and The Bedminster Club. Later, the Federal Bureau of Investigation (FBI) obtained evidence that Trump was personally involved in causing the documents to be taken. Some of the stolen documents were, as Representative Jamie Raskin wrote, "so sensitive that only six people in the entire U.S. government had access to them" and furthermore "pertained to his [Trump's] business interests".

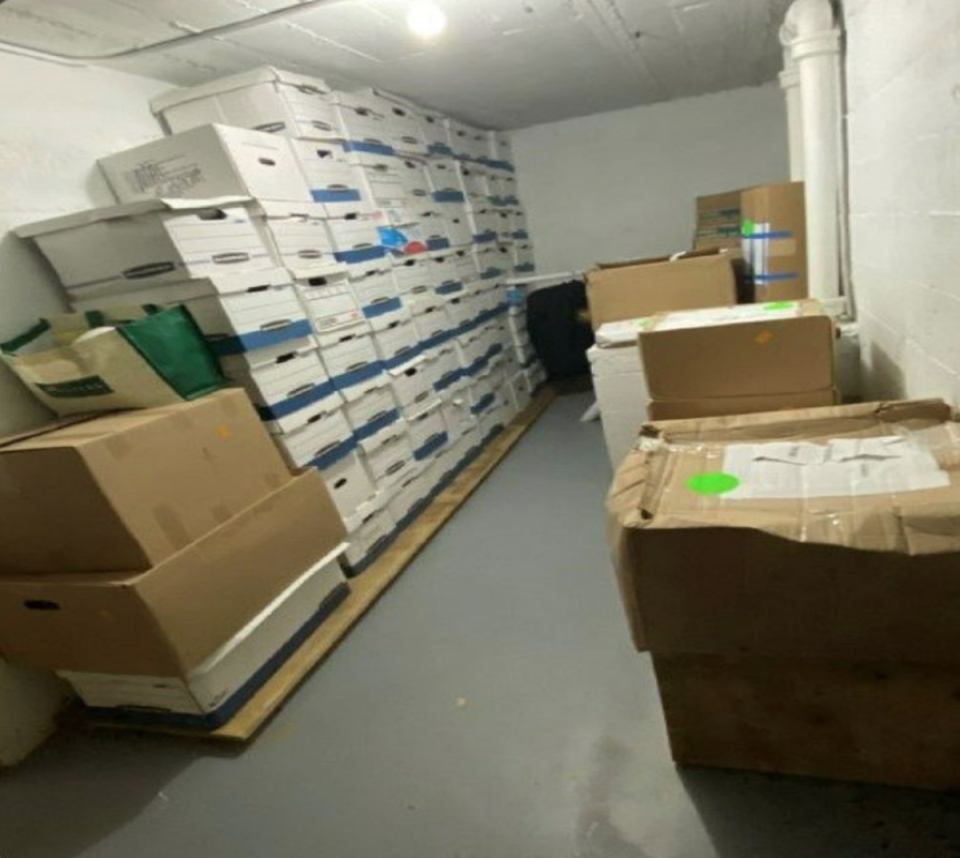
Storage room with document boxes at Mar-a-Lago

After repeatedly demanding the return of documents from Trump's team and warning them of a possible referral to the Justice Department, NARA retrieved 15 boxes of documents in January 2022. NARA discovered that the boxes contained classified material, and notified the Justice Department on February 9. This led the FBI to launch an investigation into Trump's handling of government documents on March 30. In May, a grand jury issued a subpoena for any remaining documents in Trump's possession. Trump certified that he was returning all the remaining documents on June 3, but the FBI later obtained evidence that he had intentionally moved documents to hide them from his lawyers and the FBI and thus had not fulfilled the subpoena.

This led to the FBI search of Mar-a-Lago on August 8, 2022, in which the FBI recovered over 13,000 government documents, over 300 of which were classified, with some relating to national defense secrets covered under the Espionage Act. The civil lawsuit Trump v. United States arose from the search, which briefly led to the appointment of a special master by District Judge Aileen Cannon to review seized materials. Cannon's ruling was later overturned.

In a November 2, 2022 interview with the FBI, a former Trump White House employee said that Nauta had been promised a pardon, "even if he gets charged with lying to the FBI", should Trump regain the presidency.

In November 2022, the FBI investigation was taken over by a special counsel investigation, under the direction of Jack Smith who was appointed by Attorney General Merrick Garland. A second civil case allowed the Smith investigation to make use of the crime-fraud exception to attorney–client privilege to access certain evidence in the case.

In March 2023, the FBI initiated contact with Brian Butler, a 20-year-employee of Mar-a-Lago and longtime close friend of De Oliveira. Butler had helped move boxes of documents, not realizing what type of documents were inside nor others' intent to hide them. He provided information to investigators about the actions of De Oliveira and Nauta.

In March 2023, Judge Beryl Howell wrote: "Notably, no excuse is provided as to how the former president could miss the classified-marked documents found in his own bedroom at Mar-a-Lago." Howell was referring to additional documents that Trump's attorneys found in his office and bedroom at Mar-a-Lago months after the FBI search, including a "mostly empty" folder marked as "Classified Evening Summary".

== Indictments and arraignments ==
=== Original indictment ===
Special Counsel Jack Smith delivers remarks announcing the indictment.

The grand jury handed up the indictment under seal on June 8, 2023. The indictment was unsealed the following day, and special counsel Jack Smith gave a brief statement emphasizing the seriousness of the charges and stating that his office would seek a speedy trial. In the court where the defendants were arraigned, scheduling trial within 70 days of a criminal indictment would normally be considered "speedy", but the Classified Information Procedures Act (CIPA) applies, and those required procedures may take additional time. As the Guardian explains, "the seven-stage Cipa process is sequential, meaning each previous section has to be completed before the case can proceed to the next section."

The indictment

Its 37 counts against Trump and six against Walt Nauta include willfully retaining national defense information in violation of the Espionage Act, making false statements, obstruction of justice, and conspiracy to obstruct justice. The conspiracy to obstruct justice charge carries a penalty of up to 20 years in prison; violations of the Espionage Act carry a penalty of up to 10 years in prison. There are no mandatory minimum penalties.

Trump (37 counts):

- 31 counts of retaining and failing to deliver national defense documents under the Espionage Act.

Each of these charges is for possession of a separate, specific document. Ten of these documents were handed over to the government in June 2022, and the other 21 were recovered in the August 2022 search. According to the indictment, the 31 documents describe U.S. nuclear weapons; foreign military attacks, plans, capabilities, and effects on U.S. interests; foreign nuclear capabilities; foreign support for terrorist activity; communications with foreign leaders; U.S. military activities; White House daily foreign intelligence briefings; potential vulnerabilities of the United States and its allies to military attack; and plans for possible retaliation in response to a foreign attack.

- 5 counts relating to conspiracy to obstruct justice and withholding documents and records
- 1 count of making false statements.

Nauta (6 counts):

- 5 counts relating to conspiracy to obstruct justice and withholding documents and records
- 1 count of making false statements.

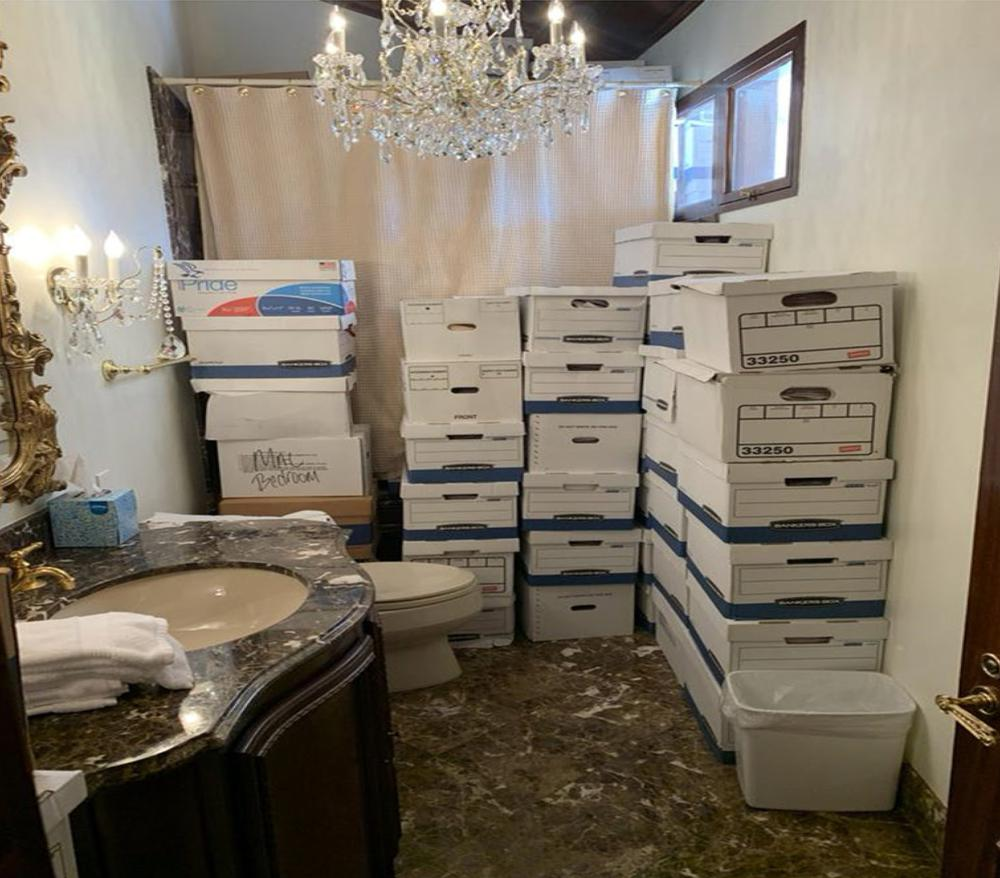
Boxes of documents found in a Mar-a-Lago bathroom by the FBI

The indictment included photographs showing boxes containing classified information in "a ballroom, a bathroom and shower, an office space, his bedroom and a storage room" at Trump's Florida home. Boxes containing classified materials were stored on a stage in the White and Gold ballroom, where events took place, from January to March 2021, before being moved to the Mar-a-Lago business center.

It included transcripts of an audio recording it says are of Trump showing a classified U.S. military attack plan (the name of the target country is redacted) to a book publisher, writer, and two staff members in July 2021, while saying he was unable to declassify the document. News reports said the target country was Iran that and Trump was showing the document to the writers while complaining that General Mark Milley, Chairman of the Joint Chiefs of Staff, had unfairly portrayed him to the media. Milley later told a journalist: "Our job is to render advice. We have plans for all kinds of things ... Not one time have I ever recommended to attack Iran."

Originally, the indictment alleged that in fall 2021, Trump showed a classified military map to a representative of his political action committee (PAC) (later identified in the press as Susie Wiles, CEO of his Save America PAC) who did not have a security clearance, and that Trump acted to keep classified documents he knew he could not be in possession of because they had been subpoenaed. However, on June 10, 2024, Judge Cannon ordered that the paragraph about the map be removed from the indictment. She said it was unnecessary since Trump was not being charged for the alleged map incident.

=== Superseding indictment ===
Shortly after Trump and Nauta's original indictment in June, a target letter was sent to Yuscil Taveras, the director of information technology at Mar-a-Lago who oversees the surveillance cameras. At first, Taveras was represented by attorney Stanley Woodward, whose legal fees were paid for by Trump's Save America PAC to represent Taveras and a number of Trump allies. While represented by Woodward, Taveras provided testimony to the grand jury. On July 5, after being told that Woodward might have a conflict of interest, Taveras notified the court he wished to drop Woodward as his attorney and to switch to a public defender. Taveras then retracted his previous testimony and provided new information regarding a plot to delete surveillance video at the Florida property that implicated Trump and others. This led to a superseding indictment in which Taveras was not charged. He agreed to testify for the prosecution.

On July 27, a superseding indictment was filed, charging an additional defendant, Carlos De Oliveira, the maintenance chief at Mar-a-Lago, and adding new counts for Trump and Nauta. In the new indictment, all three defendants face two counts related to the attempt to delete the surveillance footage:

- "Altering, destroying, mutilating, or concealing an object" (Title 18 USC Sections 1512(b)(2)(B) and 2)
- "Corruptly altering, destroy, mutilating or concealing a document, record, or other object" (Title 18 USC Section 1512(c)(1))

In the new indictment, Trump also faces an additional count of willful retention of national defense information under the Espionage Act. The 32nd document is the Iran document he referenced in the July 2021 conversation. The indictment says that he possessed it until January 17, 2022, so it may have been inside the 15 boxes of material he voluntarily surrendered to NARA that month (before the subpoenas and search).

Charging Trump with these three new counts brings his total number of counts to 40.

=== Assignment of district judge ===
Federal judge Aileen Cannon, who was appointed to the bench by Trump in 2020, was randomly assigned to preside over the case. Shortly after her assignment in June 2023, two federal judges urged her to step down, but she did not.

Cannon had previously made unprecedented rulings favorable to Trump in 2022, particularly in appointing a special master to review seized documents, which temporarily stymied the FBI and special counsel investigations. The rulings were criticized by legal scholars, and a panel of the conservative U.S. Court of Appeals for the Eleventh Circuit unanimously overruled them, writing, "We cannot write a rule that allows any subject of a search warrant to block government investigations after the execution of the warrant. Nor can we write a rule that allows only former presidents to do so."

=== Arraignments ===
Trump arrived in Miami the day before his arraignment at the Wilkie D. Ferguson Jr. U.S. Courthouse and had dinner at his golf club in Doral with his lawyer Christopher Kise; Nauta; Nauta's Washington DC lawyer Stanley Woodward; right-wing activist and President of Judicial Watch Tom Fitton; and other advisers.

==== Trump ====
At his June 13 arraignment, Trump pleaded not guilty to all 37 counts. Trump and Nauta were both released. Trump was instructed not to speak about the case to any of the 84 witnesses, including Nauta, who continues to be Trump's personal assistant. Trump was represented by Todd Blanche, a former assistant U.S. attorney in the Manhattan federal prosecutor's office who is also representing him in his prosecution by the Manhattan district attorney. (Trump attorneys Jim Trusty [wd] and John Rowley [wd] had resigned the day after the indictment.) At the arraignment, Blanche entered the plea on Trump's behalf. At Trump's arraignment, Miami police had prepared for up to 50,000 protestors, though only 500 protestors came.

Trump is also represented in the matter by Lindsey Halligan. Halligan is the local counsel for the case and filed the Motions to Appear Pro Hac Vice for Evan Corcoran and James Trusty, initially on August 22, 2022. She was one of the few lawyers working for Trump who was on site during the FBI search, which she said was a "huge surprise". She said Trump's subsequent indictment goes "for the jugular".

On August 4, in a court filing, Trump pleaded not guilty to the three new counts. He told the court he would not appear in person for the arraignment. At the August 10 arraignment, the judge formally accepted the plea he had submitted.

==== Nauta ====
On June 13, Nauta appeared in court, but he could not be arraigned because his lawyer was not eligible to represent him in Florida. On July 6, Nauta, having hired a Florida lawyer, Sasha Dadan, pleaded not guilty. On August 10, he appeared in court again and pleaded not guilty to the added charges.

==== De Oliveira ====
On July 31, De Oliveira appeared in court and was released on $100,000 bond. He was represented by John Irving, whose firm had been paid nearly $200,000 by Trump's Save America PAC. His arraignment was delayed because he did not have a Florida lawyer. He was arraigned on August 15 and pleaded not guilty.

== Pretrial proceedings ==
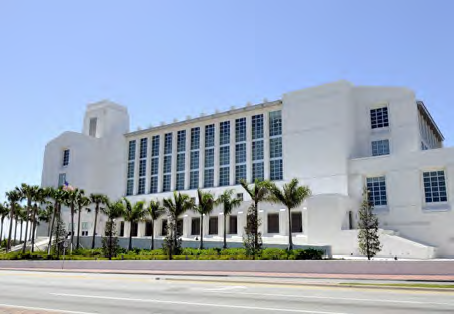
Post-arraignment proceedings are being held at the Alto Lee Adams Sr. U.S. Courthouse in Fort Pierce, Florida.

The trial will involve procedures under the Classified Information Procedures Act. Under that act, the government plans to share classified documents relevant to the case with the defense as part of discovery. On June 19, a judge issued a protective order that restricted Trump to viewing the relevant documents under his attorneys' supervision and explicitly prohibited him from publicly discussing the evidence, as DOJ had requested three days earlier.

=== 2023 ===
By the third week of June, the government began disclosing unclassified evidence to the defense as part of the discovery process. That includes documents obtained via warrants and subpoenas; transcripts of witness testimony before the grand jury; witness interviews; and copies of the videorecordings from Mar-a-Lago. The government's first discovery disclosure to the defense included at least 833,450 pages of material, including emails and other documents; of this set, about 4,500 pages were designated as "key" documents, the most crucial evidence.

On July 18, lawyers for Trump and Nauta attended the first pretrial conference, while Trump went to Iowa for a televised campaign event with Sean Hannity. Several days later, the judge set another pretrial hearing for May 14, 2024.

On August 22, prosecutors made a court filing asking whether Stanley Woodward may have a conflict of interest if he has to cross-examine Taveras, who was formerly his client. At an October 12 hearing, Cannon complained that prosecutors had introduced new arguments during oral argument and said she would potentially schedule further hearings about the matter in the future.

Following a September 12 hearing (postponed from August 25), Cannon prohibited Trump from commenting on classified evidence.

Earlier in 2023, in a different case, Cannon closed jury selection to the public on the basis that the courtroom was too small, which according to some was a constitutional error. Trump's trial was scheduled for the same courtroom.

In November, it was reported that Mar-a-Lago staff, including the person who cleaned Trump's bedroom, may be called to testify.

=== 2024 ===
On February 6, 2024, Cannon ruled that witnesses' names could be made public, as the government had not explained its concerns related to "witness safety and intimidation". Two days later, the government asked her to reconsider. On April 9, Cannon ruled that witnesses in the case could remain private, reversing her prior decision. However, Cannon also did turn down a request seeking the sealing of substantive witness statements.

On February 12, Trump attended a hearing to determine whether prosecutors could withhold some classified evidence from the defense. The hearing was closed-door and in a sensitive compartmented information facility (SCIF).

On February 22, Trump's lawyers made multiple court filings asking for the case to be dismissed. On March 14, Cannon heard two of these motions, and she immediately rejected Trump's request to dismiss the case based on his claim that the Espionage Act was vague, though she is open to hearing his arguments about the law's vagueness as part of the case. Trump's second claim was that a president may keep any government documents he wishes under the Presidential Records Act.

On April 4, Cannon denied Trump's motion to dismiss the indictment. Trump had claimed that a president, under the Presidential Records Act, may keep any government documents he wishes. Cannon ruled that the Presidential Records Act provides no "basis to dismiss" the charges.

On May 6, Cannon delayed a major deadline for the defendants to submit court filings (which had been set for May 9). She did this after it was revealed that prosecutors had shuffled the order of documents within each box while reviewing the boxes. As prosecutors acknowledged in writing: "The filter team took care to ensure that no documents were moved from one box to another, but it was not focused on maintaining the sequence of documents within each box." Trump attorney Todd Blanche described this as "the spoliation of this evidence" and said that prosecutors had committed an ethical breach by not revealing it promptly.

On May 7, Cannon canceled the May 20 trial date and wrote that it would be "imprudent and inconsistent" to finalize a new trial date before resolving pretrial issues. She issued a new pretrial schedule, under which defendants' motions to dismiss will be heard May 22 and June 21, there is a CIPA deadline on June 17 (delayed from May 9), defendants’ combined speedy trial report will be due July 19, and a status conference and a CIPA hearing will be held on July 22.

On May 22, a new pre-trial hearing was held concerning motions to dismiss brought forth by Nauta on the grounds of "vindictive prosecution" and by Trump and his co-defendants concerning "technical flaws" within the indictment. Stanley Woodward alleged that prosecutor Jay Bratt had once referenced the fact that Woodward had been recommended for a judgeship, as if to threaten him if he did not succeed in convincing Nauta to cooperate. Prosecutor David Harbach pointed out that Woodward did not report the alleged incident until months after the August 2022 meeting at which it supposedly happened. Prior to the hearing, the release of previously sealed court files revealed that a federal judge had previously found that there was "sufficient evidence" that Trump obstructed justice, enabling investigators to obtain information that would normally be protected under attorney-client privilege. The judge, in doing so, had cited the fact that Trump attorneys had found further documents in Trump's bedroom.

On May 24, Jack Smith's office asked Cannon to place a gag order on Trump related to his "repeated mischaracterization" of the actions of law enforcement officials. Three days earlier, Trump had begun falsely claiming that Joe Biden had been ready to kill him during the FBI search, an unprecedented accusation. In making this accusation, Trump was referencing a standard law enforcement policy, a copy of which had been attached to the FBI's description of the planned search of Mar-a-Lago, which states that officers are authorized to use lethal force if there is "imminent danger of death or serious physical injury". The FBI had taken steps to ensure that Trump would not be present during the search and had given advance notice to the Secret Service. On May 27, Trump's lawyers said that the gag order request was an "extraordinary, unprecedented, and unconstitutional censorship application" and was "bad-faith behavior" on the part of government prosecutors. On May 28, Cannon denied the request, saying that prosecutors had not given sufficient advance notice to the defense.

On June 5, Cannon postponed a multi-day proceeding for Trump's team to question federal officials under oath, and she did not set a new date for it.

On June 10, Cannon denied a motion to dismiss by Trump who claimed the indictment was improper; however, Cannon struck a paragraph from Smith's superseding indictment, finding it "inappropriate".

Three days of hearings were held in late June. (Cannon had set these on June 5.) They were to include the prosecution request for a gag order, the defense request to have Jack Smith's appointment as special counsel declared invalid, and the defense request to throw out evidence seized by the FBI or provided by Evan Corcoran. The hearing on Jack Smith's appointment was to include arguments by friends of the court: Josh Blackman and Gene Schaerr in Trump's favor, and Matthew Seligman in Smith's favor. Following hearings on June 21 and 24, the prosecution submitted a 30-page court filing in which they reaffirmed that they had maintained the "integrity of each container in which the evidence was found, that is, box-to-box integrity." Given "the haphazard manner" in which Trump had combined "some of the nation's most highly guarded secrets" with "newspapers, thank you notes, Christmas ornaments, magazines, clothing, and photographs of himself and others", investigators having further shuffled the material within each seized box should not be "critical to his defense", they argued. They also pointed out that the defense's new argument that the order of the documents inside each box could prove Trump's unawareness of their presence contradicts the defense's previous claim that Trump had declassified the documents and designated them as his personal property. The third day of hearings was June 25. Following that, Cannon did not rule from the bench.

On June 27, regarding Trump's motion to suppress the use of certain evidence, Cannon said an evidentiary hearing was justified. At such a hearing, she would hear witness testimony and review evidence to decide whether it could be used at trial. She did not set a date for the evidentiary hearing. She requested more information about the FBI warrant for the 2022 search of Mar-a-Lago and about Corcoran's grand jury testimony.

On July 5, Trump's team requested a new schedule to reflect the recent outcome of Trump v. United States in which the Supreme Court gave former presidents presumptive immunity for official acts. The next day, to allow briefs to be submitted on the issue, Cannon paused filing deadlines for two weeks.

==== Trump's request to indefinitely delay trial ====
Cannon set an administrative placeholder date for a trial. The prosecution requested that the trial start on December 11, 2023—a relatively short delay—to give the defense more time to review discovery material, obtain security clearance, and properly handle classified evidence. The case could be delayed several months beyond what the government asked for. Prosecutors told the court that the trial should still proceed expeditiously given its significance and because the case "involves straightforward theories of liability" and presented neither "novel questions of fact" nor "unusual or complex" legal issues.

In a July 11, 2023, court filing, Trump and Nauta asked the court to indefinitely delay their trial. Their attorneys argued that it would be "challenging" to prepare for trial while Trump spent his "time and energy" on the presidential campaign trail and that it would be hard to find a "fair and impartial" jury. In its reply two days later, prosecutors argued that there was "no basis in law or fact" for such an "indeterminate and open-ended" delay, and they asked for trial to begin December 11. On July 21, Cannon set the trial to begin on May 20, 2024. In October, the Trump team asked to delay the trial until after the 2024 election. On November 10, Cannon said it was too early to decide whether to delay the trial. She delayed deadlines for filing and responding to motions, and she said she would reconsider the trial date at a March 1, 2024 scheduling conference. On November 16, Cannon said she would likewise wait until the March 1 hearing to give Trump a deadline for saying which classified evidence he will use at trial. That deadline would likely be about one month from the time it is set; if so, it would be an April deadline. Because of the sequential nature of pretrial deadlines under the Classified Information Procedures Act, Cannon's decision had, according to The Guardian, effectively delayed the trial by four months. Legal experts, including national security attorney Bradley Moss and former federal prosecutor Brandon Van Grack, said the original trial date of May 2024 was now implausible, while former U.S. Attorney Joyce Vance said Cannon was "on track to delay past the election."

At the March 1 hearing, Cannon did not make any decisions. Prosecutors proposed holding the trial on July 8. The defense continued to request that the trial be held after the election, but proposed August 12 as an alternative, a date that might overlap (and therefore interfere) with the trial on federal charges of election obstruction.

On March 18, Cannon gave each side two weeks to propose jury instructions. Each side must provide two sets: an instruction for the jury to decide whether each of the various records Trump kept should be considered "personal" or "presidential" under the Presidential Records Act, and another instruction that assumes Trump was permitted to take anything he wanted anyway. On April 2, the special prosecutor said that these different interpretations of the Presidential Records Act are irrelevant to assessing whether Trump violated the Espionage Act.

In an April 14 court filing, Smith asked that the defendants "not be allowed to use their overlapping engagements to perpetually delay trial".

== Dismissal ==
On July 15, 2024, Cannon dismissed the case against Trump, ruling that "Special Counsel Smith’s appointment violates the Appointments Clause of the United States Constitution." The rationale mirrored Supreme Court Justice Clarence Thomas' concurrence in Trump v. United States, released two weeks prior.

In doing so, Cannon ruled a key portion of the 1974 Supreme Court case United States v. Nixon to be non-binding because the specific issue of that special prosecutor's validity had not been sufficiently contested or considered by that court.

== Appeal of dismissal ==
On July 17, with permission from the Justice Department, Special Counsel Smith filed a notice of appeal, and on August 26 he asked the 11th Circuit Court of Appeals to reinstate the case. The appeals court also has the power to reassign the case to another judge, though Smith did not request it.

The filing noted the distinction in the Appointments Clause of "inferior officers" who can be appointed directly by the head of an agency without presidential appointment and Senate confirmation, as would be necessary for principal officers. Prosecutors, disputing Cannon's ruling that found no specific statute permitted Garland's appointment of Smith, asserted that at least four statutes empower an attorney general to appoint a special counsel, and such authority had been acknowledged by courts dating to the prosecution of Jefferson Davis after the Civil War. The filing added:

The Attorney General validly appointed the Special Counsel, In ruling otherwise, the district court deviated from binding Supreme Court precedent, misconstrued the statutes that authorized the Special Counsel's appointment, and took inadequate account of the longstanding history of Attorney General appointments of special counsels.

On September 3, Citizens for Responsibility and Ethics in Washington (CREW) filed a brief arguing against the dismissal. “If the court reverses Judge Aileen M. Cannon’s ruling in this matter," CREW wrote, "it will be the third time in under three years" that it reverses one of her rulings in the documents case. CREW also argued that Cannon should be removed from the case.

Trump was elected to the presidency in November 2024. Two weeks before the election, ABC News reported that the Trump campaign was considering naming Cannon as U.S. Attorney General. After Cannon dismissed the documents case, Trump advisers including Boris Epshteyn placed her name second on a list of nearly a dozen candidates for Attorney General in a document called "Transition Planning: Legal Principals". Trump's lead attorney Todd Blanche was listed as a candidate for Deputy Attorney General and White House Counsel, and (according to other sources) for FBI Director. Nauta's attorney Stanley Woodward was also being considered for White House Counsel and other top positions. On October 23, CREW renewed its call to remove Cannon from the case, saying that she, as a "potential attorney general...can never be impartial in the classified documents case".

As a result of Trump's election in November 2024, prosecutor Jack Smith announced on November 25 that he would be seeking to dismiss the appeal (without prejudice) as it regards Trump, while retaining the appeal regarding Nauta and de Oliveira. The court granted that motion to dismiss regarding Trump on November 26, 2024. Politico described that request for dismissal as "in some sense a formality" because Trump's Attorney General would have dropped the matter later on. Indeed, on January 29, 2025, under the new Trump administration, the Justice Department dropped its appeal regarding Nauta and de Oliveira.

== Special counsel's final report ==
Days before his resignation in January 2025, special counsel Jack Smith completed a final report on his investigations into Trump. The first volume on the election obstruction case was publicly released, but the second volume on the classified documents case will not be made available outside of the Department of Justice, not even to the House and Senate Judiciary committees.

On January 20, 2025, Cannon blocked the release of the classified documents report. The next day, she extended a temporary hold she had previously set, and in December, she further extended it, allowing Trump extra time to challenge its expiration. On February 23, 2026, she made the block permanent, ruling that no information in the report could be shared outside the Department of Justice.

== Response ==
=== To indictment ===
==== Trump ====
After the indictment, Trump and his allies within the Republican Party escalated verbal attacks on the FBI, Justice Department, and federal prosecutors, whom Trump denounced in a speech to the Georgia Republican Party as "cowards", "fascists and thugs", and "sinister forces" days following his indictment. Trump has repeatedly referred to the case as the "boxes hoax".

Trump falsely asserted during the days after his indictment that under the PRA he "had every right to have these documents." Legal experts said there was no basis for his claim that the PRA superseded the Espionage Act under which he was charged. He said, "The Espionage Act has been used to go after traitors and spies. It has nothing to do with a former president legally keeping his own documents," though, despite its name, that act is not limited to espionage allegations. Trump also cited the so-called "Clinton socks case," a 2010 lawsuit brought by Judicial Watch arguing that audio recordings of interviews President Bill Clinton had given during his presidency must be turned over to NARA, though the NARA had never sought them as presidential records. A federal judge dismissed the Clinton lawsuit because Judicial Watch had no standing to bring it. Trump incorrectly insisted Clinton had won and that the court had recognized Clinton's right to the recordings.

On June 19, 2023, Trump was interviewed by Bret Baier of Fox News. When Baier asked why he hadn't simply handed over his boxes, Trump replied "Before I send boxes over, I have to take all of my things out. These boxes were interspersed with all sorts of things" and that he worried they might contain "golf shirts, clothing, pants, shoes". He claimed he felt at the time: "I don’t want to hand that over to NARA yet." He said he had not dealt with the request because he had been "very busy". He also maintained he had already "declassified" all documents in his possession.

On July 15, 2023, Trump gave a speech to the Turning Point Action Conference, claiming: "Whatever documents a president decides to take with him, he has the absolute and unquestioned right to do so." He falsely added: "This was a law that was passed and signed."

On September 6, 2023, again citing the Presidential Records Act, Trump told radio host Hugh Hewitt: "I'm allowed to do whatever I want."

On September 14, 2023, Trump was interviewed by Megyn Kelly for SiriusXM. He said: "I'm allowed to take these documents, classified or not classified. And frankly, when I have them, they become unclassified. People think you have to go through a ritual. You don’t — at least in my opinion, you don't."

On October 24, 2024, Trump said in a radio interview that if he is elected, "I would fire him [Jack Smith] within two seconds."

==== Other Republicans ====
Many congressional Republicans responded to the indictment by asserting, without evidence, that Trump was being targeted for political purposes by a Justice Department "weaponized" by President Joe Biden, although an independent special counsel oversaw the investigation and a grand jury made the charging decision. Trump allies who rallied around the ex-president after the indictment included the House Republican leadership (Speaker Kevin McCarthy, Majority Leader Steve Scalise, Republican Conference Chair Elise Stefanik), as well as Senator JD Vance.

Trump allies engaged in violent rhetoric after the indictment, depicting the indictment as an "act of war" and calling for retribution. Among others, Republican congressman Andy Biggs, Trump-endorsed House candidate Joe Kent, and former Republican Arizona gubernatorial candidate Kari Lake made allusions to the use of violence in their attacks on the federal indictment.

Most members of the Senate Republican leadership team, including minority leader Mitch McConnell and minority whip John Thune, stayed silent on the indictment. Senator Mitt Romney of Utah said in a statement that Trump "brought these charges upon himself ... by refusing to simply return them when given numerous opportunities to do so." Former U.S. Representative Adam Kinzinger, a Republican critic of Trump, wrote, "Today, Justice is being served. Nobody is above the law. The former President will get a fair trial. The former President will be held accountable." Former Attorney General under Trump William Barr said it was ridiculous to present Trump as the victim of a witch hunt: "It's a very detailed indictment. And it's very, very damning ... He's not a victim here."

By August, House Republicans were seeking to use their power of the purse to halt investigations and prosecutions of Trump. Some proposed leveraging the looming September 30 deadline to fund the government for the coming year in order to trigger a federal shutdown, though none of the federal or state actions against Trump would be affected by a shutdown.

On March 19, 2024, at Mar-a-Lago, Roger Stone told journalist Ally Sammarco: "I think the judge is on the verge of dismissing the charges against him in Florida" (according to Rolling Stone).

==== Democrats ====
The top Democratic leadership in Congress — Senate majority leader Chuck Schumer and House minority leader Hakeem Jeffries — released a statement urging both critics and supporters of Trump to let the case "proceed peacefully". President Biden declined to comment on the indictment.

=== To dismissal ===
On July 30, 2024, Attorney General Merrick Garland spoke to Ken Dilanian on NBC Nightly News, Garland said he disagreed with Cannon's ruling that his appointment of the special counsel had been unconstitutional. He said: "For more than 20 years, I was a federal judge. Do I look like somebody who would make that basic mistake about the law? I don’t think so."

The precedent set by Judge Cannon was raised a year later in another matter involving Trump: the federal government's prosecutions of James Comey and Letitia James under the second Trump presidency. On November 13, 2025, Judge Cameron McGowan Currie held a hearing applying to those two cases, regarding the validity of the appointment of the prosecutor, Lindsey Halligan. Comey and James were arguing that the prosecutor's appointment was invalid, while the Justice Department maintained that it was valid. Judge Currie asked Justice Department lawyer Henry Whitaker if he believed that Cannon had incorrectly decided to dismiss the government documents case against Trump. Whitaker said the details of that case were not analogous.

== See also ==
- Hillary Clinton email controversy § Classified information in emails
- Indictments against Donald Trump – 2023 charges against the then former U.S. president
- Joe Biden classified documents incident – 2022–present political incident
- Legal affairs of Andrew Jackson
- Lincoln–Johnson ledger-removal allegation – Alleged 1869 Andrew Johnson crime
- Mike Pence classified documents incident – 2023–present political incident
