= Jay I. Bratt =

American lawyer and former federal prosecutor

Jay I. Bratt is an American lawyer who served as a federal prosecutor at the United States Department of Justice for 34 years until his retirement in January 2025. As Chief of the Counterintelligence and Export Control Section (CES) in the National Security Division, Bratt oversaw all federal investigations and prosecutions under the Espionage Act, export control laws, and foreign influence statutes.

His notable prosecutions included the Blackwater guards case, Espionage Act cases involving Jonathan Pollard and Navy linguist James Hitselberger, and investigations into Chinese telecommunications firms Huawei and ZTE. From 2022 to 2025, he served as Counselor to Special Counsel Jack Smith on the classified documents case.

== Early life and education ==
Bratt earned a Bachelor of Arts degree from Brandeis University in 1981 and a Juris Doctor from Harvard Law School in 1984.

== Career ==
=== Department of Justice ===
Before joining the Department of Justice, Bratt worked as a staff attorney at the Federal Trade Commission and as an associate at a Chicago law firm. He began his DOJ career as a line prosecutor in the U.S. Attorney's Office for the District of Columbia, where he spent approximately 20 years handling criminal prosecutions. He later served as Deputy Chief of the National Security Section in the D.C. U.S. Attorney's Office.

Bratt held several positions within the National Security Division, including Deputy Chief for Export Control and Sanctions and Principal Deputy Chief of the Counterintelligence and Export Control Section. He was appointed Chief of CES around 2017, a position in which he oversaw all federal investigations and prosecutions involving the Espionage Act, export control and sanctions laws, and foreign influence statutes.

During his career, Bratt oversaw the prosecution of Blackwater guards convicted of killing 14 Iraqi civilians and wounding 17 others. He prosecuted James Hitselberger, a Navy linguist charged under the Espionage Act with unauthorized retention of national defense information. In 2014, he represented the government at the parole hearing for Jonathan Pollard, a former Navy analyst convicted of spying for Israel. Bratt was also involved in the prosecution of Bryan Underwood, a former security guard at the U.S. consulate in Guangzhou, China, who pleaded guilty in 2013 to attempting to sell information to Chinese officials. He worked on the case against Stephen J. Kim, a former State Department contractor who pleaded guilty in 2014 to leaking classified information about North Korea to a Fox News reporter. He helped oversee investigations of Chinese telecommunications firms Huawei and ZTE for sanctions violations.

=== Special Counsel's Office ===
In November 2022, Attorney General Merrick Garland appointed Jack Smith as Special Counsel to oversee the investigation into classified documents found at Mar-a-Lago. Bratt, who had led the investigation before Smith's appointment, joined the Special Counsel's Office as Counselor and served as the lead attorney on the case in the Southern District of Florida.

In August 2022, Bratt appeared at a federal court hearing regarding the FBI search of Mar-a-Lago, arguing against unsealing the probable cause affidavit by stating the investigation was in its "early stages" and that releasing the document could provide a "road map" to the investigation and jeopardize witness identities.

Attorney Stanley Woodward, who represented Trump aide Walt Nauta, alleged in 2023 that Bratt raised Woodward's application for a D.C. judgeship during a meeting in a manner that implied pressure to cooperate. Bratt denied any improper intent, and prosecutors stated he mentioned the application "purely as a matter of professional courtesy." The matter was referred to the Justice Department's Office of Professional Responsibility.

Bratt retired from the Department of Justice on January 3, 2025, after 34 years of service.

=== Post-retirement ===
Following his retirement, Bratt joined the University of Virginia School of Law as an adjunct professor.

In May 2025, Bratt appeared before the House Judiciary Committee for a deposition as part of the committee's investigation into the Special Counsel's Office. He invoked his Fifth Amendment right against self-incrimination and declined to answer questions.
