= United States v. Southern Poverty Law Center Inc. =

2026 court case

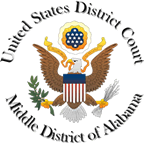
- Court: United States District Court for the Middle District of Alabama
- Full case name: United States of America v. Southern Poverty Law Center Inc.

United States of America v. Southern Poverty Law Center Inc. is a criminal case being brought against the Southern Poverty Law Center (SPLC) at the United States District Court for the Middle District of Alabama. The US government charged the SPLC with wire fraud, making false statements to a federally insured bank, and conspiracy to commit concealment money laundering.

Legal experts described the charges in the case as legally weak and unlikely to result in sanctions against the SPLC.

== Background ==
The Southern Poverty Law Center (SPLC) is an American 501(c)(3) nonprofit legal advocacy organization specializing in civil rights and public interest litigation. Based in Montgomery, Alabama, it is known for its legal cases against white supremacist groups, for its classification of hate groups and other extremist organizations, and for promoting anti-bias education. The SPLC was founded by Morris Dees, Joseph J. Levin Jr., and Julian Bond in 1971 as a civil rights legal clinic in Montgomery.

The SPLC has faced criticism from the political right over its hate group classifications. That criticism increased following the assassination of Charlie Kirk, whose Turning Point USA organization was described by the SPLC as "A Case Study of the Hard Right in 2024". A month after Kirk's death, the Federal Bureau of Investigation (FBI) under Kash Patel severed relations with the SPLC.

The charges in the 2026 case center on a discontinued program by the SPLC which maintained paid informants within extremist organizations. The SPLC said the program, which began in the 1980s, was known to the government, and that information from the program was shared with law enforcement agencies. In court filings for the case, the SPLC said that, in 2019, one tip from an informant helped prevent an attack in Las Vegas, with the FBI arresting an associate of the Atomwaffen Division.

Sources speaking to CBS News said an Internal Revenue Service investigation from 2019–2020 had focused on shell bank accounts used in the informant program "to determine whether the SPLC unlawfully failed to file tax returns". According to CBS:

... a Treasury Department rule exempts 501(c)(3) nonprofits from filing tax returns in connection with payments to informants who provide information about potential criminal activity. As a result, IRS lawyers later cautioned against seeking an indictment on tax charges, several of the sources said.

== Charges ==
On April 21, 2026, under the second Trump administration, the Department of Justice (DOJ) announced a grand jury had indicted the SPLC on 11 counts of wire fraud, false statements made to a federally insured bank, and conspiracy to commit money laundering for its use of paid informants. Prosecutors with the DOJ alleged that the SPLC defrauded donors in maintaining a program which secretly paid more than $3 million to informants affiliated with the KKK, the Unite the Right rally, Aryan Nations, the National Alliance, and other extremist groups from 2014 to 2023.

The SPLC denied any wrongdoing and said it would contest the charges. On May 26 it filed a motion to dismiss the case, arguing it was an example of retribution by the Trump administration. According to SPLC lawyers, the DOJ decided to file charges before interviewing any current SPLC employees or requesting documents from the SPLC, which the lawyers called "procedural irregularities".

On June 2, the DOJ said it obtained a superseding indictment of the SPLC. The new indictment did not include any new charges, but revised some legal irregularities from the first indictment. The DOJ filed a second superseding indictment in June, secured in August, which included new charges against a former SPLC employee.

== Responses ==
Acting Attorney General Todd Blanche said the SPLC's informant program amounted to "manufacturing extremism". DOJ officials said this premise was under investigation. The SPLC said the informant program was no longer active, that it had monitored threats of violence with information often shared with law enforcement, and that it saved lives. The New York Times reported multiple liberal commentators had noted the use of paid informants as being common practice in the 1960s and 1970s, notably used by the FBI to infiltrate civil rights and activist groups.

In a Fox News interview on April 21—the day of the indictment—Blanche said the government had "no information ... that suggests" the SPLC had shared information from the program with the government. In an April 26 interview on Fox News, Blanche said "It is true that over the years they have selectively shared information with law enforcement." The SPLC moved to request a retraction from the DOJ of Blanche's April 21 statement; the DOJ said the April 26 interview was sufficient, and on June 1 Magistrate Judge Kelly F. Pate rejected the SPLC's motion on these grounds.

In response to the indictment, the large donor-advised funds Fidelity Charitable, Vanguard Charitable, and Charles Schwab-affiliate DAFgiving360 announced that they would no longer honor donor grant recommendations to the SPLC. The three groups were vehicles for more than $7 million in donations to the SPLC in the most recently reported year.

In the month after the indictment, state attorneys general Steve Marshall of Alabama and Ken Paxton of Texas announced state investigations into whether the SPLC violated state law.

=== Analysis ===
CNN's Hannah Rabinowitz and Devan Cole, the latter of whom is a legal expert, reported that the indictment did not include many details as to how donated funds had been used to pursue violent interests, or if any complaints had been lodged by donors, which the reporters said was "a glaring omission" that could make securing a conviction difficult. According to The Economist:

For the fraud and money-laundering charges to stick, prosecutors will have to show either that the non-profit made explicitly false statements to donors or that it had a clear legal duty to disclose information, as a doctor would to a patient or a lawyer to a client. Samuel Buell of Duke University reckons they will probably not have much of a shot at either.

Law professor Stephen Bright, who the Wall Street Journal described as a "longtime critic of the group’s fundraising", said the indictment looked weak and politically motivated.

The New York Times described the charges as appearing retaliatory and fitting into the Trump administration's use of the DOJ to target its political opponents. According to The Economist, the indictment exposed the identities of several informants, which "risks getting them killed."
