= Stanley Woodward Jr. =

American attorney (born 1982/1983)

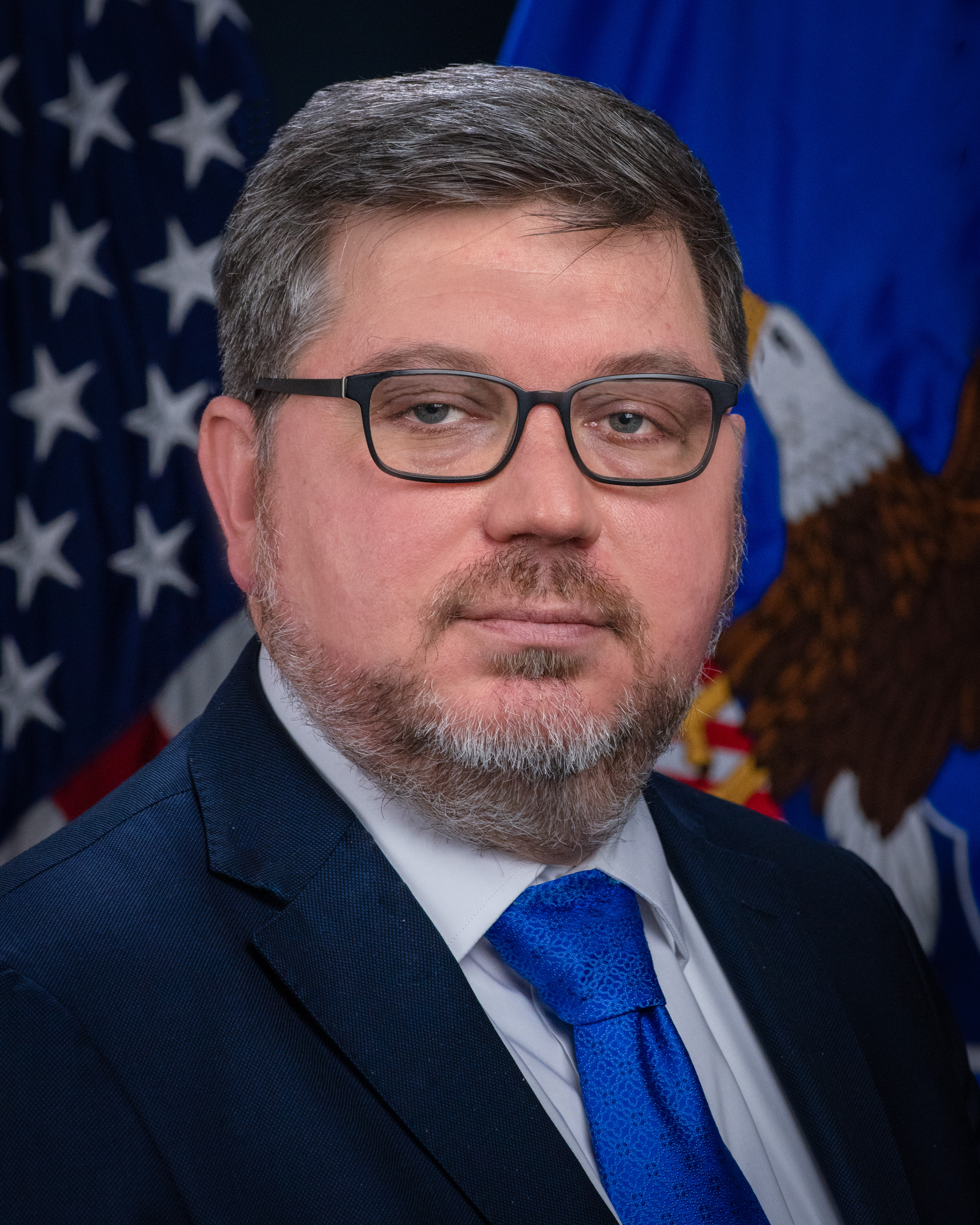
- Official portrait, 2025

20th United States Associate Attorney General
- Incumbent
- Assumed office November 14, 2025
- President: Donald Trump
- Preceded by: Vanita Gupta

Senior Counselor to the President
- In office January 20, 2025 – November 14, 2025 Serving with Alina Habba
- President: Donald Trump
- Preceded by: Position established

Personal details
- Born: Stanley Edmund Woodward Jr. 1982 or 1983 (age 43–44)
- Spouse: Kristin McGough (m. 2012)
- Children: 4
- Education: Catholic University of America (JD)
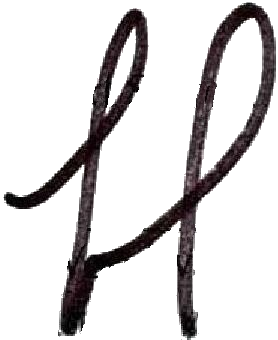
- Signature

Stanley Edmund Woodward Jr. (born 1982 or 1983) is an American attorney who has served as the United States associate attorney general since November 2025. Woodward served as the senior counselor to the president from January to November 2025.

Woodward graduated from the Columbus School of Law in 2008. He clerked for three judges and joined Akin Gump Strauss Hauer & Feld. In 2020, Woodward established a law firm, Brand Woodward, alongside Stan Brand. Woodward represented several alleged participants in the January 6 Capitol attack and allies of former President Donald Trump, including Trump's valet, Walt Nauta, in the classified documents case.

In January 2025, Trump named Woodward as the senior counselor to the president. He additionally advised Attorney General Pam Bondi. In April, Trump nominated Woodward to serve as the United States associate attorney general. The Senate voted to confirm Woodward in October.

== Early life and education ==
Stanley Edmund Woodward Jr. was born in 1982 or 1983. Woodward graduated from Catholic University of America's Columbus School of Law in 2008. At Catholic University, Woodward met Kristin McGough, whom he married in 2012; they have four children.

== Career ==
=== Clerkships and private practice (2008–2020) ===
After graduating from Catholic University, Woodward clerked for three judges. In the aftermath of the 2008 financial crisis, he joined Akin Gump Strauss Hauer & Feld. Woodward worked on civil litigation, including matters relating to the Foreign Corrupt Practices Act.

=== Brand Woodward (2020–2025) ===
In 2020, Stan Brand convinced Woodward to establish a law firm, Brand Woodward. The firm received approximately US$120,000 from former President Donald Trump's political action committee, Save America, from October 2021 to September 2022. By March 2021, Woodward had begun to represent individuals indicted for allegedly participating in the January 6 Capitol attack. His initial clients included Federico Klein, a political appointee at the Department of State accused of assaulting police officers. By October, Woodward had represented Joe Biggs, a leader of the far-right militant organization the Proud Boys. He later served as a lawyer to Dan Scavino, a former White House deputy chief of staff in the Trump administration; Kelly Meggs, who led the Florida chapter of the far-right militia the Oath Keepers; the actor Jay Johnston; and Ryan Samsel, a January 6 rioter.

By November 2022, Woodward had begun to represent Peter Navarro, a former Trump trade advisor, as he conflicted with the House Select Committee to Investigate the January 6th Attack on the United States Capitol. Brand and Woodward filed a brief on behalf of House Minority Leader Kevin McCarthy amid contempt of Congress proceedings into the political strategist Steve Bannon. Woodward additionally represented Ronny Jackson, a retired rear admiral who had been demoted amid allegations of impropriety. By January 2025, Woodward had continued to represent two people accused of participating in the January 6 Capitol attack. He dissolved Brand Woodward after being appointed as senior counselor to the president. After Trump nominated Woodward to serve as the associate attorney general in April 2025, Woodward recused himself in a dispute over Navarro's emails.

As the Smith special counsel investigation began examining Trump's handling of government documents, Woodward legally assisted Walt Nauta, Trump's valet; Yuscil Taveras, an information technology worker at Mar-a-Lago; Kash Patel, an aide to Trump; and Taylor Budowich, a former spokesman for Trump. Prior to the indictment of Trump and Nauta, Woodward met with prosecutors involved in the inquiry. According to The New York Times, Jay I. Bratt, an official in the Department of Justice's national security division, sought Nauta's cooperation and allegedly mentioned that Woodward had a pending application to serve as a judge for the Superior Court of the District of Columbia. Woodward concurrently represented Will Russell, who received a subpoena from the special counsel Jack Smith's team in its inquiry into whether Trump attempted to overturn the 2020 presidential election. Russell's appearance before a federal grand jury caused Woodward to be late to a reading of a bench trial verdict for Klein, delaying the verdict. In the classified documents case, Bratt submitted a motion to the judge presiding over the case, Aileen Cannon, requesting a hearing into whether Woodward could simultaneously represent Nauta and three witnesses who could be called to trial, including Taveras. Taveras later changed lawyers and recanted his testimony.

== Senior Counselor to the President (January–November 2025) ==
According to The New York Times, Woodward was considered as a possible candidate to serve as the White House counsel after Donald Trump's victory in the 2024 presidential election. He donated to Trump's second presidential transition. On January 4, 2025, Trump named Woodward as his senior counselor to the president.

Woodward became an advisor to Attorney General Pam Bondi by April 2025. According to Roger Alford, the deputy assistant attorney general for the Department of Justice Antitrust Division, Woodward was involved in Hewlett Packard Enterprise's settlement with the department after it attempted to acquire Juniper Networks. According to The Wall Street Journal, Woodward pressured the assistant attorney general for the antitrust division, Gail Slater, to sign the settlement, threatening to fire her deputies. After the Department of Justice announced the settlement, two of Slater's deputies were fired; Slater resigned in February 2026, a decision that occurred amid her dispute with Woodward.

== Associate Attorney General (2025–present) ==
On April 2, 2025, Trump named Woodward as his nominee to serve as the associate attorney general. The far-right political activist Laura Loomer attempted to get Trump to withdraw Woodward's nomination by noting that Woodward's wife, Kristin, had supported the legal affairs of the Black Lives Matter movement; the effort was unsuccessful. Woodward appeared before the Senate Committee on the Judiciary on May 21, 2025. He told the committee that Trump would follow Supreme Court decisions, but was ambivalent over whether Trump would abide by lower federal court orders. The Senate Committee on the Judiciary voted to advance Woodward's nomination in a 12–10 vote along party lines on June 12. The Senate voted to confirm Woodward in a bloc of nominees on October 7.

At the Department of Justice, Woodward was involved in antitrust lawsuits. According to Bloomberg News, he was "viewed as business-friendly" and a proponent of settlements. In December, after offering an initially successful offer to acquire Warner Bros. Discovery, Netflix's lead antitrust lawyer met with Woodward—as opposed to Gail Slater—to argue for the deal. In June, ahead of Omeed Assefi's expected resignation as the acting assistant attorney general for the Antitrust Division, Woodward began to run the division. That month, The Wall Street Journal reported that Woodward had told the Department of Justice's Chicago office that he opposed antitrust trials.

In April 2026, CBS News reported that Trump was likely set to demote Woodward and promote Harmeet Dhillon, the assistant attorney general for the Civil Rights Division. Woodward remained in the position. He signed the agreement to settle Trump's lawsuit against the Internal Revenue Service in May. After criticism of the settlement's Anti-Weaponization Fund forced the Department of Justice to end the effort, Woodward replied in the affirmative to a post from South Carolina senator Lindsey Graham suggesting that Trump officials could use existing laws to compensate individuals who claim they were victims of political persecution. In June, Woodward issued a memorandum asserting that xAI could operate power plants without Clean Air Act permits, claiming that xAI was supporting the Department of Defense's military operations. In September 2026, Woodward filed a brief in support of OpenAI in a case alleging that it violated the copyright of numerous media organizations.

On October 23, 2026, Woodward filed a lawsuit in District Court in Alaska, seeking to prevent certification of a Democratic victory in the U.S. Senate race if the Democrat nominee, Mary Peltola, were to win election over incumbent Republican Senator Dan Sullivan by a margin less than the vote total of a different Dan Sullivan, a non-politician who was placed on the ballot by the Peltola campaign and the Democratic Senatorial Campaign Committee for the purpose of confusing voters.
