= Raymond Dearie =

American judge (born 1944)

Special Master in 22-81294-CIV-CANNON
- In office September 15, 2022 – December 12, 2022

Judge of the United States Foreign Intelligence Surveillance Court
- In office July 2, 2012 – July 1, 2019
- Appointed by: John Roberts
- Preceded by: Malcolm Jones Howard
- Succeeded by: Louis Guirola Jr.

Senior Judge of the United States District Court for the Eastern District of New York
- Incumbent
- Assumed office April 3, 2011

Chief Judge of the United States District Court for the Eastern District of New York
- In office 2007–2011
- Preceded by: Edward R. Korman
- Succeeded by: Carol Amon

Judge of the United States District Court for the Eastern District of New York
- In office March 19, 1986 – April 3, 2011
- Appointed by: Ronald Reagan
- Preceded by: Seat established
- Succeeded by: Pamela K. Chen

Personal details
- Born: Raymond Joseph Dearie; 1944 (age 81–82) Rockville Centre, New York, U.S.
- Relatives: John C. Dearie (cousin)
- Education: Fairfield University (BA); St. John's University (JD)

Raymond Joseph Dearie (born 1944) is an American lawyer who is a senior United States district judge of the United States District Court for the Eastern District of New York. He also served as a judge of the United States Foreign Intelligence Surveillance Court from 2012 to 2019.

== Early life and education ==
Dearie was born in Rockville Centre, New York, the son of John A. Dearie and Catherine Dearie. John C. Dearie, a former member of the New York State Assembly, is his first cousin. Dearie graduated from Fairfield University, receiving his Bachelor of Arts in 1966. He received his Juris Doctor from St. John's University School of Law in 1969, where he was Editor-in-Chief of the St. John's Law Review. Dearie received an Alumni Professional Achievement Award from Fairfield University in 1986. He received the honorary degree of Doctor of Laws, from the St. John's University School of Law, and later delivered the school's commencement speech to the graduating class in 2008.

== Career ==
Dearie began his legal career at Shearman & Sterling in 1969. Dearie subsequently worked as an Assistant United States Attorney in the Eastern District of New York, where he served in the Appeals Division from 1971 to 1974, as the Chief of the General Crimes Section from 1974 to 1976, Head Chief of the Office's Criminal Division from 1976-1977, and briefly as the Executive Assistant United States Attorney for the District in 1977. He worked in private practice until 1980 before serving as the Chief Assistant United States Attorney until 1982, when he was appointed the United States Attorney for the Eastern District of New York by President Ronald Reagan, serving from 1982 to 1986, before being appointed to the federal bench, by the recommendation of New York Senator Al D'Amato.

=== Federal judicial service ===
Dearie was nominated by President Ronald Reagan on February 3, 1986, to the United States District Court for the Eastern District of New York, to a new seat created by 98 Stat. 333. He was confirmed by the United States Senate on March 14, 1986, and received his commission on March 19, 1986. He served as Chief Judge from 2007 until 2011. He took senior status on April 3, 2011, and was succeeded by Judge Pamela K. Chen in March 2013. He remained an active judge on the Eastern District Court; according to a court official, he is planning to go on inactive status at the end of 2022.

On July 2, 2012, Supreme Court Chief Justice John Roberts appointed Dearie to a seven-year term on the United States Foreign Intelligence Surveillance Court.

In September 2022, Dearie was one of two candidates proposed by former President Donald Trump as a special master to review documents seized in the FBI search of Mar-a-Lago. The United States Department of Justice announced that it would accept him. He was appointed special master by Judge Aileen Cannon on September 15, 2022. On September 23, Dearie ordered Trump's legal defense to submit a sworn declaration supporting their claims that the FBI had planted evidence at Mar-a-Lago.

== Sources ==
Legal offices
New seat	Judge of the United States District Court for the Eastern District of New York; 1986–2011	Succeeded by Pamela K. Chen
Preceded by Edward R. Korman	Chief Judge of the United States District Court for the Eastern District of New York; 2007–2011	Succeeded by Carol Amon
