= Pamela K. Chen =

American judge (born 1961)

Pamela Chen
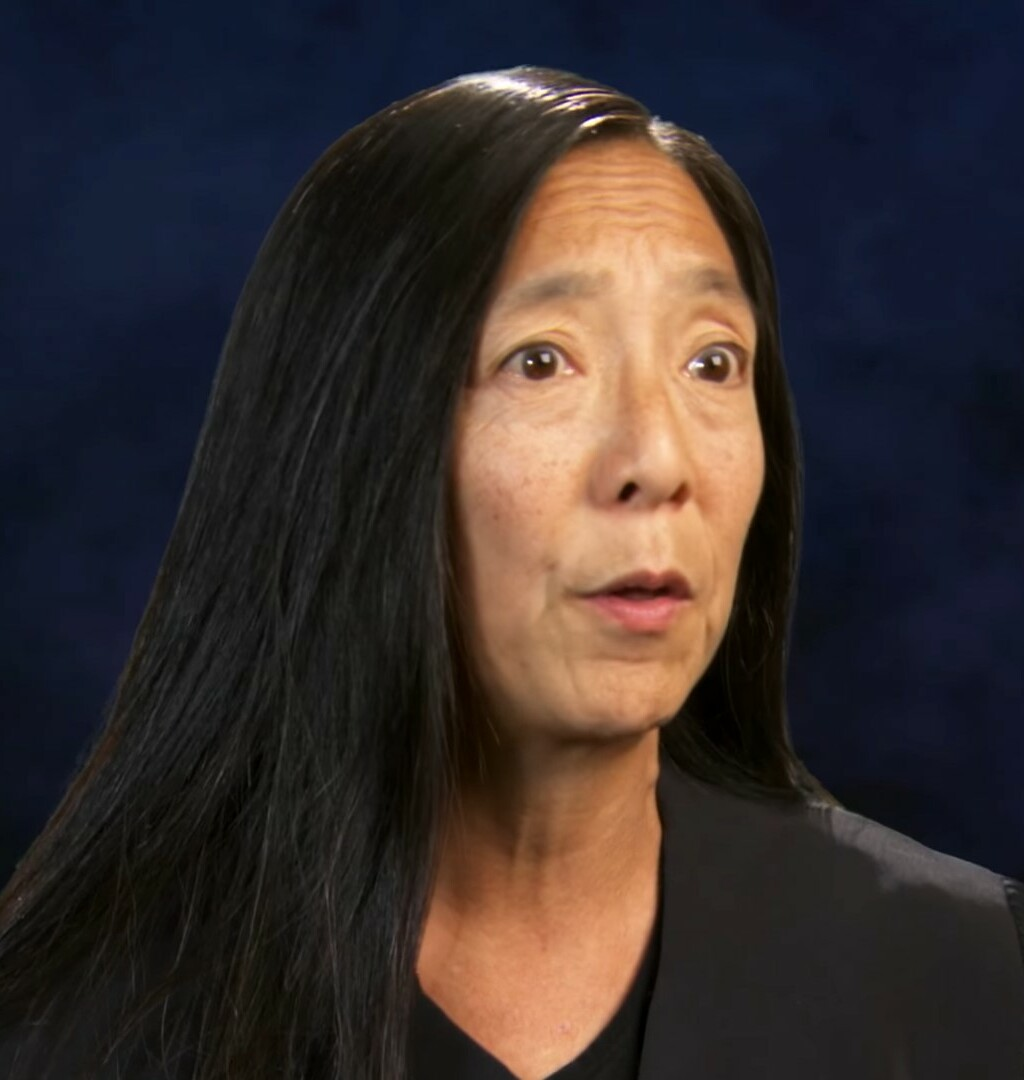
- Chen in 2018

Judge of the United States District Court for the Eastern District of New York
- Incumbent
- Assumed office March 5, 2013
- Appointed by: Barack Obama
- Preceded by: Raymond Dearie

Personal details
- Born: Pamela Ki Mai Chen; March 30, 1961 (age 65) Chicago, Illinois, U.S.
- Education: University of Michigan (BA); Georgetown University (JD)

Pamela Ki Mai Chen (born March 30, 1961) is a United States district judge of the United States District Court for the Eastern District of New York.

== Biography ==
Chen was born in 1961 in Chicago. She received her Bachelor of Arts degree in 1983 from the University of Michigan. She received her Juris Doctor in 1986 from Georgetown University Law Center.

She started her career at the law firm of Arnold & Porter from 1986 to 1989 and then moved to the criminal defense law firm of Asbill, Junkin, Myers & Buffone from 1989 to 1991, both law firms located in Washington, D.C. From 1991 to 1998, she was a trial attorney in the Special Litigation Section of the Civil Rights division at the United States Department of Justice. Beginning in 1998, she served as an assistant United States attorney in the Eastern District of New York, except for a four-month period in 2008, when she served as deputy commissioner for enforcement for the New York State Division of Human Rights. During her service in the United States Attorney's office, she held many supervisory positions, including chief of the civil rights section and deputy chief of the public integrity section.

=== Federal judicial service ===
On August 2, 2012, President Barack Obama nominated Chen to serve as a United States district judge for the United States District Court for the Eastern District of New York, to the seat vacated by Judge Raymond J. Dearie, who assumed senior status on April 3, 2011. Her nomination came at the recommendation of Senator Chuck Schumer. On September 19, 2012, the Senate Judiciary Committee held a hearing on her nomination and reported her nomination to the floor on December 6, 2012, by voice vote. On January 2, 2013, her nomination was returned to the President, due to the sine die adjournment of the Senate. On January 3, 2013, she was renominated to the same office. Her nomination was reported by the Senate Judiciary Committee on February 14, 2013, by a voice vote. On March 4, 2013, the U.S. Senate confirmed Chen's nomination by voice vote. She received her commission on March 5, 2013.

Chen is the first openly lesbian Asian-American to serve on the federal bench.

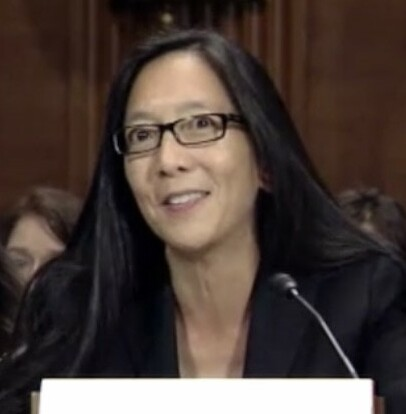
Pamela Chen during U.S. Senate Judiciary Committee hearing

== See also ==
- List of Asian American jurists
- List of first women lawyers and judges in the United States
- List of first women lawyers and judges in New York
- List of LGBT jurists in the United States

Legal offices
Preceded by Raymond Dearie	Judge of the United States District Court for the Eastern District of New York; 2013–present	Incumbent
