= Donald Q. Cochran =

American lawyer

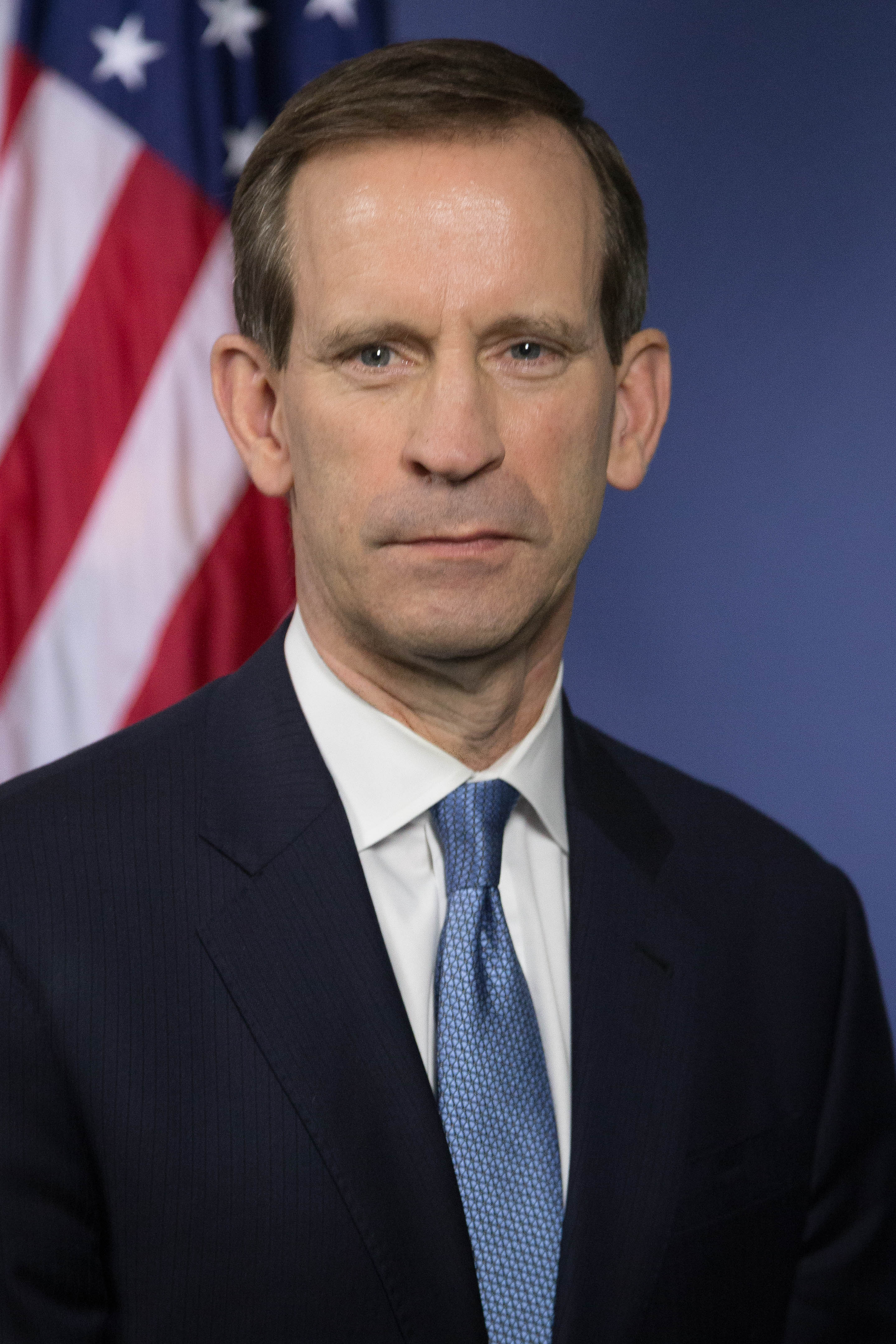

United States Attorney for the Middle District of Tennessee
- In office September 21, 2017 – February 28, 2021
- President: Donald Trump; Joe Biden
- Preceded by: Jack Smith (acting)
- Succeeded by: Mary Jane Stewart (acting)

Personal details
- Education: Vanderbilt University (BA, JD)

Donald Q. Cochran is an American attorney and academic who served as the United States Attorney for the Middle District of Tennessee from 2017 to 2021. Before assuming his current role, Cochran was a law professor at Belmont University College of Law. He was previously a professor at Cumberland School of Law and an Assistant United States Attorney in the United States District Court for the Northern District of Alabama. On February 8, 2021, he along with 55 other Trump-era attorneys were asked to resign. He submitted his resignation on February 22, effective February 28.

== Education and military service ==
Cochran received both his Bachelor of Arts from Vanderbilt University in 1980 and his Juris Doctor from Vanderbilt University Law School in 1992. Prior to attending law school, he served for nine years as an Army Ranger and Special Forces officer.

== Legal career ==
Cochran clerked for Judge Julie E. Carnes of the United States District Court for the Northern District of Georgia. He worked as a prosecutor in the Jefferson County, Alabama District Attorney's Office, where he prosecuted violent crimes including homicides and sexual assaults. From 1998 to 2002, Cochran worked as an Assistant United States Attorney in the United States District Court for the Northern District of Alabama. He prosecuted white collar crimes, public corruption, and violent crimes, including the case of Bobby Frank Cherry, the final defendant charged with the 16th Street Baptist Church bombing. He received the John C. Marshall Award for the successful prosecution of Cherry for his role in the murder of four girls in the 16th Street Baptist Church bombing.

After serving as an Assistant United States Attorney, Cochran joined the faculty of Cumberland School of Law. He taught for ten years at Cumberland, where he was the recipient of the Harvey S. Jackson Excellence in Teaching Award and the Lightfoot, Franklin, and White Award for Faculty Scholarship. Cochran then took a position as a law professor at Belmont University College of Law.
