= Kenneth Marra =

American judge (born 1951)

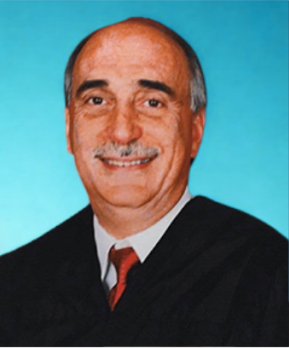

Senior Judge of the United States District Court for the Southern District of Florida
- Incumbent
- Assumed office August 1, 2017

Judge of the United States District Court for the Southern District of Florida
- In office September 13, 2002 – August 1, 2017
- Appointed by: George W. Bush
- Preceded by: Seat established by 114 Stat. 2762
- Succeeded by: Aileen Cannon

Judge of the Fifteenth Judicial Circuit of Florida
- In office February 12, 1996 – September 13, 2002

Personal details
- Born: Kenneth Anthony Marra; 1951 (age 74–75) Queens, New York
- Spouse: Deborah L. Reid
- Children: 8
- Education: Stony Brook University (BA); Stetson University (JD)

Kenneth Anthony Marra (born 1951) is a senior United States district judge of the United States District Court for the Southern District of Florida.

== Early life ==
Marra was born in 1951 in Queens, New York. He graduated from the State University of New York at Stony Brook with a Bachelor of Arts degree in 1973 and from Stetson University College of Law with a Juris Doctor in 1977.

== Career ==
=== Early career ===
Marra served as an attorney in the United States Department of Justice from 1977 to 1980. He went into private practice in Washington, D.C. from 1980 to 1983 and in Florida from 1984 to 1996.

Marra served as a judge of the Fifteenth Judicial Circuit from 1996 to 2002.

=== US District Court judge ===
President George W. Bush nominated Marra to the United States District Court for the Southern District of Florida on January 23, 2002, to a new seat created by 114 Stat. 2762. Marra was confirmed by the Senate by a vote of 82–0 on September 9, 2002. He received his commission on September 13, 2002. He assumed senior status on August 1, 2017.

==== Epstein case et sequelae ====
On April 7, 2015, Judge Marra dealt with the pedophilia case involving Jeffrey Epstein. Marra ruled that sex allegations made against Prince Andrew, the British royal, in court papers filed in Florida must be struck from the public record.

Marra judged that the Crime Victims' Rights Act was disregarded in Epstein's sweetheart plea deal. His decision was rejected by the Eleventh Circuit en banc in 2021, archived as "Doe No. 1 v. United States, 749 F. 3d 999 (11th Cir. 2014)". He was later quoted in a newsmedia interview:

I said they had to be released. That’s when basically all the dirt came out about what happened with this non-prosecution agreement.

In February 2022 the Roberts Supreme Court denied review in the case (now known as Courtney Wild because in the interim the plaintiff had let her cloak of anonymity slip) and ultimately the CVRA was of no effect in the case of Epstein's 2008 conviction because his charges and trial were not held in Federal court.

== Retirement ==
On August 26, 2025, the District Court announced Marra's retirement.

Legal offices
Preceded by Seat established by 114 Stat. 2762	Judge of the United States District Court for the Southern District of Florida; 2002–2017	Succeeded by Aileen Cannon
