= Trump v. United States (2022) =

2022 lawsuit filed by Donald Trump

Donald J. Trump v. United States of America (case no. 22-81294-CIV-CANNON), was a lawsuit filed on August 22, 2022, by former U.S. president Donald Trump in the Southern District of Florida. He sought the appointment of a special master to review materials seized on August 8, 2022, during the FBI search of Mar-a-Lago, a part of the investigation into Donald Trump's handling of government documents.

Trump requested that the special master review the seized materials, some of which were classified, for potential attorney-client or executive privilege. The case was assigned to District Judge Aileen Cannon, a Trump appointee. On September 1, Cannon ordered the United States Department of Justice (DOJ) to release the previously sealed detailed property list of the seized materials. She ordered the DOJ to halt its review of all materials on September 5 and appointed Raymond J. Dearie, senior judge of the U.S. District Court for the Eastern District of New York, as special master on September 15.

On September 16, the DOJ appealed the ruling to the 11th Circuit Court of Appeals. On September 22, the appeals court granted the DOJ's request to restore investigators' access to the classified files that had been seized during the Mar-a-Lago search and block the special master from access to them.

On December 1, the appeals court ended the special master review entirely, allowed the government to use all the documents in its investigation, and directed the lower court to dismiss Trump's lawsuit. The court ruled that Cannon lacked equitable jurisdiction to appoint a special master, that Cannon's decision did not meet the stringent standard for the judicial branch to intervene in ongoing investigations by the executive branch, and that the court would not make a special exception for former presidents. Trump did not appeal to the U.S. Supreme Court, and Cannon dismissed the case on December 12, 2022, for lack of jurisdiction.

== Background ==
Following the end of Trump's presidency, the National Archives and Records Administration (NARA) became aware that Trump had taken government documents, including classified documents, to his residence at Mar-a-Lago. In 2022, NARA notified the Federal Bureau of Investigation (FBI). Their investigation resulted in the FBI executing a search warrant at Mar-a-Lago on August 8, 2022. They searched Trump's office, residence, and a storage area, and seized 13,000 government documents, some of them with top secret/sensitive compartmented information (TS/SCI), top secret, secret, and confidential classification markings.

== Trump motion for appointment of special master ==
On August 22, 2022, Trump filed a motion in the Southern District of Florida seeking appointment of a special master to review all material seized on August 8 and to determine if any should be returned to him. The case was assigned to District Judge Aileen Cannon, a Trump appointee. In court papers, Trump did not suggest he had any "standing order" to declassify materials, a defense he had initially proposed. Trump also suggested that the Presidential Records Act is not criminally enforceable.

A few days later, Cannon said she was inclined to approve Trump's request. (Note: Preliminary Order on Motion for Judicial Oversight and Additional Relief, In re Search of Mar-a-Lago, No. 9:22-cv-81294 (S.D. Fla. August 27, 2022) (Dkt. 29). Judge Cannon provides a "notice of [the court's] preliminary intent to appoint a special master".) Legal experts believed Trump's demand for a special master was a strategic error, according to The New York Times.

In a subsequent filing, the Justice Department reported that the government's review of seized materials had already been completed. (Note: Notice of Receipt of Preliminary Order and Attorney Appearance, In re Search of Mar-a-Lago, No. 9:22-cv-81294 (S.D. Fla. August 29, 2022) (Dkt. 31).) It explained that the FBI filter team had finished their examination of documents; "identified a limited set of materials that potentially contain attorney-client privileged information"; and were following relevant procedures to deal with privilege disputes. Criminal investigators would not be allowed to access or review such privileged documents. The completion of the document review by the government was seen as weakening Trump's efforts to get a special master appointed to review the materials recovered from him.

The DOJ also confirmed that they and the US intelligence community were conducting a classification review and damage assessment. They had been conducting a rolling review of the classified records taken from Mar-a-Lago since mid-May to determine their classification level and mitigate any immediate risk of the documents being held there. The filing also revealed that some of the recovered materials were so sensitive in nature that "FBI counterintelligence personnel and DOJ attorneys conducting the review required additional clearances before they were permitted to review certain documents".

=== DOJ response ===
On August 30, the Department of Justice filed its response along with a detailed timeline of events leading up to the search. According to The New York Times, the 36-page filing "made clear that prosecutors are now unmistakably focused on the possibility that Mr. Trump and those around him took criminal steps to obstruct their investigation".

The DOJ stated that, when they were present in the storage room at Mar-a-Lago during the June 3 handover of classified documents, they "developed evidence that government records were likely concealed and removed from the Storage Room and that efforts were likely taken to obstruct the government's investigation". The DOJ stated that Trump's counsel or custodian had never asserted that Trump declassified the documents or asserted executive privilege over them, but rather "handled them in a manner that suggested counsel believed that the documents were classified: the production included a single Redweld envelope, double-wrapped in tape, containing the document". The DOJ claimed that Trump's lawyers "explicitly prohibited government personnel from opening or looking inside any of the boxes that remained in the storage room" to confirm whether classified documents remained there. Though Trump's lawyers certified they had conducted a "diligent search" following the May 11 subpoena to prepare to hand over all subpoenaed material on June 3, the DOJ said that the FBI's search on August 8 "cast serious doubt" on those claims.

The DOJ stated that Trump lacked standing over presidential records since they are considered government property under the Presidential Records Act. They urged the judge to reject Trump's executive privilege claims: “The former President cites no case – and the government is aware of none – in which executive privilege has been successfully invoked to prohibit the sharing of documents within the Executive Branch." The DOJ argued that appointing a special master was "unnecessary" and would impede the ongoing criminal investigation and delay the intelligence community's classification review.

The DOJ attached a photo of a spread of classified documents laid out on the floor as evidence. Multiple red and yellow cover sheets bore classified markings of “Top Secret," “Secret" and "Sensitive Compartmented Information." Some were White House records marked "Confidential". Other records were marked with ORCON and NOFORN controls. Another "Top Secret" document had HCS-P/SI/TK control markings, indicating that they included details of human sources, electronic surveillance, and spy satellites.

The DOJ included a copy of its May subpoena to Trump from a DC federal grand jury after authorization for it to be made public from Chief Judge Beryl Howell in the DC District Court.

The DOJ also filed a more detailed Receipt for Property and a summary of the government's search, both under seal; (Note: Dkts. 39 and 40, In re Search of Mar-a-Lago, No. 9:22-cv-81294 (S.D. Fla. August 30, 2022).) on August 31, the News Media filed a motion opposing the sealing. (Note: The News Media's Joint Motion to Intervene for the Limited Purpose of Obtaining Access to Court Records and to Unseal Same, with Supporting Memorandum of Law, In re Search of Mar-a-Lago, No. 22-cv-81294 (S.D. Fla. August 31, 2022). The News Media are: ABC, AP, CNN, CBS, Dow Jones & Company (publishers of The Wall Street Journal), E. W. Scripps Company, The Palm Beach Post; Gray Media Group on behalf of WCJB-TV, WJHG-TV, and WWSB-TV, three local Florida television stations; NBCUniversal, The New York Times, Tampa Bay Times, and The Washington Post.)

=== Trump reply ===
On August 31, Trump's lawyers filed a 19-page reply. They claimed that "this 'discovery' [of classified information within the material recovered in January] was to be fully anticipated given the very nature of Presidential records", as such records often "contain sensitive information". They referred to the place where the documents were found at Mar-a-Lago as a "secure setting" and said it was "unjustified" for the government to "criminaliz[e]" the former president's possession of classified documents. Given their claim that it is not a crime for Trump to keep classified material in his personal residence, they said that if NARA believed its January 2022 negotiations had been unsuccessful in recovering all material, NARA should have asked Trump once again for his cooperation rather than referring the matter to the Justice Department. Trump's attorneys characterized the months they had resisted the government's efforts to reclaim his presidential records as the "standard give-and-take between former presidents and (the National Archives and Records Administration) regarding Presidential library contents."

They also said that, should Trump's request for a special master be granted, he "agrees that it would be appropriate for the special master to possess a Top Secret/SCI security clearance". They rejected the DOJ's assertion that it had screened out any attorney-client privileged records, arguing that their filter team had "virtually unchecked discretion" in addressing potential privilege disputes. Trump's lawyers requested copies of the seized materials, the search warrant, and unredacted copies of the underlying application materials.

== Hearing on September 1, 2022 ==
The DOJ argued that the FBI had already reviewed 520 pages from 64 document sets to look for privileged material and that Trump had no right to keep them or exert executive privilege over them, an assertion that Cannon pushed back against. Trump's lawyers argued the government had misconstrued the role of the Presidential Records Act. They also stated that Trump, while president, was allowed to designate records as "personal" outside the review of a court. They compared the conflict over the documents with an "overdue library book scenario".

Cannon ordered the DOJ to release the detailed property list they had previously filed under seal. Neither the DOJ nor Trump's team objected to making it public.

=== Release of detailed property list ===
The detailed property list was unsealed on September 2. The list showed that Trump had intermingled classified items with other items, like documents and photographs without classification markings, news clippings, unspecified gifts, items of clothing, and a book. A box found in Trump's office is listed as containing "43 empty folders with classified banners; 28 empty folders labeled 'Return to Staff Secretary/Mili[t]ary Aide'; 24 government documents marked confidential, secret or top secret; 99 news articles and other printed media; and 69 government documents or photos that were not classified."

== District judge's ruling and appeals court's reversal ==
=== Judge Cannon halts criminal investigation and orders appointment of special master ===
In a ruling on September 5, Cannon ordered DOJ to halt its review of the materials while allowing the intelligence community to continue its assessment of the potential harm caused to national security. She announced that she would grant Trump's request for a special master to review the seized documents for attorney-client and executive privilege and ordered DOJ and Trump to file a joint list of candidates "with the requisite security clearances and legal expertise" by September 9.

Among other reasons for appointing a special master, she cited an "interest in ensuring the integrity of an orderly process amidst swirling allegations of bias and media leaks" and the historic nature of the case, and that the Supreme Court "did not rule out the possibility of a former President overcoming an incumbent President on executive privilege matters." Cannon noted that the filter team had screened out medical documents, correspondence on taxes, and accounting information among "[p]ersonal effects without evidentiary value" as well as 500 pages of material potentially subject to attorney-client privilege. She criticized that in two instances the investigative team "had been exposed to" potentially privileged materials it then gave to the filter team.

==== Expert reactions ====
Legal experts called Cannon's order deeply flawed and giving special treatment to Trump. Other experts said that the judge did not seem to understand the nature of executive privilege and that there was no basis for her "to expand a special master's authority to screen materials that were also potentially subject to executive privilege". The New York Times noted that "The Justice Department is itself part of the executive branch, and a court has never held that a former president can invoke the privilege to keep records from his time in office away from the executive branch itself." Stanford law professor David Alan Sklansky emphasized the contradictions with a ruling that allows "the executive branch to use the files [to assess the risk to national security] while blocking it from using them for an active criminal investigation." Former Trump administration attorney general William Barr said that the judge was wrong in deciding that a former president can keep the executive branch from reviewing documents while investigating a potential crime by invoking executive privilege over those documents.

When Cannon struck two sealed motions filed by Special Counsel Jack Smith's team, she ordered him to address the basis in law of a Washington, D.C. "out-of-district grand jury" that was investigating the Trump case. Former federal prosecutor Joyce Vance wrote, (It's),"looking like a good week to ask the 11th Circuit to replace the judge." MSNBC legal analyst Katie Phang commented, "If the DOJ filed under seal certain documents and Judge Cannon just disclosed the existence of an otherwise confidential grand jury proceeding, we might be at the motion for recusal stage for the DOJ." Ex-U.S.Attorney Harry Littman similarly asked, (It's) "Hard to see how she can justify not sealing her order referring to another Grand Jury. Could this be a possible vehicle for taking her up and seeking her recusal?" Andrew Weissmann, a former member of Attorney General Robert Mueller's special counsel team said that her ruling "clearly shows her ignorance," and that Trump's alleged obstructing, "are charges that could have been brought in Florida or DC," so could be investigated in both venues," and, "...there was conduct that is alleged to have occurred," beyond Florida. Former Michigan USAG Barbara McQuade said Jack Smith "may need to politely tell Judge Cannon to butt out."

=== Judge Cannon appoints special master ===
On September 9, DOJ and Trump's lawyers submitted their joint filing, each side proposing two different candidates and differing views on the tasks and duration of the special master's review. DOJ suggested Barbara Jones and Thomas Griffith and Trump's legal team suggested Raymond Dearie (a senior judge of the U.S. District Court for the Eastern District of New York) and Paul Huck Jr.

A few days later, the DOJ filed papers saying that it would accept Dearie (one of Trump's two candidates) as a special master, while Trump's lawyers filed a document opposing both judges proposed by the DOJ. Trump's filing also suggested that some documents marked classified may not be and that Trump may have the right to have them in his possession.

On September 15, 2022, Cannon appointed Dearie special master, tasked him to review all documents seized in the August 8 search, and ruled that Trump would have to pay the costs. Dearie accepted the appointment.

=== Eleventh Circuit reverses district judge's halt to use of records in criminal investigation ===
In early September 2022, DOJ asked Cannon to rescind her rulings to have the special master review classified material and halt FBI access to classified material seized during the search, arguing that these materials were "inextricably linked with the criminal investigation" and noting that Cannon's orders had also halted the Intelligence Community's review of classified material. DOJ said it would appeal Cannon's rulings to an appellate court if she did not rescind them herself. DOJ did not oppose the appointment of a special master to review personal documents and "some other items". On September 15, Cannon refused to reconsider her rulings blocking the use of any of the material for investigative purposes pending the special master's review. She denied even the DOJ's request for a limited stay to allow investigators to once more access the approximately 100 documents bearing classification markings.

The next day, DOJ asked the 11th Circuit Court of Appeals to stay Cannon's rulings pending appeal, thus immediately allowing the criminal investigation to proceed. DOJ requested the right to review the classified documents recovered from Trump's residence; and to have such documents exempted from review by the special master. DOJ also argued that Trump's lawyers may be "witnesses to 'relevant events' in the criminal probe" and thus should not have access to such documents.

On September 21, the federal appeals court granted DOJ's request, restoring investigators' access to the recovered classified files and blocking the special master's access to such files. The three-judge panel unanimously declared it was in the public interest for DOJ "to determine whether any of the records were improperly disclosed, risking national security damage."

Trump asked the U.S. Supreme Court to vacate the Eleventh Circuit's September 21 ruling, arguing that the appeals court lacked jurisdiction over Cannon's order. DOJ opposed Trump's request. On October 13, the Supreme Court denied Trump's request to intervene in the case; no dissents were recorded.

=== Special master review ===
On September 20, at the first hearing about the special master's review, Dearie indicated that if Trump's lawyers "decide not to advance a claim of declassification", then he would accept the government's prima facie evidence that the documents remain classified, once that evidence is provided. During the hearing, Dearie said that he "can't allow litigation strategy to dictate the outcome of [his review and] recommendations to Judge Cannon", referring to vague declassification claims by Trump's side.

On September 22, Dearie gave Trump one week to formally submit any specific claim of inaccuracies with the inventory of seized documents, including if any of the materials listed "were not seized from the Premises on August 8, 2022". DOJ was also instructed to submit electronic copies of all unclassified documents to both Dearie and the Trump legal team by September 26.

On September 28, Trump's team objected, arguing that Cannon initially had not ordered them to confirm the inventory, that they could not review the classified documents because they no longer had access to them, and that Dearie had not given them enough time to review what they claimed to be nearly "200,000 pages". (This estimate was disputed at the time as much too large given the physical volume of materials seized.) On September 29, Cannon blocked several of Dearie's orders, agreeing with Trump's legal team on multiple issues and extending Dearie's deadline from November 30 to December 16. However, DOJ, in its October 14 brief before the Eleventh Circuit, countered that there were approximately 13,000 documents totaling 22,000 pages. Dearie then gave a precise count of 21,792 pages. DOJ said the Trump team's overestimation came from a company hired to digitize and database the documents.

On November 14, a pair of legal briefs were partially unsealed. In the arguments made to the special master, Trump's attorneys claimed that some of the seized documents were designated as "personal property" per the Presidential Records Act and may also be protected by executive privilege claims. DOJ argued that Trump's claims were faulty on multiple grounds, and that noted that Trump's lawyers had only claimed attorney-client privilege over one of the seized documents and executive privilege over 121 documents.

=== Eleventh Circuit reverses entirety of Judge Cannon's ruling and terminates special master review ===
On September 30, DOJ asked the Eleventh Circuit Court of Appeals for an expedited ruling on its appeal to overturn Cannon's order installing a special master and the "expansive powers" she had given him. Trump's lawyers opposed the request. The court agreed to expedite its consideration of the appeal, and heard oral arguments on November 22.

On December 1, the Eleventh Circuit ruled in favor of DOJ. The appeals court's ruling ended the special master review, allowed the government to use all the documents in its investigation, and directed the lower court to dismiss Trump's lawsuit. The three-judge panel unanimously rejected Trump's position, although all three judges were appointed by Republican presidents, and two were appointed by Trump himself (Judge William H. Pryor Jr. was appointed by George W. Bush and Judges Andrew Brasher and Britt Grant were appointed by Trump). The court ruled that Cannon lacked equitable jurisdiction to appoint a special master, that Cannon's decision did not meet the stringent standard for the judicial branch to intervene in ongoing investigations by the executive branch, and that the court would not make a special exception for former presidents. Trump decided not to appeal to the Supreme Court.

=== Judge Cannon dismisses case ===
On December 12, 2022, Judge Cannon dismissed Trump's lawsuit for lack of jurisdiction.
