= University of Michigan Journal of Law Reform =

- Discipline: Law
- Language: English
- Edited by: Nicole M. Sunderlin

Publication details
- History: 1968–present
- Publisher: University of Michigan Law School (United States)
- Frequency: Quarterly

Standard abbreviations
- Bluebook: U. Mich. J.L. Reform
- ISO 4: Univ. Mich. J. Law Reform

Indexing
- ISSN: 0363-602X
- LCCN: 76645375
- OCLC no.: 52756446

Links
- Journal homepage; Online archive; Heinonline

The University of Michigan Journal of Law Reform is a quarterly law review published by an independent student group at the University of Michigan Law School. It publishes articles and student-written notes that propose legal reforms. These reforms can occur in one of three ways: (1) changing the actual text of laws; (2) changing the enforcement of laws; or (3) changing the interpretation of laws.

Periodically, the journal hosts symposia where academics and policymakers discuss legal reform. Past symposia have focused on topics such as media regulation, market-oriented welfare reform, managed care reform, jury reform, and Title IX reform.

== History ==
The University of Michigan Journal of Law Reform was established in 1968 under the name Prospectus: A Journal of Law Reform. It was originally conceptualized as a faculty edited journal. Before the publication of the first issue, the untimely death of Frank E. Cooper, the first faculty editor, transformed the journal into a wholly student-run journal. Then-Dean Francis A. Allen authored the first article. In this Prospectus for Reform, he set two goals for the journal: "to report efforts to improve the law and its administration and to stimulate thought and ... action to this end," and "to enlarge the opportunities for law journal experience of students at the University of Michigan Law School." Starting with its fourth volume in 1971, the journal obtained its current name. David L. Callies served as the first managing editor. A year later, Ronald B. Schram became the first editor-in-chief. The first woman to serve as editor-in-chief was Margaret L. Houy. The current editor-in-chief is Kenneth W. Donaldson II.

== Selection ==
The University of Michigan Journal of Law Reform uses a competitive process that takes into account an applicant's writing sample, résumé, personal statement, and performance on a citation editing exercise. Applicants are also required to identify an area of law in need of reform that could serve as the basis for a note. The journal selects between 46 and 50 editors annually from the incoming second-year law school class.

== Notable articles ==
- Ellen Katz et al., Documenting Discrimination in Voting Under Section 2 of the Voting Rights Act Since 1982, 39 U. Mich. J.L. Reform 643 (2006).
- Lawrence W. Waggoner, The Uniform Probate Code's Elective Share: Time for a Reassessment, 37 U. Mich. J.L. Reform 1 (2003).
- Steven J. Markman, Forward: The Truth in Criminal Justice Series, 22 U. Mich. J.L. Reform 425 (1989).
- Herbert Hovenkamp, Derek Bok and the Merger of Law and Economics, 21 U. Mich. J.L. Reform 515 (1988).
- Senator Al Gore, Federal Biotechnology Policy: The Perils of Progress and the Risks of Uncertainty, 20 U. Mich. J.L. Reform 965 (1987).
- James Boyd White, Doctrine in a Vacuum: Reflections on What a Law School Ought (and Ought Not) to Be, 18 U. Mich. J.L. Reform 251 (1985).
- Wayne R. Lafave, Seizures Typology: Classifying Detentions of the Person to Resolve Warrant, Grounds, and Search Issues, 17 U. Mich. J.L. Reform 417 (1984).
- James J. White, Allocation of Scarce Goods under Section 2-615 of the Uniform Commercial Code: A Comparison of Some Rival Models, 12 U. Mich. J.L. Reform 503 (1979).
- Michael A. Woronoff, "Public Employees or Private Citizens: The Off-Duty Sexual Activities of Police Officers and the Constitutional Right of Privacy", 18 U. Mich. J.L. Reform 195 (1984)
