= Special master =

Judicial official appointed by judge

In the law of the United States, a special master is an official appointed by a judge to ensure judicial orders are followed, or in the alternative, to hear evidence on behalf of the judge and make recommendations to the judge as to the disposition of a matter. The special master should not be confused with the traditional common law concept of a master, a judge of the High Court entrusted to deal with summary and administrative matters falling short of a full trial.

In the federal judiciary of the United States, a special master is an adjunct to a federal court. Rule 53 of the Federal Rules of Civil Procedure allows a federal court to appoint a special master, with the consent of the parties, to conduct proceedings and report to the Court.

== Role ==
The role of the special master, who is frequently but not necessarily an attorney, is to supervise those falling under the order of the court to ensure that the court order is being followed and to report on the activities of the entity being supervised in a timely matter to the judge or the judge's designated representatives. Special masters have been controversial in some cases, and are cited by critics as an example of judicial overreach. For example, special masters have at times ordered the expenditure of funds over and above the amount appropriated by a legislative body for the remediation of the situation being examined. Their powers have generally been found to be valid and their remedies upheld by US courts.

The US Supreme Court will normally assign original jurisdiction disputes (cases such as disputes between states that are first heard at the Supreme Court level) to a special master to conduct what amounts to a trial: the taking of evidence and a ruling. The Supreme Court can then assess the master's ruling much as a normal appeals court would, rather than conduct the trial itself. That is necessary as trials in the US almost always involve live testimony, and it would be too unwieldy for nine justices to rule on evidentiary objections in real time.

In United States federal courts, special masters are appointed under Rule 53 of the Federal Rules of Civil Procedure. Rule 53 allows for a special master to be appointed only if one of the following exists: (1) the parties consent to the appointment, (2) to hold a trial without a jury or make recommended findings of fact where there is some exceptional condition or accounting or difficult computation of damages, or (3) address pre-trial or post-trial matters that cannot be effectively and timely addressed by a judge or magistrate judge.

== Examples ==
- Special masters were appointed by US District Court Judge Thomas Whitfield Davidson to investigate allegations of voter fraud on behalf of the 1948 Democratic Party primary campaign for Lyndon B. Johnson to the US Senate. According to Robert A. Caro, the masters would have found that Johnson's 86-vote victory was delivered by hundreds of fraudulent ballots, but the investigation was halted by the US Supreme Court on the grounds that the Democratic Party, not the federal government, was responsible for its primary elections.
- The usage of special masters in matters involving complex electronic discovery (or "eDiscovery") has been promulgated by the Academy of Court Appointed Masters (ACAM).
- The United States Court of Federal Claims operates an Office of Special Masters, informally known as the vaccine court, to resolve claims under the National Childhood Vaccine Injury Act.
- Cases involving special masters often involve situations in which it has been shown that governmental entities are violating civil rights. High-profile cases in recent years in which special masters have been used include some in which states have been ordered to upgrade their prison facilities, which were held to violate the US Constitution, which bars cruel and unusual punishment and certain state mental hospitals, which have been found so substandard as to violate the rights of their inmates. Summaries of cases involving special masters are published at Cohen's Special Master Case Reporter.
- Harvard Law professor Lawrence Lessig was appointed special master in the Microsoft antitrust case, but was recalled after objections from Microsoft.
- In the aftermath of the September 11, 2001, attacks in the United States, then-Attorney General John Ashcroft appointed Kenneth Feinberg as special master to oversee the dispensation of an $11 billion victims' compensation fund.
- The Waymo v. Uber lawsuit saw Judge William Alsup appoint a special master to determine whether Uber violated discovery rules in not disclosing the "Richard Jacobs letter."

=== Trump v. United States ===
On August 22, 2022, in the wake of the FBI search of Mar-a-Lago, the residence of then former U.S. President Donald Trump, Trump demanded the appointment of a "neutral" special master to review the highly sensitive documents seized during the execution of the search warrant for potential attorney–client privilege. US District Court judge Aileen Cannon, before whom the matter was set to be argued, expressed she was likely to agree. On September 5, 2022 Cannon granted the request, which was appealed by the Department of Justice on September 8, on the grounds that "[this] order would irreparably harm the government and the public by unnecessarily requiring the government to share highly classified materials with a special master".

On September 12, the DOJ approved one of Trump's choices, Raymond J. Dearie, for the special master role. Dearie's objectivity in this case was also questioned by news reports about the controversial role of the Foreign Intelligence Surveillance Court, of which Dearie was a member, during the FBI surveillance of Carter Page in the Crossfire Hurricane affair; according to insider sources, Trump's lawyers and advisers have purportedly expressed hope that Dearie has since become "a deep skeptic of the FBI".

However, soon after Dearie's appointment, frictions ensued when Trump's legal team did not provide proof of Trump's actually having declassified the documents, as he has repeatedly claimed to justify their presence at Mar-a-Lago, despite Dearie's requests. Instead, Dearie declared that if the Justice Department made "an acceptable case that they remain classified, then he would be inclined to regard them as classified" and thus not eligible for returning them to Trump's possession. Likewise, Dearie demanded proof of Trump's false claims that certain documents were "planted" by the FBI during the raid. Legal experts believed Trump's demand for a special master was a strategic error, according to The New York Times.

On September 29, Cannon ruled that Trump allegedly did not have to present evidence to the claim that the FBI had "planted" evidence against him, claiming, "There shall be no separate requirement on Plaintiff at this stage, prior to the review of any of the seized materials. … The Court’s Appointment Order did not contemplate that obligation," and extended the deadline for the files' review from November 30 to December 16.

On October 8, 2022, The New York Times reported that Trump had told advisers he retained the documents found by the FBI at Mar-a-Lago with the intention of pressuring the National Archives and Records Administration into trading them for files he thought would prove his claims that any Russian interference during the election was a "hoax". On October 14, the DOJ filed a request with a federal appeals court to end the special master review, calling it "unwarranted" since "[the] plaintiff has no plausible claim of executive privilege [...] and no plausible claim of personal attorney-client privilege". Dearie himself also expressed a similar assessment.

On December 1, 2022, the federal appeals court reversed the special master review, stating in a clear rebuke against Trump, "The law is clear. We cannot write a rule that allows any subject of a search warrant to block government investigations after the execution of the warrant. Nor can we write a rule that allows only former presidents to do so."

== See also ==
- Assessor (law)
