= Jack Smith (lawyer) =

American lawyer (born 1969)

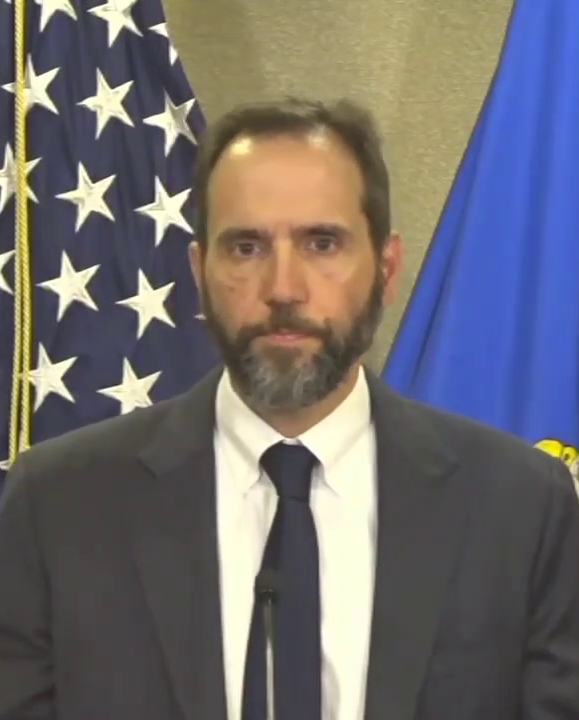
- Smith in 2023

Special Counsel for the United States Department of Justice
- In office November 18, 2022 – January 10, 2025
- Appointed by: Merrick Garland

Acting United States Attorney for the Middle District of Tennessee
- In office March 14, 2017 – September 21, 2017
- President: Donald Trump
- Preceded by: David Rivera
- Succeeded by: Donald Q. Cochran

Personal details
- Born: John Luman Smith; June 5, 1969 (age 57)
- Party: Independent
- Spouse: Katy Chevigny (m. 2011)
- Children: 1
- Education: State University of New York at Oneonta (BA); Harvard University (JD)
- Profession: Attorney

John Luman Smith (born June 5, 1969) is an American attorney who has served in the United States Department of Justice as an assistant U.S. attorney, acting U.S. attorney, and head of the department's Public Integrity Section. He was the chief prosecutor at the Kosovo Specialist Chambers, an international tribunal at The Hague tasked with investigating and prosecuting war crimes in the Kosovo War. He served as a special counsel for the Department of Justice from November 18, 2022, until his resignation on January 10, 2025.

In November 2022, U.S. Attorney General Merrick Garland appointed Smith as an independent special counsel, responsible for overseeing two ongoing Justice Department criminal investigations into former president Donald Trump, three days after Trump announced his 2024 presidential campaign: one regarding Trump's role in the January 6 U.S. Capitol attack, and the other into alleged mishandling of government records, including classified documents. The documents case resulted in a 37-count indictment of Trump in June 2023 with three counts added in July. In August, the January 6 case resulted in an indictment on four charges.

The classified documents case was dismissed by Judge Aileen Cannon in July 2024 on the grounds that Smith was unlawfully appointed as special counsel. Smith's office initially appealed the ruling, but ultimately abandoned the appeal after Trump won the 2024 U.S. presidential election. The election subversion case was dismissed by Judge Tanya Chutkan in November 2024 on the grounds that the Office of Legal Counsel held that Trump as president-elect could not be charged, consistent with the Constitution.

In Trump's second administration, the Office of Special Counsel announced on August 1, 2025 that it was investigating Smith, alleging his investigations into Trump's actions had been politically motivated. In December 2025, the U.S. House Judiciary Committee held a hearing for testimony by Smith regarding his investigation into the January 6 attack on the Capitol.

== Early life and education ==
Smith was born on June 5, 1969. He grew up in Clay, New York, a suburb of Syracuse. His father was a draftsman of air-conditioning systems. His mother was a homemaker for most of Smith's childhood. He is a 1987 graduate of Liverpool High School, where he played football and baseball. He studied political science at the State University of New York at Oneonta and graduated in 1991 with a bachelor of arts, summa cum laude. Smith attended Harvard Law School where he was awarded a juris doctor, cum laude in 1994.

== Career ==
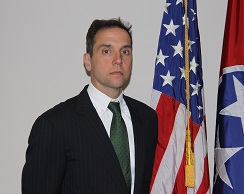
Smith in 2017 while acting U.S. attorney for the Middle District of Tennessee

After graduation from law school, Smith joined the Manhattan District Attorney's office, serving as assistant district attorney. He was a member of the sex crimes and domestic violence units of the DA's office. He joined the United States Attorney's Office for the Eastern District of New York in 1999. As an assistant U.S. attorney at the Brooklyn-based office, he prosecuted the police officers who brutalized and sexually assaulted Abner Louima, and led the case towards the death penalty—which was later overturned—against Ronell Wilson, who murdered two members of the New York Police Department. On one occasion, Smith reportedly slept in an apartment building hallway for an entire weekend so he could intercept a witness in a domestic violence case and convince her to testify.

From 2008 to 2010, Smith worked as investigation coordinator for the Office of the Prosecutor of the International Criminal Court in The Hague, Netherlands. In that position, he oversaw cases against government officials and militia members accused of war crimes and genocide. In 2010, Smith returned to the United States to become chief of the U.S. Department of Justice's Public Integrity Section (PIN). Among his first responsibilities was evaluating current investigations, and he recommended closing investigations into several members of Congress. (Note: Smith recommended closing investigations into senator John Ensign and representatives Tom DeLay, Jerry Lewis, and Alan Mollohan.) He spent five years as chief of the section, where he prosecuted a variety of corruption cases, including those against Virginia governor Bob McDonnell, U.S. representative Rick Renzi, Jeffrey Sterling, a Central Intelligence Agency officer who shared national secrets, New York State Assembly speaker Sheldon Silver, and North Carolina Senator John Edwards. McDonnell, Renzi, Sterling, and Silver were found guilty, though the Supreme Court later unanimously overturned McDonnell's conviction. Edwards's case ended in a mistrial.

In 2015, Smith became an assistant U.S. attorney in the Middle District of Tennessee, at Nashville. He became the acting U.S. attorney in March 2017 upon the resignation of David Rivera, and resigned effective September 2017 after the nomination of Donald Q. Cochran. Smith became the vice president and head of litigation for Hospital Corporation of America in 2017.

On May 7, 2018, Smith was named to a four-year term as chief prosecutor for the Kosovo Specialist Chambers in The Hague, investigating war crimes in the Kosovo War. During his time as the chief prosecutor, he brought charges against several individuals, including Salih Mustafa and the sitting president of Kosovo, Hashim Thaçi. He took up the post on September 11, 2018, and was appointed to a second term on May 8, 2022, before stepping down on November 18, 2022.

== United States special counsel ==
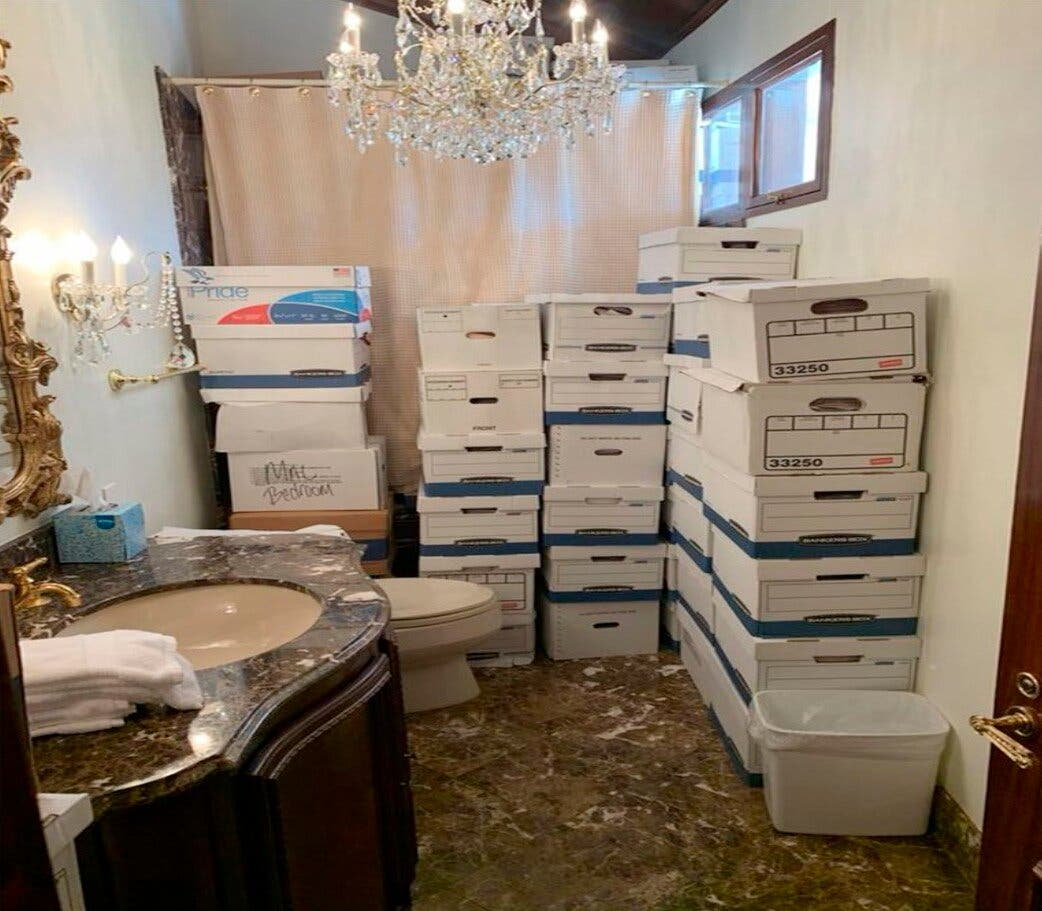
Document boxes in a Mar-a-Lago bathroom photographed by the Justice Department

On November 18, 2022, United States attorney general Merrick Garland appointed Smith special counsel to oversee the criminal investigations into Donald Trump's actions regarding the January 6 U.S. Capitol attack, and Trump's handling and storage of government records, including classified documents at his Mar-a-Lago estate. He worked initially from the Netherlands while recovering from a fractured leg, injured when he was struck by a scooter while cycling. By early January 2023, Smith had returned to the United States.

On June 8, 2023, a grand jury indicted Trump on seven federal criminal charges related to his handling of the classified documents. This marked the first time in American history that a serving or former president has been indicted on a federal criminal charge. After repeated delays and postponement of the trial, Judge Aileen Cannon dismissed the case on July 15, 2024 on the grounds that Smith's appointment as special counsel violated the Appointments Clause of the Constitution. On July 17, with permission from the Justice Department, Smith filed a notice of appeal to the 11th U.S. Circuit Court of Appeals.

On August 1, 2023, a grand jury indicted Trump on four federal charges related to his attempts to overturn the 2020 presidential election and his conduct during the January 6 Capitol attack. A year later, the Supreme Court decision on immunity directed Judge Tanya Chutkan to determine what parts of the indictment may proceed, based on whether each act was official or private conduct; whether the official acts are part of core constitutional duties; and whether prosecuting the non-core official acts would have any "dangers of intrusion on the authority and functions of the Executive." Before Chutkan could hold a hearing, Smith issued a superseding indictment rewording the charges to exclude Trump's attempts to pressure his Justice Department, but did not drop any of the charges.

The FBI investigation underlying Smith's January 6 case was internally code-named "Arctic Frost," opened in April 2022 and transferred to Smith that November. In 2023, investigators used grand jury subpoenas to obtain phone toll records from eight Republican senators and one congressman for four days surrounding January 6, 2021. Documents released by Senate Judiciary Committee Chairman Chuck Grassley in October 2025 showed the investigation issued 197 subpoenas seeking records on approximately 430 Republican individuals and entities. Grassley called it "an unconstitutional breach"; Smith's attorneys defended the investigation as "entirely proper" and approved by DOJ career officials.

Two weeks before Trump won the 2024 presidential election, he said in a radio interview that, were he to take office, "I would fire him [Jack Smith] within two seconds." On November 13, it was reported that Smith planned to step down before Trump took office. On November 22, it was reported that Trump was planning to use the Justice Department to investigate his 2020 election loss as well as to fire Jack Smith's entire team. In January 2025, Jack Smith provided the report to the attorney general (as he is required to do by law) and resigned his role of special counsel before Donald Trump took office. A 137-page part of the report about the election subversion case was publicly released. The other part of the report about the documents case was not immediately released.

On February 25, 2025, Trump revoked the security clearances of Smith's attorney, Peter Koski, a partner with the Covington & Burling firm, as well as the security clearances of everyone else in the firm who worked with Smith while he was special counsel.

On February 23, 2026, US District Judge Aileen Cannon, who had thrown out the case Smith brought against Donald Trump before he was re-elected president, ruled that Smith’s final report will not be released, arguing that "it is certainly not customary" for a prosecutor whose case was thrown out to later be allowed to "publicly disseminate large swaths of discovery generated in the case."

=== 2025 House Judiciary Committee testimony ===
On December 3, 2025, House Judiciary Committee Chairman Jim Jordan subpoenaed Smith to provide documents and testify at a closed-door deposition. The Justice Department sent relevant materials to Democratic members of the committee on December 15 and 16, and Smith appeared for the deposition on December 17. The committee did not have access to Smith's final report about the classified documents case, and Smith could not discuss it, due to a ruling by Judge Cannon. A Democratic interviewer (whose name was redacted from the transcript) complained of having had "less than 24 hours to review all these new materials prior to this deposition" and said "there is no reason at all" for Cannon not to release the final report, "besides, of course, the fact that Mr. Trump doesn't like what it says." The committee released the transcript of Smith's testimony on December 31.

In his opening remarks to the panel, Smith said: "The decision to bring charges against President Trump was mine, but the basis for those charges rests entirely with President Trump and his actions."

During the testimony, Smith said that "I did not have a preconceived outcome in mind when I took this job" in the sense that he did not know whether he would bring an indictment, but that the evidence obtained in the investigation "made clear that President Trump was by a large measure the most culpable and most responsible person in this conspiracy". There was "proof beyond a reasonable doubt that President Trump engaged in a criminal scheme to overturn the results of the 2020 election and to prevent the lawful transfer of power" and "powerful evidence that ... President Trump willfully retained highly classified documents after he left office in January of 2021 ... [and] repeatedly tried to obstruct justice to conceal his continued retention of those documents." He debated with his prosecutors whether to bring an indictment, and in both the election obstruction and classified documents cases, upon reaching a "final decision" to seek indictments, they acted quickly to do so.

Smith believed he had "strong proof" of the following pattern of Trump's behavior. When seeking advice on the question of whether he won the election, Trump "very consciously did not try to reach out to the sort of people who have the most expertise on these issues", according to Smith. Instead Trump sought people who told him what he wanted to hear, and he "latched on" to "any theory, no matter how far-fetched, no matter how not based in law" that supported him staying in office, and he "reject[ed]" information "that would mean he could no longer be President." This witness testimony would come from "Republicans who put their allegiance to the country before the party", that is, people who had been Trump's "political allies" and not only his "political enemies".

According to Smith, the First Amendment allows anyone to state (even falsely) that they won an election or that they believe they won it, but it does not allow people to make "knowingly false statements about election fraud to target a lawful government function". That behavior is itself the perpetration of a fraud, Smith said, and it is historically unprecedented.

Smith had previously offered to testify publicly; his attorney Peter Koski said Smith was "disappointed" that offer was rejected, but would appear and "clarify the various misconceptions about his investigation." Trump also claimed he would prefer public testimony, since "there's no way he can answer the questions." Representative Jamie Raskin criticized the closed-door format, saying Republicans wanted to "spin, distort, and cherry-pick his remarks through press leaks." Immediately after the December 17 testimony, Raskin told reporters that Smith had been "schooling the Judiciary Committee on the professional responsibilities of a prosecutor and the ethical duties of a prosecutor."

=== 2026 House Judiciary Committee testimony ===
Smith testified publicly on January 22, 2026 for several hours.

On July 22, 2026, House Republicans referred Smith to the Justice Department for prosecution, on the grounds that he should have volunteered more information when he was questioned about Arctic Frost.

=== 2026 Senate Judiciary Committee testimony ===
Smith agreed to testify for the third time in September before the Senate Judiciary Committee.

=== 2026 subpoena in Trump v. BBC lawsuit ===
In November 2025, a BBC internal memo was leaked. In the memo, editorial standards adviser Michael Prescott, writing to board members, alleged that a 2024 episode of Panorama had been misleading in its portrayal of Trump's behavior during the events of the January 6 Capitol attack. Prescott said this was part of a pattern of systemic editorial bias. Trump sued the BBC for $10 billion for defamation. On October 19, 2026, the BBC subpoenaed Smith's testimony, crediting Smith as perhaps the most "authoritative source" on the subject.

== Awards ==
- U.S. Department of Justice Director's Award
- U.S. Attorney General's Award for Distinguished Service
- Federal Bar Association's Younger Federal Attorney Award
- Eastern District Association's Charles Rose Award
- Henry L. Stimson Medal of the New York County Bar Association
- Harvard Law School Wasserstein Fellowship

== Personal life ==
Smith is a competitive triathlete, having taken up swimming when he was in his mid-thirties. He has completed more than 100 triathlons and at least nine Ironman competitions around the world. In July 2011, he married Katy Chevigny, a documentary filmmaker known for Becoming, a 2020 documentary about Michelle Obama. They have a daughter. The couple lived in the Netherlands starting in 2018, before moving to Washington, D.C. in December 2022, shortly after Smith was appointed as special counsel.
