= Samuel W. Buell =

American academic

- Education: Brown University; New York University School of Law
- Occupation: Law professor
- Employer: Duke University School of Law

Samuel W. Buell is an American academic. He is the Bernard M. Fishman Professor of Law at the Duke University School of Law. He specializes in white-collar crime and was a lead prosecutor for the Department of Justice's Enron Task Force.

Buell was quoted in The New York Times in March 2025, characterizing President Donald Trump's "retribution campaign against law firms," as "certainly the biggest affront to the legal profession in my lifetime."

== Works ==
- Buell, Samuel W. (2016). Capital Offenses: Business Crime and Punishment in America's Corporate Age. New York: W.W. Norton & Company. ISBN 9780393247831. OCLC 921868864.
