= Smith special counsel investigation =

Investigation into U.S. president Donald Trump

Volume one of Smith's final report addressing the election case

The Smith special counsel investigation was a special counsel investigation into efforts by Donald Trump to overturn the 2020 presidential election of Joe Biden that was opened by U.S. Attorney General Merrick Garland on November 18, 2022. Garland appointed Jack Smith, a longtime federal prosecutor, to lead the independent investigations. Smith was tasked with investigating Trump's role in the January 6 United States Capitol attack and Trump's mishandling of government records, including classified documents.

Smith moved quickly to advance his investigations, assembling a team of at least twenty DOJ prosecutors, and called witnesses for grand jury testimony, issued subpoenas to election officials in multiple states, and asked a federal judge to hold Trump in contempt for refusing to comply with a subpoena.

On June 8, 2023, a grand jury in the Southern Florida U.S. District Court indicted Trump on 37 felony counts, including charges of willful retention of national security material, obstruction of justice, and conspiracy, relating to his removal and retention of presidential materials from the White House after his presidency ended. Thirty-one of the counts fell under the Espionage Act.

On August 1, 2023, a grand jury for the District of Columbia U.S. District Court issued a four-count indictment of Trump for conspiracy to defraud the United States under Title 18 of the United States Code, obstructing an official proceeding and conspiracy to obstruct an official proceeding under the Sarbanes–Oxley Act, and conspiracy against rights under the Enforcement Act of 1870 for his conduct following the 2020 presidential election through the January 6 Capitol attack.

Trump pleaded not guilty to all charges in both indictments. Trials were scheduled but never held.

On July 15, 2024, Trump-Appointed U.S. District Judge Aileen Cannon dismissed the classified documents prosecution against Trump, siding with the former president's argument that Smith was unlawfully appointed.

On November 25, 2024, Smith announced that he was seeking to drop all charges against Donald Trump in the aftermath of Trump's victory in the 2024 United States presidential election. The Justice Department, by policy, does not prosecute sitting presidents of the United States.

Smith submitted his final report to the Justice Department on January 7, 2025, and resigned three days later. The part of the report about election obstruction was made public on January 14. The part about the mishandling of government records was not released at the same time because the Justice Department was still appealing the dismissal of charges against Trump's co-defendants in that case. The DOJ eventually dropped the cases against Trump's co-defendants on January 29, 2025.

== Origin ==
The order appointing Jack Smith as special counsel, dated November 18, 2022

On U.S. Attorney General Merrick Garland's confirmation as attorney general, the DOJ opened multiple investigations into events during the closing weeks of the Trump presidency.

One investigation involved the people and events surrounding the January 6 attack on the Capitol. In early 2022, the public became aware that the Justice Department was investigating the Trump fake electors plot.

In April 2022, the FBI opened the Arctic Frost investigation at its Washington Field Office to examine alleged efforts by Trump to overturn the 2020 presidential election. The investigation was opened with ASAC Timothy Thibault and ADIC Steven D'Antuono on the approval chain at the Washington Field Office, with additional approval from Attorney General Merrick Garland, Deputy Attorney General Lisa Monaco, FBI Deputy Director Paul Abbate, and FBI Director Christopher Wray.

The investigation issued 197 subpoenas seeking information about approximately 430 Republican individuals and entities, including requests to telecommunications companies for phone records of multiple Republican members of Congress covering January 4–7, 2021.

The investigation was transferred to Special Counsel Jack Smith's oversight in November 2022.

== Investigation of mishandling of documents ==
=== Developments ===
==== December 2022 ====
Smith asked Beryl Howell, chief judge of the DC District Court, to hold Trump in contempt for failure to fully comply with an August 2022 DOJ subpoena, as prosecutors suspected Trump may have withheld some documents subject to the subpoena; Howell declined to hold Trump in contempt, asking both parties to continue working toward a resolution.

On December 12, 2022, Jennifer Rodgers, a legal analyst for CNN, noted that DOJ (which had not yet charged Trump with a crime) would find it difficult to finish any hypothetical case before the 2024 presidential election. She said DOJ might prioritize charging Trump in the documents case given that a conviction might be reached more quickly than in the January 6 case.

Contractors hired by Trump in late 2022 found additional documents marked classified, and Trump attorneys gave them to the special counsel in December 2022.

==== 2023 ====
===== January =====
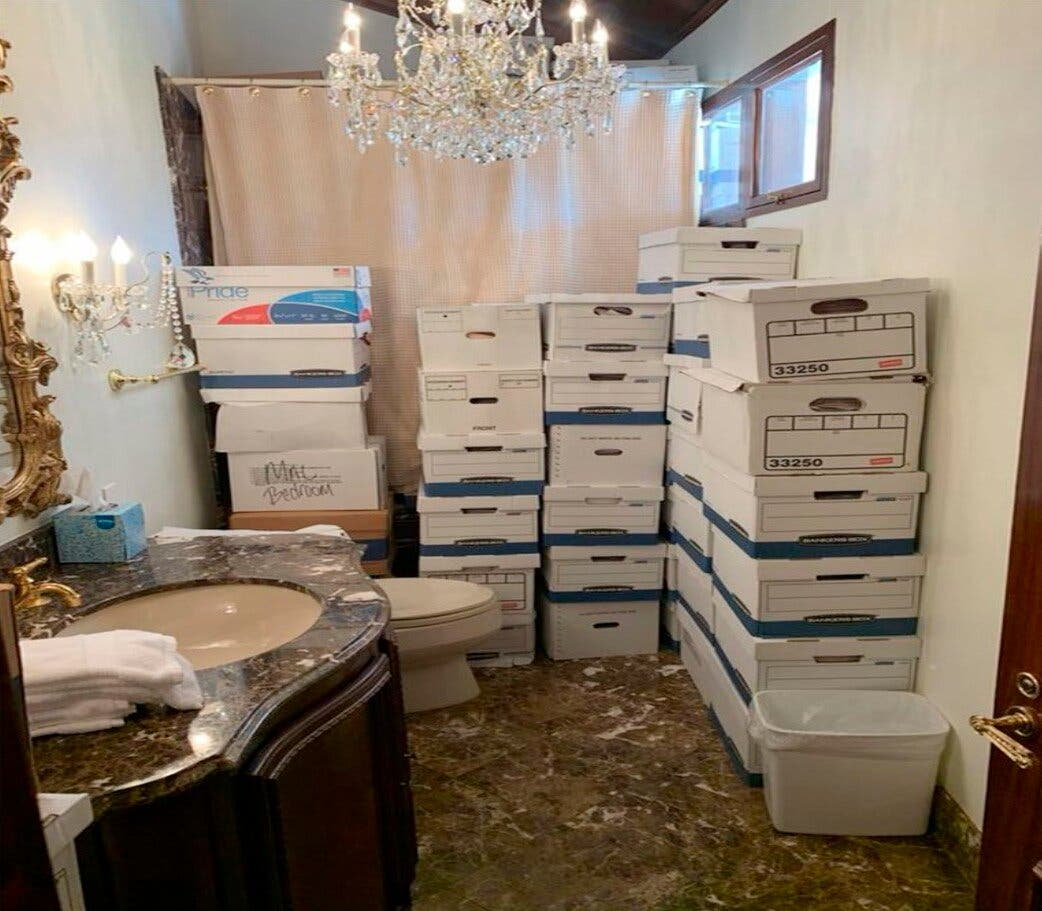
Document boxes in Mar-a-Lago bathroom

- Smith hired Raymond Hulser, former chief of public integrity at DOJ, and David Harbach, who had previously led cases against a U.S. senator and a governor.
- A laptop and thumb drive belonging to a former Oval Office aide, Chamberlain Harris, were handed over. Harris had scanned some documents, consisting of Trump's travel schedules, onto her two devices, evidently unaware they were classified.
- The special counsel subpoenaed an empty manila folder marked "Classified Evening Briefing" that had been found by the contractors in Trump's Mar-a-Lago bedroom. The folder had been reported to the special counsel but wasn't handed over until it was subpoenaed. One of Trump's lawyers claimed in February that Trump had been using the empty folder to shield an annoying light at his bedside.
- Trump attorneys Evan Corcoran and Christina Bobb testified before a grand jury. Corcoran had reportedly drafted a June 2022 letter, signed by Bobb, attesting that, in response to a subpoena, a diligent search was conducted and no classified documents remained at Mar-a-Lago; however, thousands of documents, over a hundred of which had classified markings, were subsequently found in the August 2022 FBI search.
- Trump attorney Alina Habba also appeared before a grand jury. Habba did not represent Trump regarding the documents matter, but she had spoken about it on television.

On January 12, CNN reported that the investigators sought to learn who was paying the legal bills of subpoena recipients.

On January 26, Senate Intelligence Committee chair Mark Warner said the committee wanted to see the classified documents immediately (the ones found in Trump's and Biden's possession) and did not want to "wait until a special prosecutor blesses the intelligence committee's oversight".

On January 30, the two people who had been hired to search four locations in October 2022 for classified documents —Trump's Bedminster golf club, Trump Tower in New York, an office location in Florida and a storage unit in Florida — testified before a federal grand jury.

===== February =====
In early February, the government offered to brief certain members of Congress—the leaders of the House and Senate, and the leaders of the intelligence committees—on the status of the classified documents investigation. It was also reported that more documents with classified markings had been found during a search of Mar-a-Lago "weeks" earlier, in the presence of Trump's legal team.

On February 16, former Trump national security advisor Robert O'Brien appeared before a grand jury. After being subpoenaed in both the documents investigation and the election investigation, he had tried to assert executive privilege to withhold some information. It was not immediately known before which grand jury he testified.

In February, Smith asked federal judge Beryl Howell in a sealed motion for approval to invoke the crime-fraud exception to pierce attorney-client privilege and compel Corcoran to produce documents and answer certain questions before the grand jury. The special counsel argued that Trump may have acted criminally by intentionally misleading his attorneys about his retention of classified materials. On March 17, Judge Howell ruled that DOJ had justified the crime-fraud exception, and she ordered Corcoran to testify again. Trump attorneys sought to block Corcoran's further testimony, but the DC Circuit Court of Appeals denied their appeal, and Corcoran testified on March 24. Subsequently, he recused himself—at least temporarily—from the Mar-a-Lago case, though he continued to represent Trump in the January 6 case. Under the witness advocate rule, lawyers who may be called as key witnesses are generally not supposed to represent clients at trial.

===== March =====
CNN reported on March 16 that the special counsel had subpoenaed at least two dozen people at Mar-a-Lago, from resort staff to members of Trump's inner circle.

In mid-March, Trump aide Margo Martin appeared before the grand jury. She was asked about a supposed classified document about a potential military attack on Iran, as investigators had obtained an audio recording of Trump saying he possessed it. Subpoenas were subsequently issued to Trump and to another person who attended the recorded meeting. The subpoenas sought the supposed Iran document and all materials related to it, including any materials related to Milley, maps or invasion plans. Trump's legal team produced some subpoenaed materials but were unable to find the purported Iran document.

===== April =====
The Washington Post reported on April 2 that investigators had obtained emails and texts of Molly Michael, a Trump White House and Mar-a-Lago aide, that provided a detailed account of movements at the resort during critical times. Investigators had come to suspect Trump had gone through boxes of documents after being subpoenaed, apparently to identify documents he sought to withhold. The Post also reported investigators were asking witnesses if Trump had shown any classified materials, including maps, to political donors.

ABC News reported on April 3 that multiple members of Trump's current and former Secret Service details had been subpoenaed for testimony in the documents case.

On April 13, former acting director of national intelligence Richard Grenell testified before a Smith grand jury regarding Trump's retention of classified materials. As Trump's acting DNI, Grenell declassified documents that Trump believed would delegitimize the Russia investigation. He remained in Trump's post-presidency circle of associates and had publicly defended Trump's documents retention.

On April 26, four Trump attorneys wrote Republican House Intelligence Committee chairman Mike Turner that the Justice Department "should be ordered to stand down" from its classified documents investigation, and legislation enacted to transfer the inquiry to the US intelligence community, asserting it was a civil case rather than a criminal case.

===== May =====
CNN reported on May 3 that in recent weeks new subpoenas had been issued to top Trump Organization employees, regarding the handling of Mar-a-Lago security footage after it had been subpoenaed in summer 2022, and conversations employees had about the footage. Matthew Calamari Sr. and his son Matthew Calamari Jr. were among several witnesses who testified before the grand jury investigating the mishandling of documents on May 4. Calamari Sr. is the longtime chief operating officer of the Trump Organization, primarily overseeing security operations for the company, while his son is a director of security. The footage reportedly captured Trump valet Walt Nauta and another Mar-a-Lago employee moving boxes out of a storage room, which Nauta told the FBI was at Trump's direction. Investigators had previously asked about a text message from Nauta to Calamari Sr. and subsequent conversations about the surveillance footage.

The New York Times reported on May 4 that the special counsel had gained the cooperation of an inside witness to help investigators determine how the materials were handled. Investigators came to believe Nauta had not given a full and accurate account of his activities, and indicated he might be charged, whereupon his attorneys ceased cooperating. Investigators asked witnesses about gaps in the surveillance footage, and had subpoenaed the vendor that provides the surveillance equipment for the Trump Organization. A subpoena had also been issued for records relating to Trump's dealings with LIV Golf, a Saudi-backed professional golf venture. The Times reported investigators were seeking to determine whether Trump paid for attorneys for witnesses based on their degree of loyalty to him.

In a May 16 letter to Trump, acting national archivist Debra Steidel Wall said NARA had sixteen presidential records showing Trump and his top advisors had been informed of "whether, why, and how you should declassify certain classified records." Wall wrote that Trump had tried to prevent the special counsel from accessing the sixteen records by asserting a claim of "constitutionally based privilege," which she rejected, advising Trump the records would be provided to investigators on May 24 unless a court intervened.

On May 17, Timothy Parlatore announced he was quitting Trump's legal team. He contended Boris Epshteyn hindered his access to Trump such that Parlatore could not provide adequate defense. Several other Trump attorneys had attempted to intervene with Trump to advise him Epshteyn was giving him rosy legal assessments in the face of dire circumstances. Parlatore also claimed Epshteyn tried to prevent the legal team from conducting searches for documents at Trump's other properties after the Mar-a-Lago search by the FBI. A Trump spokesperson said Parlatore's "statements regarding current members of the legal team are unfounded and categorically false." Epshteyn remained a top Trump advisor and coordinator of his myriad legal matters since Epshteyn's alleged involvement in efforts to overturn the 2020 election. He had been interviewed by Smith investigators in April 2023.

On May 19, prosecutors formally notified Trump's legal team that the former president was a target of the investigation in the documents case. Justice Department policy allows sending a target letter to afford a target an opportunity to testify to a grand jury before an indictment might be handed down.

The Guardian reported on May 22 that the Smith grand jury had about 50 pages of Corcoran's contemporaneous notes, following a DOJ subpoena to Trump for classified documents, indicating that Corcoran had explained to Trump that he could not retain these documents. The notes also contained details of how the documents had been stored and moved.

The New York Times reported on May 22 that the special counsel had subpoenaed the Trump Organization for records related to any business dealings it might have had with seven countries since the beginning of the Trump presidency. Investigators were seeking to determine if Trump's removal of presidential documents was related to any foreign business deals. The countries were China, France, Turkey, Saudi Arabia, Kuwait, the United Arab Emirates and Oman.

The Wall Street Journal reported on May 23 that the special counsel was wrapping up the documents investigation, suggesting an indictment might be near. Hours later, Trump attorneys wrote Merrick Garland requesting a meeting at his earliest convenience to "discuss the ongoing injustice that is being perpetrated by your Special Counsel and his prosecutors."

On May 25, The Washington Post reported that before being subpoenaed Trump and his aides conducted a "dress rehearsal" for moving sensitive documents. Two Trump employees moved boxes into a storage room the day before the FBI executed the search warrant. Investigators also developed evidence Trump had kept classified documents in his office such that they were visible, and sometimes showed them to others.

The New York Times reported on May 31 that former Trump White House staffers had been subpoenaed for information about the firing of Christopher Krebs. Krebs had been the Trump administration's top cybersecurity official, and he had concluded the 2020 election was secure. He was fired on November 17, 2020, two weeks after the election.

===== June =====
Three Trump attorneys met with Smith and others at the Justice Department in Washington on June 5 to argue that Trump should not be indicted in the documents case. Garland and his deputy Lisa Monaco were not present. NBC News previously reported that the grand jury examining the documents matter was expected to reconvene that week. A previously unreported Miami, Florida grand jury which had begun hearing evidence in May was also set to hear testimony in the documents case that week. The purpose of that grand jury was not immediately clear, though that federal judicial district encompasses Mar-a-Lago. Former Trump spokesman Taylor Budowich testified before that grand jury on June 7.

The New York Times reported on June 6 that Mark Meadows, a figure in both distinct lines of the special counsel investigation, had at some time testified before a grand jury, but it was not clear if he was questioned about one or both of the matters Smith was investigating. Meadows' attorney George Terwilliger on June 7 denied his client had accepted a plea deal but would not discuss whether Meadows received limited immunity for his testimony.

CNN reported on June 8 that a career White House official, who was in charge of advising the Trump and Obama administrations on the declassification process, told prosecutors that Trump knew the process and followed it at times while in office.

According to a transcript obtained by CNN of the July 2021 recording of Trump discussing an Iran document, Trump acknowledged the document remained classified, stating, "As president, I could have declassified, but now I can't." Trump added, "Secret. This is secret information. Look, look at this."

On June 23, in the documents case, the special counsel filed a motion requesting the trial date be moved from August to December to allow defense attorneys more time to obtain security clearances.

CNN reported on June 29 that the "representative of his political action committee" referenced in the June 2023 indictment was Susie Wiles. Investigators had questioned her extensively about any classified documents Trump may have shown her, including a map.

In late June, Smith met with Attorney General Merrick Garland regarding the election obstruction case, in which Smith had not yet brought an indictment. In Smith's closed-door testimony to Congress in December 2025, he described the meeting in this way: "I was presenting what I intended to do and he [Garland] had the ability to countermand it if he wanted to."

===== September =====
ABC News reported that longtime Trump aide Molly Michael told investigators that Trump repeatedly wrote her "to-do" lists on the backs of documents marked classified. Michael found the documents in her Mar-a-Lago office the day after the August 2022 FBI search and transferred them to the FBI that day. Sources told ABC News that after Trump became aware the FBI wanted to interview Michael, he told her, "You don't know anything about the boxes" and asked her to help spread a message that no more boxes existed, though she knew many more boxes remained in the storage room after Trump had relinquished 15 boxes to NARA. Photographs of the boxes Michael provided to Trump were included in his indictment.

===== October =====
ABC News reported Trump had in April 2021 discussed sensitive information about American nuclear submarine capabilities with Australian billionaire Anthony Pratt, who then shared the information with at least 45 others. The matter was investigated by the special counsel. Trump's alleged disclosures to Pratt included the number of warheads American submarines carry and how closely they can approach Russian submarines undetected.

==== Classified document about Iran ====
A key piece of evidence was a July 2021 audio recording, six months after Trump left the White House, in which he said he had a classified document about a potential military attack on Iran.

Days earlier, on July 15, 2021, Susan Glasser reported in The New Yorker that Chairman of the Joint Chiefs of Staff Mark Milley had discouraged military action against Iran, had also feared that Trump might stage a coup to remain in power, and had directed his deputies to ignore any illegal orders from Trump. Mark Meadows was holding a narrative contrary to Glasser's, namely that Milley had urged attacking Iran more than once and that Trump had rejected those recommendations. Trump was infuriated by Glasser's story, and he gave an interview to writers involved with Meadows's forthcoming memoir. Trump's aide Margo Martin recorded the discussion at his home in Bedminster, New Jersey. (Martin commonly did this to ensure writers quoted Trump correctly. Special counsel investigators obtained several if not all of the recordings made during Trump's book interviews.)

During the interview, Trump referred to a war proposal against Iran that had been drafted for him to consider in the closing days of his presidency. Of the document, he said: "It is like, highly confidential. Secret. This is secret information. Look, look at this." He added: "As president, I could have declassified, but now I can't." Media outlets were told the document was written early in the Trump presidency when Joseph Dunford and Jim Mattis headed the Pentagon. In the 2021 recorded interview, however, Trump asserted it was written by Milley ("this was him", Trump said multiple times), whom Trump had appointed but then had a falling-out with. Meadows similarly attributed the document to Milley in his memoir.

In a June 19, 2023, interview with Fox News anchor Bret Baier, Trump denied he had been handling a classified document during the 2021 interview, and rather claimed that they were "newspaper stories, magazine stories and articles." He added: "I don't think I've ever seen a document from Milley."

CNN aired a two-minute audio of the interview on June 26.

== Investigation of attempts to overturn 2020 election ==
Days after Trump was indicted on charges related to mishandling of presidential documents, The Washington Post reported the special counsel investigation was "barreling forward on multiple tracks" related to efforts to overturn Biden's 2020 election victory, including by the use of fake electors and fundraising pitches falsely claiming election fraud.

=== Mike Pence ===
On April 27, 2023, former Vice President Mike Pence testified before the grand jury.

==== Legal challenge ====
In early 2023, Pence was subpoenaed for documents and testimony, following months of negotiations between his legal team and prosecutors.

On March 3, both Pence and Trump filed separate legal challenges.

- Pence challenged his subpoena with a separation of powers argument. He argued that, as a vice president who was performing his job as president of the Senate when the election was certified, he was temporarily a member of the legislative branch, so the Speech or Debate Clause of the Constitution protects him from being "questioned" about his activity that day. A week earlier, influential conservative jurist J. Michael Luttig, who had advised Pence to not bow to Trump's 2020 election pressure, wrote in The New York Times saying Pence's objection would not succeed.
- Trump attorneys asked a judge to block Pence's testimony based on executive privilege.

Both Pence and Trump were expected to make these arguments in court on March 23. Their outcomes:

- On March 28, Judge James Boasberg ruled that Pence need not testify about his own actions on January 6 but must testify about his conversations with Trump. Pence decided not to appeal. On June 9, Boasberg said he planned to release the ruling.
- On April 26, a three-judge panel of the DC Circuit Court of Appeals unanimously denied Trump's appeal. Trump had sought to block Pence's testimony; he had filed the sealed request on April 10, and he had asked on April 14 to expedite it.

Pence testified before the grand jury the day after Trump's request was denied.

=== Developments ===
==== 2022 ====
===== November =====
Within days of his appointment, Smith began issuing grand jury subpoenas to local officials in Arizona, Michigan and Wisconsin, three key battleground states in the 2020 election, demanding they provide all communications they had with Trump, his campaign, and aides and associates.

===== December =====
By December, local officials in Georgia, New Mexico, Nevada and Pennsylvania had also been subpoenaed. Georgia Secretary of State Brad Raffensperger was issued a grand jury subpoena in December. During a January 2021 recorded phone call, Trump had pressured Raffensperger to "find" sufficient votes needed to secure his victory in the state.

CNN reported in December 2022 that Smith began investigating Trump's state of mind and what he knew about efforts by many to overturn the 2020 presidential election he had lost. Smith called key Trump White House personnel to testify before a grand jury, including White House counsel Pat Cipollone and his deputy Patrick Philbin, Trump senior policy advisor Stephen Miller and three other close aides to the president.

Smith's grand jury investigated fundraising and disbursements by Trump's Save America PAC, which had been created days after the November 2020 election. In late 2022, subpoenas were sent to Rudy Giuliani about payments he received from the PAC, and to other witnesses close to Trump. By February 2023, numerous Save America PAC vendors had been subpoenaed to determine how they had been paid and whether they delivered genuine services or concealed who had actually been paid.

On December 11, 2022, former U.S. attorney Preet Bharara noted that Smith had been hiring people who had "left their former positions, both in government and private practice", suggesting a major legal action in the works.

==== 2023 ====
===== January =====
Smith subpoenaed former Trump chief of staff Mark Meadows for documents and testimony.

In January, Smith's office obtained a search warrant for Trump's Twitter account, covering a period from October 2020 through January 2021. Twitter resisted a nondisclosure order preventing it from alerting Trump, and Judge Beryl Howell held the company in contempt. Though Twitter complied with the warrant and order on February 9, producing 32 direct messages along with other material, Howell fined the company $350,000 for having missed the deadline for compliance. The incident became publicly known in August 2023 with more details published in September. Smith obtained 32 direct messages from Trump's account; all accounts and usernames associated with Trump's account; all devices that were used to login to the account; and searches and advertising information associated with the account.

On January 26, former Department of Homeland Security official Ken Cuccinelli testified before the grand jury.

===== February =====
DOJ subpoenaed at least three Republican Arizona state legislators, and at least one former legislator. Naming 18 individuals, DOJ demanded their communications with Trump or his campaign members.

The Washington Post reported in February that soon after the election, the Trump campaign paid researchers from Berkeley Research Group to examine a wide range of indicators that might suggest the election had been stolen. Trump, Meadows and others were briefed on the findings in December 2020. The analysis found no significant irregularities beyond those commonly found in all elections, and nothing that might have changed the election outcome. The findings were never publicly disclosed, though the Justice Department obtained the analysis by subpoena. The Post reported in April that the Trump campaign had hired a second firm, Simpatico Software Systems, days after the election to examine fraud allegations. The company delivered a report late in 2020, finding no evidence of fraud. The company's founder was subpoenaed for testimony in early 2023.

===== March =====
Concurrent with her crime-fraud exception ruling, Howell also rejected Trump's claim of executive privilege and ordered grand jury testimony from former Trump officials Mark Meadows; director of national intelligence John Ratcliffe; national security advisor Robert O'Brien; senior advisor Stephen Miller; deputy chief of staff Dan Scavino; DHS official Ken Cuccinelli; and Trump personal aides John McEntee and Nick Luna. Trump's April 3 emergency motion to block the testimony was denied by a three-judge panel of the DC Circuit Court of Appeals overnight. Prosecutors interviewed Jocelyn Benson, the Michigan Secretary of State, about the impact of election misinformation.

===== April =====
The Washington Post reported on April 12 that in recent weeks the special counsel had subpoenaed a wide range of documents, including emails and texts, from numerous Trump associates and Republican operatives to compare what they had said privately about election fraud claims with what post-election Trump fundraising emails had said. The emails raised over $200 million in donations. Investigators were examining whether wire fraud had been committed by using false claims to swindle people out of money.

John Ratcliffe testified before a Smith grand jury regarding the aftermath of the 2020 election on April 13.

On April 25, Fox News whistleblower Abby Grossberg released a recording of Senator Ted Cruz planning obstruction during the vote certification. Grossberg had previously released recordings in which Trump lawyers Rudy Giuliani and Sidney Powell, speaking off-air with Fox host Maria Bartiromo, contradicted what they had said on-air about the election.

In April, an FBI agent and a prosecutor from the special counsel's office interviewed a former employee of Pennsylvania Republican donor Bill Bachenberg. This regarded Bachenberg's alleged attempt to access voting equipment in Pennsylvania coordinated with Sidney Powell. Bachenberg had helped organize Pennsylvania's fake electors and had been subpoenaed in 2022.

===== May =====
In late May, former Trump senior strategist Steve Bannon was subpoenaed for documents and testimony related to January 6 and Trump's efforts to remain in office.

On May 31, the Georgia secretary of state's office was subpoenaed for "any and all security video or security footage, or any other video of any kind" of the State Farm Arena polling place in Atlanta near the day of the 2020 election day.

===== June =====
Investigators interviewed Giuliani in late June. The interview was pursuant to a proffer agreement in which a subject of a criminal investigation agrees to provide certain information that would not be used against them in any future prosecution; a proffer can precede a formal cooperation deal. The New York Times reported Giuliani was asked about the fake electors scheme, the roles of John Eastman and Sidney Powell, as well as those at the Willard Hotel "command center" in the days leading up to the certification of the election, including Giuliani, Eastman, Steve Bannon and Trump attorney Boris Epshteyn. (Weeks later, when Trump received a target letter and Giuliani did not, Giuliani's political adviser, Ted Goodman, insisted to the press that Giuliani had not "flipped".)

CNN reported on June 29 that Mike Roman had entered into a proffer agreement with the special counsel investigation. Roman was a Trump 2020 campaign director of election day operations who was involved in the fake electors scheme.

The grand jury investigating the attack on the Capitol heard testimony from:

- June 8: Newt Gingrich. Gingrich, as the January 6 committee had found, consulted with senior Trump aides about television advertisements making false allegations of election fraud and played a role in the Trump fake electors plot.
- June 13: Nevada GOP Chairman Michael McDonald
- June 13: Republican National Committeeman Jim DeGraffenreid
- June 22: Gary Michael Brown, Trump's deputy director of Election Day operations in 2020. Brown has been accused of involvement with the fake electors scheme.
- CNN reported on June 23 that at least two fake electors had testified before the grand jury "in recent weeks" in exchange for limited immunity.
- NBC reported on June 26 that "five or six" Secret Service agents had testified before the grand jury. (Separately, in the documents case, "about 24" Secret Service agents had testified.)
- Trump inner circle aides Jared Kushner and Hope Hicks. They were asked about whether Trump had been told and had acknowledged he had lost the election. The New York Times reported that Kushner testified that it was his impression that Trump truly believed the election had been stolen from him.

===== July =====
Axios reported on July 5 that Smith had recently subpoenaed the Arizona secretary of state's office. Rusty Bowers, the Republican former Arizona speaker of the house, said on CNN that day he had been interviewed by the FBI a few months earlier but declined to discuss any subpoena. Bowers, who supported Trump in the 2020 election, had previously testified to the January 6 committee that Trump and Giuliani had called him after the election asking him to involve the legislature regarding what Giuliani said was proof of election fraud, with the objective of replacing Biden electors with Trump electors. Bowers declined to comply. He had told the committee that Giuliani never produced proof of fraud and had told Bowers, "we've got lots of theories, we just don't have the evidence." The Washington Post reported Trump had also called Republican Arizona governor Doug Ducey to pressure him to overturn the state's election results, and repeatedly asked Pence to call the governor.

CNN reported on July 6 that investigators had recently renewed interest in a December 18, 2020 Oval Office strategy meeting among Trump, Michael Flynn, Giuliani, Meadows, Powell, White House counsel Pat Cipollone, and others. The heated meeting included discussions of a Flynn proposal to seize voting machines, declare martial law and hold a new election under military authority, and a proposal to appoint Powell as a special counsel to investigate allegations of election fraud. Some witnesses to the meeting had been asked about it months earlier, while several others, such as Giuliani, had been questioned more recently.

On July 16, the special counsel's office sent a target letter to Trump's attorneys related to Trump's alleged efforts to overturn the 2020 election. The letter invited Trump to testify before the grand jury. It mentioned possible charges including conspiracy to defraud the United States, witness tampering and deprivation of rights under color of law. Two days later, Trump reportedly called Kevin McCarthy and Elise Stefanik for advice. Jack Smith did not comment to the press.

On July 18, CNN reported that former Arizona Governor Doug Ducey, whom Trump had pressured to overturn Biden's election, had been contacted by the special counsel's office.

On July 20, Trump adviser Will Russell testified to the grand jury for at least the third time. Previously, he was asked about fundraising; this time, he was asked about Trump's state of mind. There was a dispute over executive privilege.

CNN reported on July 20 that a former Trump lawyer was planning to speak.

Bernie Kerik's lawyer, Tim Parlatore, announced on July 24 that he had shared thousands of documents that had been subpoenaed from Kerik. Kerik had worked with Giuliani regarding claims of voter fraud in the 2020 election.

On July 27, the grand jury convened, and two of Trump's lawyers, John Lauro and Todd Blanche, met with Jack Smith. Blanche has also represented Trump in two other cases in which he has been indicted: the documents case and the hush-money case. Trump's team sought to delay the expected indictment but received no guidance on that point.

===== August =====
On August 1, Trump was indicted.

On August 7, federal prosecutors interviewed former New York City police commissioner Bernie Kerik, and The Washington Post reported that more subpoenas had been issued "in recent days...about the elector scheme in multiple states".

On August 10, the government asked the court for the trial to begin on January 2, 2024.

On August 28, the judge set trial for March 4, 2024.

===== September =====
CNN reported on September 5 that Sidney Powell's non-profit, Defending the Republic, had hired forensics firms that accessed voting equipment in Georgia, Pennsylvania, Michigan and Arizona, and that Smith was investigating how funds were raised for this.

The New York Times reported on September 8 that in October 2022 investigators met with Enrique Tarrio in Miami to tell him they believed he had communicated with Trump through at least three intermediaries prior to January 6. During a jailhouse phone interview days after his conviction for seditious conspiracy, Tarrio told the Times he was offered leniency if he confirmed their beliefs. Tarrio said he told them they were wrong and declined to name to the Times any of the individuals investigators had mentioned, though he specifically said the longtime Trump political adviser Roger Stone was not among them.

An FBI special agent completed a "preliminary toll analysis" on the phone calls of nine Republicans: Representative Mike Kelly and Senators Lindsey Graham, Bill Hagerty, Josh Hawley, Dan Sullivan, Tommy Tuberville, Ron Johnson, Cynthia Lummis and Marsha Blackburn. A toll analysis pulls historical records; it is not wiretapping, which by definition is done live. The agent determined which phone numbers the Republicans had called during the four-day period of January 4–7, 2021 and the time and duration of those calls. The completion of the task, nicknamed Arctic Frost, was documented by the FBI on September 27.

(In October 2025, some FBI agents who had worked on the subpoena were fired. FBI director Kash Patel told Fox News: "You're darn right I fired those agents". Patel claimed that Smith hid the phone toll records in a "lockbox in a vault, and then put that vault in a cyber place" and made them available to "no one"; Smith's lawyers subsequently wrote to Senate Judiciary Committee chair Chuck Grassley, reminding him that the phone toll records had in fact been shared with Trump's lawyers during the court discovery process. In November 2025, as part of a large bill to reopen the government from the 2025 shutdown, Grassley introduced a provision that senators could sue for up to $500,000 in damages if they had not been notified that their office had been subpoenaed. The provision would retroactively apply to investigations since January 2022. Graham said he would use the provision to sue the government. On November 19, the House voted to repeal the provision. In late January 2026, a government minibus funding package contained the repeal, and the Senate delayed voting on the whole package due to disagreement over the repeal.)

===== October =====
In October, the special counsel withdrew subpoenas for the Save America PAC and the Trump campaign, according to the New York Times and CNN. The subpoenas had sought information about their fundraising practices.

ABC News reported on October 24 that the special counsel had granted Mark Meadows immunity to testify before the grand jury under oath, one of at least three meetings with prosecutors in 2023. Meadows' attorney said the report was "largely inaccurate." The Guardian later reported prosecutors had sought the Meadows testimony by subpoena in March, but Trump tried and failed to block it based in part on executive privilege grounds. Meadows then apparently invoked his Fifth Amendment right against self-incrimination and refused to testify; judge Beryl Howell approved a special counsel request to order Meadows to testify under limited immunity such that his testimony could not be used against him in any future prosecution. Meadows said he had repeatedly told Trump during the weeks after the election that the allegations of significant voting fraud they were hearing were baseless and that as of his testimony he had seen no evidence of it. The Meadows testimony contradicted assertions in his 2021 memoir that the election was "stolen" and "rigged" with help from "allies in the liberal media." He said Trump was being dishonest when he first claimed to have won hours after polls closed on election day.

===== December =====
On December 11, Smith's office ordered transcripts from Eastman's disbarment trial. (Eastman had not been charged in this federal case, though he had been charged in Georgia.)

The FBI seized the phone of Republican congressman Scott Perry in August 2022. Perry sought to prevent investigators from examining the contents of his phone, citing immunity from criminal investigation under the speech and debate clause of the Constitution. After a protracted legal battle, on December 19, 2023 DC Circuit Court of Appeals chief judge Jeb Boasberg ruled that 396 messages on the phone were protected, while investigators could examine 1,659 others.

== Indictments ==
=== Classified documents case ===
Indictment of Donald J. Trump, Waltine Nauta, and Carlos de Oliveira, updated July 27, 2023

Trump was indicted by a federal grand jury on June 8, 2023, on charges stemming from the Smith special counsel investigation. The 37-felony-count indictment was filed in the District Court for the Southern District of Florida, based in Miami. Charges included illegal retention of government secrets, obstruction of justice, making false statements, and conspiracy to obstruct. Trump's arraignment, as well a brief arrest and booking, took place on June 13 at the federal courthouse in Miami.

Trump aide Walt Nauta, his White House valet, was also indicted on June 8, 2023. As conditions for his release, Trump was barred from speaking with Nauta and discussing the case with witnesses. Nauta was arraigned on July 6.

In a superseding indictment unsealed on July 27, Trump was indicted on an additional count of willful retention of documents, bringing his total counts on that charge to 32. Trump, Nauta, and Mar-a-Lago property manager Carlos De Oliveira were also charged with obstruction of justice related to their request to Trump information technology employee Yuscil Taveras to delete surveillance video footage to prevent it from being viewed by investigators. De Oliveira had worked at Mar-a-Lago for more than two decades, starting as a valet earning $12,000 in 2010 (equivalent to $18,000 in 2025), and had been promoted to becoming the club's property manager in 2022. The footage had recently been subpoenaed by a Smith grand jury. The superseding indictment alleged De Oliveira told Taveras "that 'the boss' wanted the server deleted," and Taveras replied "that he would not know how to do that, and that he did not believe that he would have the rights to do that."

Like Nauta and several others associated with Trump, Taveras had been provided legal representation by Stan Woodward, whose legal fees were paid or by Trump's Save America PAC. After Taveras received a target letter following the initial indictment of Trump and Nauta, and was told that Woodward might have a conflict of interest, in July 2023 he dropped Woodward and retained a different attorney who was independent of Trump, retracted his previous false grand jury testimony given while represented by Woodward, and implicated the three other men in an alleged conspiracy to delete surveillance video at the Florida property that implicated Trump. The new indictment alleged that – despite Trump's denial one month earlier – he had shown a top secret war plan document related to Iran to individuals lacking security clearances at his Bedminster home in 2021. The New York Times reported prosecutors had the document in their possession.

=== 2020 election case ===
Indictment of Donald J. Trump filed on 1 Aug 2023 [45 pages]

On August 1, 2023, Trump was indicted by a grand jury in the 2020 election case on four charges: conspiracy to defraud the United States; conspiracy to obstruct an official proceeding; obstruction of and attempt to obstruct an official proceeding; and conspiracy against rights. The case was in the U.S. District Court for the District of Columbia; Judge Tanya Chutkan was randomly assigned to it.

At a hearing on August 28, prosecutor Molly Gaston complained that Trump was posting to social media about the case and argued that a swifter trial would be appropriate. Prosecutor Tom Windom argued that the defense would not need extra time to prepare for classified evidence because, while several classified documents had been produced in discovery, the government did not expect to present any classified documents at trial.

Trump asked the DC Circuit Court of Appeals on December 7 to decide whether he was immune from prosecution. Though Judge Chutkan had set a trial date for early 2024, she paused deadlines in the case while the appeals court decided that question. When the appeals court said Trump was not immune, Trump then turned to the Supreme Court, which ruled on July 1, 2024, that he did have immunity for official acts and that official acts could not be used as evidence either.

The special counsel then filed a superseding indictment on August 27. None of the four charges were dropped, but the new indictment omitted mention of some of Trump's alleged activities that were "official acts" (like conversations with the Justice Department). Trump was arraigned on September 5.

Following Trump's election to the presidency in November, Smith filed a motion to dismiss the case without prejudice, given that the Justice Department does not prosecute sitting presidents. On November 25, Judge Chutkan approved the request and dismissed the charges.

== Reactions ==
On December 11, 2022, former U.S. attorney Preet Bharara predicted that the DOJ would bring charges in the election case in January.

On July 11, 2023, Ty Cobb, who had served as a White House attorney during the Trump administration, said "I think they [DOJ] are ready to go" with a federal indictment related to January 6, though Cobb said they must be facing "some difficult decisions" regarding what kind of charges to bring.

On July 20, 2023, four days after the special counsel's office notified Donald Trump he was a target in the election investigation, Trump posted audio of himself saying: "If you f**k around with us, if you do something bad to us, we are going to do things to you that have never been done before." (The audio was recorded in 2020 regarding Iran. It was spliced into a video showing Trump's 2024 campaign logo.)

By August, House Republicans were seeking to use their power of the purse to halt investigations and prosecutions of Trump. Some proposed leveraging the looming September 30 deadline to fund the government for the coming year in order to trigger a federal shutdown, though none of the federal or state actions against Trump would be affected by a shutdown.

Republican chairman of the House Judiciary Committee Jim Jordan announced on September 7, 2023, that he was opening an investigation into the special counsel's office related to allegations of prosecutorial abuse. Jordan alleged that Jay Bratt, one of Smith's senior prosecutors, "improperly pressured" Stan Woodward "by implying that the Administration would look more favorably" on his candidacy for a judgeship if his client, Walt Nauta, chose to cooperate with special counsel investigators. In November 2024, the Office of Professional Responsibility opened an investigation concerning Jordan's allegations.

In September 2023, war crimes prosecutor Alex Whiting joined Smith's team.

== Smith's resignation after Trump's 2024 election ==
Following Trump's election on November 5, 2024, the election obstruction case was still active, and the special counsel had an active appeal of the dismissal of the documents case.

On November 8, Texas Attorney General Ken Paxton made a Freedom of Information Act Request to the Department of Justice asking for records of the special counsel investigation. He asked for every communication the special counsel's office had ever sent to "any New York State governmental office", "the Fulton County District Attorney's office", "any Congressional office", "any governmental or law enforcement officer in the State of Texas", along with all documentation of the special counsel's "final reasoning to request that a trial against President-elect Trump to start in January of 2024" and "all mobile numbers" of the special counsel's staff.

On November 24, Senator Eric Schmitt said Justice Department staff who worked on the cases "should be fired immediately."

On November 25, Smith motioned to have the election obstruction case dismissed. He wrote:

"After careful consideration, the [Justice] Department has determined that OLC's [the Justice Department's Office of Legal Counsel's] prior opinions concerning the Constitution's prohibition on federal indictment and prosecution of a sitting President apply to this situation and that as a result this prosecution must be dismissed before the defendant is inaugurated. That prohibition is categorical and does not turn on the gravity of the crimes charged, the strength of the Government's proof, or the merits of the prosecution, which the Government stands fully behind."

Former U.S. attorney Barbara McQuade noted that Smith chose to "explain his reasons for dismissing the case, rather than allowing Trump's future AG to mischaracterize them". She said this might be "an effort to keep the cases alive in the long term" so that another prosecutor can pick them up in 2029.

Smith was expected to submit court filings on December 2 explaining how he would wind down the cases. He resigned in January 2025 before Trump's inauguration, amid the general understanding that Trump, upon taking office, would have fired his entire team anyway. Trump had said he would use the Justice Department to investigate his 2020 election loss.

== Final report ==
Through 2024, the special counsel prepared a two-volume final report: the first volume about the election obstruction case, and the second volume about the classified documents case.

Trump's lawyers were allowed to review Smith's final report from January 3–6, 2025 in a room where they could not use their electronic devices. They objected to the report's release. On January 6, Walt Nauta and Carlos De Oliveira (who could still face criminal charges in the classified documents case) asked the 11th Circuit Court of Appeals to stop its release to avoid influencing their case, and the next day, Judge Aileen Cannon blocked the report's release until three days after the 11th Circuit decided. Later in the evening on January 7, the special counsel provided both volumes to the attorney general, and the next day, the Department of Justice said it would release the first volume publicly and may provide a redacted version of the second volume for a limited review by select members of Congress. On January 9, the 11th Circuit allowed the release of the first volume, and on January 13, Cannon said she would likewise allow it, given that her own authority was limited to the classified documents case.

On January 14, 2025, the 137-page first volume was publicly released.

Judge Cannon ruled that the second volume (and the information within it) could not be shared outside the Department of Justice. However, Carmen Mercedes Lineberger, a former managing assistant US attorney in the Southern District of Florida, had received a copy days before Cannon's ruling, and after the ruling, she allegedly emailed it to herself, allegedly once in September and again in December 2025, with subject lines and filenames to disguise it as a cake recipe. Lineberger was charged with two felony counts. During the discovery process, the Department of Justice inadvertently provided her lawyers with a copy. The parties notified the court of this incident on July 2.

== Second Trump presidency ==
After Trump took office, some officials who had investigated crimes related to the Capitol attack as well as the classified documents case were swiftly fired. About two weeks into the Trump administration, lawyers representing fired officials wrote to deputy acting Attorney General Emil Bove saying that the officials' simple due process rights may have been violated and that these officials were further concerned that their names would be publicized. The lawyers threatened to sue the Department of Justice if the firings continued.

On February 4, responding to a Justice Department order to name which of its 38,000 employees had worked on the Capitol attack investigations, the FBI identified over 5,000 people by their employee IDs. The FBI Agents Association had filed a restraining order to attempt to prevent the release of information; after the FBI provided the employee IDs to the Department of Justice, it sued. On February 6, the corresponding employee names were provided by the FBI to the Department of Justice through a system for handling classified information. On April 30, Margaret Donovan, an attorney for the FBI agents, told U.S. District Judge Jia Cobb that the government had been "vague" about what it planned to do with this list of names.

On August 1, the Office of Special Counsel announced it had opened an investigation into Smith, alleging that his investigations into Trump had been politically motivated. Former federal prosecutor Andrew Weissmann opined on MSNBC that bringing a case against Smith "is the last thing that you would think the Trump administration and Trump himself would want. He spent years trying to avoid — and largely being successful at avoiding — any of these cases going to trial. And if he's going to have a trial here, that's going to be a forum for Jack Smith and people to put on the evidence that he has tried for so long to avoid."

On October 23, Smith's lawyers Lanny Breuer and Peter Koski wrote to Representative Jim Jordan and Senator Chuck Grassley, chairs of the House and Senate Judiciary Committees, requesting that Smith have "the opportunity to testify in open hearings before the House and Senate Judiciary Committees." They added that Smith "is prepared to answer questions about the Special Counsel's investigation and prosecution, but requires assurance from the Department of Justice that he will not be punished for doing so." As Smith was no longer special counsel, his lawyers said the government would need to restore his access to the relevant files. They requested Justice Department guidance on "federal grand jury secrecy requirements and authorization on the matters he may speak to," especially given that the second volume of the special counsel's final report had never been publicly released.

In Truth Social posts on October 29 and 30, Trump called Smith "a criminal" who should be in prison. In the second post, which did not refer to Smith by name, Trump said: "I beat him badly, and love watching him squirm now."

== See also ==
- FBI investigation into Donald Trump's handling of government documents
- Mueller special counsel investigation
- Public hearings of the United States House Select Committee on the January 6 Attack
- United States Justice Department investigation into attempts to overturn the 2020 presidential election
- Arctic Frost investigation
