= Chamberlain Harris =

American political aide (born 1999)

Deputy Director of Oval Office Operations
- Incumbent
- Assumed office January 20, 2025
- President: Donald Trump
- Director: Walt Nauta
- Preceded by: Julia Reed

Member of the United States Commission of Fine Arts
- Incumbent
- Assumed office February 19, 2026
- Appointed by: Donald Trump

Receptionist of the United States
- In office September 4, 2020 – January 20, 2021
- President: Donald Trump
- Preceded by: Kathleen Porter
- Succeeded by: Jacob Spreyer

Personal details
- Born: Chamberlain Harris; October 16, 1999 (age 27)
- Education: University at Albany, SUNY (BA)

Chamberlain R. Harris (born October 16, 1999) is an American political aide who has served as the deputy director of Oval Office operations since 2025. Harris has additionally served as a member of the United States Commission of Fine Arts since 2026. She served as the receptionist of the United States from 2020 to 2021.

== Early life and education (1999–2021) ==
Chamberlain R. Harris was born on October 16, 1999. In 2019, Harris graduated from the University at Albany, SUNY with a degree in political science and minors in communications and economics. Her honors thesis concerned the similarities between the communications strategies of presidents Barack Obama and Donald Trump.

== Career ==
=== Receptionist of the United States (2020–2021) ===
By September 2020, Harris had worked as a staff assistant in the Office of Administration. That month, she was appointed the receptionist of the United States. According to Venmo transactions obtained by NOTUS, Harris participated in "Not a goodbye party" after Donald Trump's loss the 2020 presidential election.

=== Post-government work (2021–2024) ===
Harris began working for Trump's political action committee, Save America, by July 2021, and his re-election campaign by December 2022. In February 2023, The Guardian reported that a junior aide had kept a box of White House schedules—including classified documents—at a guest bungalow at Mar-a-Lago after Trump left office, later taking the box with her to a government-leased office. The aide was relocated to a desk in the anteroom of Trump's office at Mar-a-Lago previously occupied by Molly Michael in September 2022, after Mar-a-Lago was raided by the Federal Bureau of Investigation as its investigation into Trump's handling of government documents intensified. After the documents were discovered by private contractors in December, Harris disclosed that she had been told by Michael to scan the schedules to her laptop.

=== Deputy director of Oval Office operations (2025–present) ===
In January 2025, Trump named Harris as his deputy director of Oval Office operations. In December 2025, Trump gave Harris a $45,000 cash gift, which Mother Jones reported as a likely violation of finance law for federal employees. In January 2026, Trump appointed her to the United States Commission of Fine Arts. Harris was sworn into the position in February. The commission, including Harris, voted unanimously to approve the White House State Ballroom that month.
