= Walter Giardina =

American FBI agent

Walter Giardina is a former American Federal Bureau of Investigation (FBI) special agent who served for approximately 20 years. He was fired by FBI Director Kash Patel in August 2025. Giardina worked on several high-profile investigations, including the Mueller investigation and the arrest of Trump adviser Peter Navarro.

== Career ==
Giardina served in the United States Marine Corps prior to joining the FBI. He joined the bureau in 2005 and was assigned to the Washington Field Office.

Giardina was assigned to Special Counsel Robert Mueller's investigation into Russian interference in the 2016 presidential election.

In August 2022, Giardina was involved in the arrest of White House trade adviser Peter Navarro at Ronald Reagan Washington National Airport. Navarro was taken into custody on contempt of Congress charges for refusing to comply with a subpoena from the January 6 Committee.

== Arctic Frost investigation ==
According to Republican Senator Chuck Grassley, whistleblower disclosures identified Giardina as the "author of that targeting list" for the Arctic Frost investigation, an FBI investigation into efforts to overturn the 2020 presidential election. Grassley stated on the Senate floor that Giardina's name appeared in communications regarding adding President Trump as a subject to the investigation, and that whistleblowers alleged Giardina "openly stated his desire to investigate Trump, even if it meant false predication." Giardina was listed as a point of contact on numerous subpoenas issued during the investigation.

== Termination and lawsuit ==
On August 8, 2025, Giardina was terminated by FBI Director Kash Patel. In his termination letter, Patel accused Giardina of "poor judgment and a lack of impartiality in carrying out duties, leading to the political weaponization of the government." Giardina's wife had died of cancer three weeks prior to his termination.

In September 2025, Giardina and fellow terminated agent Christopher Meyer filed a lawsuit against Patel, alleging their firings were politically motivated and violated their constitutional and statutory rights. Their attorneys stated that the terminations followed "false public claims about their roles in politically sensitive investigations."

== See also ==
- Timothy Thibault
