= Margo Martin =

American political advisor (born 1995)

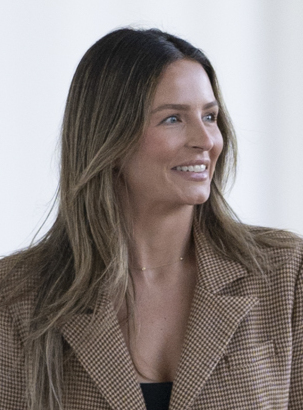
- Martin in 2025

White House Communications Advisor
- Incumbent
- Assumed office January 20, 2025
- President: Donald Trump
- Preceded by: Position established

Personal details
- Born: Margo Mcatee Martin; July 24, 1995 (age 31) Dallas, Texas, U.S.
- Party: Republican
- Education: Texas Christian University

Margo Mcatee Martin (born July 24, 1995) is an American spokesperson and political advisor who has served as the White House communications advisor since 2025.

== Early life ==
Margo Mcatee Martin was born on July 24, 1995, in Dallas, Texas. Her sister, Markie, is an anchor for NewsNation. Martin was raised in Ada, Oklahoma. She attended Ada High School and was named to the Oklahoma Coaches Association's All-State tennis team in 2013. Martin attended Texas Christian University.

== Career ==
=== White House press assistant (2019–2021) ===
By July 2019, Martin had served as a press assistant in the White House Office of the Press Secretary. She continued to serve in the position through January 2021.

=== Deputy communications director (2021–2025) ===
After the inauguration of Joe Biden, Martin moved to West Palm Beach, Florida, to assist outgoing president Donald Trump in his transition process. She became the lead press secretary for Trump's office in February. By July, she had become the deputy director of communications for Save America, Trump's political action committee. Martin routinely taped interviews Trump gave for books written about him; one such interview, conducted that month, revealed that Trump was aware one document in his possession was not declassified. The recording of the interview was obtained by federal prosecutors in the Smith special counsel investigation. Martin and her devices were subpoenaed, and she appeared before a grand jury in March 2023. The recording was used to seek her testimony. By February 2024, The New York Times considered Martin one of Trump's "closest personal aides". In September, she was sued by the White Stripes over a campaign video that included a segment of "Seven Nation Army".

=== Special assistant to the president (2025–present) ===
By January 2025, Trump had not announced a position for Martin. She has served as special assistant to the president and communications advisor as early as March. An analysis by The New York Times found that Martin was one of several Trump aides who is situated between the Cabinet Room and the Oval Office. In December 2025, Trump gave Martin a $45,000 cash gift, which Mother Jones reported as a likely violation of finance law for federal employees.

== Works cited ==
=== Articles ===
- "25 Things you should know about Markie Martin". KOCO-TV. December 5, 2014.
- Bade, Rachael; Lizza, Ryan; Palmeri, Tara; Daniels, Eugene (July 29, 2021). "McConnell's Herschel Walker problem". Politico.
- Chute, Nate (June 13, 2023). "Oklahoma native dubbed 'Fake Melania' seen outside Trump arraignment". The Oklahoman.
- Easley, Jonathan; Samuels, Brett; Chalfant, Morgan (February 10, 2021). "Trump mum as Senate debates his role in inciting Capitol mob". The Hill.
- Haberman, Maggie; Swan, Jonathan; Feuer, Alan (May 31, 2023). "Trump Was Taped Discussing Sensitive Document He Had Kept After Leaving Office". The New York Times.
- Haberman, Maggie; Swan, Jonathan; Feuer, Alan (June 1, 2023). "Recording of Trump Underscores Growing Evidence in Documents Case". The New York Times.
- Helderman, Rosalind; Dawsey, Josh; Parker, Ashley; Alemany, Jacqueline (December 18, 2022). "How Trump jettisoned restraints at Mar-a-Lago and prompted legal peril". The Washington Post.
- Johnson, Brian (May 20, 2013). "Ada tennis trio named to All-State team". The Ada News.
- Kumar, Anita; McGraw, Meridith; Grunwald, Michael (January 20, 2021). "Donald Trump leaves as he arrived, minus his microphone". Politico.
- Lee, Junho; Shao, Elena; Haberman, Maggie; Mills, Doug (April 21, 2025). "Who Sits Where in Trump's West Wing". The New York Times.
- Mealins, Evan; Gibbs, Audrey (September 9, 2024). "The White Stripes sue Trump over use of 'Seven Nation Army' in social media video". The Tennessean.
- Ostly, Ayrton (March 7, 2025). "Falcons QB Kirk Cousins meets with President Trump in Oval Office". USA Today.
- Palmer, Anna; Sherman, Jake (July 24, 2019). "How to think about today's Mueller extravaganza". Politico.
- Rogers, Katie (January 29, 2021). "Job Seekers With Trump White House on Their Résumés Face a Cold Reality". The New York Times.
- Samuels, Brett (January 7, 2025). "Trump's America First becomes America expands". The Hill.
- Sands, Leo (September 10, 2024). "White Stripes sue Donald Trump over use of 'Seven Nation Army' in video". The Washington Post.
- Swan, Jonathan; Haberman, Maggie; Goldmacher, Shane (February 5, 2024). "How Trump Uses the Power and Imagery of His Presidency". The New York Times.
- Viswanatha, Aruna; Gurman, Sadie (June 23, 2023). "Trump Prosecutors Struggled Over Motives. Then They Heard the Tape". The Wall Street Journal.

=== Documents ===
- "Margo Mcatee Martin in the Texas, U.S., Birth Index, 1903-1997" (Document). Birth Index.
