= Steven M. D'Antuono =

American FBI official

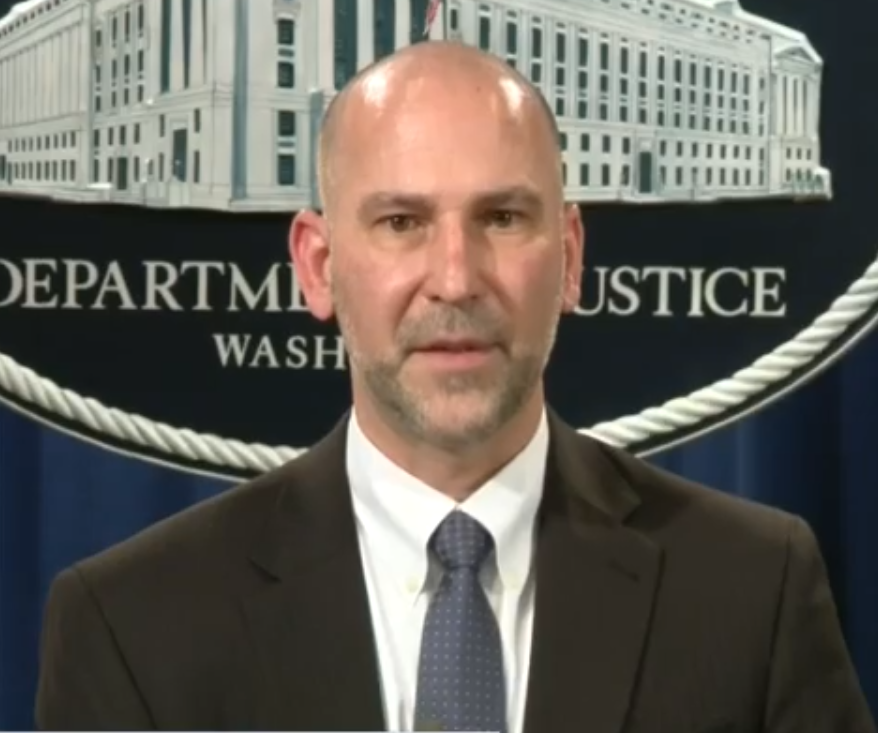
Steven M. D'Antuono, FBI Washington Field Office Assistant Director in Charge, at a DOJ press briefing on January 12, 2021, regarding the January 6th Capitol attack investigation.

Steven Michael D'Antuono is a former American law enforcement official who served as Assistant Director in Charge of the FBI Washington Field Office from October 2020 until his retirement in December 2022. He previously served as Special Agent in Charge of the Detroit Field Office, whose agents arrested the suspects in the Gretchen Whitmer kidnapping plot.

As head of the Washington Field Office, D'Antuono oversaw the FBI's response to the January 6 United States Capitol attack and the search of Mar-a-Lago in August 2022.

== Early career ==
D'Antuono earned a bachelor's degree in accounting from the University of Rhode Island and worked as a certified public accountant before joining the FBI in January 1996 as a forensic accountant assigned to the Providence Resident Agency under the Boston Field Office. He supported criminal investigations into financial crimes, public corruption, organized crime, and counterintelligence.

D'Antuono became a special agent in July 1998 and was assigned to the Washington Field Office after graduating from the FBI Academy in Quantico, Virginia, where he investigated white-collar crime and public corruption. He held several positions within the FBI, including supervisory special agent at the FBI Academy (2004–2008), where he taught white-collar crime courses, and assistant special agent in charge at the St. Louis Field Office (2014–2017), where he oversaw the Criminal and Administrative branches. In 2017, he was promoted to chief of the Financial Crimes Section of the Criminal Investigative Division, overseeing all FBI white-collar crime programs including corporate fraud, money laundering, health care fraud, and intellectual property crimes.

== Detroit Field Office ==
In July 2019, D'Antuono was named Special Agent in Charge of the FBI Detroit Field Office. During his tenure, the office pursued investigations into corruption at the United Auto Workers leadership, public officials in Troy, and pharmacy fraud in Dearborn. D'Antuono emphasized community engagement, meeting with religious leaders and hiring a community outreach specialist for the field office.

In October 2020, the FBI announced the arrests of 13 men in the Gretchen Whitmer kidnapping plot, an alleged conspiracy to kidnap Michigan Governor Gretchen Whitmer. Days later, FBI Director Christopher Wray announced D'Antuono's promotion to lead the Washington Field Office.

The Whitmer case drew controversy over the FBI's use of informants. Defense attorneys argued that undercover agents and informants had entrapped the defendants. Two defendants were acquitted in April 2022; two others were convicted after a retrial. D'Antuono addressed the entrapment allegations in testimony before the House Judiciary Committee in June 2023.

== Washington Field Office ==
D'Antuono was appointed Assistant Director in Charge of the Washington Field Office in October 2020.

Following the January 6 Capitol attack, he served as a public spokesman for the FBI's investigation, appearing at multiple press conferences.

On January 8, 2021, D'Antuono told reporters there was no evidence that Antifa members had participated in storming the Capitol. Four days later, he announced that the FBI expected to arrest hundreds of people as it sorted through evidence submitted by the public, with charges of sedition and conspiracy expected to be common.

D'Antuono led the FBI Washington Field Office during the period when the office conducted the Arctic Frost investigation, an FBI investigation opened in April 2022 into efforts to overturn the 2020 presidential election.

In August 2022, the Washington Field Office executed a search warrant at former President Donald Trump's Mar-a-Lago residence as part of an investigation into the handling of classified documents. In an on-the-record interview with NBC News, D'Antuono said he had advocated for seeking consent before obtaining a warrant and expressed concern that the search would "further erode public faith in the FBI." He stated, "I was worried about it increasing distrust in us," and described internal disagreements between FBI personnel and Department of Justice prosecutors.

During an August 2022 Senate Judiciary Committee oversight hearing, Senator Ted Cruz questioned FBI Director Christopher Wray about D'Antuono's promotion from Detroit to Washington. Wray confirmed that D'Antuono "was the special agent in charge of the Detroit field office and is now the assistant director in charge of the Washington field office."

== Congressional testimony ==
D'Antuono testified before the House Judiciary Committee in June 2023 regarding the January 6 investigation and the Mar-a-Lago search. According to a House Judiciary Committee letter summarizing his testimony, D'Antuono questioned why the Miami Field Office was not assigned to execute the Mar-a-Lago warrant given its location, and stated he "never got a good answer" for why no U.S. Attorney was assigned to the matter. The Washington Times reported that, in the same testimony, D'Antuono confirmed that the Washington Field Office learned after the January 6 riot that FBI confidential human sources from other field offices had been present at the Capitol, and that additional informants participated on their own accord. A December 2024 DOJ Inspector General report later confirmed that 26 FBI confidential human sources were present in Washington on January 6, with 23 attending on their own initiative rather than at FBI direction.

D'Antuono also testified about the FBI's investigation into pipe bombs placed near the Democratic National Committee and Republican National Committee headquarters on January 5, 2021. He stated that the devices "could have exploded" and "could have done serious physical injury or death." In December 2025, the FBI arrested a suspect using evidence collected by D'Antuono's team during his tenure.

== Retirement ==
D'Antuono retired from the FBI in December 2022.

== See also ==
- Gretchen Whitmer kidnapping plot
- Timothy Thibault
- Jay I. Bratt
