= Presidential call button =

White House call button used by presidents of the United States

Coordinates: 38.8974°N 77.0374°W

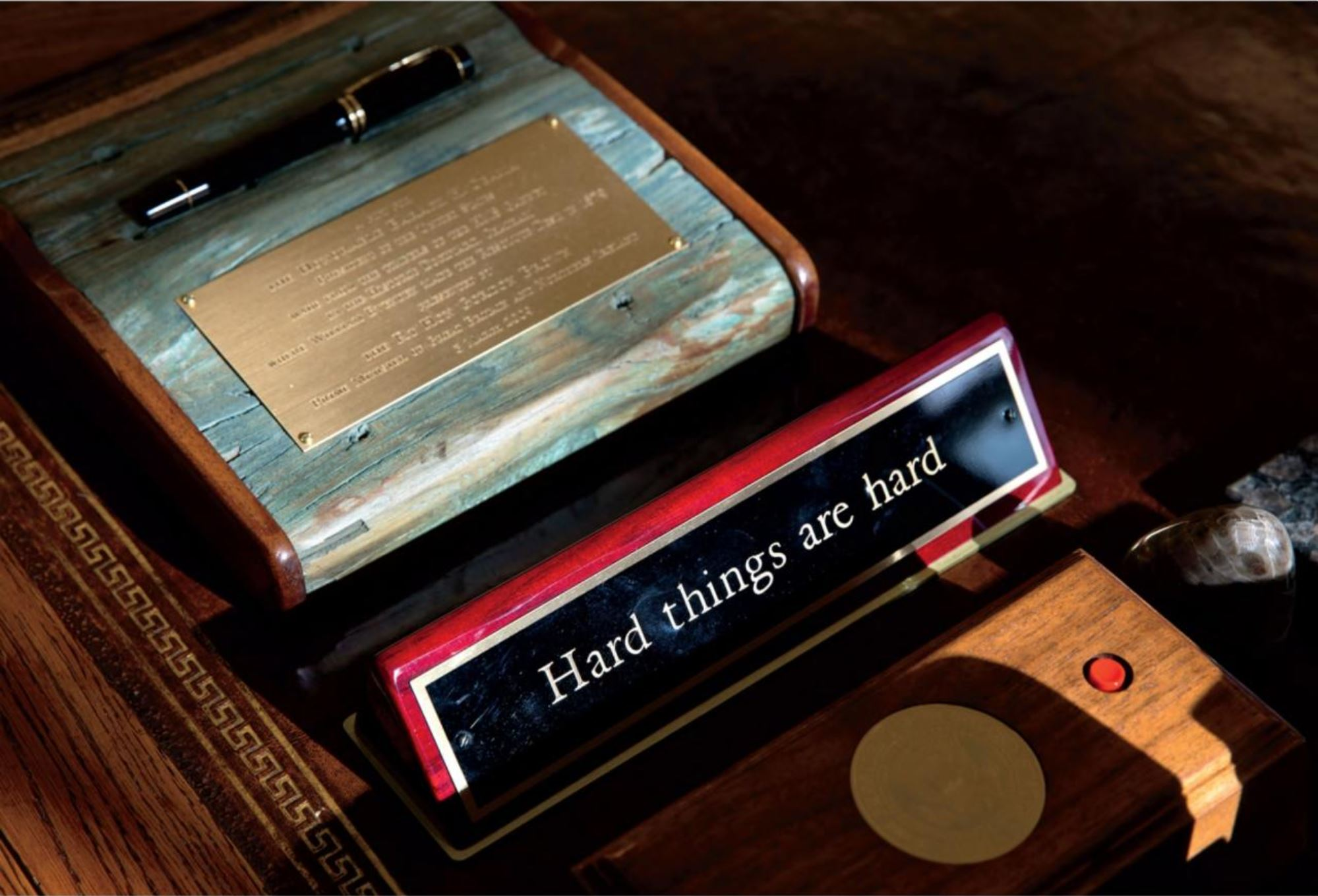
The Presidential call button on the Resolute desk alongside the HMS Gannet pen holder, a "Hard things are hard" plaque given to President Obama by David Axelrod, and a Petoskey stone given to Obama by Pete Souza's wife for his 50th birthday

An approximately 9-by-3-inch (20 by 8 cm) wooden box housing a call button is present on the Oval Office desk in the Oval Office of the White House. This call button, also referred to as a valet button, is used to call aides to the President for various reasons. The modern version of the call button has been present since at least the George W. Bush presidency. Earlier versions of presidential call bells and buzzers have existed since the early 1800s.

== History ==
=== Past call buttons and buzzers ===
External image
- The Working White House: Electric Call-button Box A c.1930 White House electric call button

Before the mid-1800s, a series of call bells was installed in the White House and used as a form of staff communication. This system was followed by a battery operated device, used by the President, that could be used to call on staff. The White House was wired for electricity in 1891 allowing for simple wired call-buttons.

An 1881 letter written by White House disbursing agent William H. Crook refers to an electric bell attached to president James Garfield's desk.

Betty C. Monkman notes in The White House: Its Historic Furnishings & First Families that the Treaty table, also known as the Grant Cabinet table, has the remains of a call button system still attached to it, but does not state when this system was used.

In the 1889 Publication Historic Homes in Washington; its noted men and women by Mary S. Lockwood a story is told about Benjamin Harrison's grandson pushing a call button on the President's desk. She wrote:

Did not little Benjamin, when alone one day in his grandfather's office, climb to his table, and by a touch here and there with his baby hand, set the whole force of secretaries, clerks and messengers on a chase to do his majesty's bidding?

Lyndon Johnson had a series of buttons, or keys, to summon different drinks to the Oval Office, Cabinet Room, and "Little Lounge" (a room just next to the Oval Office). In the Oval Office the keys were on the table behind the president's desk. The four keys were for coffee, tea, Coca-Cola and Fresca; when pressed, a butler would fulfill the president's drink request.

During Johnson's presidency he was known for having extramarital affairs, with what Robert Dallek in his book Lone Star Rising: Lyndon Johnson and His Times called a harem of women. Ronald Kessler in his book Inside the Whitehouse describes multiple sexual encounters between Johnson and his secretaries in the Oval Office including one where his wife, Ladybird Johnson, walked in on Johnson and a secretary in the midst of having sex, leading to the installation of a buzzer system to warn him if Ladybird was on her way.

Several presidents had buttons or switches installed in their desk in the Oval Office to start recording devices attached to microphones in the room. This includes Dwight Eisenhower, John F. Kennedy and Richard Nixon.

=== Modern call button ===
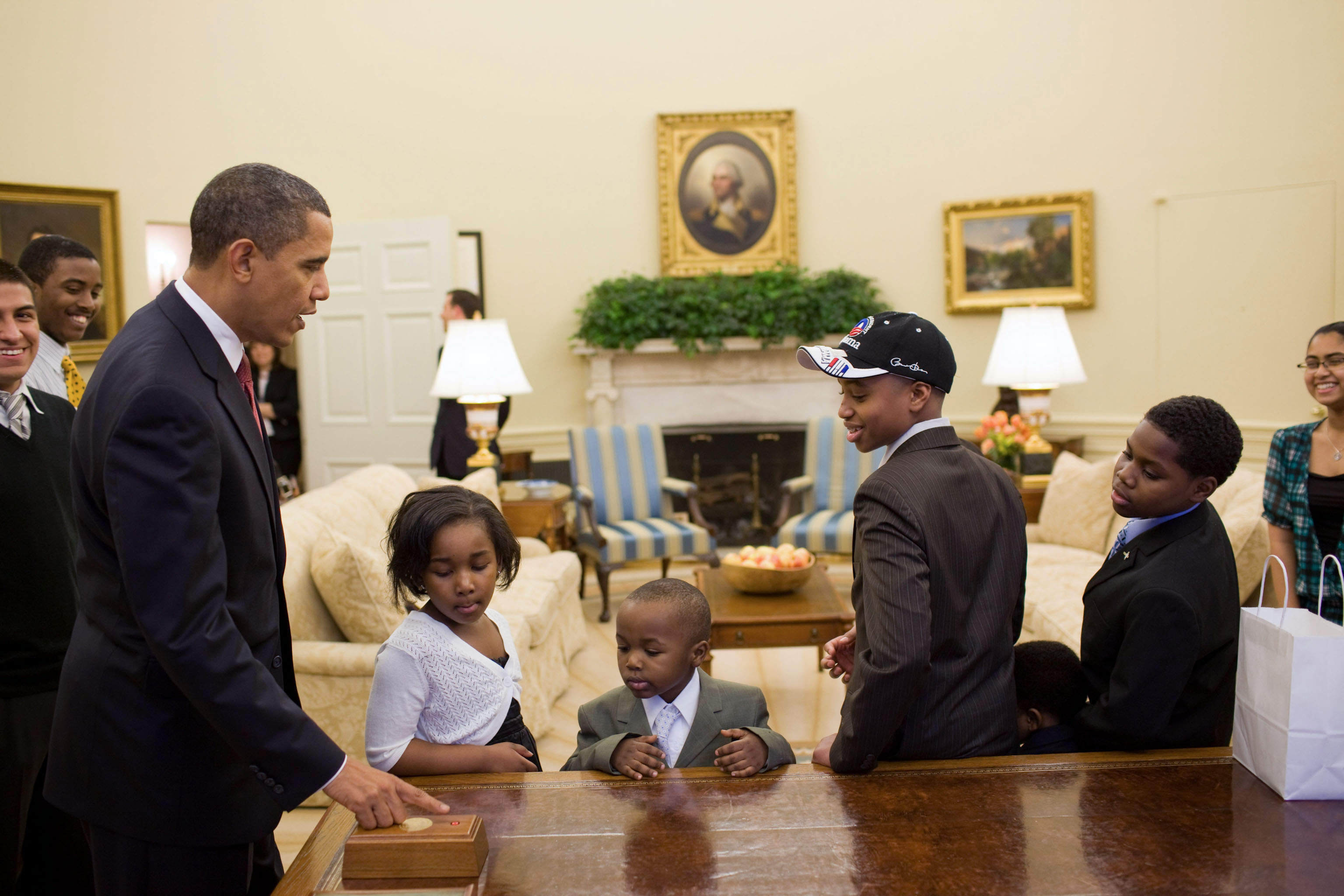
Barack Obama pointing out the call button to Washington, D.C. area students

The modern call button sits in an approximately 9 by 3 in (20 by 8 cm) wooden box marked with a golden presidential seal and has been on the Resolute desk since at least the George W. Bush presidency. According to Richard Branson, President Obama repurposed it to order tea for his White House guests.

During Donald Trump's presidencies, when the button was pressed, a signal summoned a valet who brought a Diet Coke on a silver platter. At one time in Trump's first term, Walt Nauta had this job. In his first term, Trump reportedly also used the button to request lunch, and to prank visitors into worrying that it was the nuclear button. Trump would suddenly press the button, his guests would be unsure how to react, and when a Diet Coke was brought in Trump would laugh. He said in an interview that people "get a little nervous when I press that button." Trump further conflated this button with the nuclear button with a tweet in January 2018:

Donald J. Trump
(@realDonaldTrump)
tweeted:

North Korean Leader Kim Jong Un just stated that the “Nuclear Button is on his desk at all times.” Will someone from his depleted and food starved regime please inform him that I too have a Nuclear Button, but it is a much bigger & more powerful one than his, and my Button works!

January 2, 2018

Rachel Plotnick notes in her book Power Button that the "sexual one-upmanship" in this tweet was quickly undercut by news outlets noting the only button on Trump's desk "summons the White House steward with a Coca-Cola (really)."

In the first few days of Joe Biden's presidency, it was reported that he had the button removed; however, it appeared to return a few weeks later when a White House official told Politico that the button was back on the desk with an unspecified purpose. James Corden has said that Joe Biden had an "ice cream button" on his desk. The button reportedly remained for the rest of Biden's term. Following Trump's second inauguration, The Wall Street Journal reported that the button was repurposed to again order Diet Coke.

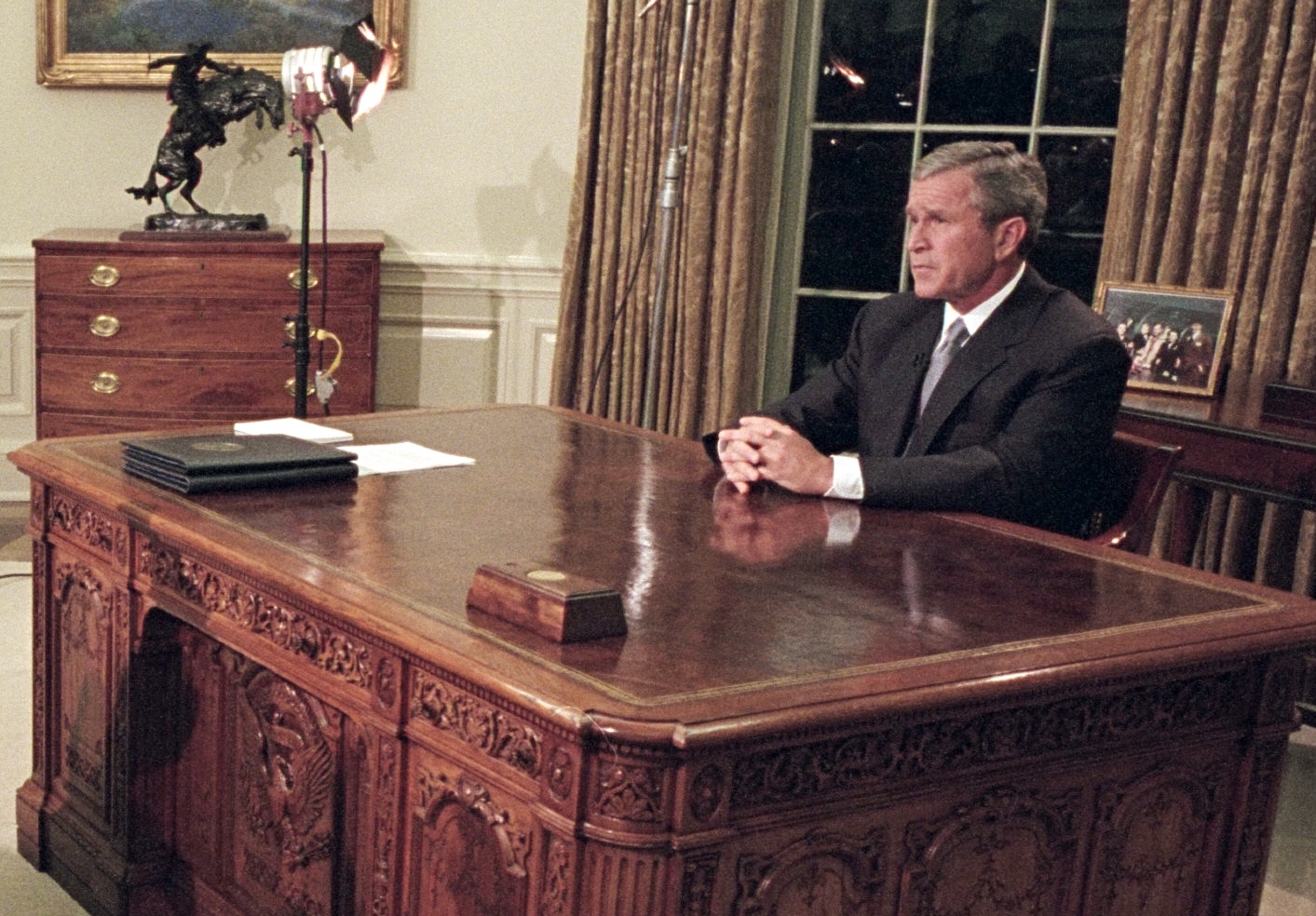
George W. Bush at the Resolute desk during 9/11, with the call button on the desk, to his left

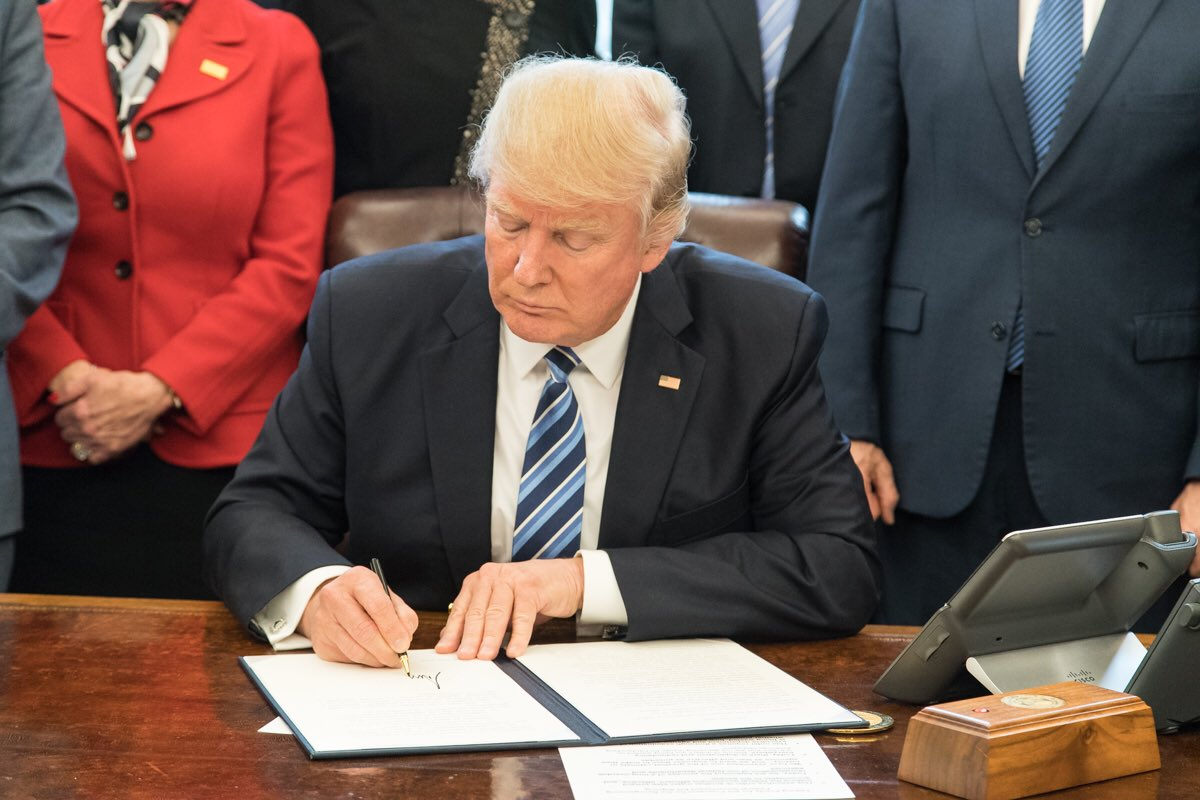
The call button in a wooden box next to Donald Trump's telephone on the Resolute desk in March 2017

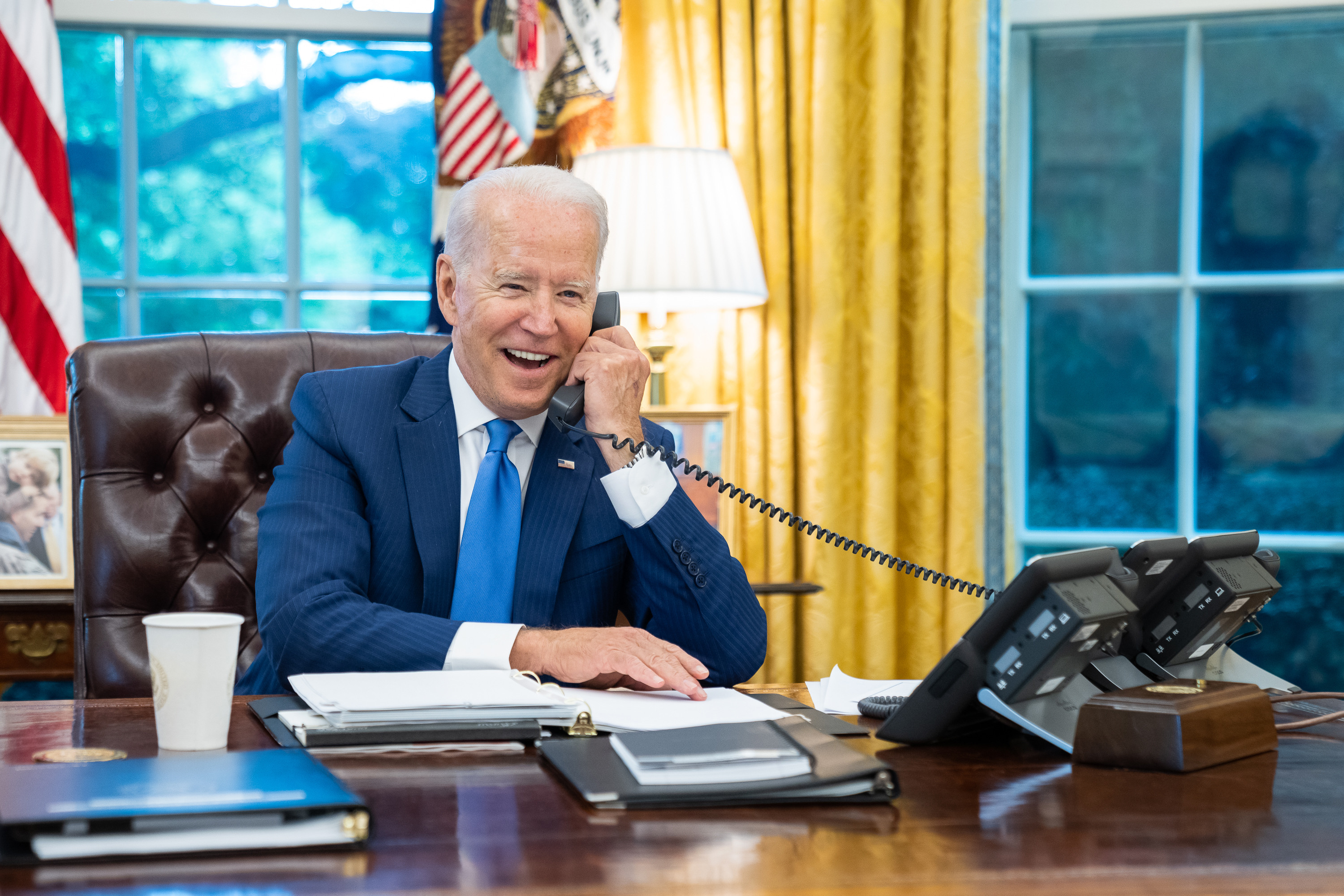
The button on the desk, during early months of Joe Biden's presidency, in 2021

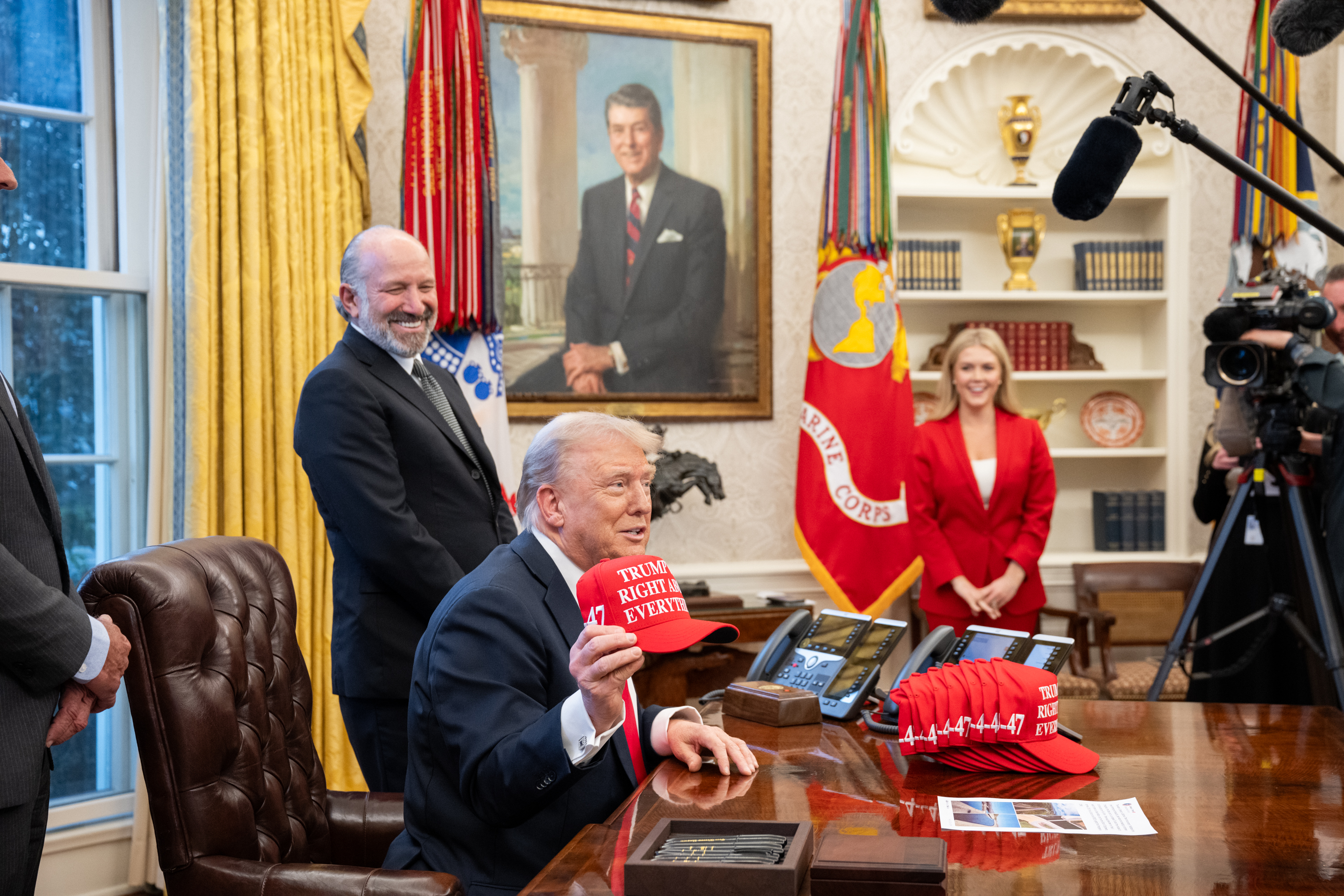
Button visible during Trump's 2nd presidency on 25 February 2025
