= FBI Agents Association =

Professional association for FBI agents

- Abbreviation: FBIAA
- Formation: September 18, 1981; 45 years ago
- Founded at: Washington, D.C.
- Type: Professional association
- Legal status: 501(c)(6)
- Purpose: Advocacy for FBI special agents
- Headquarters: Washington, D.C.
- Region served: United States
- Services: Legal representation, legislative advocacy, charitable funds
- Members: 14,000+ (2025)
- President: Natalie Bara
- Main organ: National Executive Board
- Website: fbiaa.org

The Federal Bureau of Investigation Agents Association (FBIAA) is a professional association representing active and former special agents of the Federal Bureau of Investigation (FBI). Founded in 1981 and headquartered in Washington, D.C., the organization represents more than 14,000 members, including over 90 percent of active FBI special agents.

The FBIAA provides legal representation, legislative advocacy, and financial support to its members through charitable funds. It is the only organization specifically dedicated to serving active FBI special agents, distinct from the Society of Former Special Agents of the Federal Bureau of Investigation, which represents retired agents. The association has chapters in each of the FBI's 56 field offices, as well as at FBI Headquarters and the FBI Academy in Quantico, Virginia.

In 2025, the FBIAA received national attention for its criticism of FBI director Kash Patel's dismissal of agents who had worked on investigations involving President Donald Trump, including the Arctic Frost investigation.

== History ==
The FBIAA was founded in 1981 in response to events surrounding FBI investigations of the Weather Underground in the 1970s. During that period, FBI agents were directed to use "sensitive techniques" including warrantless entries and wiretaps to locate fugitives. When these methods came under scrutiny from Congress and the Department of Justice in the political climate following the Watergate scandal, several agents faced potential prosecution for actions they had taken under orders from FBI leadership.

Agents formed an ad hoc group called the Special Agents Legal Defense Committee to raise funds and organize support for colleagues facing legal jeopardy. The committee's success in uniting agents led to a desire for a permanent organization to address agents' concerns on a continuing basis. The FBI Agents Association was incorporated under the laws of the District of Columbia as a nonprofit corporation on September 18, 1981.

== Organization ==
The FBIAA is governed by a National Executive Board consisting of seven volunteers who are active special agents. Board members are elected to two-year terms by chapter representatives at the association's biennial national convention. Each FBI field office and FBI Headquarters is represented by a chapter representative elected by that chapter's members.

The association operates two 501(c)(3) charitable funds: the FBIAA Memorial College Fund, which provides scholarships to children of agents killed in the line of duty, and the FBIAA Membership Assistance Fund, which offers financial support to agents and their families facing hardship. The organization also administers the SA Jeffrey Drubner Legacy Fund, which supports families of agents killed in service.

The FBIAA hosts an annual G-Man Honors fundraising event. In 2025, the event raised $1.4 million for the association's charitable funds.

== Advocacy ==
The FBIAA engages in legislative advocacy on issues affecting FBI agents, including pay, benefits, and working conditions. The association has advocated for sick leave provisions, locality pay, and relocation bonuses for agents. It also works to prevent budget cuts that could affect agents' compensation or investigative capabilities.

The association provides legal representation to members facing employment actions and advocates internally within the FBI on behalf of agents. FBIAA representatives have testified before Congress on matters affecting FBI personnel and operations.

The association engages in legislative advocacy on issues affecting FBI agents, including compensation, benefits, funding, and due process protections.

During the 2018–2019 government shutdown, then-president Thomas O'Connor released "Voices from the Field," a 72-page report compiling anonymous accounts from agents describing the shutdown's impact on investigations and personal finances. The report warned that the inability to pay confidential sources was causing the FBI to lose informants in counterterrorism and drug investigations. The association was credited by members of Congress and national media with helping end the shutdown.

In August 2022, following the search of Mar-a-Lago and amid increased threats against FBI personnel, then-president Brian O'Hare issued statements condemning threats against law enforcement and calling on political leaders to "unequivocally" denounce violence against agents. In a September 2022 statement responding to reports that some agents had lost confidence in FBI director Christopher A. Wray, O'Hare pushed back, stating that "attempts to politicize FBI Agents' work and divide our team should be rejected" and expressing confidence in Wray's leadership.

The association has consistently opposed clemency for Leonard Peltier, who was convicted of murdering FBI special agents Jack Coler and Ronald Williams in 1975. When President Joe Biden commuted Peltier's sentence on January 20, 2025, president Natalie Bara called it a "last-second, disgraceful act" and "a cruel betrayal to the families and colleagues of these fallen Agents."

In February 2025, the association warned that nearly 1,000 FBI Special Agents on probationary status faced potential termination under a federal workforce directive, calling for exemptions for national security and public safety positions.

Prior to the announcement of Dan Bongino as FBI deputy director, the association stated that FBI director Kash Patel had agreed during a January meeting that the deputy director "should continue to be an on-board, active Special Agent as has been the case for 117 years." Bongino, a former Secret Service agent who had never worked at the FBI, became the first non-FBI agent to serve as deputy director in the bureau's history.

== 2025 personnel actions controversy ==
Following the confirmation of Kash Patel as FBI director in 2025, the FBI undertook a series of personnel actions against agents and officials who had worked on investigations involving President Donald Trump, including the Arctic Frost investigation and cases brought by Special Counsel Jack Smith.

In August 2025, the FBIAA wrote to Republican and Democratic leaders of the House and Senate Judiciary committees warning that Patel was "making personnel decisions without providing the due process protections promised to the recently terminated law enforcement officers under federal law." Association president Natalie Bara noted that Patel had testified during his confirmation hearings that he would "honor the internal review process of the FBI" in employment matters, but argued that subsequent terminations were "wholly inconsistent with that commitment."

In November 2025, after the FBI fired, reinstated, and then re-fired several agents who had worked on the Arctic Frost investigation within a 24-hour period, the FBIAA issued a statement accusing Patel of having "disregarded the law and launched a campaign of erratic and arbitrary retribution." The association stated that "an Agent simply being assigned to an investigation and conducting it appropriately within the law should never be grounds for termination."

The FBIAA also expressed concern that agents' names were being released publicly by the Senate Judiciary Committee and subsequently targeted by pro-Trump social media accounts, stating that "FBI agents must be free to focus on protecting the American people, not fear losing their jobs over third-party social media posts."

== See also ==
- Society of Former Special Agents of the Federal Bureau of Investigation
- Federal Law Enforcement Officers Association
- Arctic Frost investigation
- Kash Patel
