= Simpatico Software Systems =

American data mining company

- Type: Private
- Industry: Data mining, software services, consulting
- Founded: 2001
- Founder: Ken Block
- Services: Fraud tracking, data mining, engineering and consulting services, SNAP software services

Simpatico Software Systems is an American data mining company founded in 2001 by Ken Block that is used by government agencies and private businesses to track waste and fraud. Additionally, it supplies software services to the SNAP program. Simpatico Systems has also provided engineering and consulting services.

Its clients have included the EVERTEC and GTECH Corporations, Northrop Grumman, and the state government of Texas. In Texas, Simpatico developed a statewide debit card system for food stamp and welfare recipients that saved the state more than $1 billion.

== Election investigation ==
In 2020, Block was hired by the Donald Trump campaign to investigate claims of fraud in the 2020 U.S. presidential election. The Washington Post reported that Simpatico was paid around $750,000 to conduct the investigation.

After investigating, Simpatico found no evidence of electoral fraud. According to Block, the theories advanced by the Trump campaign were "all false".

In 2023, Simpatico was the subject of a subpoena brought by Jack Smith, a special counsel appointed as part of an investigation by the federal government into multiple claims against Trump. Block has stated that he has spoken to investigators.
