= Oval Office Operations =

Manages schedule of US President

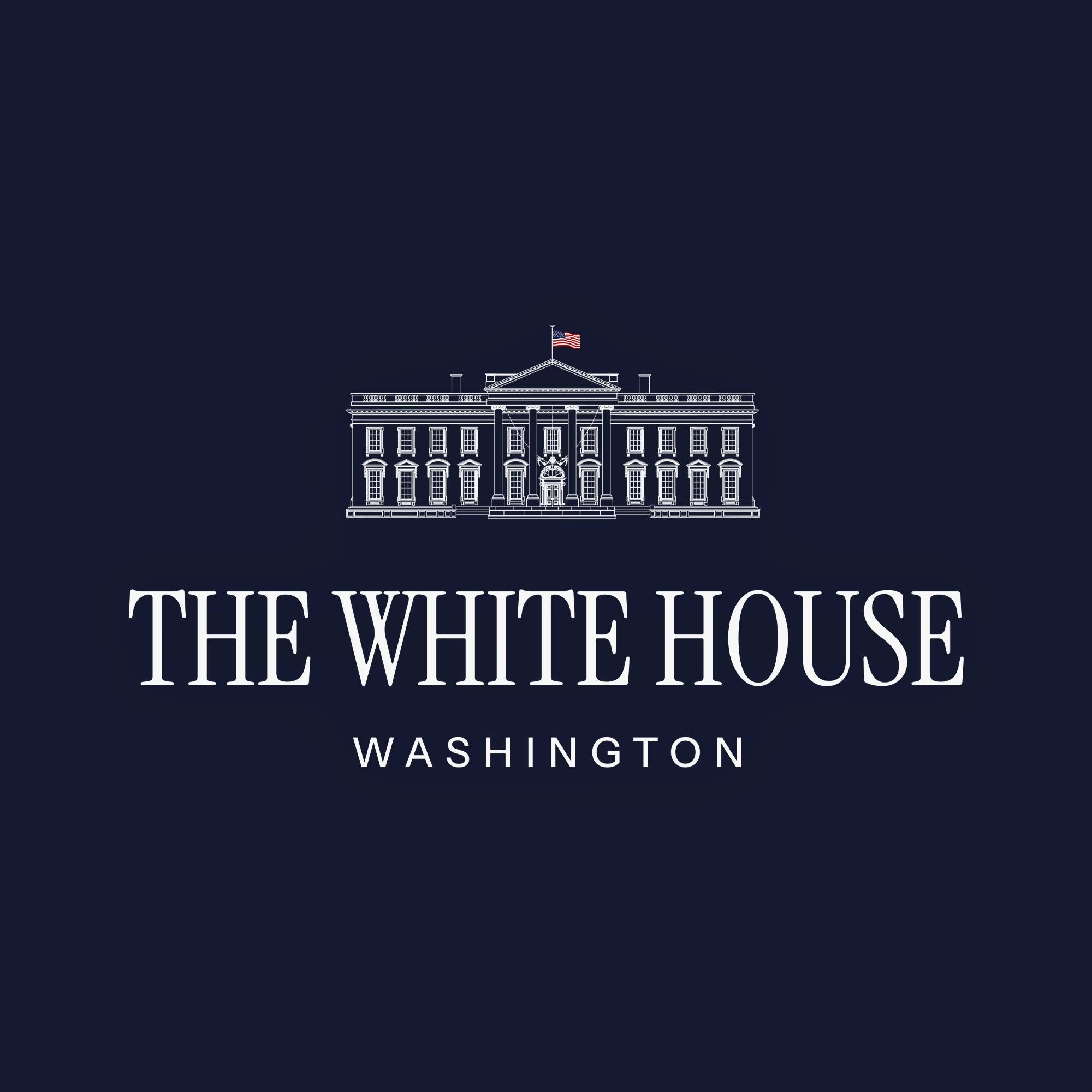

Agency overview
- Headquarters: West Wing, White House Washington, D.C., U.S.
- Agency executive: Walt Nauta, Director
- Parent department: White House Office

Immediately outside the Oval Office, Oval Office Operations staff manage the president's personal schedule, private engagements and immediate access to meet with the president of the United States. Though it varies from administration to administration—and within each term—Oval Office Operations typically consists of a director of Oval Office operations, a personal secretary to the president, and a personal aide to the president (body man).

== Current personnel ==
- Director of Oval Office Operations: Walt Nauta
- Deputy Director of Oval Office Operations: Chamberlain Harris
- Executive Assistant to the President: Natalie Harp
- Personal Aide to the President: Christopher Ambrosini

== See also ==
- White House Office
