= Arctic Frost investigation =

2022 FBI investigation

The Arctic Frost investigation, widely reported as the fake-elector investigation at the time, was a joint federal investigation opened in April 2022 involving the FBI, DOJ Office of Inspector General, U.S. Postal Inspection Service, National Archives and Office of Inspector General into Donald Trump's efforts to overturn the 2020 United States presidential election results. The investigation was transferred to Special Counsel Jack Smith's oversight in November 2022, along with other investigations into the election and its aftermath, leading to the federal prosecution of Donald Trump for election obstruction.

After Democratic nominee Joe Biden won the 2020 United States presidential election, Republican nominee and then-incumbent president Donald Trump pursued an effort to overturn the election, (Note: Attributed to multiple references:) with support from his campaign, proxies, political allies, and many of his supporters. These efforts culminated in the January 6 Capitol attack.

After the results of the election determined Trump had lost, he, his associates, and Republican Party officials in seven battleground states – Arizona, Georgia, Michigan, Nevada, New Mexico, Pennsylvania, and Wisconsin – devised a fake electors scheme to submit fraudulent certificates of ascertainment to falsely claim Trump had won the Electoral College vote in crucial states.

Under US attorney general Merrick Garland, the DOJ opened multiple investigations into events during the closing weeks of the Trump presidency, including one opened in early 2022 on the fake electors plot.

In November 2022, Garland appointed Jack Smith as an independent special counsel responsible for overseeing criminal investigations including the fake electors scheme. Trump was indicted in August 2023 on charges of conspiring to overturn the results, but the case was dismissed after Trump's 2024 election win and a Justice Department legal opinion that sitting presidents cannot face federal prosecution.

== Investigation ==
According to a draft FBI internal document later published by Senator Chuck Grassley (the Republican chair of the Senate Judiciary Committee), the FBI characterized Arctic Frost as an investigation into what it described as a "multifaceted conspiracy to overturn the results of the 2020 Presidential Election so that former president Trump could remain in office". The document said it involved subjects from the private sector in numerous battleground states (Pennsylvania, Michigan, Georgia, Wisconsin, New Mexico, and Arizona), the Department of Justice (DOJ), and the White House. According to this same document, Arctic Frost was a joint investigation between the FBI, DOJ Office of Inspector General (OIG), U.S. Postal Inspection Service, and National Archives and Records Administration (OIG).

The investigation was opened in April 2022 by Timothy Thibault, then-assistant special agent in charge at the FBI's Washington Field Office. The FBI's opening document alleged "specific and articulable facts" indicating that individuals had engaged in activity violating federal law. According to FBI documents, this was approved by leaders at the FBI's Washington Field Office, the FBI General Counsel, and FBI deputy director Paul Abbate.

The FBI documents also appear to indicate that, because of the sensitivity of the investigation, the case opening was also approved by FBI director Christopher Wray, Deputy Attorney General Lisa Monaco and Attorney General Merrick Garland, pursuant to FBI and DOJ policy. According to conservative lawyer Andrew McCarthy, the opening of the investigation was entirely appropriate.

According to Grassley, whistleblower disclosures identified Special Agent Walter Giardina as the author of the investigation's targeting list and a point of contact on numerous subpoenas. Giardina was terminated by FBI director Kash Patel on August 8, 2025.

The investigation was transferred to Special Counsel Jack Smith in November 2022. Initially disclosed records showed Smith and the FBI used grand jury subpoenas to obtain phone records (but not call contents) from nine Republican politicians in 2023, covering four days surrounding the January 6 Capitol riot. The politicians were eight senators (Lindsey Graham, Bill Hagerty, Josh Hawley, Dan Sullivan, Tommy Tuberville, Ron Johnson, Cynthia Lummis, and Marsha Blackburn) and Representative Mike Kelly. The investigation obtained phone toll records rather than wiretap content (see below).

According to Grassley and his colleague Ron Johnson, 200 pages of documents obtained by a whistleblower, released by the Senate Judiciary Committee on October 29, 2025, showed that Arctic Frost issued 197 subpoenas seeking records related to approximately 430 Republican individuals and entities. These filings also showed that the FBI obtained evidence that individuals tried to persuade former vice president Mike Pence to support the false elector certificates. According to Grassley, the operation's 197 subpoenas were classified as "Prohibited Access" and included nondisclosure orders preventing recipients from notifying the targets, with some gag orders lasting "at least one year".

Representative Jamie Raskin, the ranking Democrat on the House Judiciary Committee, stated that "phone-record subpoenas and non-disclosure orders are routine in grand jury investigations at the state and federal level". The phone records analysis was characterized in FBI documents as "preliminary toll analysis".

In November 2025, responding to the Judiciary Committee investigation, Verizon told House Judiciary Committee Chairman Jim Jordan that his phone records were subpoenaed for a 28-month period from January 2020 through April 2022. The FBI also physically seized the cell phone of Representative Scott Perry on August 9, 2022. According to Grassley, the FBI also obtained President Donald Trump's and Vice President Mike Pence's government-issued cell phones, with Biden White House assistance in facilitating the transfer.

According to documents Grassley described as whistleblower disclosures, released in September 2025, 92 Republican organizations and individuals were placed under the investigative scope of Arctic Frost, including Turning Point USA, the Republican National Committee, the Republican Attorneys General Association, the Conservative Partnership Institute, and the America First Policy Institute.

According to documents released by the House Judiciary Committee in October 2025, 45 individuals were identified as potential subjects of the investigation, including Steve Bannon, Rudy Giuliani, Jeffrey Clark, John Eastman, and Mark Meadows. An additional 111 individuals—including Peter Navarro, Dan Scavino, and Ed Martin—were named in investigative documents but not formally designated as subjects.

According to documents released by Grassley the same week, the subpoenas also sought communications with media companies including CBS, Fox News, Newsmax, and Sinclair; communications with members and staff of Congress; correspondence with White House advisors; donor data and fundraising analytics; and comprehensive banking records.

=== Telecommunications carriers ===
Major telecommunications carriers responded differently to the subpoenas. AT&T refused to comply after questioning the legal basis for requesting records of members of Congress. In a letter to Senator Grassley, AT&T General Counsel David Chorzempa stated: "When AT&T raised questions with Special Counsel Smith's office concerning the legal basis for seeking records of members of Congress, the Special Counsel did not pursue the subpoena further, and no records were produced."

Verizon complied with all subpoenas, producing phone records for 12 phone numbers associated with Republican lawmakers spanning January 4–7, 2021. The company justified its compliance by stating the subpoenas were "facially valid" and that federal law required compliance. A Verizon spokesperson told Reuters: "We received a valid subpoena and a court order to keep it confidential. We weren't told why the information was requested or what the investigation was about."

According to The Washington Times, following the revelations, Verizon announced policy changes requiring escalation to senior leadership before complying with subpoenas involving members of Congress. Rich Young, Verizon's associate vice president of corporate communications, stated the company is "committed to restoring trust through transparency and will continue to work with Congress and the administration as they examine these issues and consider reforms to expand notification protections."

=== Toll records vs. wiretapping ===
Senator Josh Hawley stated that the FBI "tapped my phone" and those of other senators. However, the investigation obtained phone toll records (metadata showing call times, durations and numbers) rather than wiretapping (intercepting call content). Legal experts including Fordham University clinical associate law professor Cheryl Bader clarified: "The process 'was not a wiretap'. What was sought was basically a record of phone numbers dialed from a specific phone number." Law enforcement agencies routinely obtain toll records through subpoenas and court orders to establish communication patterns and timelines in criminal and national security investigations.

Intelligence and privacy experts have cautioned that metadata analysis can reveal substantial information about individuals. Stewart Baker, former NSA General Counsel, stated: "Metadata absolutely tells you everything about somebody's life. If you have enough metadata you don't really need content." A 2016 peer-reviewed Stanford University study published in the Proceedings of the National Academy of Sciences found that telephone metadata "is densely interconnected, can trivially be reidentified, enables automated location and relationship inferences, and can be used to determine highly sensitive traits."

== Public disclosure and aftermath ==
The investigation was initially publicly known as a probe into a "false electors scheme" when Special Counsel Jack Smith was appointed in November 2022, with the "Arctic Frost" codename and broader scope remaining undisclosed. Information about specific evidence sought and obtained by investigators emerged through documents released by Senator Chuck Grassley beginning in 2025.

=== Legislative ===
On October 10, senators Tommy Tuberville, (Note: Targeted by investigation) Chuck Grassley and Ron Johnson wrote a letter to Patel and Attorney General Pam Bondi demanding the release of all documents "in unredacted form" referring to the call logs of Members of Congress during the investigation of 4–7 January 2021. The letter was also signed by:

- Marsha Blackburn (R-TN)
- Katie Britt (R-AL)
- John Cornyn (R-TX)
- Ted Cruz (R-TX)
- Lindsey Graham (R-SC)
- Bill Hagerty (R-TN)
- Josh Hawley (R-MO)
- Mike Kelly (R-PA)
- John Kennedy (R-LA)
- Mike Lee (R-UT)
- Cynthia Lummis (R-WY)
- Ashley Moody (R-FL)
- Dan Sullivan (R-AK)
- Thom Tillis (R-NC)
- Eric Schmitt (R-MO)

On 15 October, House Judiciary Committee Chairman Jim Jordan requested Smith testify to his committee.

Senate Judiciary Committee Democrats, led by Ranking Member Dick Durbin, called for former Special Counsel Jack Smith to testify publicly before the committee about the Arctic Frost investigation. In an October 30, 2025 letter to Chairman Grassley, Durbin and all Senate Judiciary Democrats urged Grassley to invite Smith to testify and requested that the Department of Justice release Volume II of the unredacted "Final Report of the Special Counsel's Investigations and Prosecutions," which was submitted to then-Attorney General Merrick Garland in January 2025. Smith had previously offered in October 2025 to appear publicly before the committee to address what he characterized as "the many mischaracterizations" of his investigations. Chairman Grassley responded that "hearings should follow once the investigative foundation has been firmly set," stating he was working with DOJ and FBI to collect relevant records.

By November 1, Grassley's Senate Judiciary Committee had released over 1,700 pages of documents obtained through legally protected whistleblowers. Grassley did not redact the names of FBI or Justice Department employees, stating that "public servants have no right to hide what they have done" from taxpayers; some employees were subsequently harassed on social media after their names were made public.

On December 3, 2025, House Judiciary Committee Chairman Jim Jordan subpoenaed former Special Counsel Jack Smith to appear for a closed-door deposition on December 17, 2025, with documents due by December 12. Smith's attorney stated that Smith had offered to testify publicly six weeks earlier but would comply with the subpoena. Representative Jamie Raskin criticized the closed-door format, stating Republicans wanted to "spin, distort, and cherry-pick" Smith's remarks. President Trump stated he would prefer Smith testify publicly, saying "I'd rather see him testify publicly, because there's no way he can answer the questions."

On December 17, 2025, Smith appeared before the House Judiciary Committee for closed-door testimony. The committee released the full 255-page transcript and video on December 31. Smith testified that the decision to charge Trump was his alone and denied any political motivation, stating he never spoke to then-President Biden about the investigations. The Department of Justice barred Smith from discussing the classified documents case due to Judge Cannon's ongoing restrictions. Smith testified publicly on January 22, 2026.

==== Federal funding bill ====
The Arctic Frost disclosures occurred during the October 2025 federal government shutdown, and played a part in the funding package lawmakers voted on to end the shutdown. Senate Majority Leader John Thune secured a provision to award hundreds of thousands of dollars to senators subpoenaed in Smith's investigation. The provision allowed senators to sue the DOJ for damages, with a minimum of $500,000 per violation, and applied retroactively to 2022. The bill also required the DOJ and FBI to notify the Senate when a lawmaker is under investigation. However, of the eight known Senate Republicans whose phone records were subpoenaed, only one, Lindsey Graham, said he would use the provision, with others, such as Josh Hawley, distancing themselves.

House of Representatives Speaker Mike Johnson promised to hold a vote for a bill that would repeal the provision. On November 19, 2025, the House voted 426–0 to repeal the provision, with both Republicans and Democrats criticizing it as self-serving. Senate Democrats, led by Senators Martin Heinrich and Mark Kelly, introduced the "Anti-Cash Grab Act" to repeal the provision.

On November 20, Heinrich requested unanimous consent to pass the House repeal bill, but was blocked by Graham, who stated he intended to sue the DOJ, Jack Smith, and Verizon for "a hell of a lot more than $500,000". Thune then proposed an alternative resolution requiring any damages won by senators to be forfeited to the U.S. Treasury, but this was blocked by Heinrich.

==== Defense authorization bill ====
Separately, Representative Elise Stefanik (R-NY) authored a provision for the National Defense Authorization Act requiring the FBI to notify Congress when opening counterintelligence investigations into presidential or federal candidates. In early December, Stefanik publicly accused Speaker Johnson of blocking the provision at the behest of Representative Jamie Raskin (D-MD), citing Crossfire Hurricane and Arctic Frost as examples of "illegal weaponization". Johnson denied the accusations, stating the issue "wasn't even on my radar"; Stefanik responded: "Just more lies from the Speaker." Following a conversation involving President Trump, the provision was added to the defense bill on December 3.

=== Executive ===
In October and November 2025, FBI director Kash Patel disbanded the CR-15 Public Corruption Unit at the Washington Field Office and dismissed multiple agents who had worked on Arctic Frost. In November 2025, at least four agents were terminated, with some briefly reinstated (at the intervention of US Attorney Jeanine Pirro because the agents were involved in Trump's deployment of Federal agents in Washington DC) before being terminated again. The FBI Agents Association criticized the dismissals as "a campaign of erratic and arbitrary retribution," stating that "an agent simply being assigned to an investigation and conducting it appropriately within the law should never be grounds for termination." According to CNN, "The reversals marked an unusual moment where the Trump-appointed US attorney has tried to override a decision of other political appointees as the FBI weathers dozens of firings. It also highlights the continued push by some leaders in the Trump administration to gouge the bureau of experienced investigators who had worked on past cases tied to Trump."

=== Judicial ===
On November 4, 2025, Republican Representative Brandon Gill filed articles of impeachment against Judge James Boasberg, who had signed the subpoenas and nondisclosure orders for the investigation. This was Gill's second impeachment resolution against Boasberg; he had previously filed articles in March 2025 over Boasberg's rulings blocking Trump administration deportation efforts. Local rules for the D.C. federal court state that the chief judge "must hear and determine all proceedings before the grand jury," suggesting Boasberg's role in signing the orders was procedural. The Administrative Office of U.S. Courts stated that DOJ nondisclosure order requests "typically do not attach the related subpoena" but instead "identify the subject accounts only by a signifier," such as a phone number, meaning Boasberg likely did not know the targets were members of Congress.

On November 18, 2025, six Republican senators sent a letter to D.C. Circuit Chief Judge Sri Srinivasan calling for Boasberg's administrative suspension pending impeachment proceedings. The letter, led by Senator Eric Schmitt and signed by Senators Mike Lee, Tommy Tuberville, Lindsey Graham, Kevin Cramer, and Bill Hagerty, stated: "Chief Judge Boasberg should be administratively suspended pending formal impeachment by the House of Representatives and, if impeached, an impeachment trial by the Senate." As of December 2025, Srinivasan has not publicly responded to the senators' letter.

Senator Ted Cruz, who chairs the Senate Judiciary Subcommittee on the Constitution, called Boasberg "a partisan, left-wing activist" who "needs to be removed from office". Senator Sheldon Whitehouse (D-RI), the ranking Democrat on the subcommittee, responded: "Impeachment is a wholly improper remedy when you disagree with a ruling from a federal judge, and lawmakers shouldn't be feeding into threats against the judiciary with a hearing like this." A Senate Judiciary subcommittee hearing scheduled for December 3, 2025, was postponed after Boasberg and another targeted judge declined invitations to testify. Roll Call reported that impeachment efforts had "stalled in the House" amid concerns about "breaking with a centuries-old tradition of not ousting judges based solely on their decisions".

=== State ===
In November 2025, Florida Attorney General James Uthmeier opened an investigation into JPMorgan Chase, alleging the bank's actions toward Trump Media & Technology Group occurred "in the shadow of" the Arctic Frost investigation. According to Uthmeier's letter to JPMorgan CEO Jamie Dimon, the Justice Department subpoenaed the bank on March 28, 2023, for records related to Trump Media, including records predating the company's existence. Uthmeier alleged JPMorgan "solicited large amounts of information from Trump Media unrelated to its business practices" and may have shared data with the Justice Department.

JPMorgan terminated Trump Media's accounts in March 2024, shortly before the company went public. A JPMorgan spokesperson stated the bank "follows the law in responding to subpoenas". In December 2025, Dimon denied allegations of politically motivated actions, stating the bank does not "debank people for religious or political affiliations" and that banks are legally compelled to comply with subpoenas.

== Reactions ==
=== Historical context ===
Congressional phone records have previously been subpoenaed in federal investigations. In 2017–2018, the Trump administration's DOJ secretly obtained records of Representatives Eric Swalwell and Adam Schiff, along with 43 staffers, as part of a leak investigation. The investigations closed without criminal charges. Inspector General Michael E. Horowitz reviewed the matter in December 2024, finding no evidence of political motivation but concluding the DOJ "failed to take sufficient account of constitutional separation of powers". The review prompted the DOJ to strengthen oversight procedures for obtaining congressional records. Following the Arctic Frost disclosures, Swalwell asked why many Republicans objecting to Smith's subpoenas had not objected when his records were obtained.

=== Political responses ===
After the disclosure, President Donald Trump criticized Special Counsel Jack Smith and called for his prosecution. Other officials called for further review of the matter.

FBI director Kash Patel and Senate majority leader John Thune criticized the investigation as an abuse of power. Patel stated the agents "weaponized law enforcement against the American people" and announced the firings and unit disbandment.

Attorneys for Special Counsel Jack Smith defended the investigation as "entirely proper, lawful, and consistent with established Department of Justice policy". Smith's attorneys defended the investigation as "entirely proper, lawful, and consistent with established Department of Justice policy," noting that career officials in DOJ's Public Integrity Section approved the subpoenas and that the limited temporal range was "consistent with a focused effort" to verify news reports about calls to senators regarding election certification.

Senator Chris Coons (D-Del.) stated the surveillance "would strike me as a significant invasion of the right of Senators to conduct their jobs, so this is something that needs urgent follow-up."

=== Legal and constitutional commentary ===
Attorney General Pam Bondi testified on October 7, 2025, that Arctic Frost represented "an unconstitutional, undemocratic abuse of power".

Conservative legal scholar Andrew C. McCarthy of the National Review defended the investigation, writing "The notion that there was something scandalous about leadership at the DOJ and FBI approving an investigation into conduct that resulted in viable criminal charges is ridiculous."

Stanley Brand, a senior fellow at Penn State Dickinson Law and former counsel to the House of Representatives, noted that the investigation "seemed to go against the Constitution's separation of powers doctrine" because certification of presidential elections falls within Congress's constitutional jurisdiction. Legal experts offered differing views on Fourth Amendment implications. Cheryl Bader, a former federal prosecutor and clinical associate law professor at Fordham University, stated that obtaining phone metadata is not legally a "search" requiring a warrant, citing the Supreme Court's 1979 ruling in Smith v. Maryland that pen registers collecting call information do not violate Fourth Amendment protections. However, Brett Tolman, a former federal prosecutor and chair of American justice at the America First Policy Institute, argued that the investigation demonstrated insufficient "guardrails" on FBI intelligence-gathering powers expanded after the September 11 attacks.

== See also ==
- Church Committee
- COINTELPRO
