= Walt Nauta =

American political aide (born c. 1982–83)

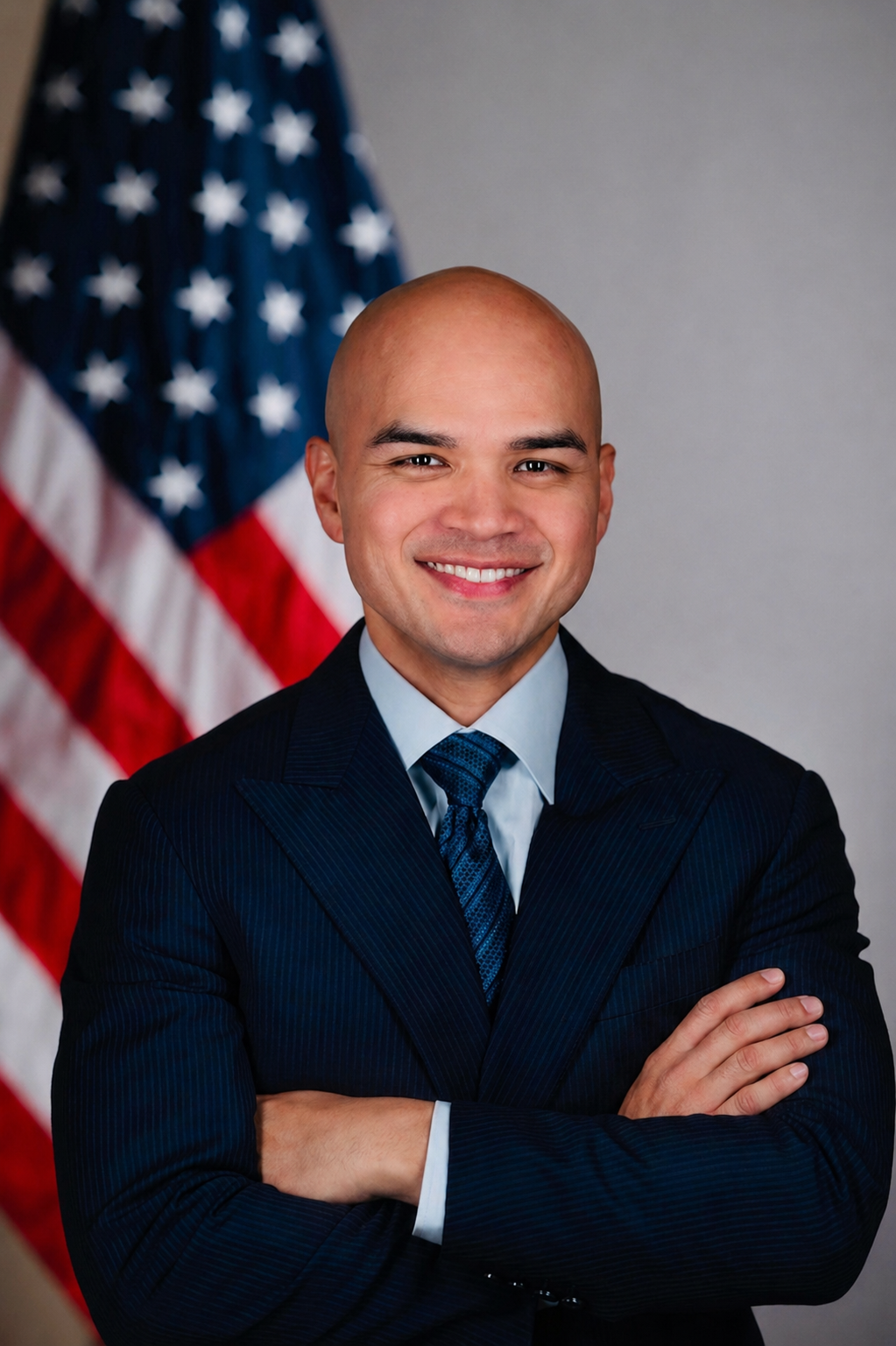
- Nauta in 2025

Director of White House Oval Office Operations
- Incumbent
- Assumed office January 20, 2025
- President: Donald Trump
- Preceded by: Richard Ruffner

Personal details
- Born: Waltine Torre Nauta Jr. 1982 or 1983 (age 43–44) Hågat, Guam, U.S.
- Occupation: Valet and body man
- Military career
- Branch: United States Navy
- Service years: 2001–21
- Rank: Senior Chief Petty Officer

Waltine Torre Nauta Jr. (born 1982 or 1983) is an American aide to U.S. president Donald Trump. While a petty officer in the U.S. Navy, Nauta was Trump's valet at the White House. After Trump's term ended, Nauta continued to work for him at Trump's Mar-a-Lago club and residence. Since 2025, he has served as director of Oval Office operations and deputy assistant to the president.

In June 2023, Nauta was indicted alongside Trump in a federal case that accused him of helping conceal classified documents Trump had retained at Mar-a-Lago. He pleaded not guilty, and a superseding indictment brought the total charges against him to eight. Judge Aileen Cannon dismissed the case in July 2024, ruling that special counsel Jack Smith had been appointed unlawfully. After Trump won the 2024 election, the Justice Department dropped its appeal, and the U.S. Court of Appeals for the 11th Circuit formally dismissed the charges against Nauta on February 11, 2025.

== Early life ==
Nauta was born in Hågat, Guam, and grew up there with five siblings. Hågat has been described as an insular community of mostly Chamorros, the Indigenous people of Guam. He graduated from Southern High School in nearby Sånta Rita-Sumai.

== Military career ==
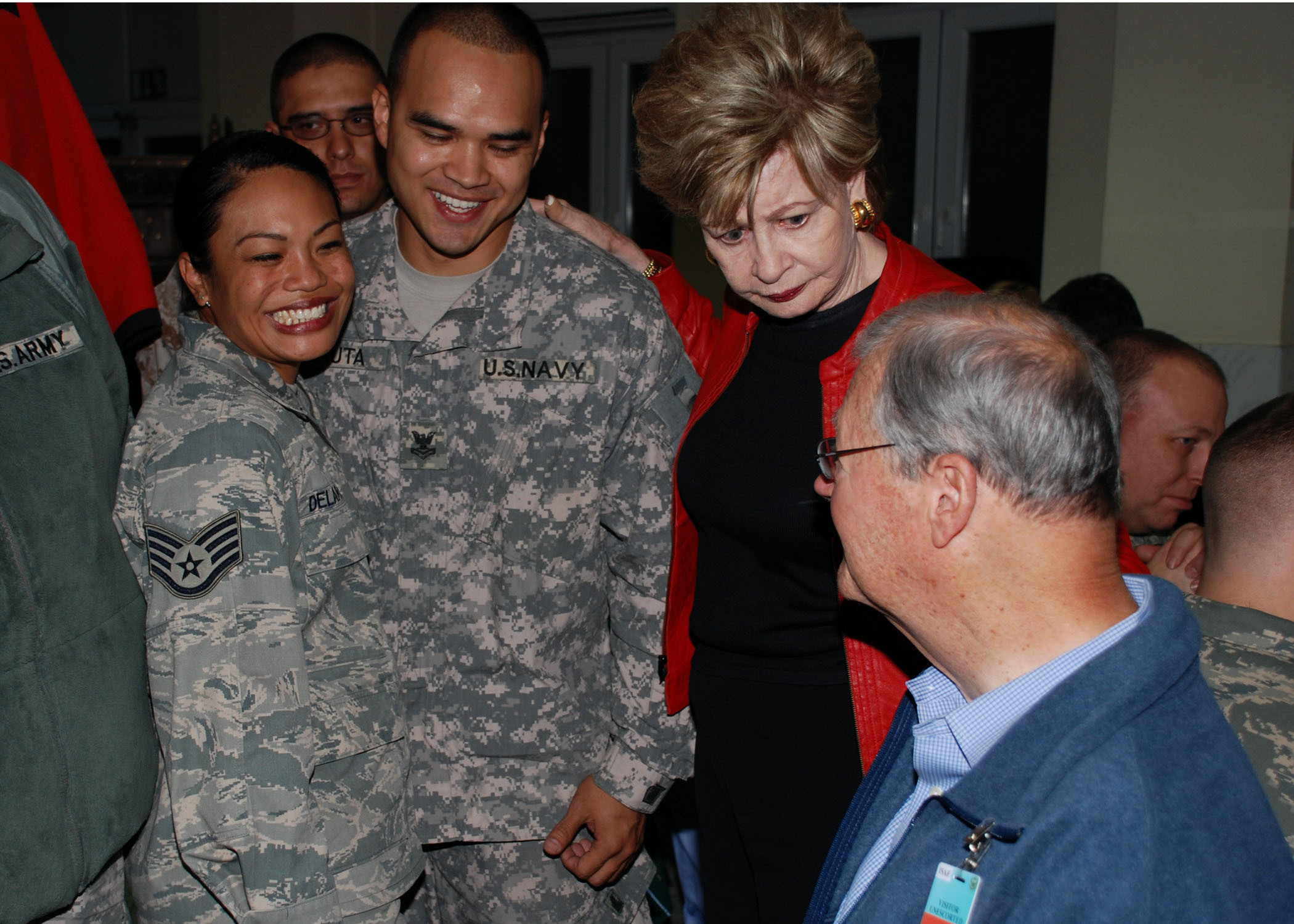
Nauta (second from left) in the U.S. Navy with Congressional delegates Madeleine Bordallo and Ike Skelton, 2008

Nauta enlisted in the U.S. Navy in July 2001. He was a cook, with the rating of culinary specialist. Among his Navy postings were stints with a strike fighter squadron in California, and at a submarine base in Georgia. In 2012, he was assigned to the Presidential Food Service, which is run by the U.S. Navy and manages the White House Mess as part of the White House Military Office.

During the presidency of Donald Trump, Nauta became a personal valet to the president. He was responsible for responding to the presidential call button, including when the president requested Diet Cokes, which Nauta would bring to Trump on a silver platter. Colleagues described Nauta as quiet and apolitical, known for staying out of internal and partisan squabbling and for anticipating the president's needs. Former aides said that, unlike many who grew close to Trump, he did not appear to be working a "side hustle" to profit from his access. Nauta was promoted to senior chief petty officer in September 2020.

Nauta's service in the Navy ended in September 2021.

== Trump aide ==
When Trump's term of office ended in January 2021, Nauta accompanied him to Mar-a-Lago, where he worked as Trump's butler and body man. He frequently traveled with Trump to public appearances and campaign events. By August 2021, Nauta was on the payroll of Trump's political action committee, Save America. He was also paid by Trump's 2024 presidential campaign beginning in November 2022.

== Federal investigation and indictment ==
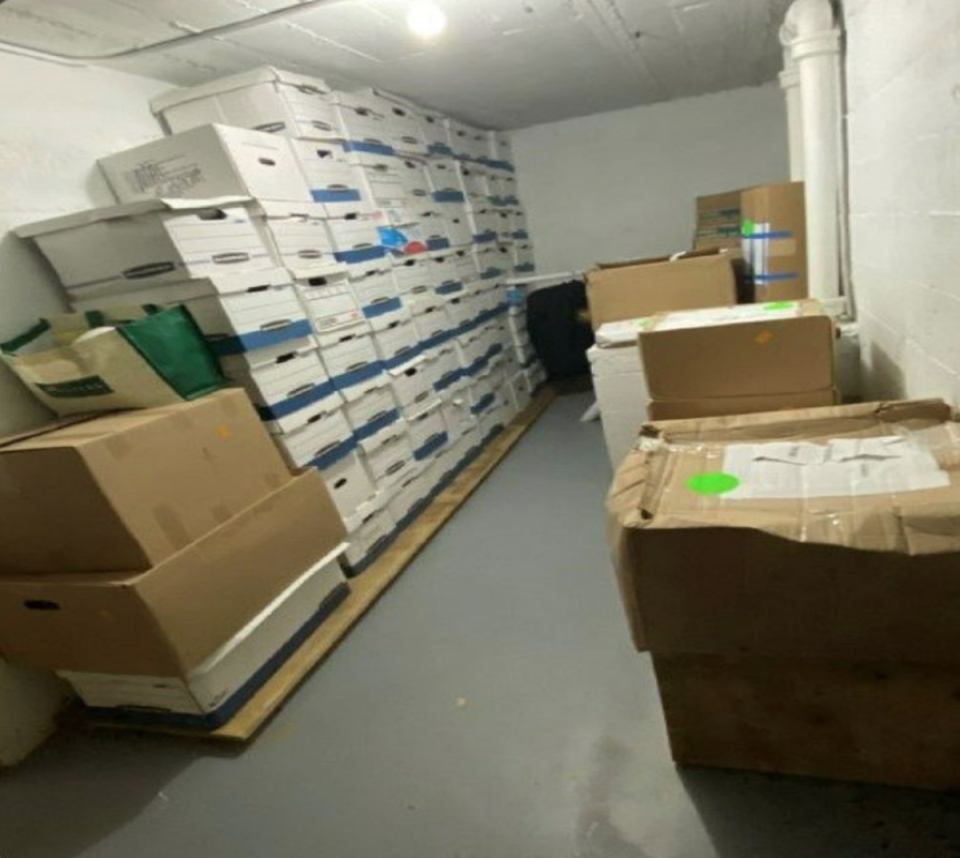
Storage room with document boxes at Mar-a-Lago

Nauta was called as a witness in the Federal Bureau of Investigation (FBI) investigation into Donald Trump's handling of government documents; the investigation began in 2022. Investigators with the independent special counsel investigation led by Jack Smith came to doubt Nauta's account of his activities, and beginning in fall 2022 considered whether to charge him with crimes. Nauta declined to cooperate with prosecutors, and on May 24, 2023, the special counsel formally notified Nauta that he was a target of the investigation.

On June 8, 2023, Nauta was co-indicted with Trump by a federal grand jury in the U.S. District Court for the Southern District of Florida, based in Miami. Nauta was indicted on six counts: conspiracy to obstruct justice, withholding a document or record, corruptly concealing a document or record, corruptly concealing a document in a federal investigation, scheme to conceal, and making false statements and representations.

According to the indictment, in the waning days of Trump's term in office, both Trump and Nauta packed items from the White House to ship to Mar-a-Lago. The indictment also alleged that, after a federal grand jury issued a subpoena in May 2022 requiring the return of the government documents, Nauta assisted Trump in concealing documents from the grand jury, the FBI, and Trump's own lawyers. On July 27, a superseding indictment was filed with two new counts of obstruction against Nauta, bringing the total counts against Nauta to eight.

The federal magistrate judge twice postponed Nauta's arraignment so Stanley Woodward—Nauta's Washington, D.C. lawyer, whose fees were paid by Trump's Save America political action committee—could find local counsel admitted to practice in the Southern District of Florida with whom to work, as required by court rules. (Woodward was not a member of the local court bar, and thus was appearing pro hac vice.) Nauta's attorney Stanley Woodward alleged in a court filing that at an August 2022 meeting, Jay Bratt, a senior prosecutor on Smith's team, had improperly linked Woodward's candidacy for a judgeship to whether Nauta would cooperate with prosecutors. Prosecutors denied any impropriety. In a filing unsealed in 2024, the special counsel's office said the exchange was "purely professional" and denied that anyone had threatened Woodward. At a May 2024 hearing, a prosecutor called the misconduct claim "garbage" and "a fantasy". In September 2023, House Judiciary Committee Chairman Jim Jordan opened an investigation into the allegations. Bratt retired from the Justice Department in January 2025 after 34 years.

Following extensive pre-trial motions, in July 2024, Judge Cannon held that the Justice Department appointed special counsel Jack Smith illegally. Smith ended the criminal case against Trump after his November presidential election win but appealed the dismissal of Nauta and De Oliveira. On February 11, 2025, the U.S. Court of Appeals for the 11th Circuit dismissed the case upon the federal prosecutor's request. Attorneys for Nauta and De Oliveira contested the charges and opposed the Justice Department's efforts to continue the case on appeal. The administration had the case dismissed rather than pardon Nauta. CNN reported that a pardon was avoided because it would "connote guilt".

== Trump second term ==
Nauta continued working for Trump during his second term. As of 2026, he serves as a deputy assistant to the president and director of Oval Office operations.

In March 2025, Trump nominated Nauta to the U.S. Naval Academy Board of Visitors, alongside former White House press secretary Sean Spicer, Representative Ronny Jackson, and Representative Derrick Van Orden.
