= Timothy Thibault =

American FBI official

Timothy R. Thibault is a former Federal Bureau of Investigation official who spent more than 30 years at the bureau. He served as Assistant Special Agent in Charge at the Washington Field Office, where he supervised public corruption investigations. In 2022, he became the subject of congressional scrutiny after Senator Chuck Grassley alleged political bias in his conduct. His attorneys denied all allegations, citing his record of investigating corruption in both political parties. Thibault retired from the FBI on August 26, 2022.

== Career ==
Thibault joined the FBI and spent nearly two decades investigating public corruption cases. He served as lead agent in the federal bribery investigation of Representative William J. Jefferson, a Louisiana Democrat. In 2007, NBC News footage showed Thibault interviewing Jefferson, who was later convicted on 11 of 16 charges. He was also involved in the corruption investigation of Representative Jesse Jackson Jr., an Illinois Democrat, who pleaded guilty to federal charges in 2013.

Thibault rose to the position of Assistant Special Agent in Charge (ASAC) at the FBI's Washington Field Office, where he supervised public corruption investigations. His attorneys at Morrison & Foerster later cited these cases as evidence of nonpartisan work, stating he had investigated members of both parties throughout his career.

== Arctic Frost investigation ==
In April 2022, Thibault approved the opening of the Arctic Frost investigation, an FBI investigation into efforts to overturn the 2020 presidential election. According to Senator Chuck Grassley, documents obtained by whistleblowers showed Thibault authored the case opening predication, which Grassley characterized as "self-approval" in violation of FBI protocol; The New York Times reported that FBI officials stated agents followed standard procedure when opening the investigation. The investigation was transferred to Special Counsel Jack Smith in November 2022.

== 2022 allegations ==
On May 31, 2022, Senator Chuck Grassley sent a letter to FBI Director Christopher A. Wray and Attorney General Merrick Garland alleging that Thibault had posted politically partisan content on social media. According to Grassley, Thibault had retweeted a Lincoln Project post calling Donald Trump "a psychologically broken, embittered, and deeply unhappy man," responded to a Liz Cheney tweet with "Your dad was a disgrace," and liked a LinkedIn article stating "William Barr has gone rogue." The Department of Justice Office of the Inspector General referred the matter to the Office of Special Counsel for review of potential Hatch Act violations.

In a July 25, 2022 letter, Grassley alleged that Thibault had "ordered closed" an avenue of investigation related to Hunter Biden in October 2020. Thibault lawyers said that he “did not supervise the investigation of Hunter Biden,” that Thibault was “not involved in any decisions related to any laptop that may be at issue in that investigation,” and that he “did not seek to close the investigation.”

== Response and retirement ==
Thibault's attorneys issued statements denying all allegations. They stated that Thibault "did not supervise the investigation of Hunter Biden," "was not involved in any decisions related to any laptop," and "did not seek to close the investigation." NBC News reported that sources familiar with FBI structure said an assistant special agent in charge would not have had authority to open or close an investigation involving a presidential candidate's son.

FBI Director Christopher A. Wray testified before the Senate Judiciary Committee on August 4, 2022, that the Hunter Biden investigation was being run out of the Baltimore Field Office under the supervision of Delaware U.S. Attorney David C. Weiss, a Trump administration appointee.

Regarding Thibault's social media posts, Wray told senators he found them "deeply troubling" and stated they were "not representative of the FBI."

Thibault retired on August 26, 2022. His attorneys stated he was "not fired, not forced to retire, not asked to retire," and had informed his supervisors approximately one month before his departure. They said he was eligible for retirement and left voluntarily. CBS News, citing two U.S. officials, reported that Thibault "resigned late last week and was walked out," but the officials clarified that "all of those who retire hand over their badge and gun and are escorted out" as standard procedure.

In a statement, Grassley said Thibault's "blatant partisanship undermined the work and reputation of the FBI."

Thibault's attorneys stated he "firmly believes that any investigation will conclude that his supervision, leadership and decision making were not impacted by political bias or partisanship of any kind" and that he was "confident that all of his decisions were consistent with the FBI's highest standards for ethics and integrity."

== See also ==
- List of FBI controversies
- Steven M. D'Antuono
