= Save America =

Political action committee run by Donald Trump

- Formation: November 9, 2020; 6 years ago
- Founder: Donald Trump
- Type: PAC – Nonqualified
- Registration no.: Federal Election Commission ID: C00762591
- Legal status: Leadership political action committee (leadership PAC)
- Location: Arlington County, Virginia, United States
- Leadership PAC Sponsor: Donald Trump
- Treasurer: Bradley T. Crate
- Affiliations: Make America Great Again Super PAC
- Staff: 44 (at least, as of August 2022)

Save America is a leadership political action committee founded and controlled by the first presidency of Donald Trump and second presidency of Donald Trump. It has been Trump's primary fundraising and political spending arm since he completed his first term in office. The PAC has spent more than $60 million on legal fees for the President and his allies since 2020, when it was created.

== History ==
President Donald Trump founded and controls the Save America leadership political action committee (leadership PAC). Save America was founded and registered with the Federal Election Commission on November 9, 2020, two days after the 2020 presidential election results were declared, when Joe Biden defeated Trump. Its treasurer is Bradley T. Crate, who had been Trump's campaign treasurer. It is located in Arlington, Virginia.

Save America has been Trump's primary fundraising and political spending arm since he left office. ABC News wrote that Trump and his allies "have consistently pushed supporters to donate to the PAC, often using false claims about the 2020 election and soliciting donations to rebuke the multiple investigations into the former president, his business dealings, and his actions on Jan. 6."

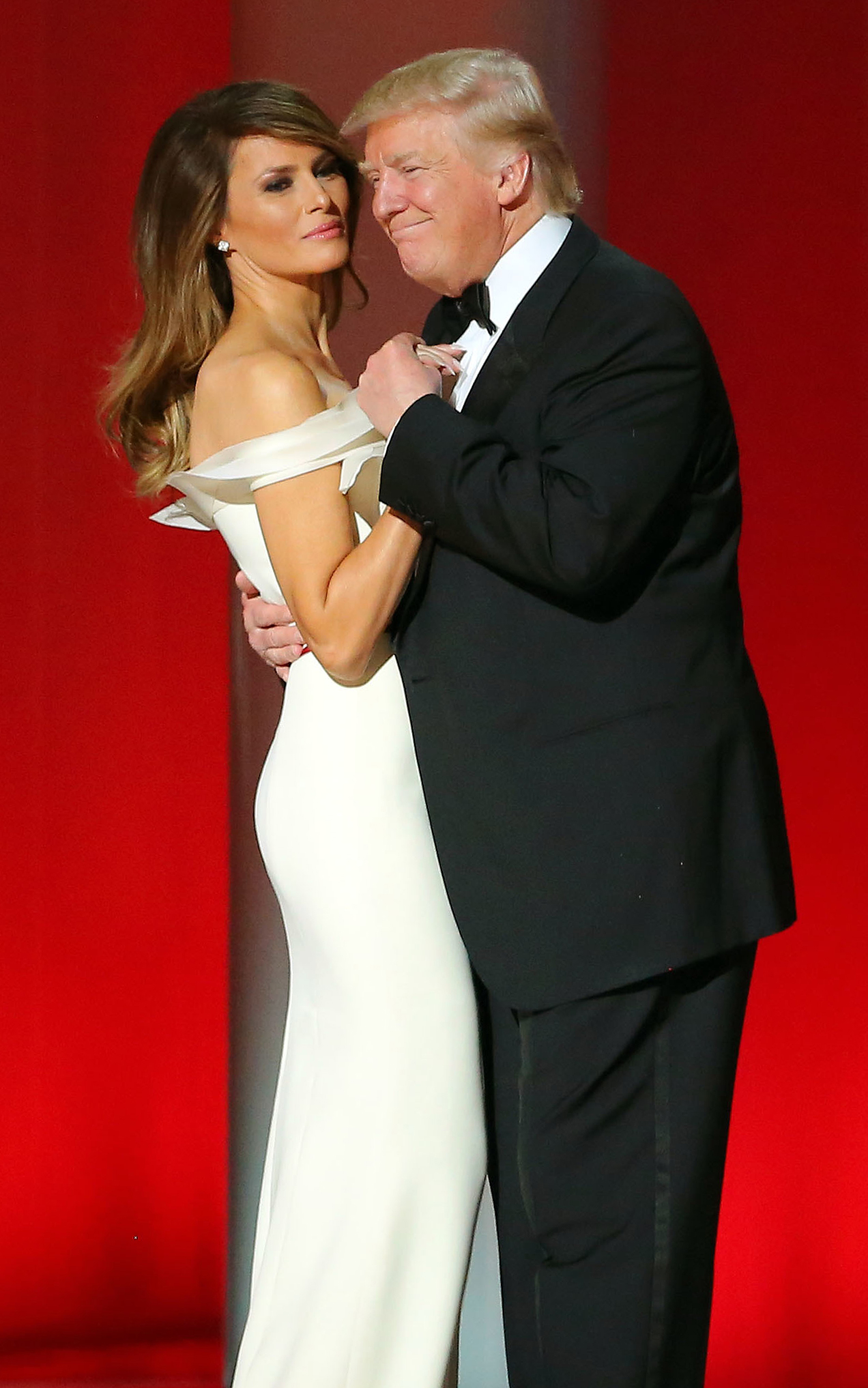
Donald Trump dancing with First Lady Melania Trump in his first term

Trump has used the PAC to pay for his post-presidential rallies, travel, staff expenses, $21.6 million in legal bills (including those of Trump confidants and aides called to testify before the January 6 attack US House committee), and portraits of himself and the former first lady that will one day hang in the Smithsonian's National Portrait Gallery ($650,000). Save America has also donated $1 million to the Conservative Partnership Institute (which is linked to former Trump chief of staff Mark Meadows); $1 million to the America First Policy Institute (which was started and is partly run by former officials of Trump's administration); $200,000 to Trump Hotel properties; and $132,000 to former first lady Melania Trump’s fashion stylist Hervé Pierre.

=== 2022 ===
In February 2022, Save America paid the legal fees charged by Stefan Passantino, a former Trump deputy White House counsel, to represent unemployed former White House aide Cassidy Hutchinson, who had been served with a subpoena by the January 6 attack US House Committee. After she was deposed, Hutchinson received a call from a top aide to Mark Meadows saying: "Mark wants me to let you know that he knows you’re loyal, and he knows you’ll do the right thing tomorrow and that you’re going to protect him and the boss." Concerned that her testimony was being conveyed to Trump, and suspecting Passantino's legal team of leaking it to him, she terminated Passantino's representation of her. Hutchinson then hired attorney Jody Hunt, who agreed to represent her on a pro bono basis.

As of June 2022, over 60% of contributions to Save America were from retirees.

Spending by Save America increased in August 2022 to over $6.3 million, its highest monthly total of the year to that point in time. That month Save America made a contribution of $150,000 to Wyoming Values, a super PAC working to defeat Republican US Representative Liz Cheney. The PAC began September 2022 with over $92 million in cash.

In October 2022 the PAC transferred $20 million to Trump's new MAGA Inc. Super PAC. In November 2022, the campaign finance watchdog Campaign Legal Center filed a complaint with the Federal Election Commission (FEC), alleging that the transfer was inappropriate inasmuch as Trump was already a presidential candidate when he made the transfer.

In November 2022, when Trump began his 2024 campaign for president, 99 cents out of every dollar that he raised online went to his campaign. One penny went to Save America. However, in February or March 2023 he adjusted that split, so that 90 cents of every dollar donated to him goes to his campaign, and 10% of donations go to Save America. Because generally a PAC such as Save America cannot spend money directly on the candidate's campaign, and conversely his campaign committee cannot directly pay for things that benefit the candidate personally, Save America can pay Trump's legal expenses, whereas his campaign cannot.

=== 2023 ===
In January 2023, Save America had $18 million of cash on hand. Through that date, the states from which it had raised the most money from residents were Virginia ($12 million), California ($8 million), and Texas ($7 million).

In June 2023, Trump's valet Walt Nauta was indicted by a federal grand jury; Save America is paying Nauta's legal bills. Nauta was charged with moving boxes at Trump's direction that included allegedly illegally retained classified documents and national defense-related documents to Trump's residence, and then lying about it to federal investigators. The charges are punishable by up to 90 years in prison, if Nauta is convicted.

As of July 1, 2023, Save America had less than $4 million. It requested a $60 million refund of a donation it had previously sent to Trump's MAGA Inc. Super PAC, which money had been intended for television commercials to help Trump's candidacy. It had spent $21.6 million on Trump-related legal fees in the first half of 2023, out of $25 million the PAC had spent overall in that time period.

=== 2024 ===
During the 2024 presidential election, Save America spent so much on legal fees that Trump's super PAC, MAGA Inc., sent $5 million a month back to Save America to keep it afloat.

== Investigation of PAC ==
It was reported in September 2022 that a Washington, D.C., federal grand jury had issued subpoenas to several witnesses seeking information related to the formation, fundraising activities, and receipts of monies and expenditures of Save America. Among those subpoenaed were junior and mid-level aides to Trump during and after his presidency, Nicholas Luna (former personal assistant to Trump), the chief financial officer for Trump's 2020 campaign, and the former chief of staff for Ivanka Trump. Dozens of subpoenas have been issued to companies that received money from Save America, including law firms.

== See also ==
- Great America PAC, a super PAC that supported Donald Trump in the 2016 presidential election
- America PAC, a super PAC that supported Donald Trump in the 2024 presidential election
