= Richard Nixon Presidential Library and Museum =

Presidential library and museum in Yorba Linda, California

Richard Nixon Presidential Library

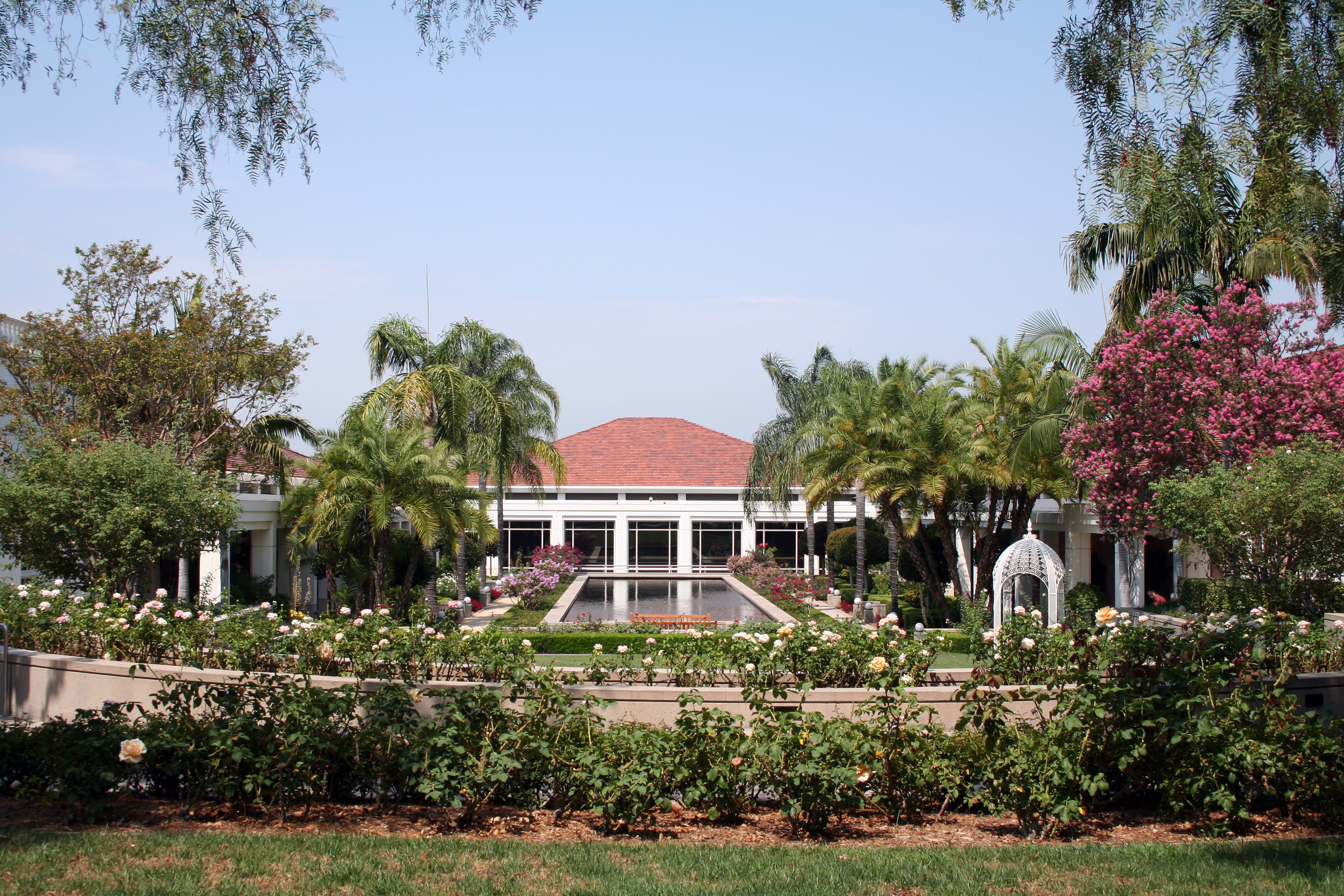
- Richard Nixon Presidential Library and Museum in 2006

- Location within the Los Angeles metropolitan area Location within California Location within the United States

General information
- Location: Yorba Linda, California, United States
- Coordinates: 33°53′21″N 117°49′10″W
- Named for: Richard Nixon
- Inaugurated: Dedicated on July 19, 1990; 36 years ago Rededicated on October 14, 2016; 10 years ago
- Cost: $15 million USD
- Operator: NARA; Richard Nixon Foundation

Technical details
- Size: 52,000 ft^{2} (4,800 m^{2})

Website
- nixonlibrary.gov

The Richard Nixon Presidential Library and Museum is the presidential library and burial site of Richard Milhous Nixon, the 37th president of the United States (1969–1974), and his wife Pat Nixon.

Located in Yorba Linda, California, on land that Nixon's family once owned, the library is one of 13 administered by the National Archives and Records Administration (NARA). The 9-acre (3.6 ha) campus is located at 18001 Yorba Linda Boulevard and incorporates the Richard Nixon Birthplace, a National Historic Landmark where Nixon was born in 1913 and spent his childhood.

From its dedication on July 19, 1990, until July 11, 2007, the library and museum was operated by the private Richard Nixon Foundation and was known as the Richard Nixon Library & Birthplace. The facility underwent an extensive renovation in 2016 and now features updated, multimedia museum exhibits. The complex is jointly operated by NARA and the Richard Nixon Foundation.

== Background ==
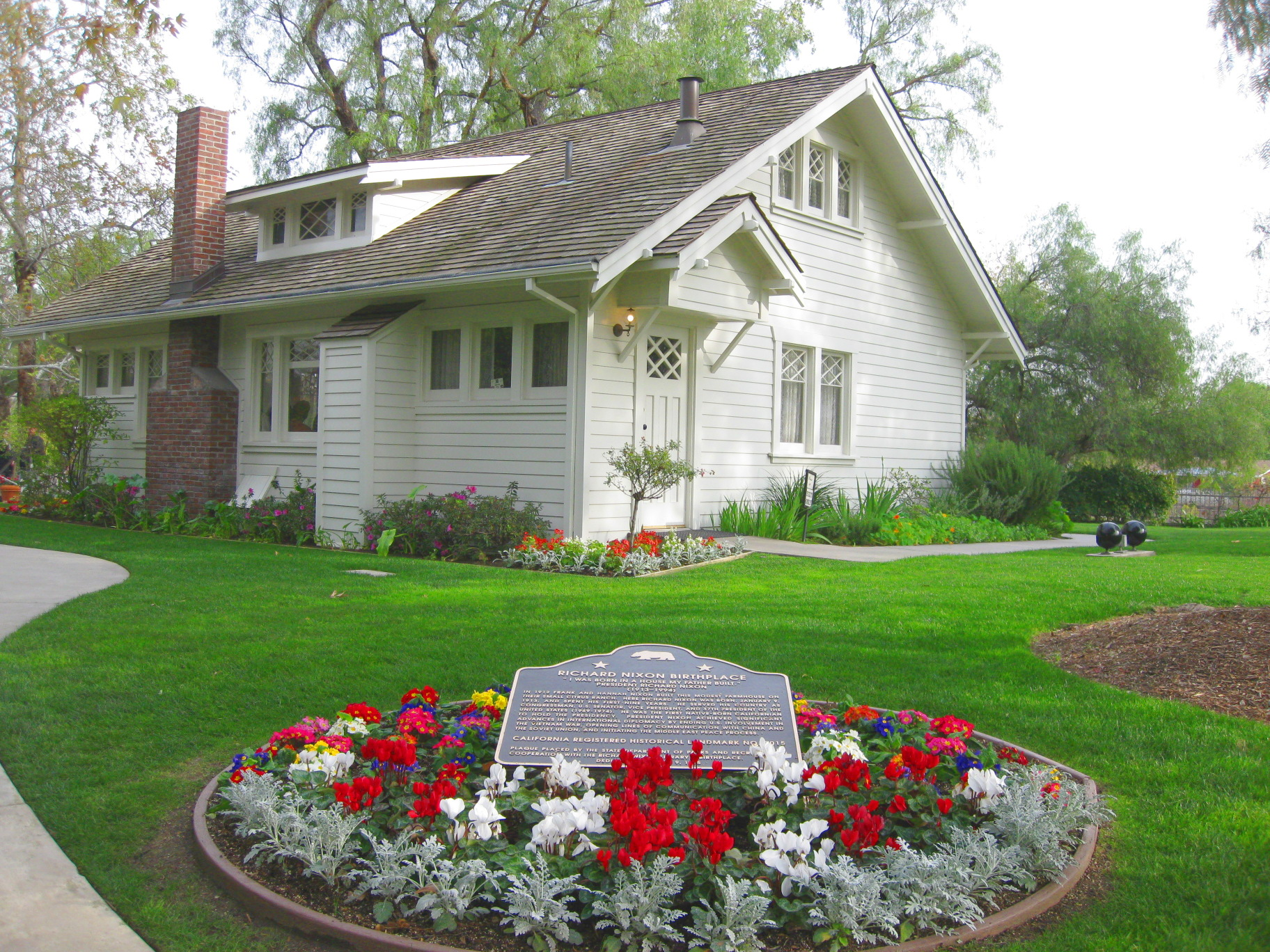
The rear entrance of Richard Nixon's birthplace

The Nixon Presidential Library was originally going to be built on the edge of Duke University, Nixon's alma mater, but due to protests largely driven by a group of Duke professors, the plans failed.

Historically, all presidential papers were considered the personal property of the president. Some took them at the end of their terms while others destroyed them. In 1939, Franklin D. Roosevelt was the first to make them available to the public when he donated them to the National Archives, as the Franklin D. Roosevelt Presidential Library and Museum, doing so voluntarily. The Watergate scandal and Richard Nixon's subsequent resignation from office complicated the issue.

In September 1974, Richard Nixon made an agreement with the head of the General Services Administration, Arthur F. Sampson, to turn over most materials from his presidency, including the tape recordings he had made of conversations in the White House. The recordings were to be destroyed after September 1, 1979, if directed by Nixon, or by September 1, 1984, or his death otherwise.

Alarmed that Nixon's tapes may be lost, Congress abrogated the Nixon–Sampson Agreement by passing the Presidential Recordings and Materials Preservation Act, which was signed into law by President Gerald Ford in December 1974. It applied specifically to materials from the Nixon presidency, directing NARA to take ownership of the materials and process them as quickly as possible. Private materials were to be returned to Nixon.

As a result of the Presidential Recordings and Materials Preservation Act, President Nixon's White House papers and tapes were held by the National Archives, and so they could not be transferred to a facility in Yorba Linda. Funding to build the Nixon Library came from private sources. The estimated cost to build the institution was $25 million. In December 1988, ground was broken by Julie Nixon Eisenhower, the youngest daughter of President Nixon and Mrs. Nixon.

== Dedication ==
The library complex was officially dedicated on July 19, 1990. Former president Nixon and first lady Pat Nixon were present, as were President George H. W. Bush, former president Gerald Ford, former president Ronald Reagan, and first ladies Barbara Bush, Betty Ford, and Nancy Reagan. A crowd of 50,000 gathered for the ceremony. At the dedication, Nixon said, "Nothing we have ever seen matches this moment–to be welcomed home again."

== Facilities ==
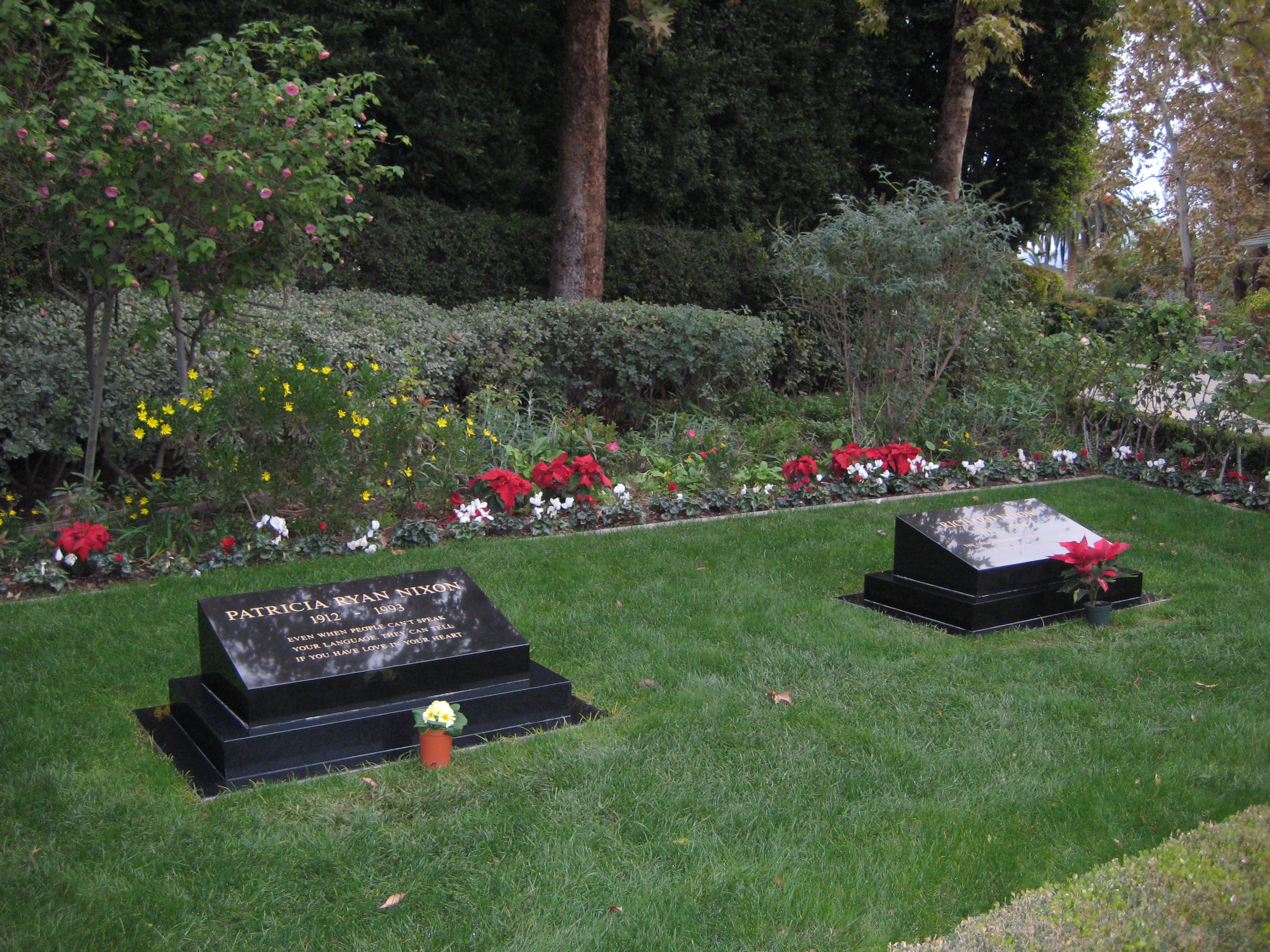
The graves of President Richard Nixon and First Lady Pat Nixon located on the library grounds.

The museum, housed in a 52,000-square-foot (4,800 m^{2}) building, offers a narrative of Nixon's life and career. Behind the museum is his birthplace, which was constructed by Nixon's father using a home building kit, and restored to appear as it was in the 1910s. President Nixon and Pat Nixon are buried on the grounds, just a few feet from the birthplace.

The Nixon Library compound contains the Katharine B. Loker Center and Annenberg Court, a 38,000-square-foot (3,500 m^{2}) wing constructed in 2004, which includes a special exhibit room and an exact replica of the East Room of the White House that is used as an event space. The Nixon Foundation leases the East Room for events such as weddings and business meetings.

== Presidential Museum ==
A tour of the library, 2016.

There is an extensive collection of memorabilia, artifacts, formal clothing, and photographs of the Nixons and their children. This collection includes an assortment of bronze figures of world leaders who had important relations with Nixon as president or during his service as vice president under President Dwight D. Eisenhower from 1953 to 1961. The leaders have been accurately recreated in lightweight bronze over a papier-mâché frame, and they are dressed in their actual clothing.

The U.S. government limousine used by President Nixon throughout his presidency, a customized 1969 Lincoln Continental, is on display in the domestic affairs gallery. A 12-foot-high (3.7 m) piece of the Berlin Wall is exhibited in the expansive foreign affairs gallery, which includes a replica of a modest Midwest home from where American soldiers originated, statues of Nixon and Chinese premier Zhou Enlai and pages of the Strategic Arms Limitation Treaty I signed by Nixon and Soviet General Secretary Leonid Brezhnev in 1972.

Lieutenant Colonel Gene Boyer, President Nixon's chief helicopter pilot, secured the president's VH-3A "Sea King" helicopter, tail number 150617, for display on the library grounds. The helicopter was in the presidential fleet from 1961 to 1976, transporting Presidents Kennedy, Johnson, Nixon, and Ford, and many foreign heads of state and government. Boyer flew President Nixon dozens of times to Camp David, over the pyramids in Egypt, and on his final flight from the White House in this aircraft.

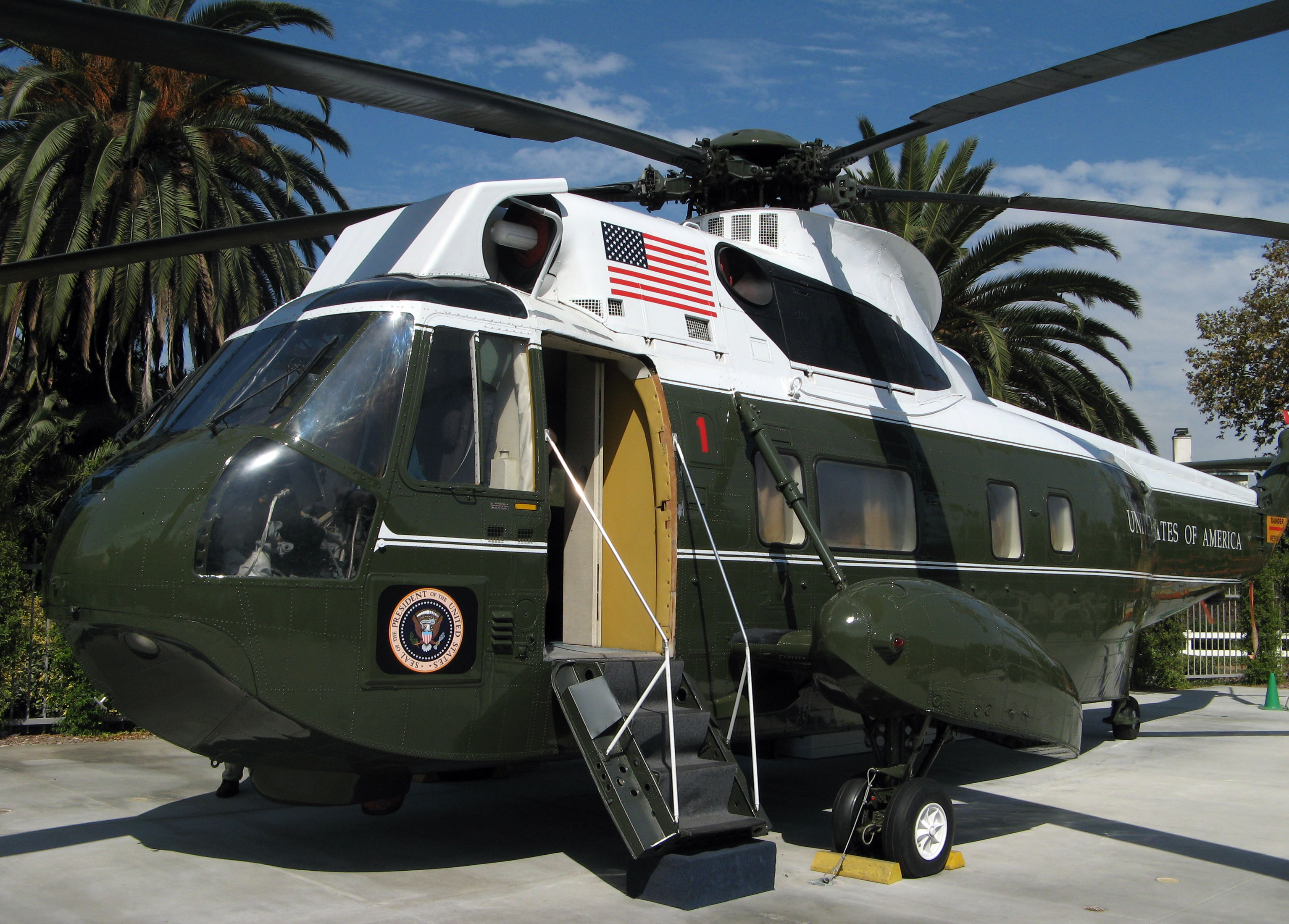
The President's VH-3A "Sea King" helicopter on display

The entire facility underwent a $15 million renovation in 2016, and reopened in October, with appearances from Henry Kissinger, former California governor Pete Wilson and Chinese ambassador to the United States Cui Tiankai. The new museum includes nearly 70 exhibits, including a replica of President Nixon's Oval Office.

Much of the media surrounding the reopening referred to the museum's appeals to the Millennial generation. USA Today called it "a video-centric, cutting-edge experience" in which "guests are constantly invited to try touch screens or other interactive displays." The museum galleries were fact-checked for accuracy by four historians appointed by the National Archives. The money was raised entirely from private sources.

The Nixon Library administers the Nixon Geography Challenge, a 35-question test of countries and sites around the world, to middle school students in Yorba Linda. Test takers with high scores are honored at the library with a certificate of distinction.

== Joint operation with the National Archives ==
In January 2004, the United States Congress passed legislation that provided for the establishment of a federally-operated Nixon Presidential Library. Specifically, the legislation amended the Presidential Recordings and Materials Preservation Act of 1974, which mandated that Nixon's presidential materials were to remain in National Archives II facility in College Park, Maryland. Under this new legislation, over 30,000 presidential gifts as well as millions of presidential records were moved from College Park to Yorba Linda.

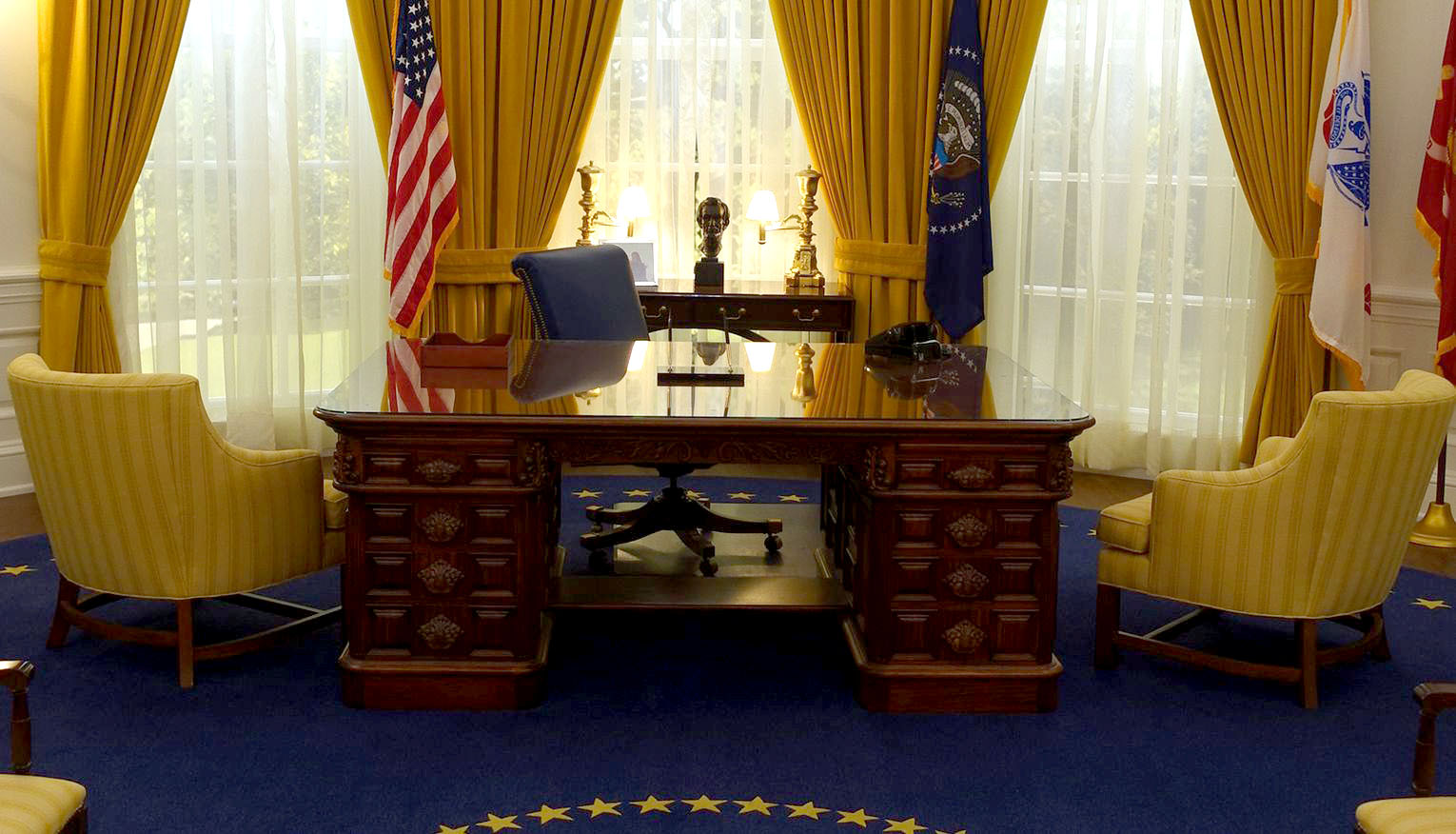
The Nixon Library has a full-scale, exact replica of President Nixon's Oval Office that guests can enter and interact with. It was created as part of a $15 million renovation of the entire facility in 2016.

In March 2005, the Nixon Foundation invited the National Archives to jointly operate the Nixon Library, and then-Archivist of the United States Allen Weinstein allowed for the Nixon Library to become the twelfth federally funded presidential library, operated and staffed by NARA, in conjunction with the Nixon Foundation. In April 2006, Weinstein appointed Timothy Naftali as the inaugural director of the federal Nixon Presidential Library. On July 11, 2007, the Richard Nixon Presidential Library and Museum was officially welcomed into the federal presidential library system.

Before the National Archives took over its management, the Nixon Library had been accused by several media outlets of glossing over Nixon's 1974 resignation with "whitewashed" exhibits; Naftali himself later described the private library's original Watergate exhibit as presenting a partisan narrative that downplayed presidential wrongdoing and blamed Nixon's enemies for his downfall. In 2007, the National Archives removed the Watergate exhibit that had been in place for 17 years and, after three years of empty exhibit space, announced that the new exhibit was scheduled to open in July 2010. The Nixon Foundation objected to the proposed exhibit, specifically the process by which the proposed exhibit was crafted, due to the fact that the Nixon Foundation was not consulted in the way that other presidential foundations are in similar situations. The foundation filed a 158-page memorandum to the assistant archivist for presidential libraries expressing its dissatisfaction and NARA stated a committee would review the objection but gave no timeline for when that process would be concluded. According to Naftali, when the new exhibit neared completion in 2010, Archivist David Ferriero established an internal review board in response to pressure from Nixon loyalists, but ultimately overruled the board's recommendations and approved the exhibit. The exhibit opened on March 31, 2011.

In November 2011, the director of the library, Timothy Naftali, resigned his position. In December 2014, Michael Ellzey was appointed as Director by the Archivist of the United States, David Ferriero. Ellzey began serving as Director in January 2015. In April 2023, Ellzey was succeeded as Director by Tamara Martin, the former California state archivist, who was appointed by Acting U.S. Archivist Debra Steidel Wall.

== Library collections ==
The archives, which opened in March 1994, a month before Nixon's death, house approximately 46 million pages of official White House records from the Nixon Administration. The Nixon Library now holds all of President Nixon's presidential, as well as his pre- and post-presidential papers.

As of 2012, all processed Nixon presidential materials are available for research use at the Nixon Library.

== See also ==
- Presidential memorials in the United States
- List of burial places of presidents and vice presidents of the United States
