= FBI search of Mar-a-Lago =

2022 FBI search of Donald Trump's home

- Part of Plasmic Echo
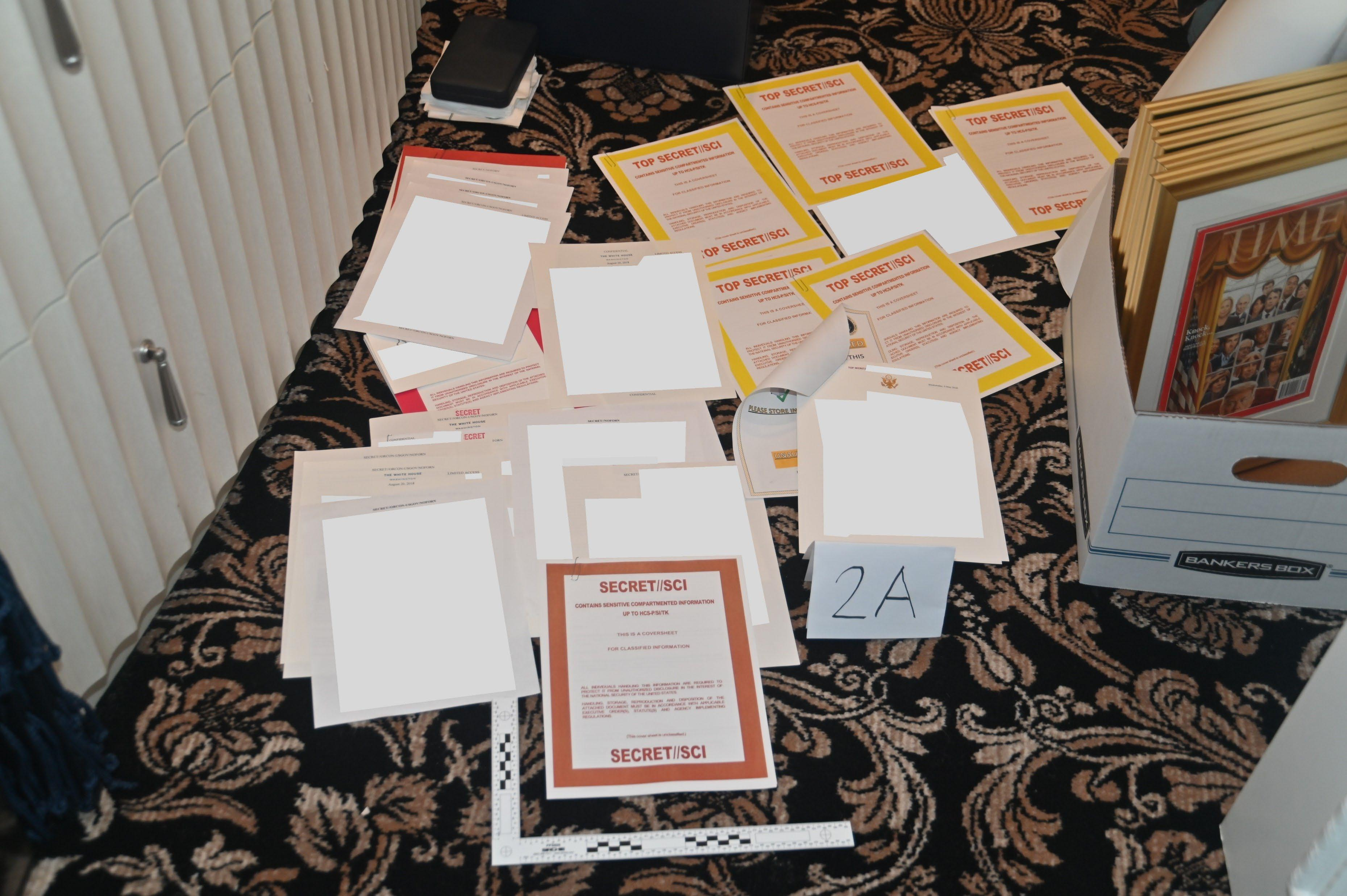
- Evidence seized, arrayed, and photographed by the FBI at Mar-a-Lago on August 30, 2022
- Date: August 8, 2022
- Location: Mar-a-Lago
- Motive: To recover classified documents which had reportedly been illegally kept by former United States president Donald Trump
- Outcome: The seizing of over at least 300 classified government documents from Trump's Florida residence, as well as the seizing of 48 empty folders labeled "classified" Appointment of Jack Smith to investigate Trump's handling of classified documents Second indictment of Donald Trump

On August 8, 2022, the Federal Bureau of Investigation (FBI) executed a search warrant at Mar-a-Lago, the residence of then-former U.S. President Donald Trump in Palm Beach, Florida.

The search warrant application was authorized by U.S. Attorney General Merrick Garland and approved by Magistrate Judge Bruce Reinhart, following a criminal referral by the National Archives and Records Administration (NARA). The order, unsealed a few days after the search, showed that the FBI obtained the search warrant as part of an investigation into Trump relating to three federal criminal statutes:

- violations of the Espionage Act regarding unauthorized retention of national defense information;
- destroying or concealing records "with the intent to impede, obstruct, or influence" federal government activity;
- illegal removal or destruction of federal government records (without respect to cause).

Later, courts released the affidavit with redactions, giving the public a window into the FBI's goals in this search and what the FBI seized. In 2021, NARA tried to recover material, and Trump went through the material in his possession at the end of that year. Between May 23 and June 2, 2022, Trump's employee Walt Nauta allegedly moved 64 boxes in and out of a storage room, according to surveillance footage subpoenaed by the Justice Department and as described in the indictment. The Justice Department said the classified documents at Mar-a-Lago were likely "concealed and removed" to block investigation.

Over 13,000 government documents were recovered. They included nuclear-related information and FBI, CIA, and NSA information about national security interests. Of these documents, 337 were classified: 197 handed over in January 2022, 38 turned over under subpoena in June 2022, and 102 seized in the August search of Mar-a-Lago. Months later, at least two more documents with classified markings were uncovered at Trump locations.

On June 8, 2023, Trump was indicted on federal charges related to the documents. On June 13, Trump surrendered to federal custody and was arrested, booked, processed, and arraigned in the U.S. District Court of South Florida. Trump pleaded not guilty to all 37 charges. On July 27, a new version of the indictment (superseding the old) added three counts against Trump. However, the judge dismissed the case on July 15, 2024. Though the special counsel initially appealed this dismissal, he dropped his appeal following Trump's election to the presidency that November and resigned before Trump took office.

== Background ==
=== Handling, storage, and disposition of U.S. government records ===
The Presidential Records Act (44 U.S.C. ch. 22) establishes that presidential records belong to the United States and must be surrendered to the Archivist of the United States at the end of a president's term of office (or second term of office, if consecutive). Unauthorized removal and retention of classified information of the United States government is a criminal offense under U.S. federal law; it has been a felony since the enactment of the FISA Amendments Reauthorization Act of 2017, which was signed into law by President Donald Trump in January 2018 and increased the maximum term of imprisonment for this offense from one year to five years.

==== Criminal laws listed on search warrant ====
The search warrant and accompanying affidavit listed three federal criminal statutes as the basis of the investigation: "18 U.S.C. §§ 793, 2071, [and] 1519". The Sections cited are:

- § 793, enacted as part of the Espionage Act of 1917, makes the unauthorized retention or disclosure of documents related to national defense, which could be used to harm the United States or aid a foreign adversary, a crime. The maximum penalty is 10 years in prison. (Note: 18 U.S.C. § 793: Gathering, transmitting or losing defense information.) The Espionage Act was passed before the development of the modern classification system of the United States government, and thus does not refer to the classification status of the documents; unclassified "national defense information" would still be covered under the Espionage Act. As noted by the Congressional Research Service, the "affidavit supporting the warrant focuses on subsection (e), which applies when an individual is in unauthorized possession of certain national defense information".
- § 2071 criminalizes the theft or destruction of government records, regardless of their relevance to national security. The maximum penalty is 10 years in prison. (Note: 18 U.S.C. § 2071: Concealment, removal, or mutilation generally.)
- § 1519, enacted as part of the Sarbanes–Oxley Act, criminalizes the act of destroying or concealing documents or records, regardless of their relevance to national security, "with the intent to impede, obstruct or influence the investigation or proper administration of any matter" within the jurisdiction of any federal department or agency. The maximum penalty is 20 years in prison. (Note: 18 U.S.C. § 1519: Destruction, alteration, or falsification of records in Federal investigations and bankruptcy.)

==== Classified material and the presidency ====
Beginning in 1940, U.S. presidents have used the constitutional and statutory powers of the president of the United States to create classification systems through executive orders. The Code of Federal Regulations contains rules for classified material as 32 CFR 2001.

Generally, the president and the United States National Security Council set information security policy such as the sharing and classification of information. The day-to-day oversight of the government-wide classification system is handled by the Information Security Oversight Office (ISOO), a component of the National Archives.

===== Declassification, presidential powers and regulations =====
Since the 1988 Supreme Court decision in Department of the Navy v. Egan, there is consensus that a sitting president has broad Constitutional powers to classify (and declassify) information. However, there are procedures for doing so. Following former President Trump's claims that the documents found at Mar-a-Lago had been declassified, the Congressional Research Service issued a policy paper in August 2022 highlighting relevant regulations: per 32 CFR 2001.25, the declassification process requires markings "uniformly and conspicuously applied to leave no doubt about the declassified status of the information and who authorized the declassification".

In 2003, Scooter Libby, former chief of staff to Vice President Dick Cheney, claimed to have received a direct but unrecorded disclosure order from President George W. Bush and Cheney to leak classified information to reporters. In what became known as the Plame affair, Libby was ultimately not charged for releasing classified information. Steven Aftergood, a critic of U.S. government secrecy policy, said the case "highlights the fact that the president purports to, or does, stand outside of the classification system".

===== Protocols for loss or compromise of classified material =====
Federal regulations require that "any person who has knowledge that classified information has been or may have been lost, possibly compromised or disclosed to an unauthorized person(s) shall immediately report the circumstances to an official designated for this purpose." Regulations also require notification of the Director of the ISOO if the specific classified information could attract "significant public attention", if the information in question is voluminous, or if a key vulnerability has been exposed. The Department of Justice is also to be consulted if criminality is suspected.

== Events leading to the search ==
When Trump left the White House, he brought government documents with him. "From January through March 15, 2021," the grand jury alleged, "some of Trump's boxes were stored in The Mar-a-Lago Club's White and Gold Ballroom, in which events and gatherings took place. Trump's boxes were for a time stacked on the ballroom's stage". In March, they were moved to a "business center". In April, they were moved to a "bathroom and shower" in the Lake Room.

=== NARA actions to retrieve presidential records from Mar-a-Lago ===
In February 2021, the National Archives and Records Administration (NARA), the federal agency that preserves government records, asked Trump to return presidential documents. By May 2021, NARA realized they were missing the correspondence sent from North Korean dictator Kim Jong-un to Trump. They also knew they were missing other presidential documents like the altered Hurricane Dorian map. NARA contacted Trump's representatives. On May 6, NARA emailed Trump's lawyers with the request for their "immediate assistance" to return the Kim letters along with "roughly two dozen" boxes that were in Trump's White House residence during the final days of his presidency and that were sent to Florida, although Cipollone had determined they should have been sent to NARA. That month, Trump allegedly had some of the boxes brought to the Bedminster Club.

In June 2021, NARA instructed a former lawyer in Trump's White House counsel's office to send them the Kim letters via FedEx. On June 24, boxes in the Mar-a-Lago Lake Room were moved to the storage room.

On November 21, 2021, a White House employee flew to Mar-a-Lago and advised Trump: "Whatever you have, give everything back. Let them come here and get everything. Don't give them a noble reason to indict you, because they will." In an FBI interview a year later, this person said they had believed that Trump would return the boxes to NARA.

NARA and Trump's lawyers continued to negotiate. Between November 2021 and January 2022, Trump allegedly had his employees bring boxes out of the storage room and into his residence so he could review their contents. Trump did not request that they retrieve any specific boxes, nor any specific number of boxes, per the testimony of his valet Walt Nauta, who retrieved boxes and said he was unaware of their contents. Nauta took "roughly 15 to 17" boxes stored near Trump's bedroom in a room called Pine Hall, and "we transferred them into my car; from my car to the semi truck", as he would tell investigators several months later.

==== Partial return of records to NARA ====
In January 2022, NARA retrieved 15 boxes of documents, gifts, and other government property from Mar-a-Lago that should have been transferred to NARA at the end of Trump's term. The boxes included documents from the CIA, the FBI, and the National Security Agency on a variety of topics of national security interest. Archivists and federal agents determined that 184 unique documents (totaling 700 pages) had classification markings, of which 25 documents were marked "top secret", 92 "secret" and 67 "confidential". This material included:

- "sensitive national security information", including signals intelligence and the Kim letters
- documents governed by special access programs (SAP), a type of protocol reserved for extremely sensitive U.S. operations conducted abroad, intended to significantly limit access to the information
- documents marked as "HCS, FISA, ORCON, NOFORN, and SI"

The document about Iran that he showed off at Bedminster in July 2021 may have been among the documents surrendered at this time; a military document marked "TOP SECRET//NOFORN" was in Trump's possession until January 17, 2022, and Trump was eventually charged with possessing it.

Trump attorney Alex Cannon helped to transfer these 15 boxes to NARA. The documents were stored in a sensitive compartmented information facility (SCIF) while DOJ officials considered how to proceed.

==== Trump's statement regarding return of records ====
After transferring the 15 boxes, Trump dictated a statement that "everything" requested by NARA had been returned, and he told Cannon to send a similar statement to NARA. Cannon declined because he was not sure it was true, and a different statement was released three days later, saying that "[t]he papers were given easily and without conflict and on a very friendly basis".

==== NARA makes criminal referral ====
On February 7, 2022, NARA put out a news release acknowledging the receipt of the 15 boxes and the claim by Trump's representatives that they would look for more material. On February 8, NARA lawyer Gary Stern told colleagues that Cannon had told him he was unsure whether all relevant documents had been turned over. NARA itself had noted "reams of classified material and disorganized boxes" and remained suspicious, according to the Washington Post. On February 9, NARA sent a criminal referral to the Department of Justice (DOJ).

==== Tom Fitton's advice to Trump ====
Tom Fitton, president of activist group Judicial Watch, advised Trump in February 2022 not to give any more records to NARA. As justification, Fitton cited a 2012 case in which a federal judge said that NARA had no authority to designate materials as "presidential records" nor did it have the right to seize materials. (Note: Judicial Watch, Inc. v. NARA, No. 10-1834 (D.D.C. March 1, 2012).) That case concerned audio tapes of historian Taylor Branch privately interviewing his friend, Bill Clinton, during Clinton's presidency. Though NARA had previously said the tapes were private property, Judicial Watch demanded NARA seize the tapes and hand them over to Judicial Watch. The judge dismissed the lawsuit.

Trump embraced Fitton's position and would continue to include him in discussions over a year later.

=== FBI/DOJ launches criminal investigation and issues subpoenas ===
May 10, 2022, letter, from Debra Steidel Wall, Acting Archivist of the United States, to M. Evan Corcoran, attorney for former president Donald J. Trump

In April 2022, the DOJ opened a criminal investigation and initiated a grand jury process and instructed NARA not to share further details about the materials recovered from Mar-a-Lago with the House Oversight Committee. The FBI interviewed Trump administration officials and aides at Mar-a-Lago about the handling of presidential records, including former White House Counsel Pat Cipollone and his former deputy Patrick Philbin.

On April 12, 2022, NARA said it would let the FBI access the documents retrieved from Mar-a-Lago. Trump's lawyers sought to delay this outcome. On May 10, Debra Steidel Wall, the acting Archivist of the United States, wrote to Trump's attorney Evan Corcoran to reiterate that Trump had taken hundreds of pages of classified materials with him, including highly classified Special access programs materials, and that their extended negotiations over alleged executive privilege was delaying investigations and threat assessments already underway. She said that based on legal counsel she had decided not to honor their request for further delays. An ally of Trump made the letter public on August 22. When NARA provided the FBI with access to the records it retrieved, the FBI provided copies to individual agencies of the US Intelligence Community to conduct classification reviews and determine whether their disclosure could put at risk sensitive sources.

==== May 2022 subpoena ====
Trump's team, anticipating a subpoena, practiced moving documents. Some officials have referred to this behavior as a "dress rehearsal".

On May 11, the DOJ subpoenaed Trump for "any and all documents or writings in the custody or control of Donald J. Trump and/or the Office of Donald J. Trump bearing classification markings". Corcoran met with Trump at Mar-a-Lago and began taking detailed notes (including voice memos) of several weeks of conversations in which he explained to Trump that he would indeed have to turn over all such documents or else risk the FBI searching Mar-a-Lago. Trump's advisers also repeatedly urged him to fully comply, and Trump eventually told them he had done so and did not want to discuss it further.

On May 12, the DOJ issued a grand jury subpoena to the National Archives for the classified documents they had provided to the House select committee investigating the January 6 United States Capitol attack.

On May 22, Walt Nauta, Trump's personal assistant, spent a half-hour in the storage room and removed one box, according to the grand jury's allegations. Over the following days, at Trump's direction, Nauta removed about 64 boxes from the storage room and brought them to Trump's residence: three boxes on May 24, about 50 on May 30, and about 11 on June 1. When questioned by the FBI, at first Nauta denied any knowledge of the classified documents, but in a second interview he admitted his and Trump's involvement. Photos of him moving boxes on June 1 have since been made public.

On June 2, Corcoran was scheduled to arrive in the afternoon to review the boxes in the storage room. At midday, before Corcoran's arrival, Mar-a-Lago maintenance chief Carlos de Oliveira together with Nauta moved about 30 boxes into the storage room, as shown on security footage. Corcoran was not informed that about 64 boxes had been moved out over recent days and that about 30 boxes had been moved in just hours previously. While Corcoran was in the storage room, Trump allegedly had someone change a lock on a closet at the front of the estate. The Secret Service used to have the key to the lock, but Trump reportedly wanted to be in charge of the key. In the storage room, Corcoran found 38 documents with classified markings and sealed them in an envelope.

On June 3, Nauta asked Brian Butler, a 20-year-employee of Mar-a-Lago who ran the car service, for an Escalade so he could help load Trump's luggage onto a plane as Trump and his family departed for New Jersey. Butler lent him the car. Nauta and de Oliveira loaded boxes onto the plane. Butler assisted them, as handling Trump's luggage was normally part of his job; he did not know the boxes contained anything unusual.

Later that day, investigators from the DOJ and the FBI came to Mar-a-Lago to retrieve the subpoenaed material. They met with Trump's attorneys, one of whom gave the agents 38 classified documents with HCS, SI and FISA markings in "a single Redweld envelope, double-wrapped in tape". Trump's custodian of records, Christina Bobb, gave the DOJ a signed declaration that had been drafted by Corcoran, attesting that all classified material had been returned (though Trump's team may have been aware this was not true).

During this visit, FBI agents noticed over 50 boxes in the storage room, but Trump's lawyers said they couldn't look inside. With the help of an informant, the DOJ came to believe that more classified documents remained on the premises.

On June 8, the FBI told Trump's team to better secure the storage area, so Trump aides added a padlock to the room. Less than two weeks later, Trump notified NARA to add Kash Patel, a former Trump administration official, and journalist John Solomon as "representatives for access to Presidential records of my administration."

==== June 2022 subpoena ====
On June 22, the DOJ emailed a draft of the grand jury's subpoena to one of Trump's attorneys. It asked the Trump Organization for surveillance footage of the Mar-a-Lago storage room. On June 23, Trump called de Oliveira. The following day, the FBI served the subpoena, asking for views from outside the storage room between January 10 and June 24. At 1:25 p.m., Corcoran spoke with Trump about it by phone. Within a few hours, Nauta changed his travel schedule for the next day; while he had planned to accompany Trump to Illinois, he now told others he would go to Palm Beach, Florida instead, and gave inconsistent reasons for his schedule change.

On June 25, de Oliveira advised Butler that Nauta was about to arrive, that he sought information about old surveillance footage, and that his trip should be kept secret. On the morning of June 27, de Oliveira asked Yuscil Taveras, who worked in the IT office, how long security footage stayed on the server. Taveras said he believed it was generally retained for 45 days. De Oliveira said "the boss" wanted the footage deleted, but Taveras resisted. In early afternoon, de Oliveira and Nauta spoke in person, and in late afternoon, de Oliveira spoke to Trump by phone.

In response to the subpoena, on July 6, the Trump Organization provided a hard drive. The footage showed Nauta moving the boxes.

On July 10–12, Trump was at Mar-a-Lago "checking on the boxes," as one witness told investigators. Normally, he is in New Jersey at that time of year, and his residence at Mar-a-Lago was undergoing construction so he would have been unlikely to stay there. His trip to Mar-a-Lago was "kept quiet."

=== FBI/DOJ obtains search warrant from federal court ===
Federal emails disclosed in December 2025 revealed that the FBI initially did not believe that it had probable cause to obtain a search warrant against Trump, but pursued one under pressure from the Biden Department of Justice. Nevertheless, an unnamed source told the Miami Herald that federal agents were able to establish probable cause because they suspected he was unlawfully withholding other classified information. The warrant was obtained by the Justice Department's National Security Division at the request of NARA to collect material that Trump had potentially not turned over to NARA. The New York Times reported: "Two people briefed on the classified documents that investigators believe remained at Mar-a-Lago indicated that they were so sensitive in nature, and related to national security, that the Justice Department had to act". However, Attorney General Merrick Garland had contemplated for weeks whether to approve the application for the search warrant, after many meetings between senior DOJ and FBI officials.

The search warrant showed that the FBI was investigating Trump for suspected violations of three Title 18 federal laws – Section 793 (a part of the Espionage Act of 1917); Section 1519 (part of the fiscal oversight Sarbanes–Oxley Act); and Section 2071. Trump had not been charged with any crime. If charged and convicted under the third law, Trump would be "disqualified from holding any office under the United States". However, a number of legal scholars have questioned the constitutionality of that provision in the statute.

Federal magistrate judge Bruce Reinhart of the U.S. District Court for the Southern District of Florida approved the warrant on August 5, 2022. Reinhart, who had previously been a federal prosecutor for a decade, was misidentified by some sources as being a Trump appointee, but the position in fact is one filled by the courts themselves.

Reviewing and approving search warrants is a typical duty of federal magistrate judges. Legal experts noted that, given the high profile of the operation, the application for a search warrant (granted on probable cause) would have been first scrupulously scrutinized by federal authorities. Will Hurd, a former CIA agent and former Texas Republican congressman, said: "Trump and his lawyers admitted to and then handed over presidential documents improperly taken from and stored outside the White House. Of course the FBI had probable cause to go in looking for more".

== Search of Mar-a-Lago ==
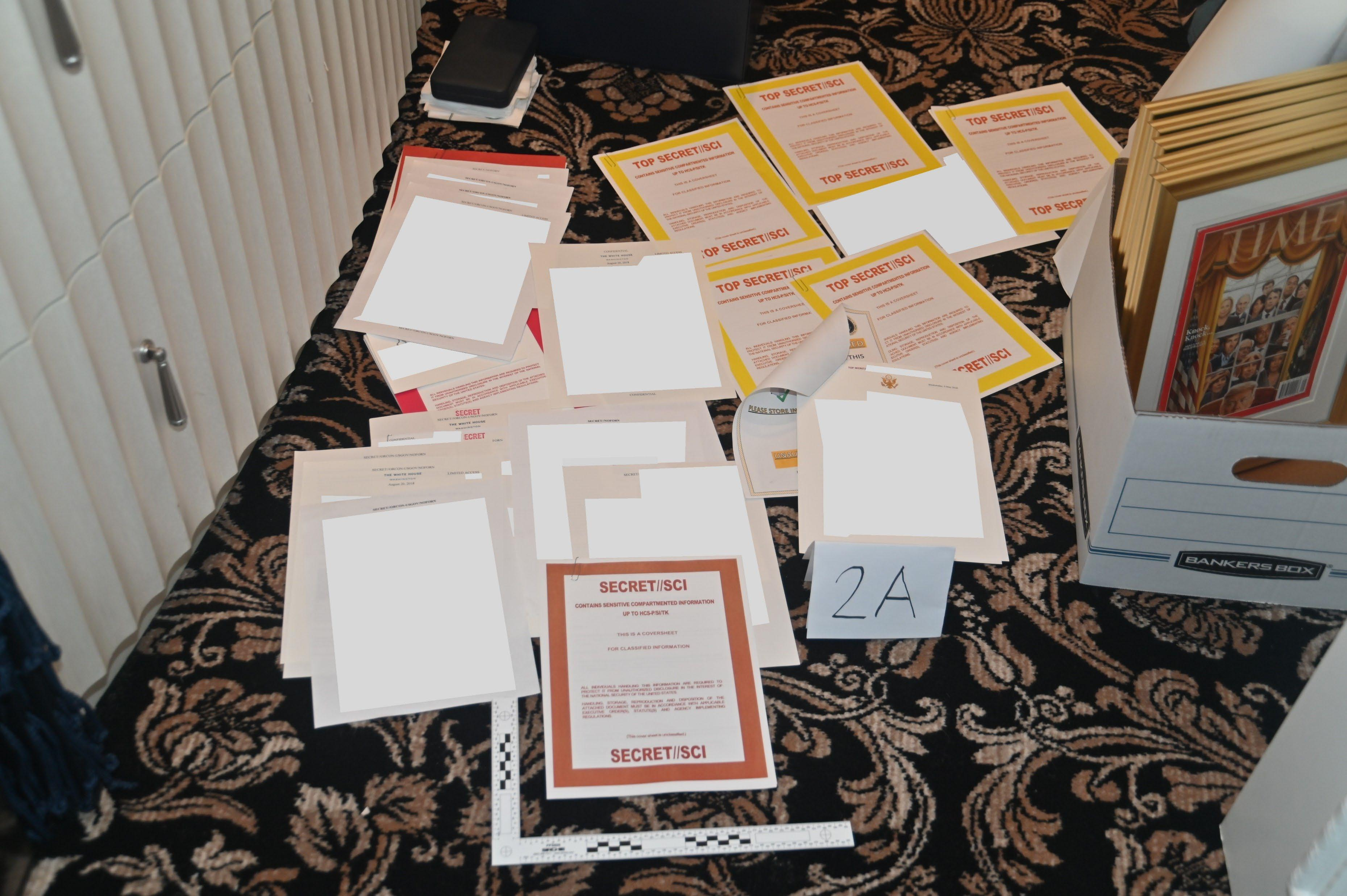
Classified cover sheets and documents found and photographed in the search of Mar-a-Lago. White areas are redactions. (Note: United States' Response to Motion for Judicial Oversight and Additional Relief (with Attachments), In re Search of Mar-a-Lago, No. 22-cv-81294 (S.D. Fla. August 30, 2022) (Dkt. 48, −1). The photograph reproduced here is Attachment F.)

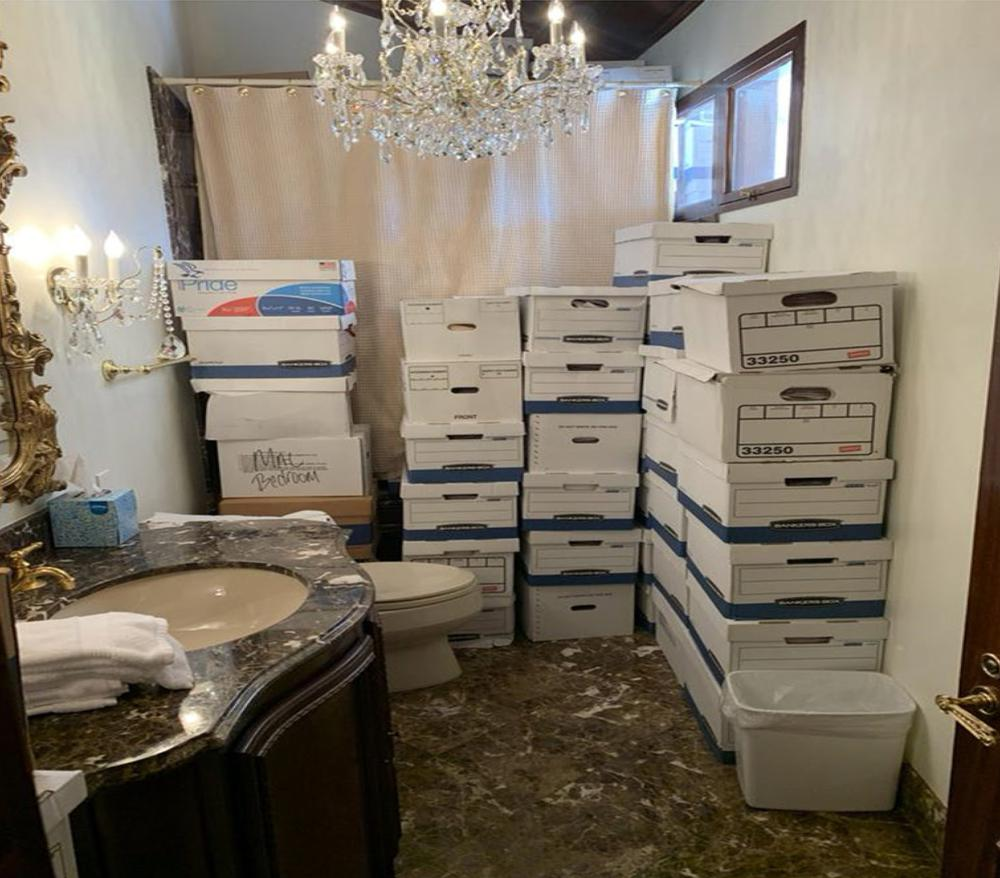
Boxes of classified documents stored in a bathroom at Mar-a-Lago

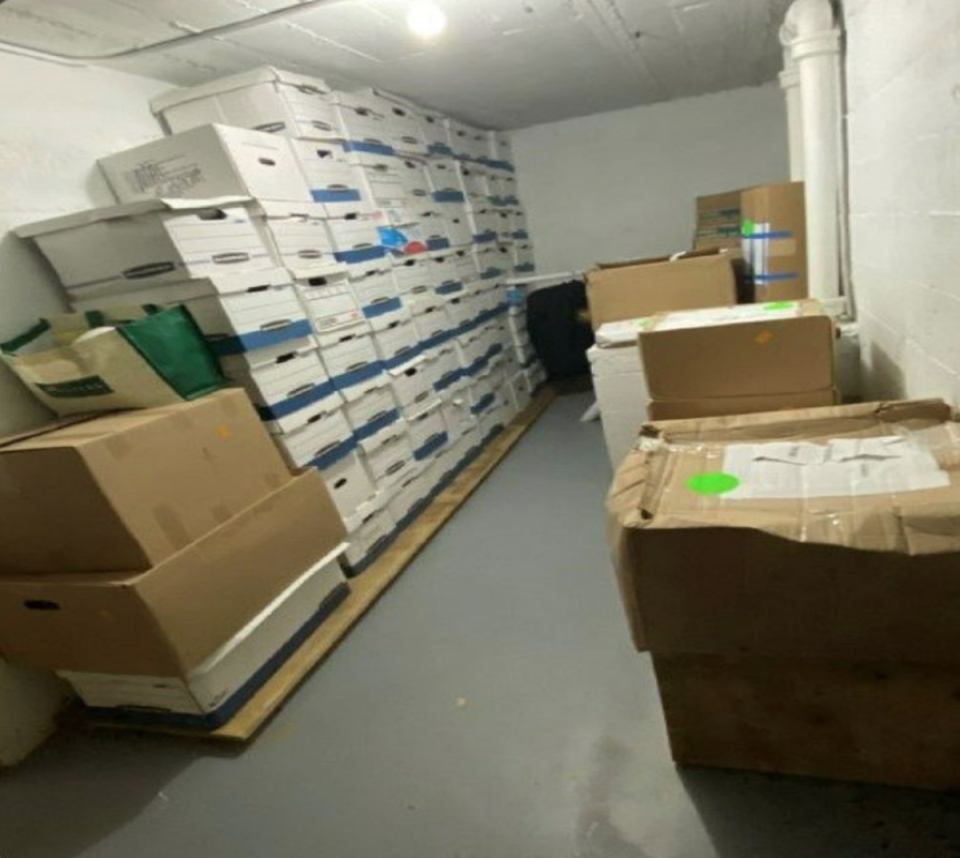
Boxes of classified documents in a Mar-a-Lago storage room

On August 8, 2022, at 8:39 am, FBI agents searched Trump's residence at Mar-a-Lago for the material specified in a warrant, including classified material. The material pertained to special access programs according to The New York Times and – according to The Washington Post – nuclear weapons. The FBI notified the Secret Service of the search a few hours in advance. The Secret Service facilitated the FBI's access to Mar-a-Lago, but did not participate in the search.

Trump's son, Eric, said on Fox News that he received a call about the search and informed his father shortly thereafter. Two of Trump's lawyers, Christina Bobb and Lindsey Halligan, were present for the search but were not allowed inside. Trump and his family watched most of the FBI search from New York remotely via a live video feed transmitted from Mar-a-Lago's system of security cameras. Trump and his attorneys refused the FBI's requests to turn off the cameras. Eric Trump later said that his family would release the footage "at the right time".

FBI agents conducted the search using "taint teams" to ensure that no privileged correspondence between Trump and his lawyers were removed. The New York Times reported the FBI agents "carried out the search in a relatively low-key manner" and intentionally did not wear the usual navy-blue agency jackets. FBI agents searched a storage unit in the basement, where they broke through the newly installed padlock. They further searched what was called Trump's "45 Office," where they opened a "hotel-style" safe containing "nothing of consequence", and finally Trump's residence. Classified documents were also recovered from unsecured locations, and were found outside of the locked storage room. In accordance with the usual procedure for executing search warrants, the FBI provided Trump's counsel with a copy of the warrant and a detailed three-page manifest, called a property receipt, which listed the inventory of seized records. The FBI agents concluded the search at 4:33 p.m. and a receipt for property was provided to Trump's Attorney at 6:19 p.m. before agents left the property around 6:30 p.m. with the boxes.

The FBI did not search a locked closet near the front of the estate (of which the FBI agents were aware during the search) nor a "hidden room" connected to Trump's bedroom (of which they were unaware), according to ABC News in February 2024. It is not clear whether any classified documents were in the rooms.

Peter Schorsch, the publisher of Florida Politics, was the first to report on the event. Trump also publicly acknowledged the search.

The next day, August 9, at Mar-a-Lago, Trump aide Molly Michael found notes that Trump had previously given her written on the back of documents with classification markings. She helped turn over those documents to the FBI on the same day.

Days later, some Mar-a-Lago employees were aware that the FBI had failed to search at least one room. Investigators with the Smith special counsel investigation learned of this before Trump was indicted in June 2023, and they interviewed several witnesses.

The FBI afterwards issued another subpoena for surveillance video from Mar-a-Lago for the weeks leading up to the search, suggesting Trump may still be withholding additional government documents.

On August 26, Nauta asked a Trump employee to confirm in a group chat on Signal that de Oliveira remained loyal to Trump. The employee did so, and Trump called de Oliveira to say he would get him a lawyer.

In November, a longtime Mar-a-Lago employee quit his job. He had helped move boxes and had heard certain conversations between de Oliveira and Nauta that were mentioned in the indictment.

Judge Beryl Howell noted, "More classified-marked documents still were uncovered in November 2022 in a leased storage unit, in December 2022 in the Office at Mar-a-Lago, and apparently sometime thereafter in the former president’s own bedroom at Mar-a-Lago". The documents were found by Trump's attorneys, who provided them to the FBI in January 2023.

=== Search of other Trump properties ===
On December 7, 2022, it was reported that additional documents with classified markings had recently been found at another Trump location in West Palm Beach, following a search of multiple locations, by a team hired through Trump's legal representatives. The documents were handed over to the FBI. Following this disclosure, the DOJ said Trump had not complied with the subpoena issued in May, but Judge Beryl Howell decided not to hold him in contempt of court.

== Release of search warrant, property receipt, and affidavit ==
=== Release of search warrant and property receipt ===
The August 12, 2022, order to unseal along with the unsealed search and seizure warrant, and property receipt

U.S. Attorney General Merrick Garland announcing the DOJ motion to unseal the search warrant

In keeping with longstanding DOJ reticence to comment on ongoing investigations, as well as the tight limits Attorney General Merrick Garland placed on such public statements, the government did not initially comment on the search.

While the DOJ remained silent, a person close to Trump contacted a DOJ official to send a message from Trump to Garland. Trump wanted Garland to know that people around the country were angered by the search and what Trump could do to "reduce the heat".

On August 11, the DOJ filed a motion in court to unseal the search warrant and property receipt, unless Trump objected to making them public. (Note: United States' Motion to Unseal Limited Warrant Materials, In re Sealed Search Warrant, No. 22-mj-8332 (S.D. Fla. August 11, 2022) (Dkt. 18).) On the same day, Garland held a press conference, in which he said that the department had filed a motion to unseal the warrant and the property receipt "in light of the former president's public confirmation of the search, the surrounding circumstances, and the substantial public interest in this matter", and that he had personally approved the decision to seek the search warrant. Garland also said that "upholding the rule of law means applying the law evenly, without fear or favor" and criticized "recent unfounded attacks on the professionalism of the FBI and Justice Department agents and prosecutors".

Trump later said on social media that he supported the release of the warrant and related documents, though he declined to release them himself, and his legal team agreed that the court should release them. The search warrant and property receipt were unsealed (made publicly available) on the afternoon of August 12, (Note: The documents were obtained and reported on by multiple news organizations on August 12 before the formal unsealing, as they were acquired by multiple news organizations.) with the signatures of two FBI agents redacted.

A year later, it was revealed that there had been a total of eight search warrants and affidavits. The government wanted them to remain secret, and it was not revealed whether the other seven had been for different locations nor what material had been sought.

==== Seized materials ====
FBI agents seized over 13,000 government documents, among which they found 103 classified government documents. Documents and empty folders with classified markings were found both in the basement storage room and in Trump's 45 Office. The classified material was grouped into 11 sets. Of the classified material:

- 18 documents were marked top secret, and one of these sets had the control system protocol "top secret/SCI" (i.e., sensitive compartmented information).
- 54 documents (grouped into three sets) were marked secret.
- 31 documents (grouped into three sets) were marked confidential.

Some documents were related to Trump's pardon of his ally Roger Stone and some were related to the president of France. The property receipt, signed by Trump's attorney Christina Bobb at 6:19 p.m. at the end of the search, showed that Trump possessed documents marked "TS/SCI" and another item labeled "Info re: President of France".

During the search, one personal and two official passports belonging to Trump, the personal and one official one expired, were taken from a desk drawer in Trump's office and later returned to him. In an August 30 court filing, the DOJ noted that the passports were located in a desk drawer in Trump's office that "contained classified documents and governmental records commingled with other documents" and thus subject to the terms of the warrant.

Of the 13,000 documents seized, the Justice Department's filter team set aside 520 pages as potentially subject to attorney-client privilege.

On September 6, The Washington Post reported that some of the seized documents contained details of special-access programs requiring special clearances on a need-to-know basis that could only be granted by "the president, some members of his Cabinet or a near-Cabinet-level official". They would normally be kept in a "secure compartmented information facility, with a designated control officer to keep careful tabs on their location." One of the documents described "a foreign government's military defenses, including its nuclear capabilities". Topics included Iran's missile program and U.S. intelligence operations involving China.

==== Missing materials ====
On October 1, 2022, The Washington Post reported that, according to two unnamed sources, NARA had informed the House Oversight Committee that some presidential records had not been recovered. On October 6, The New York Times reported that, according to two unnamed sources, the Justice Department informed Trump's lawyers "in recent weeks" that Trump is still holding material.

In December 2023, CNN reported that:

a binder containing highly classified information related to Russian election interference went missing at the end of Donald Trump’s presidency, raising alarms among intelligence officials that some of the most closely guarded national security secrets from the US and its allies could be exposed [...] In the two-plus years since Trump left office, the missing intelligence does not appear to have been found. The binder contained raw intelligence the US and its NATO allies collected on Russians and Russian agents, including sources and methods that informed the US government’s assessment that Russian President Vladimir Putin sought to help Trump win the 2016 election. [...]

According to the report, in the final days of his presidency, Donald Trump intended to declassify and release publicly multiple documents related to the FBI's Russia investigation. Several copies of the binder, with varying levels of redactions, ended up in the Justice Department and the National Archives, but an unredacted version went missing.

=== Motions to release search warrant affidavit ===
Many newspapers and media organizations motioned to unseal the probable-cause affidavit which had been submitted to the judge on August 5 in support of the search warrant application. (Note: These included the conservative group Judicial Watch and the Times Union (of Albany, New York); (Note: Judicial Watch, Inc.'s Motion to Unseal Search Warrant, In re Sealed Search Warrant, No. 9:22-mj-8332 (S.D. Fla. August 10, 2022) (Dkt. 4).) CNN, The Washington Post, NBC News, and Scripps; (Note: Motion of The Washington Post, CNN, NBC News, and Scripps to Intervene, for Access to All Search Warrant Records, and in Support of the United States' Partial Motion to Unseal, In re Sealed Search Warrant, No. 9:22-mj-8332 (S.D. Fla. August 11, 2022) (Dkt. 22).) The New York Times Company; (Note: The New York Times Company's Motion to Intervene for the Limited Purpose of Obtaining Access to Search Warrant Court Records with Supporting Memorandum of Law, In re Sealed Search Warrant, No. 9:22-mj-8332 (S.D. Fla. August 10, 2022) (Dkt. 8).) and CBS, the Palm Beach Post, the Miami Herald, the Tampa Bay Times, the Wall Street Journal, the Associated Press, and ABC.)

In court filings, DOJ opposed the affidavit's release, writing that "this investigation implicates highly classified materials" and that disclosure would compromise the integrity of the criminal investigation and the cooperation of witnesses in the matter and "other high-profile investigations"; the DOJ also cited "widely reported threats made against law enforcement personnel in the wake of the August 8 search". The DOJ said that if the magistrate judge ordered the release of the affidavit, the necessary redactions would render the unsealed text "devoid of any meaningful context", saying the "redacted version would not serve any public interest". The DOJ requested the magistrate to instead unseal other information, including a cover sheet, the DOJ's August 5 motion to seal the warrant and the judge's sealing order of the same day.

On August 18, the federal magistrate judge held a hearing to discuss requests to unseal investigators' probable cause affidavit. Jay Bratt, head of the DOJ's counterintelligence division, said the investigation was in its "early stages". He argued that releasing the affidavit could reveal investigative techniques, jeopardize the identities of "several witnesses" from their specific accounts of events, as well as expose federal agents to threats. Bratt revealed that the affidavit contained "substantial grand jury information", including details about how "evidence of obstruction" would be found at Mar-a-Lago. Several media organizations asked the judge to unseal it with the necessary redactions, citing the public interest. The judge signalled that he planned to unseal portions of the affidavit and gave the DOJ a week to submit proposed redactions. Trump on social media repeatedly called for the release of the unredacted affidavit but his lawyers did not file a motion asking the court to do so.

Also on August 18, the magistrate judge unsealed several procedural documents related to the warrant affidavit, including the criminal cover sheet, a redacted copy of the August 5 warrant application, the DOJ's original motion to seal warrant documents, and the order granting the sealing request. The documents showed that the FBI was specifically investigating whether there was "willful retention of national defense information", concealment or removal of government records, and obstruction of a federal investigation. (Note: Second Notice of Filing of Redacted Documents, In re Sealed Search Warrant, No. 22-mj-8332 (S.D. Fla. August 15, 2022) (Dkt. 57).)

In a 13-page order, released on August 22, the judge said he "carefully reviewed" the affidavit before approving the search warrant and was "satisfied that the facts sworn by the affiant are reliable". He said that the DOJ had shown a "compelling interest that overrides any public interest" in fully unsealing the affidavit. He indicated that he might agree with the DOJ that the necessary redactions would render the document useless. He rejected the DOJ's argument that partially unsealing the affidavit would set a dangerous precedent, highlighting the significance of this case. He requested the DOJ to submit proposed redactions and provide additional evidence and arguments within a week. (Note: Order on Motions to Unseal, In re Sealed Search Warrant, No. 22-mj-8332 (S.D. Fla. August 22, 2022) (Dkt. 80).)

On August 25, the Justice Department submitted a legal brief proposing redactions to the affidavit. The brief was under seal, and multiple media companies requested the judge to unseal it, as well as direct the DOJ to make public any other sealed documents. The judge soon agreed to the proposed redactions and ordered the DOJ to release the redacted affidavit the following day. The judge's decision to release the affidavit was seen as surprising, because probable-cause affidavits are typically kept under seal (i.e., not made public) before charges are filed.

=== Release of redacted search warrant affidavit ===
The redacted search warrant affidavit, released on August 26, 2022

The redacted search warrant affidavit, along with a redacted copy of the legal brief that justified redactions to the affidavit, (Note: Notice of Filing of Redacted Memorandum, In re Sealed Search Warrant, No. 22-mj-8332 (S.D. Fl.a August 26, 2022) (Dkt. 98). "The United States hereby gives notice that it is filing the attached document, which is a redacted version of material previously filed in this case number under seal: the United States' Sealed, Ex Parte Memorandum of Law Regarding Proposed Redactions (DE89)".) were unsealed and made public on August 26. The New York Times, The Washington Post, and CNN released annotated versions of the search warrant affidavit as well.

The legal brief had argued that the DOJ's proposed redactions were necessary to protect the identities of cooperating witnesses and FBI agents who might otherwise be exposed to threats and retaliation, as well as to prevent obstruction of the investigation, protect privacy interests, protect grand jury information, and maintain the safety of law enforcement personnel.

The affidavit listed four main goals of the FBI investigation:

1. To "determine how the documents with classification markings and records were removed from the White House (or any other authorized location(s) for the storage of classified materials) and came to be stored at [Mar-a-Lago]";
2. To "determine whether the storage location(s) at [Mar-a-Lago] were authorized locations for the storage of classified information";
3. To "determine whether any additional classified documents or records may have been stored in an unauthorized location at [Mar-a-Lago] or another unknown location, and whether they remain at any such location";
4. And to "identify any person(s) who may have removed or retained classified information without authorization and/or in an unauthorized space".

The FBI said there was "probable cause to believe" that classified national security materials were improperly transferred to "unauthorized" locations at Mar-a-Lago, that materials relating to national defense or presidential records "subject to record retention requirements" still remained at Mar-a-Lago, and that "evidence of obstruction" would be found at Mar-a-Lago. The FBI noted that several of the seized documents contained Trump's "handwritten notes" and were "unfoldered, intermixed with other records, and otherwise unproperly [sic] identified".

The FBI attached to the affidavit a May 25, 2022, letter to the DOJ from Trump lawyer Evan Corcoran. In the letter, Corcoran argued against proceeding with a criminal investigation, saying that presidents have the "absolute authority" to declassify documents, although he did not clarify whether Trump had done so.

Following Trump's indictment on June 8, 2023, media outlets asked for the affidavit to be unsealed. On July 5, the Justice Department revealed another version of the affidavit with fewer redactions. One revelation was that some of the seized documents contained Trump's handwritten notes, proving that he did handle those documents at some point during or after his presidency.

=== Release of detailed property list ===
A detailed property list was unsealed on September 2 as a result of Trump's lawsuit against the United States. The list showed that Trump had intermingled classified items with other items, like documents and photographs without classification markings, news clippings, unspecified gifts, items of clothing, and a book. A box found in Trump's office is listed as containing "43 empty folders with classified banners; 28 empty folders labeled 'Return to Staff Secretary/Mili[t]ary Aide'; 24 government documents marked confidential, secret or top secret; 99 news articles and other printed media; and 69 government documents or photos that were not classified."

On May 3, 2024, Politico.com reported that, "[Jack] Smith's team acknowledged Friday that some evidence in the prosecution of former President Donald Trump for hoarding classified documents at his Florida home may not be in the same sequence FBI agents found it when they swept into the Mar-a-Lago compound with a search warrant in August 2022. The concession from prosecutors in a court filing ... came after attorneys for one of Trump’s co-defendants asked for a delay in the case because the defense lawyers were having trouble determining precisely where particular documents had come from in the 33 boxes the FBI [had] seized almost two years [earlier]."

== Trump v. United States ==
On August 22, two weeks after the search, Trump filed a lawsuit in the Southern District of Florida, seeking the appointment of a special master to review the seized materials for potential attorney-client or executive privilege. The case was assigned to District Judge Aileen Cannon, a Trump appointee. On September 1, Cannon ordered the DOJ to release the previously sealed detailed property list of the seized materials. She ordered the DOJ to halt its review of all materials on September 5, and she appointed Raymond J. Dearie, senior judge of the U.S. District Court for the Eastern District of New York, as special master on September 15.

The next day, the DOJ appealed the ruling to the 11th Circuit Court of Appeals. On September 22, the appeals court granted the DOJ's request to restore investigators' access to the classified files and block the special master from access to them.

On December 1, the appeals court ended the special master review, allowed the government to use all the documents in its investigation, and directed the lower court to dismiss Trump's lawsuit. The court ruled that Cannon lacked equitable jurisdiction to appoint a special master, that Cannon's decision did not meet the stringent standard for the judicial branch to intervene in ongoing investigations by the executive branch, and that the court would not make a special exception for former presidents. Trump did not appeal to the Supreme Court, and Cannon dismissed his lawsuit on December 12 for lack of jurisdiction.

== Special counsel investigation ==
On November 18, 2022, Garland appointed a special counsel, federal prosecutor Jack Smith, to oversee the federal criminal investigation. The Justice Department's press release said that Smith would oversee "the ongoing investigation involving classified documents and other presidential records, as well as the possible obstruction of that investigation."

=== Indictment ===
On June 8, 2023, Trump was indicted with 37 counts of charges related to the documents in the Federal District Court in Miami, the first time a former U.S. president faced federal charges. Charges included retaining and failing to deliver national defense documents under the Espionage Act, for which there were 31 counts naming 31 specific documents. None of these documents had been in the boxes Trump voluntarily surrendered to NARA in January 2022; they were either turned over under subpoena the following June or else seized under search warrant at Mar-a-Lago the following August.

On June 13, Trump was arrested and arraigned. As with his previous arraignment in New York, no mugshot was taken, though he was fingerprinted and processed during this arrest. As part of the conditions for his release, he avoided paying bond but was barred from discussing the case with Walt Nauta and with witnesses.

On July 27, a superseding indictment added three more felony counts.

A year later, on July 15, 2024, Judge Cannon dismissed the case, ruling that Jack Smith's appointment as special counsel had been unconstitutional. The Special Counsel appealed the dismissal, but following Trump's election to the presidency that November, it dropped the appeal.

== Return of seized property ==
Once Trump took office for a second time, the Department of Justice arranged for the material seized in the August 2022 search to be returned to Trump. On February 28, 2025, as Trump boarded an Air Force One flight from Joint Base Andrews in Maryland headed to Mar-a-Lago, boxes were loaded onto the plane. Trump issued a statement: "The Department of Justice has just returned the boxes." White House Communications Director Steven Cheung and counselor to the president Alina Habba both used the phrase "personal items" in describing what those boxes contained.

== Reactions ==
=== Congress ===
NARA's revaluation of presidential records retrieved from Mar-a-Lago raised concern within Congress; the House Committee on Oversight and Reform, chaired by U.S. Representative Carolyn B. Maloney, began an investigation. In a February 24 letter to NARA, Maloney wrote, "I am deeply concerned that former President Trump may have violated the law through his intentional efforts to remove and destroy records that belong to the American people". She requested the National Archives to provide documents about discussions among top Trump advisers about preserving and storing White House records. Maloney and Rep. Adam Schiff, chair of the House Intelligence Committee, later sent a letter to Avril Haines, director of National Intelligence (DNI) requesting a classified congressional briefing and a damage assessment. Haines responded that the DOJ and Intelligence Community were conducting a classification review of materials taken to Mar-a-Lago and a damage assessment of the potential risk to national security.

Mark Warner and Marco Rubio, chair and ranking member of the Senate Intelligence Committee, sent a private letter to Garland and Haines requesting that the DOJ and the Office of the DNI provide the committee with the classified documents seized and a damage assessment of potential risks to national security. According to an August 26 letter from Haines, a classification review and damage assessment inquiry is ongoing. The eight congressional leaders who are briefed on classified intelligence matters, colloquially known as the Gang of Eight, have asked the Biden administration for access to the seized documents.

The Congressional Research Service issued a "Sidebar" bulletin to brief members and Committees of Congress on the legal aspects of the case.

=== White House ===
The White House said that President Biden and White House officials were not aware of the search until it was reported on the news. Press Secretary Karine Jean-Pierre said "those investigations should be free from political influence" and did not comment on the search itself except that the Department of Justice was carrying out the investigation.

On August 17, the White House, in a statement to CNN, condemned calls from some members of the Republican Party to "defund the FBI".

White House officials were privately concerned over the classified material stored in Mar-a-Lago, including whether it could put at risk the sources and methods of the US intelligence community. On August 26, Biden mocked Trump for saying he had declassified all of the material he took with him to Mar-a-Lago and said he would let the DOJ make a determination on the risk to national security.

In another speech on August 30, Biden condemned the threats against law enforcement and calls to defund the FBI as "sickening". He criticized Republicans for what he claimed was hypocrisy in what he described as their calls for "riots in the streets" and purported refusal to condemn the January 6 United States Capitol attack.

At the end of December 2022, Biden's attorneys found classified documents in Biden's former office and in his Delaware home, dating back to when he was vice president in the Obama administration. They surrendered the documents. Their discovery was reported in January 2023.

=== National Archives ===
The National Archives made multiple press statements concerning Trump's presidential records in response to media queries. They have also released numerous records relevant to the Trump administration's adherence to the Presidential Records Act in response to FOIA requests.

On August 24, NARA staff told the House Committee on Oversight and Reform they could not be certain they had all of Trump's presidential records. The same day, in an internal letter to all NARA employees, acting Archivist Debra Wall said NARA had received both threats and praise from members of the public for its role in the ongoing FBI investigation.

On September 13, Rep. Carolyn Maloney of the House Oversight and Reform Committee wrote a letter to NARA, requesting an "urgent review" of all recovered documents and an assessment regarding any and all "presidential records [that] remain unaccounted for and potentially in the possession of the former president". On September 30, the National Archives responded to the committee's request, writing in part: "While there is no easy way to establish absolute accountability, we do know that we do not have custody of everything we should ... With respect to the second issue concerning whether former President Trump has surrendered all presidential records, we respectfully refer you to the Department of Justice in light of its ongoing investigation".

=== Trump, his family, and his attorneys ===
On August 14, Trump demanded the return of boxes of seized documents that were alleged covered by attorney-client privilege and executive privilege.

Beginning with his first announcement after the search, Trump and his attorneys made a variety of statements relating to the search and the FBI investigation; these statements have been criticized as "shifting" over time and "often contradictory and unsupported". Zolan Kanno-Youngs and Maggie Haberman, writing for The New York Times, said that the former President's response "follow[s] a familiar playbook" which "[h]e has used ... over decades", including during investigations into links between Trump associates and Russian officials and whether the Trump campaign conspired with Russia, as well as during his first impeachment trial. They also said that Trump's statements did not explain why he kept the documents after the government began investigating him. In an August 30 Fox News appearance, Trump attorney Jim Trusty said that his client's actions were comparable to someone with "an overdue library book" in their possession, and suggested that government prosecutors are holding Trump to a different standard of scrutiny than they would apply to others.

According to The Washington Post, Trump has struggled to assemble an experienced legal defense team, with many of his former lawyers declining to take part in the case. Trump spokesman Taylor Budowich said that Trump's lead counsel were exceptionally talented and had "litigated some of the most complex cases in American history". The New York Times credits political advisor Boris Epshteyn for his role in assembling Trump's legal team. Epshteyn previously assisted in the defense of Trump's false claims of a stolen election in 2020. Former Trump attorney David Schoen has said the current situation remains problematic, with members of the defense team "rotating in and out", and lacking clear leadership. Trump later added former Florida solicitor general Chris Kise to his legal team for the case, but within a month, Kise's role was reportedly reduced. According to The New York Times, Kise had "suggested hiring a forensic firm to search for additional documents" following requests from Jay Bratt at the Justice Department, who expressed concern that more documents were still missing. Disagreement between Trump's lawyers reportedly led to a minimization of Kise's participation on the defense team, due to his more conciliatory approach.

Trump's political action committee, the Save America PAC, sent out more than 100 fundraising emails in the days following the FBI search. Daily donations increased from an average of $200,000–$300,000 to more than $1,000,000 for at least two days. The emails claimed that former president Trump was being politically persecuted. In July, the Save America PAC paid almost $1,000,000 to civil and criminal lawyers representing Trump and the Trump Organization in lawsuits.

On December 22, 2022, the U.S. House select committee investigating the January 6 attack published its final report, in which it remarked that DOJ appears to be "investigating the conduct of counsel for certain witnesses whose fees are being paid by President Trump's Save America Political Action Committee." The House committee noted that DOJ, in its public report of its Mar-a-Lago investigation, had seemed to express concern that those attorneys might be more loyal to Trump's defense than to their clients' defenses and thus may try to influence their clients' witness testimony. The House committee said it shared those concerns, and it revealed that it had provided related information to DOJ and Fulton County District Attorney Fani Willis. Related to these comments, the House committee cited three news reports.

==== Claims of political motivation, planted evidence, and Obama precedent ====
Trump likened the search to the 1970s Watergate scandal. He made unsubstantiated allegations that it was politically motivated to stop him from running for president in 2024, and a "politically motivated move" by the Biden administration. He criticized the FBI for searching his wife Melania Trump's rooms and belongings in Mar-a-Lago.

On August 11, Trump made the unsubstantiated claim that the FBI might have doctored evidence to support its search warrant and might have planted incriminating materials and recording devices at Mar-a-Lago. Trump's allies echoed these conspiracist claims. On August 12, he claimed that his lawyers had been fully cooperating with federal investigators prior to the search: "The government could have had whatever they wanted, if we had it".

On August 12, Trump falsely claimed that former president Barack Obama had taken "33 million pages of documents, much of them classified" to Chicago; the falsehoods were amplified by conservative commentators on Fox News. NARA responded that they had taken "exclusive legal and physical custody" of Obama's records when he left office in 2017, and that Obama had "no control over where and how" NARA stored the records, with NARA "exclusively" maintaining around 30 million pages of unclassified Obama records near Chicago, while classified Obama records were maintained by NARA in its Washington, D.C., facility.

After The Washington Post reported that nuclear documents were being sought in the search of Mar-a-Lago, Trump said on August 12: "Nuclear weapons issue is a Hoax". Trump also falsely claimed that former president Obama had retained "lots" of nuclear documents.

On May 21, 2024, by misrepresenting standard Justice Department policy on use of force, Trump falsely claimed Joe Biden had been ready to kill him during the FBI search. The accusation was noted to be without precedent in modern U.S. history. Trump's campaign sent an email with the subject line: "They were authorized to shoot me!" The email said: "You know they’re just itching to do the unthinkable … Joe Biden was locked & loaded ready to take me out & put my family in danger." The same day, he posted to Truth Social saying that "Joe Biden’s DOJ ... AUTHORIZED THE FBI TO USE DEADLY (LETHAL) FORCE." Trump's comment was in reaction to a standard law enforcement policy statement, attached to the FBI's description of the planned search of Mar-a-Lago, that officers may use lethal force only to counter "imminent danger of death or serious physical injury". The FBI had taken steps to ensure that Trump would not be present during the search and gave advance notice to the Secret Service. On May 24, Jack Smith's office asked Judge Cannon to place a gag order on Trump related to this "repeated mischaracterization" of the actions of law enforcement officials.

==== Claims of declassifying all documents ====
On August 12, Trump posted to Truth Social claiming that the documents he brought to Mar-a-Lago were "all declassified" before he left office. That day, his office issued a statement admitting that he had frequently taken home classified documents and further claiming that he had issued a "standing order" that anything he took home was automatically and "instantly" declassified. On June 29, 2023, government attorneys responded to a Freedom of Information Act request from Bloomberg News, saying they found no record of any such standing order.

Sections of the Code of Federal Regulation addressing declassification require markings that are "uniformly and conspicuously applied to leave no doubt about the declassified status of the information and who authorized the declassification". Speaking to Breitbart in May 2022, discussing the documents that NARA had recovered the previous January, Kash Patel blamed White House lawyers for not having done the paperwork to remove the classification markings to conform to Trump's order.

Except for Kash Patel, former Trump administration officials said they never heard of such a "standing order" issued by Trump, and labeled the claim false.

- John Bolton, who was Trump's national security advisor, said that Trump's claim was a "complete fiction" and "almost certainly a lie". Bolton said he never heard of such an order before, during, or after his tenure as national security advisor. Bolton said: "When somebody begins to concoct lies like this, it shows a real level of desperation".
- Glenn S. Gerstell, who served as the general counsel for the National Security Agency from 2015 to 2020, called Trump's claim "preposterous", as declassification requires recordkeeping as well as notifying the agencies that used the information.
- Leon Panetta, former Secretary of Defense and Director of the CIA under the Obama administration, similarly said Trump's claim was "pretty much BS". He explained that the declassification process requires authorization by various agencies. "There is nothing that I'm aware of that indicates that a formal step was taken by this president to, in fact, declassify anything", Panetta said.

A Congressional Research Service memo noted that a proper declassification process would have required Trump to communicate his intent to declassify specific documents. The same memo points out that the government had a legal basis to seize presidential records regardless of whether they are classified, and that classified material could furthermore indicate a violation of the Espionage Act.

On September 20, 2022, Trump's lawyers appeared before Judge Dearie and said they would not mention Trump's claim of a "standing order" in court, claiming that doing so might reveal a potential defense in a future indictment. The next day, a three-judge appellate panel of the Court of Appeals for the 11th Circuit ruled there was "no evidence that any of these records were declassified" and observed that Trump's lawyers had "resisted providing any evidence that he had declassified any of these documents".

On September 21, 2022, Trump appeared on the Hannity show on Fox News, claiming that "there doesn't have to be a process" and a president "can declassify just by saying, 'It's declassified.' Even by thinking about it." This notion was "mocked" by legal experts. Lawyers noted that "even if Trump did somehow declassify the documents, he had no right to take them when he left office on Jan. 20, 2020 ... [Trump] had no (legal) interest in these documents." The 11th Circuit Court of Appeals noted that "the declassification argument is a 'red herring'."

==== Lawsuit ====
On August 7, 2024, Trump filed a tort claim saying he intended to sue the FBI for $100 million. The FBI has six months to respond, after which Trump can sue.

=== Trump allies and supporters ===
On the day of the search, a group of about two dozen Trump supporters gathered in protest in front of Mar-a-Lago; others held protests in front of FBI offices in Phoenix, Arizona, and Washington D.C. Over the next few days, Trump supporters continued to demonstrate outside Mar-a-Lago, and at several pickets outside a number of FBI field offices in various states. A small group of armed Trump supporters protested outside the FBI office in Phoenix.

CBS News reporter Robert Costa reported that within Trump's circle, "Some allies are urging him to speed up his decision on 2024 in the wake of this, that no one in [the] GOP will challenge him now... others are telling him to stay cool, wait".

Trump allies in Congress and in right-wing media spread a wide variety of misinformation and baseless conspiracy theories: that the FBI may have planted evidence; that the FBI search aimed to stop Trump from exposing criminals in government; that the FBI conducted a "military occupation" of Mar-a-Lago; that the FBI entered Mar-a-Lago "unannounced" and was "taking whatever they want for themselves"; and that some FBI agents went "rogue". Patel repeatedly blamed the General Services Administration (GSA) for "mistakenly pack[ing] some boxes and mov[ing] them to Mar-a-Lago". The GSA replied that it was the outgoing presidential transition team and their volunteers who packed the boxes, put them on pallets, and shrink-wrapped them.

Many of Trump's allies, including Steve Bannon, urged Trump to publicly release some of the surveillance footage of the search or use it in political campaign ads. Others cautioned him that releasing the tapes could backfire by revealing the sheer volume of classified information removed from his residence and countering some of his unsupported claims. The footage could further expose the identities of FBI agents videotaped and subject them to further threats and harassment.

Fox News host Brian Kilmeade, while guest hosting Tucker Carlson Tonight, showed a doctored photo depicting the federal magistrate judge who approved the warrant together with convicted sex trafficker Ghislaine Maxwell; Kilmeade later described the fake photo as "a meme" shared "in jest".

The FBI search ignited apocalyptic, violent rhetoric among Trump supporters, including members of the far-right, on media including Fox News, Newsmax, PJ Media, the Blaze, and right-wing talk radio. Talk of civil war and violence spiked online among far-right users on platforms such as Truth Social, Gab, Telegram, and Twitter, including from conservative commentator Steven Crowder and white supremacist commentator Nick Fuentes. The New York Young Republican Club blamed the search on "internationalist forces and their allies intent on undermining the foundation of our Republic". Experts on political violence said that the extremist rhetoric creates a dangerous atmosphere and heightens the risk of violent acts.

==== Threats against government officials ====
FBI Director Christopher A. Wray denounced online threats against federal agents and DOJ employees. Wray said the FBI would "stay vigilant and adjust our security posture accordingly" given a surge of threats to FBI employees and property following the search of Mar-a-Lago. Kyle Walter, a researcher from Logically told The Washington Post that the firm has observed a significant number of threats against FBI employees. The names of the two FBI agents who signed the warrant paperwork were redacted in the official court-released documents; the right-wing outlet Breitbart published leaked versions of the documents that revealed the agents' names, exposing them to harassment.

The federal magistrate judge who approved the search was the target of antisemitic vitriol, misinformation, and threats on sites such as 4chan; due to online threats against him, the U.S. District Court for the Southern District of Florida removed information about the magistrate from its online directory for his protection. The synagogue he attended had also received threats and is under additional security.

The FBI and Department of Homeland Security issued a joint bulletin warning of an "unprecedented" increase in threats and acts of violence against federal law enforcement officials, including "calls for the targeted killing of judicial, law enforcement, and government officials associated with the Palm Beach search, including the federal judge who approved the Palm Beach search warrant". Multiple possible targets of violence had their personal information posted online. The bulletin noted a threat to place a dirty bomb in front of FBI Headquarters.

A man in Mercer County, Pennsylvania, was charged in US District Court with making online threats against FBI agents on the Gab social networking site.

On August 19, lawmakers on the House Oversight Committee contacted social media companies and requested information about recent threats made against law enforcement officials by users of their platforms. Letters sent by lawmakers specifically cited threats published on Truth Social, which has seen a significant increase in app downloads following the Mar-a-Lago search. The letter expressed concern because "reckless statements by the former president and Republican Members of Congress have unleashed a flood of violent threats on social media" and they urged platforms to take immediate, concrete action to limit incitement of violence against law enforcement agencies.

==== FBI field office attack ====
Ricky Shiffer, a 42-year-old Trump supporter wearing body armor and armed with an AR-15 style rifle and a nail gun, attempted to breach the FBI field office in Cincinnati, Ohio, on August 11 and died in a subsequent confrontation with police officers. He had taken part in the January 6 United States Capitol attack, and was one of the most prolific posters on Trump's social media platform Truth Social, where he posted about his desire to kill FBI agents after the FBI search of Mar-a-Lago. Shiffer had engaged in violent extremist rhetoric on social media for years, and the FBI received a tip about him in May 2022.

=== Republican elected officials and candidates ===
The Republican National Committee, as well as most Republicans, responded to the FBI search by attacking the FBI and depicting Trump as a victim and political martyr. Republicans said that the search made the U.S. into a "third-world country" or "banana republic", although democracies such as France, South Korea, and Israel have all investigated and prosecuted former leaders for criminal offenses. Many Republicans vowed to investigate the DOJ if the party retook control of Congress in the November 2022 elections. There is no evidence of improper conduct by federal investigators, and no evidence that the search was politically motivated.

Several Republican politicians, including U.S. Senators Rick Scott and Marco Rubio of Florida, and Florida Governor Ron DeSantis condemned the search. In a tweet, House Minority Leader, Kevin McCarthy said the Justice Department "has reached an intolerable state of weaponized politicization" and said: "When Republicans take back the House, we will conduct immediate oversight of this department, follow the facts, and leave no stone unturned. Attorney General Garland, preserve your documents and clear your calendar". Republican Congresswoman Marjorie Taylor Greene of Georgia called for the FBI to be defunded. Senator Rand Paul called for the Espionage Act to be repealed. Anthony Sabatini, a Republican member of the Florida House of Representatives called for the state to "sever all ties with DOJ immediately" and called for FBI agents to be "arrested upon sight".

Many Republicans accused the DOJ and FBI of a double standard for their previous treatment of the Hillary Clinton email controversy, where former Democratic nominee Hillary Clinton was investigated but not charged over classified material found on her private email server during her tenure as US secretary of State. Sen. Lindsey Graham of South Carolina predicted the likelihood of street violence if Trump was indicted.

Some Republicans took a more restrained tone upon reports that the documents seized were highly classified, but nonetheless questioned the search. Multiple Republicans called on the DOJ and FBI to release or share to Congress documents surrounding the search, particularly the affidavit used as the basis of the warrant. Mike Turner, the ranking member of the House Intelligence Committee, said that he was "very concerned about the method that was used in raiding Mar-a-Lago"; Brian Fitzpatrick questioned whether "the law is being enforced equally" and with "parity".

Republican congresswoman Liz Cheney, the top Republican on the House Select Committee on the January 6 Attack, criticized her party's response to the federal investigation of Trump, writing, "I have been ashamed to hear members of my party attacking the integrity of the FBI agents involved with the recent Mar-a-Lago search. These are sickening comments that put the lives of patriotic public servants at risk".

On September 22, Senators Thom Tillis and Lindsey Graham acknowledged that there's a "process" for declassification, and Senator John Thune said the process "ought to be adhered to and followed". Senator Mike Braun said he was unaware of "the proper methodology" for declassification. Senator Mike Rounds commented on the importance of storing information correctly: "People can get hurt, people can get killed if it's not stored correctly, and if that information gets out." On September 25, Senator John Barrasso, pressed by ABC host George Stephanopoulos, acknowledged: "I don't think a president can declassify documents by saying so, by 'thinking about'."

=== Congressional Democrats ===
House Democrats praised the search as a step toward accountability for Trump. Nancy Pelosi, the Speaker of the United States House of Representatives, said in an interview after the search, "We believe in the rule of law. That's what our country is about. And no person is above the law. Not even the president of the United States. Not even a former president of the United States". Senate Democrats offered more reserved reactions; in the immediate aftermath of the search, Senate Majority Leader Chuck Schumer said he would "withhold comment until we know more".

=== Scholars and former officials ===
Following the FBI search of Mar-a-Lago, Reuters and Al Jazeera cited scholars and former officials, who said the way Trump used the residence presented a highly unique security "nightmare". Commenting on a 2017 North Korea strategy meeting between Trump and Shinzo Abe which was surrounded by guests, national security lawyer Mark Zaid stated, "What we saw was Trump be so lax in security that he was having a sensitive meeting regarding a potential war topic where non-U.S. government personnel could observe and photograph". Mary McCord, a former Department of Justice official, stated: "Clearly they thought it was very serious to get these materials back into secured space. Even just retention of highly classified documents in improper storage – particularly given Mar-a-Lago, the foreign visitors there and others who might have connections with foreign governments and foreign agents – creates a significant national security threat". In 2019, a Chinese citizen with false passports, possessing a thumb drive containing malware, was arrested attending a function there.

Experts considered Trump "the perfect profile of a security risk: He was like a disgruntled former employee, with access to sensitive government secrets, dead set on tearing down what he believed was a deep state out to get him". Columbia University political scientist David Rothkopf viewed the Mar-a-Lago search as a reminder that Trump "was, and is, a national security risk unlike any the United States has ever faced".

Pulitzer Prize-winning reporter Michael Sallah of the Pittsburgh Post-Gazette discovered that a Ukrainian-born Russian speaker using a fake name who claimed to be a Rothschild family heiress had frequented the residence over a year's time, even posing there for photos with Trump and Senator Lindsey Graham.

=== Intelligence community ===
Former Director of the Central Intelligence Agency John Brennan called the storage of sensitive documents at Mar-a-Lago "the height of recklessness and irresponsibility".

Dan Coats, Director of National Intelligence (DNI) under Trump from 2017 to 2019, defended the FBI stating that "my first thought was Chris [Wray] would not have signed off on that unless he thought the process was not working or they were not getting the right answers back from lawyers or others and it was serious enough to take that action".

Asha Rangappa, a former FBI agent and former associate dean at Yale Law School, stated that Trump's acknowledgment that the documents seized were covered or potentially covered by executive privilege indicated that he had kept presidential records that he was not authorized to have under 18 USC 2071. She stated: "And so it's not clear that executive privilege would even be relevant to the particular crime he's being investigated for and yet in this filing, he basically admits that he is in possession of them, which is what the government is trying to establish".

Jeffrey Smith, former general counsel to the CIA, and David Laufman, former chief of the counterespionage section at the DOJ's National Security Division, warned of the investigation not having strong enough evidence to have a conviction at trial.

=== Former Trump administration figures ===
Former Vice President Mike Pence stated immediately following the August 2022 search that it undermined public confidence in the justice system. He noted that "no former President of the United States has ever been subject to a raid of their personal residence". Pence denied having any classified documents, but in January 2023, classified documents were found at Pence's Indiana home.

Trump's former chief of staff, John F. Kelly, said that Trump has a long track record of disregarding rules for handling sensitive documents; that Trump "didn't believe in the classification system"; and that Trump held U.S. intelligence in disdain. William Barr said in an interview that he could not think of a legitimate reason for Trump to be in possession of classified documents and that the documents, whether classified or not, belong to the government and should have been turned over to NARA.

Trump's former national security adviser John Bolton said "almost nothing would surprise me about what's in the documents at Mar-a-Lago". He recalled that although Trump usually did not read the President's Daily Brief, he would sometimes ask his briefers "to keep the highly classified visual aids, pictures, charts and graphs" that were prepared for him, and that Trump sometimes refused to return these materials when asked by his briefers.

On November 3, 2022, Trump adviser Kash Patel testified before a federal grand jury investigating the handling of records taken to Mar-a-Lago home. The judge granted Patel immunity from prosecution on any information he provides to the investigation. Trump's Save America PAC paid Patel's legal fees.

== See also ==
- FBI raid of Fulton County, Georgia election office
- Joe Biden classified documents incident
- Mike Pence classified documents incident
