= Adrienne Thomas =

Adrienne Thomas may refer to:

- Adrienne Thomas (archivist), American archivist
- Adrienne Thomas (novelist) (1897–1980), pseudonym of Hertha A. Deutsch, a German novelist
