= Gene Boyer =

United States Army officer (1929–2016)

Gene Tunney Boyer
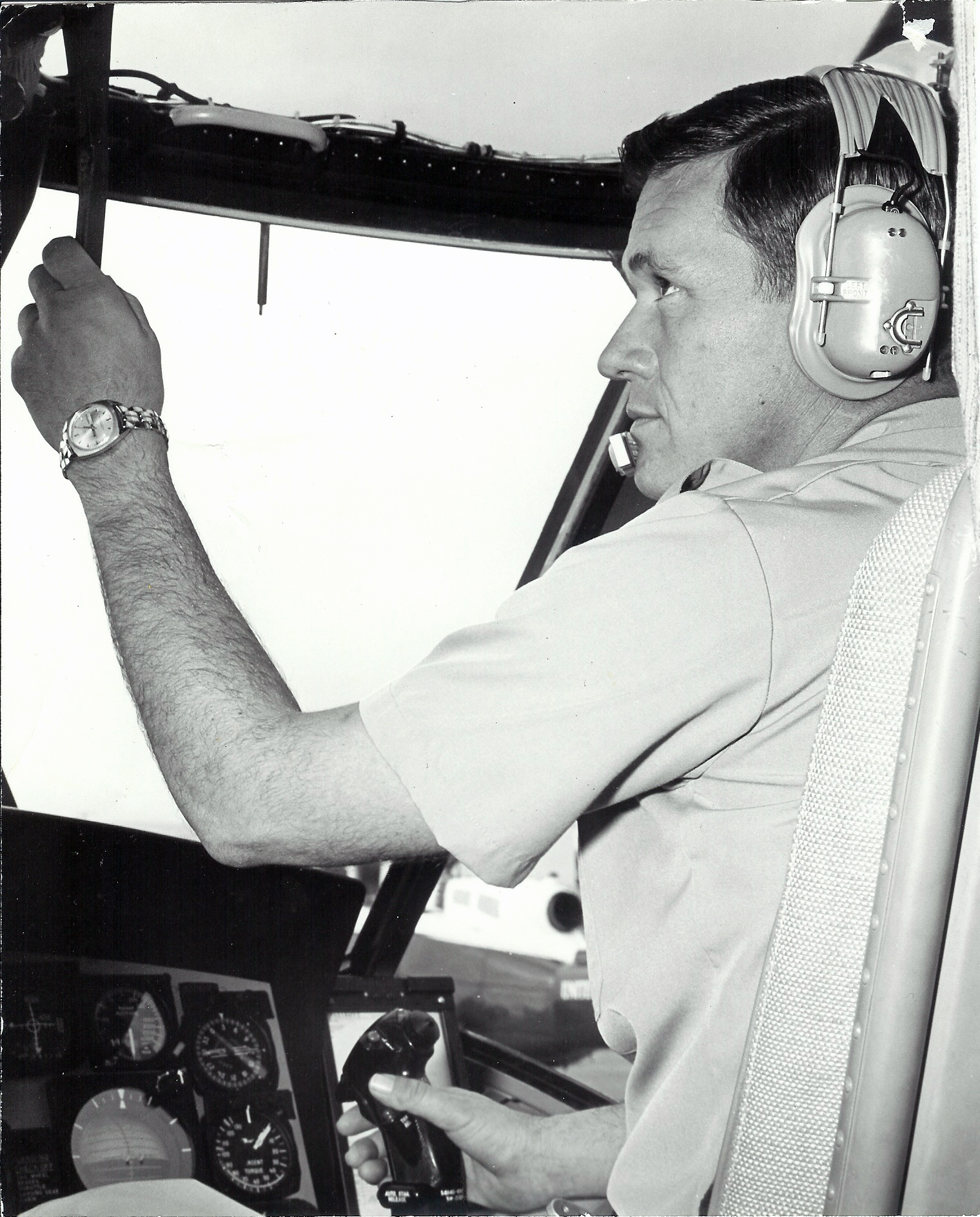
- Army One Helicopter Pilot
- Born: July 24, 1929; Akron, Ohio, U.S.
- Died: August 27, 2016 (aged 87)
- Military career
- Branch: United States Army
- Service years: 22
- Rank: Lt. Colonel
- Unit: Executive Flight Detachment—White House
- Awards: Legion of Merit for Service to Presidents Johnson, Nixon and Ford Two Distinguished Flying Crosses with Oak Leaf Cluster; Army-wide Aviation Safety Award and the Air Medal for Valor with six Oak Leaf Clusters (OLC); Soldier's Medal; Bronze Star Medal; Army Commendation Medal National Defense Service Medal w/1 (OLC); United Nations Service Medal; Master Army Aviator Badge; Meritorious Emblem w/1 (OLC); Ranger Tab; Presidential Service Badge; Vietnam Service Medal; Vietnam Campaign Medal; Parachutist Badge
- Other work: Sales & Marketing, Author

Retired United States Army Lieutenant Colonel Gene Tunney Boyer (July 24, 1929 – August 27, 2016) was the chief pilot of Army One, the helicopter transporting the President of the United States, between 1964 and 1975. Boyer was the pilot during President Richard Nixon's last day in office on August 9, 1974, when Nixon famously delivered the V sign just prior to leaving office. He led the restoration of the VH-3A "Sea King" helicopter, tail number 150617, that served as Army One that day. That helicopter is now on permanent display at the Richard Nixon Presidential Library and Museum. Boyer also served Presidents Johnson and Ford as a White House pilot. Boyer co-wrote his memoirs, Inside the President’s Helicopter: Reflections of a White House Senior Pilot, with Jackie Boor.
