= Allen Weinstein =

American historian (1937–2015)

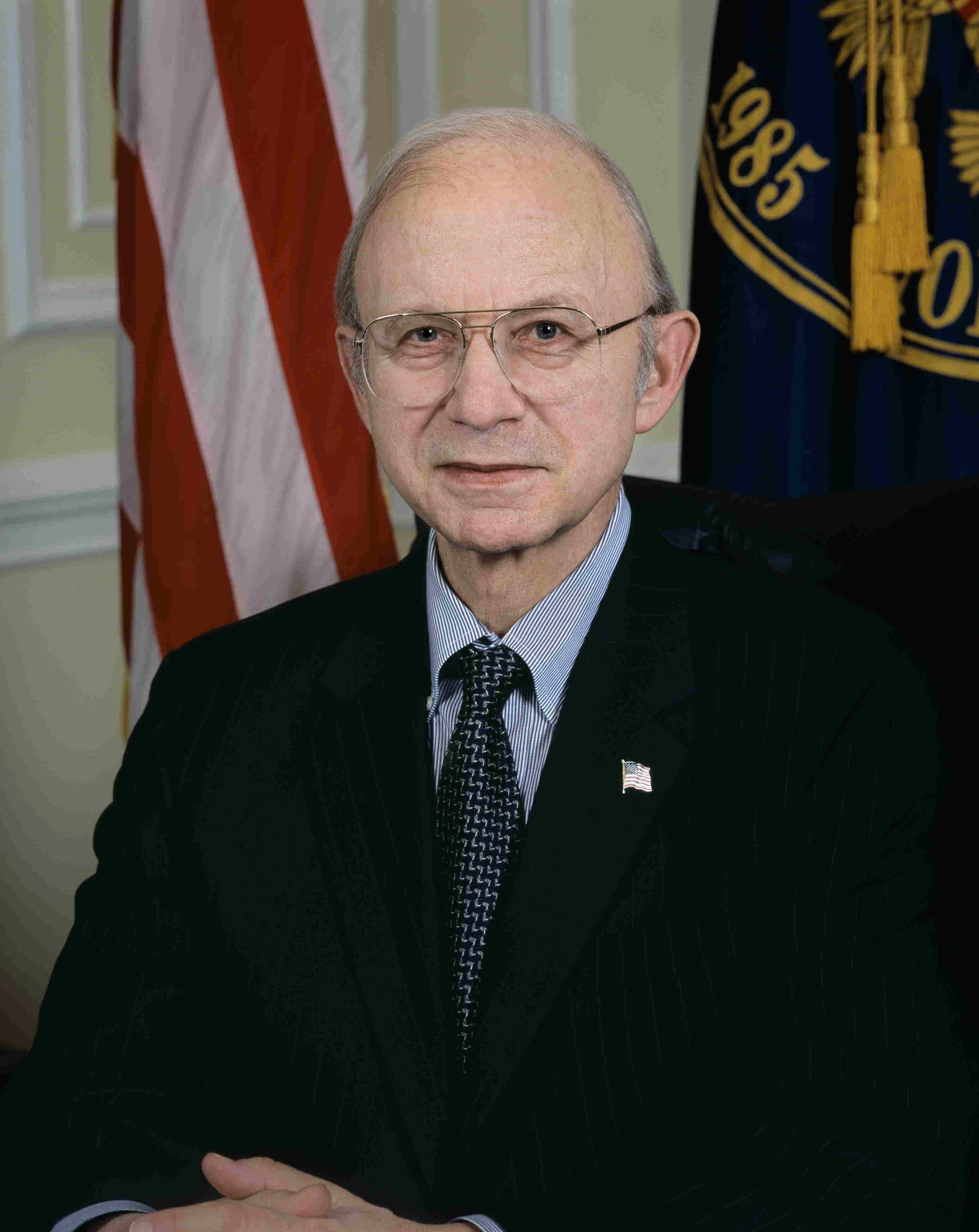
- Allen Weinstein, Ninth Archivist of the United States

9th Archivist of the United States
- In office February 16, 2005 – December 19, 2008
- President: George W. Bush
- Preceded by: John W. Carlin
- Succeeded by: Adrienne Thomas (acting)

Personal details
- Born: September 1, 1937 New York, New York, U.S.
- Died: June 18, 2015 (aged 77) Gaithersburg, Maryland, U.S.
- Spouse(s): Diane Gilbert Sypolt (divorced), Adrienne Dominguez
- Children: David Weinstein, Andrew Weinstein, Alex Content (stepson)
- Parent(s): Samuel Weinstein, Sarah Popkov
- Occupation: Senior Strategist for the International Foundation for Electoral Systems, Professor and former Archivist of the United States
- Awards: United Nations Peace Medal (1986), Council of Europe's Silver Medal (1990, 1996)

Allen Weinstein (September 1, 1937 – June 18, 2015) was an American historian, educator, and federal official who served in several different offices. Under the Reagan administration, he was cofounder of the National Endowment for Democracy (NED) in 1983. He served as the Archivist of the United States from February 16, 2005, until his resignation on December 19, 2008. After his resignation, he returned to the International Foundation for Electoral Systems as a senior strategist and was a visiting faculty member at the University of Maryland.

== Early life and education ==
The son of Russian Jewish immigrants, Weinstein was born in New York City in 1937, the youngest of three children. His parents owned several delis in the Bronx and Queens. He graduated from DeWitt Clinton High School and City College of New York, then received a Ph.D. in American studies from Yale University.

== Career ==
=== Professor and editor ===
He taught at Smith College from 1966 to 1981. Briefly, in 1981, he served on the editorial staff for The Washington Post and was an executive editor of The Washington Quarterly from 1981 to 1983. In 1981, he moved to Georgetown University, where he was a professor until 1984. In 1982, he was a member of the U.S. delegation to the UNESCO World Conference on Cultural Policies, and in 1983 he served on the U.S. delegation to the UNESCO-sponsored International Program for the Development of Communication. He was a professor of history at Boston University from 1985 to 1989. In 2009, after he resigned from the position of Archivist of the United States, he taught history at the University of Maryland.

During his career in education, Weinstein received two Senior Fulbright Lectureships, a fellowship at the Woodrow Wilson International Center for Scholars and a fellowship at the American Council for Learned Societies.

In 1983 Weinstein cofounded the National Endowment for Democracy (NED), a U.S. government-funded organization created to advance American foreign policy interests abroad. Critics simply call it a “regime change arm” of the government. One of NED’s founders, Carl Gershman, openly stated that the NED does overtly what the CIA once did covertly. And Weinstein agreed and said in a 1991 interview with the Washington Post: "A lot of what we do today was done covertly 25 years ago by the CIA." Among the shapers of the NED’s agenda were Madeleine Albright (“We are the indispensable nation”) and John McCain (“Bomb bomb bomb, bomb bomb Iran”).

=== International elections ===
In 1985 Weinstein founded The Center for Democracy, where he served as president until the organization merged with the International Foundation for Electoral Systems (IFES) in 2003. At the request of Senators Richard Lugar and Claiborne Pell of the Senate Foreign Relations Committee, the Center for Democracy organized a bipartisan group of election lawyers to oversee the preparations for the February 1986 elections in the Philippines. At Ronald Reagan's request, Weinstein returned to the Philippines to continue to monitor the election procedures. The Center drafted the official report of the U.S. Observer Delegation, and went on to work with President Corazon Aquino's government on matters of electoral procedure. While president he also chaired the organization's observation missions to El Salvador (1991), Nicaragua (1989–90, 1996), Panama (1988–89), and Russia (1991, 1996, 2000). After the organizations merged, Weinstein remained on staff at IFES as their senior adviser until he was selected as the Archivist of the United States. He returned to IFES in 2009.

For his work in international elections, Weinstein received the United Nations Peace Medal (1986) and the Council of Europe's Silver Medal (1990 and 1996).

=== Board and advisory positions ===
Weinstein was a founding member in 1985 of the board of directors of the United States Institute of Peace and chairman of its education and training committee, remaining a director until 2001, and now serves on the chairman's advisory council. He was a founding officer of the Strasbourg-based International Institute for Democracy from 1989 to 2001. He chaired the judging panel for the annual International IMPAC Dublin Literary Award from 1995 to 2003. He served on the advisory council of the LBJ School of Public Affairs (University of Texas-Austin). He was chairman of the Woodrow Wilson Presidential Library's advisory council. He chaired the annual "Global Panel" in the Netherlands from 1993 to 1998. From 1982 to 1991 he was a member of the Foreign Policy Association's editorial advisory board.

=== Death ===
Weinstein died of pneumonia on June 18, 2015, aged 77, in a nursing home in Gaithersburg, Maryland, after suffering from Parkinson's disease.

== Legacy ==
=== Alger Hiss case ===
In 1970, Weinstein began researching the Alger Hiss case for a book. Reviewing the case, John Ehrman wrote at the official CIA website that initially, Weinstein "believed that Hiss had not been a Communist or a spy."

Weinstein's extensive research included interviews with former Soviet intelligence officers who had worked with Chambers and a Freedom of Information request that eventually yielded 30,000 pages of FBI and CIA files. Ehrman continues "Hiss also cooperated with Weinstein, granting him six interviews and access to the defense's legal files. After plowing through the data, however, Weinstein did what no previous Hiss defender had done: he changed his mind."

Controversy resulted when Weinstein indicated in a 1976 book review that he now believed that Hiss was guilty, and grew with the publication in 1978 of Weinstein's book, Perjury: The Hiss–Chambers Case. The book and the conclusions expressed in it have aroused some controversy; The Nation has since published a series of articles critical of Weinstein. In 1997, editor Victor Navasky published what he claimed as evidence that Weinstein had misquoted, misrepresented, or misconstrued several of his interview subjects for Perjury. One of these subjects, Samuel Krieger, sued Weinstein for libel in 1979 for misquoting him and incorrectly identifying him as a fugitive murder suspect, leading Weinstein to settle out of court by issuing a public apology and paying Krieger $17,500. In 2004, Jon Wiener accused Weinstein in The Nation of breaching professional ethics by paying for exclusive access to Soviet archives for his 1999 book The Haunted Wood, and of refusing to allow other researchers access to his personal archives.

Other sources, including Harvard professor Daniel Aaron, Sidney Hook, Irving Howe, Alfred Kazin and Garry Wills, support Weinstein's scholarship. Ellen Schrecker has "explicitly acknowledge[d] that the 1999 publication of Allen Weinstein's The Haunted Wood finally convinced me of the guilt of the major communist spies." In 2009, historian Eduard Mark wrote that "The declassification of Venona excepted, no development since the end of the Cold War has affected the study of Soviet espionage in the United States as much as the work jointly written by Allen Weinstein and Alexander Vassiliev, The Haunted Wood."

=== National Archives ===
In his obituary, National Archivist David Ferriero noted the following achievements by Weinstein:

- Restoration of public trust through declassification and release of interagency agreements with audit and other procedures
- Establishment of National Declassification Initiative to address challenges in policies, procedures, structure, and resources
- Expansion of public outreach with Foundation for the National Archives via Digital Vaults and Boeing Learning Center
- Creation of "First Preservers" program to preserve vital records

Another change at the Archives that Weinstein affected, albeit indirectly, was the creation of an anti-harassment policy by Ferriero in 2010, partially in response to complaints about Weinstein's conduct at the Archives. The policy was further codified and strengthened in 2013.

=== Sexual assault allegations ===
In 2018, it came to light that Weinstein's resignation from the National Archives was forced. An investigation by the Office of the Inspector General (OIG) found credible complaints of sexual harassment, sexual assault, or both from six female employees from 2005 to 2007. Weinstein's defense was that the medication he was taking for Parkinson's disease was at fault. Eventually, despite resistance from the White House Counsel, he agreed to resign, but the reasons why were not publicly disclosed until FOIA requests were made in 2017–2018. During his tenure as a professor at the University of Maryland afterward, according to anonymous sources quoted in an article in The Daily Beast, Weinstein allegedly sexually assaulted a graduate student in 2010. The real reason for Weinstein's departure two weeks afterward was the administration firing him after hearing the complaint, rather than health reasons.

== Publications ==
- Prelude to Populism: Origins of the Silver Issue, 1867–1878 (Yale University Press, 1970) (ISBN 0-300-01229-2)
- Freedom and Crisis: An American History (Random House, 1974) (ISBN 0-394-32612-1)
- Perjury: The Hiss–Chambers Case (Knopf 1978) (ISBN 0-394-49546-2)
- The Haunted Wood: Soviet Espionage in America—The Stalin Era (with Alexander Vassiliev) (Random House, 1999) (ISBN 0-679-45724-0)
- The Story of America: Freedom and Crisis from Settlement to Superpower (with David Rubel) (DK Publishing, 2002) (ISBN 0-7894-8903-1)

Government offices
Preceded by John W. Carlin	Archivist of the United States; February 16, 2005–December 19, 2008	Succeeded by Adrienne Thomas; Acting
