= Adrienne Thomas (archivist) =

American archivist

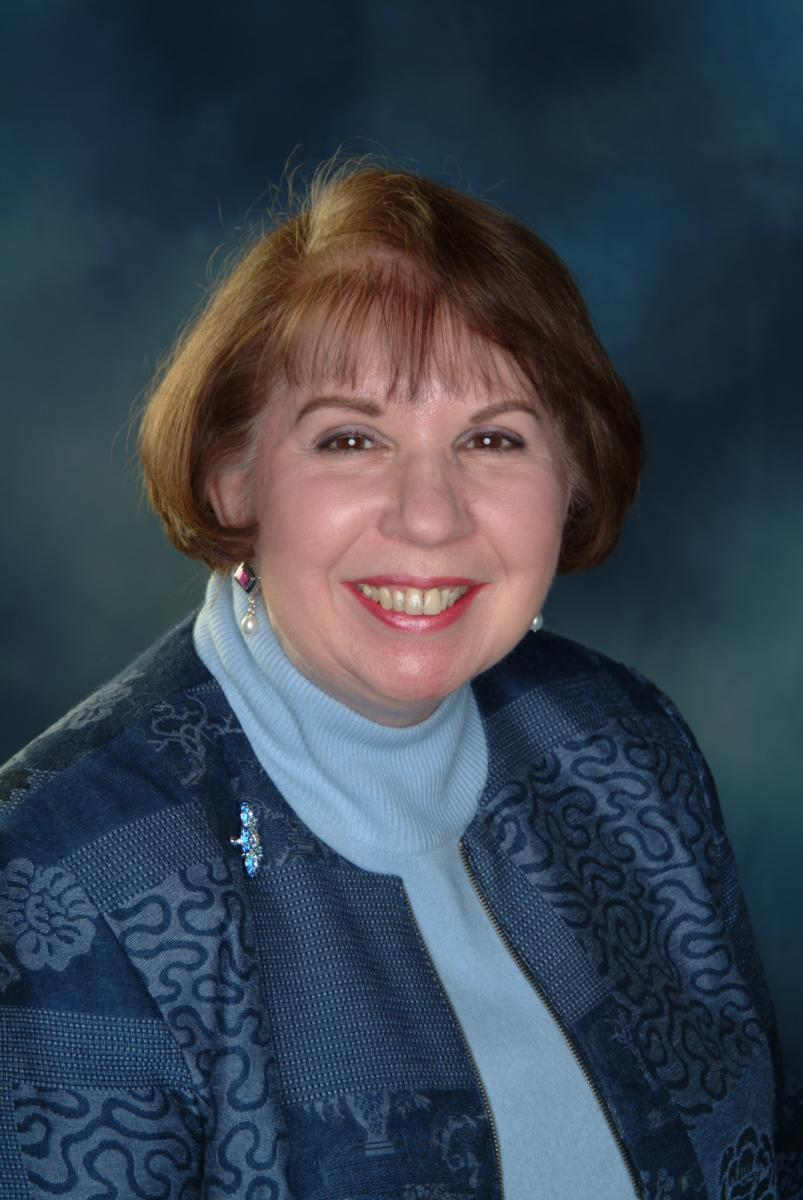

Acting Archivist of the United States
- In office December 19, 2008 – November 5, 2009
- President: George W. Bush; Barack Obama
- Preceded by: Allen Weinstein
- Succeeded by: David Ferriero

Deputy Archivist of the United States
- In office December 31, 2007 – April 1, 2011
- Preceded by: Lewis Bellardo
- Succeeded by: Debra Steidel Wall

Personal details
- Education: Iowa State University

Adrienne C. Thomas is a former acting Archivist of the United States. She assumed the position of Acting Archivist when the ninth Archivist, Allen Weinstein, announced his resignation on December 7, 2008, effective December 19. Weinstein explained that he was resigning for health reasons. She was succeeded by David Ferriero, who was confirmed by the U.S. Senate on November 6, 2009, as the tenth Archivist of the United States. After 40 years with the National Archives, Ms. Thomas retired on April 1, 2011.

Thomas is a graduate of Iowa State University with a master's degree in American history.

== Career ==
- 2007–2011 – Deputy Archivist of the United States.
- 2008–2009 – Acting Archivist of the United States.
- 1994–2007 – Assistant Archivist for Administration and Chief Financial Officer.
- 1987–1994 – Deputy to the Assistant Archivist for Administrative Services.
- 1974–1987 – Director of the Planning and Analysis Division.

Government offices
Preceded by Allen Weinstein	Acting Archivist of the United States; 2008–2009	Succeeded by David Ferriero
