= Taint (legal) =

Taint is a term used in the legal field with reference to evidence that has been "tainted" or ruined in some manner. The most common of such usage is with reference to evidence, testimony, identification by witnesses, or confessions that have been obtained by law enforcement illegally. The illegality usually results from a violation of one's constitutional rights, such as a violation of the Fourth Amendment of the Constitution protecting against unreasonable search and seizure. For example, the dissent in the Supreme Court decision of Missouri v. Seibert stated that "the court must examine whether the taint dissipated through the passing of time ... ." Missouri v. Seibert, 542 U.S. 600, 628 (U.S. 2004) (Justice O'Connor Dissent, emphasis added). The court in Wong Sun v. U.S., discussed "purg[ing] of the primary taint" with reference to allowing evidence because the defendant's statements were voluntary and a lengthy period of time had passed as an intervening act. Wong Sun v. U.S., 371 U.S. 471, (1963) (quoting J. Maguire, Evidence of Guilt 221 (1959) (emphasis added) (stating: "... by means sufficiently distinguishable to be purged of the primary taint.")).

Investigators sometimes employ a "filter team," or "taint team," composed of individuals not involved in an investigation, to prevent investigators from seeing information that could taint evidence, such as information protected by attorney-client privilege.
