= Debra Steidel Wall =

American archivist

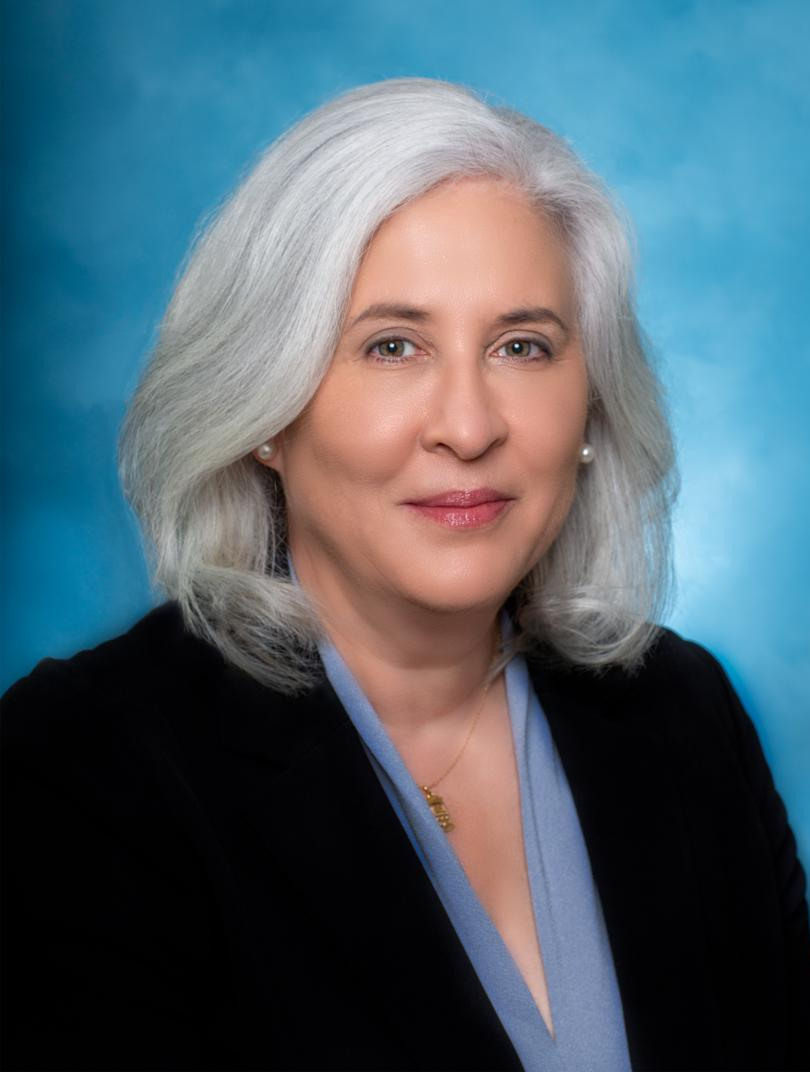
- Official portrait

Acting Archivist of the United States
- In office May 1, 2022 – May 17, 2023
- President: Joe Biden
- Preceded by: David Ferriero
- Succeeded by: Colleen Joy Shogan

Personal details
- Education: Georgetown University (BA); American University (MA)

Debra Steidel Wall is an American archivist who served as the acting archivist of the United States, the head of the National Archives and Records Administration.

== Education ==
Wall earned a Bachelor of Arts degree in history and government from Georgetown University and a Master of Arts in film from the American University.

== Career ==
Wall began her career at the National Archives in 1991 as an archivist trainee with a specialty in film. She served as the agency's chief of staff of the National Archives from 2008 to 2011. Wall became deputy archivist in July 2011, the second highest position at the agency.

In 2018, she was appointed to the Women’s Suffrage Centennial Commission.

On May 1, 2022, Wall became acting archivist upon the retirement of David Ferriero.
