= David Ferriero =

American archivist (born 1945)

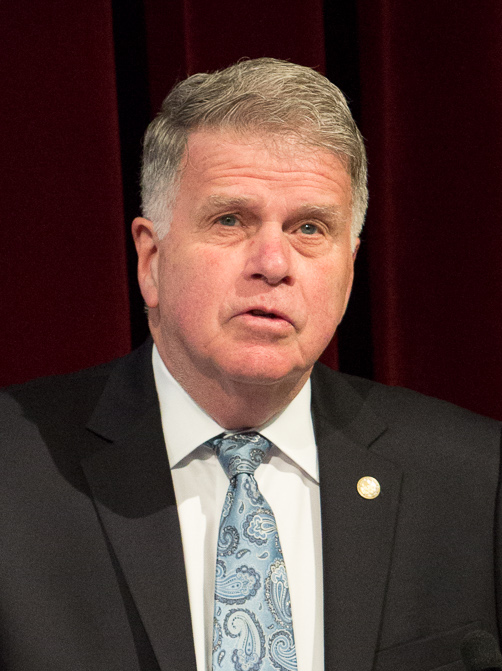

10th Archivist of the United States
- In office November 6, 2009 – April 30, 2022
- President: Barack Obama; Donald Trump; Joe Biden
- Deputy: Debra Steidel Wall
- Preceded by: Adrienne Thomas (acting)
- Succeeded by: Debra Steidel Wall (acting)

Personal details
- Born: David Sean Ferriero; December 31, 1945 (age 80) Beverly, Massachusetts, U.S.
- Education: Northeastern University (BA, MA); Simmons College (MS)

Military service
- Branch/service: United States Navy
- Battles/wars: Vietnam War

David Sean Ferriero (/ˈfɛrioʊ/; born December 31, 1945) is an American librarian and library administrator, who served as the tenth Archivist of the United States. He previously served as the director of the New York Public Library and as the University Librarian and Vice Provost for Library Affairs at Duke University. Prior to his Duke position, he worked for 31 years at the Massachusetts Institute of Technology library. Ferriero was the first librarian to serve as Archivist of the United States.

== Early life and education ==
Ferriero was born and raised in Beverly, Massachusetts, and graduated from Beverly High School. He earned a bachelor's degree and a master's degree in English literature from Northeastern University.

Ferriero's education was interrupted by service in the United States Navy during the Vietnam War. He served as a Navy hospital corpsman assigned to a Marine unit in Danang, Vietnam, and on a hospital ship, the USS Sanctuary, in Vietnamese waters.

Following his military service, he earned a Master of Science degree in library and information science from Simmons College.

== Career ==
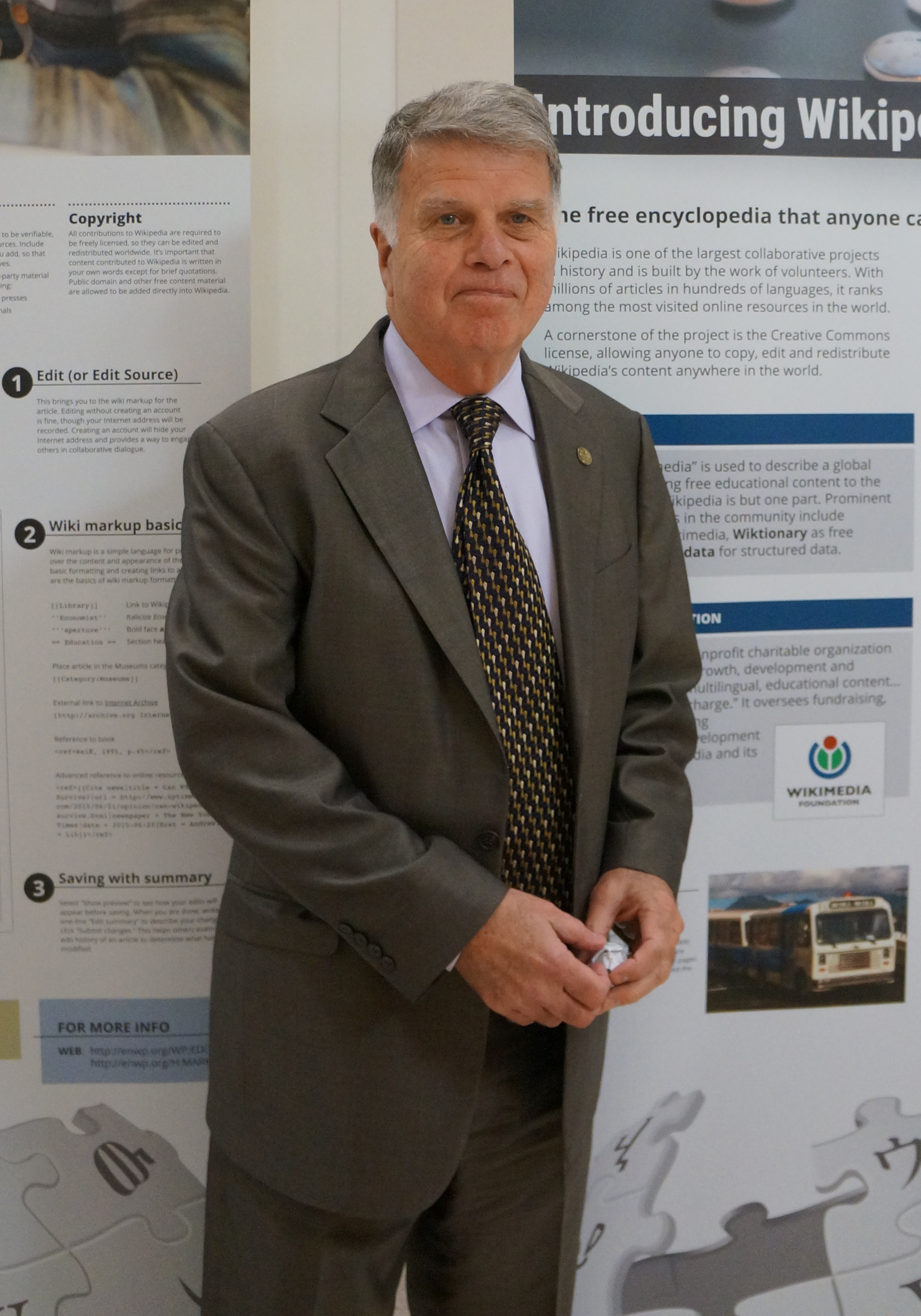
Ferriero at WikiConference USA 2015 at the National Archives

=== MIT Libraries ===
Ferriero worked at MIT Libraries for 31 years, including as associate director of public services.

=== Duke University Library ===
Ferriero was the Rita DiGiallonardo Holloway University Librarian and vice provost for library affairs at Duke University from 1996 through 2004. Ferriero was the first Duke University librarian to address the members of the university's board of trustees in person. He was actively involved in the evolution of North Carolina's Triangle Research Libraries Network (TRLN).

=== New York Public Library ===
Ferriero was the Andrew W. Mellon Director and Chief Executive of the Research Libraries at the New York Public Library (NYPL) from 2004. In 2007 his role expanded with additional responsibilities as director of New York Public Library's Branch Libraries. He was responsible for the management and operations of NYPL's research libraries since 2005 and the branch libraries since 2007. He presided over a major restructuring, which was accompanied by elimination of some positions and the creation of new ones. Ferriero argued that transformation was imperative as NYPL adapted to the profound cultural and societal developments affecting the future of libraries.

Ferriero prioritized staff recruitment, retention, training, development, and compensation. He also made it a point to try to visit the main reading room every day, assessing the varied needs of NYPL patrons.

==== Cataloging ====
Ferriero was the NYPL's Partner Representative in OCLC (Online Computer Library Center), which with its member libraries co-operatively produces and maintains WorldCat—the OCLC Online Union Catalog. During Ferriero's tenure, the library stopped using the unique "Billings classification system" for its reference books in the Rose Reading Room (main reading room) (the classification system is named for John Shaw Billings, the former NYPL librarian who devised and introduced it in the nineteenth century).

==== Google digitization partnership ====
The NYPL joined the Google Books Library Project during Ferriero's tenure. Google and major international libraries have agreed to making collections of public domain books available for scanning to be offered to the public online, without charge.

== National Archives and Records Administration ==
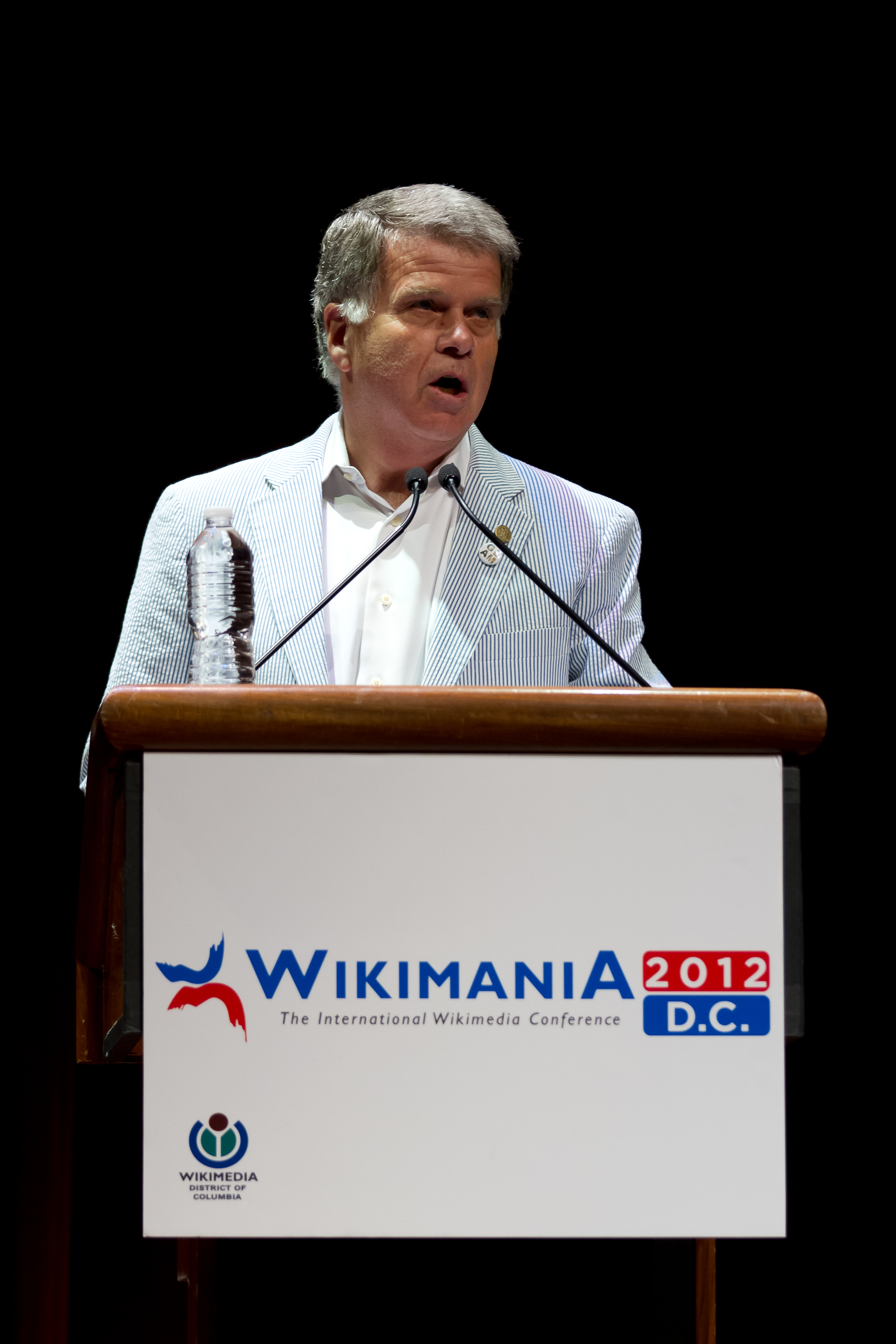
Ferriero keynoting at Wikimania 2012

On July 28, 2009, President Obama nominated Ferriero to be 10th Archivist of the United States.

An early October confirmation hearing was scheduled by a subcommittee of the Senate Committee on Homeland Security and Governmental Affairs. According to the subcommittee chairman, Senator Thomas Carper of Delaware, Ferriero's quick confirmation by the Senate was never in doubt.

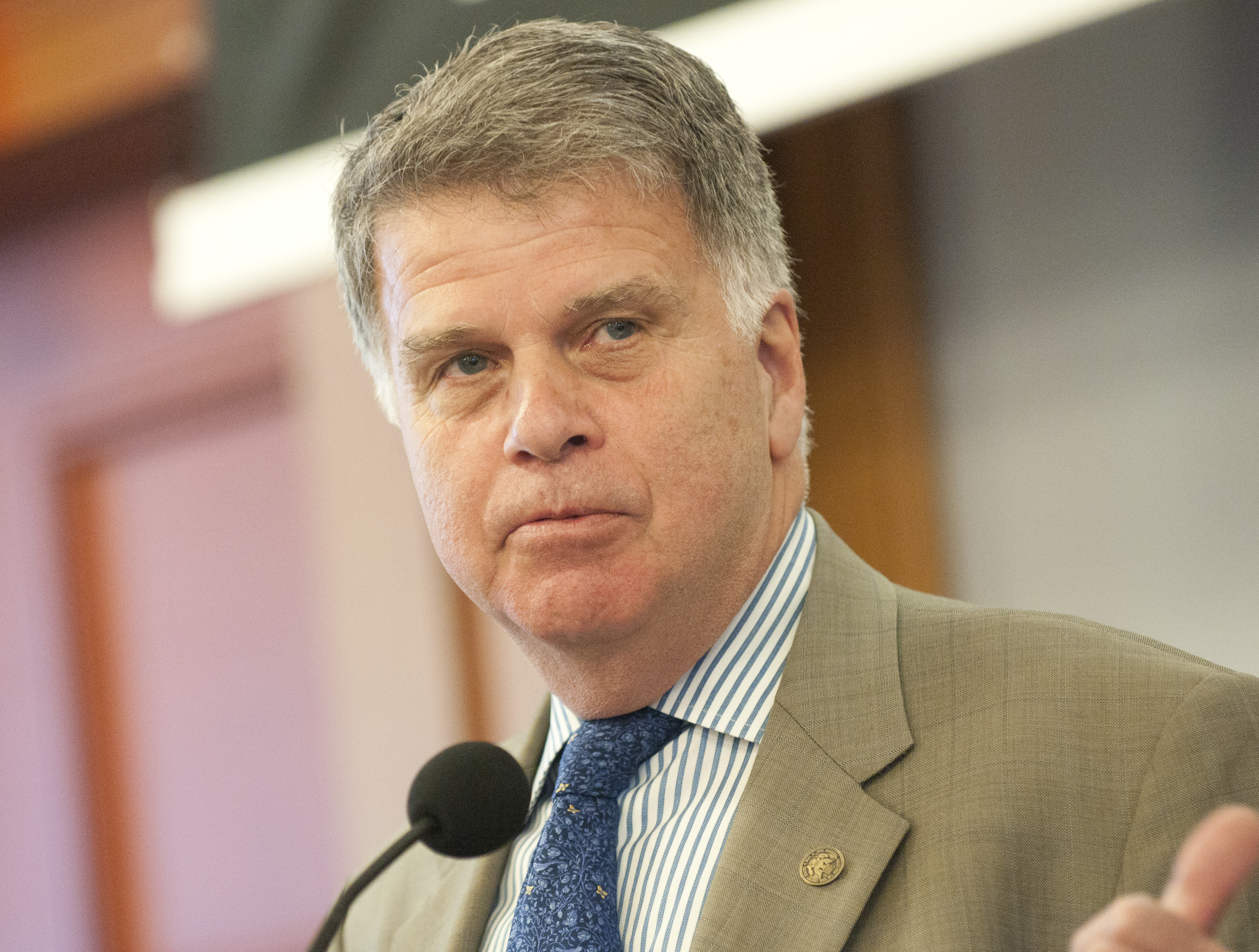
David Ferriero giving opening address at 2011 Wikipedia in Higher Education Summit

Ferriero used the public occasion to express his view that the National Archives was at a "defining moment with regard to our existing electronic records, social media communications, and emerging technologies being used throughout government offices." He also noted "issues of collection security, the future of the Presidential Library system, backlogs in processing, staff job satisfaction, stakeholder relationships, preservation and storage needs."

He was confirmed by the U.S. Senate on November 6, 2009; he was sworn into his new office on November 13, 2009.

President Obama appointed Ferriero to simultaneously head the new National Declassification Center, which had "been given four years to go through 400 million pages of federal documents that remain top secret. They date to World War I."

On January 13, 2022, Ferriero announced he would retire effective mid-April 2022 after a twelve-year tenure as Archivist of the United States. He urged President Biden to "not hire another white male" to replace him, and said that he chose to retire at that point so that Biden could be the one to name his replacement. Ferriero's retirement was effective on April 30, 2022, and Deputy Archivist Debra Steidel Wall took over as acting Archivist of the United States.

=== Relationship with Wikipedia ===
As part of his tenure at the National Archives, Ferriero took an active interest in working with Wikipedia, of which he has called himself "a huge fan." When questioned about the National Archives' engagement with Wikipedia, his response was that "the Archives is involved with Wikipedia because that's where the people are." Under Ferriero's aegis, the National Archives worked with the Wikimedia Foundation since 2009, having had a Wikipedian in Residence and uploaded thousands of images to Wikimedia Commons. He quoted a blogger in saying: "If Wikipedia is good enough for the Archivist of the United States, maybe it should be good enough for you."

=== Censorship of archival imagery ===
In January 2020, Ferriero supported the Archives' decision to censor a photograph containing signs critical of President Trump and references to women's anatomy in an exhibit devoted to the centennial of women's suffrage in the United States. The Washington Post reported that Ferriero "participated in talks regarding the exhibit and supports the decision to edit the photo." The alteration of the image was immediately criticized by historians, with Douglas Brinkley saying "to confuse the public is reprehensible. The head of the Archives has to very quickly fix this damage." Subsequently, the National Archives issued an apology for the decision and promised to restore the original image and review its exhibit policies.

== Personal life ==
Ferriero married Gail Zimmermann, the daughter of MIT Professor Emeritus Henry Zimmermann. Her career in broadcasting has led to her position as Associate General Manager of PBS North Carolina in Durham, North Carolina. Before moving to North Carolina, she worked with WGBH-TV in Boston.

== Affiliations ==
- PLUS Coalition (Picture Licensing Universal System), Board of Directors.
- Association of Research Libraries (ARL).
- Council on Library and Information Resources/Association of American Publishers, Joint Working Group on Scholarly Communication.
- Early English Books Online (EEBO), editorial advisory board.
- Center for Research Libraries.
- Research Libraries Group.
- Research Collections and Preservation Consortium (ReCAP), Board of Directors

Political offices
Preceded by Adrienne Thomas; Acting	Archivist of the United States; 2009–2022	Succeeded by Debra Steidel Wall; Acting
