= Kash Patel =

Director of the Federal Bureau of Investigation since 2025

- Official portrait, 2025

9th Director of the Federal Bureau of Investigation
- Incumbent
- Assumed office February 21, 2025
- President: Donald Trump
- Deputy: Robert Kissane (acting); Dan Bongino; Andrew Bailey; Christopher Raia
- Preceded by: Christopher A. Wray

Director of the Bureau of Alcohol, Tobacco, Firearms and Explosives
- Acting; February 24, 2025 – April 10, 2025
- President: Donald Trump
- Preceded by: Marvin G. Richardson (acting)
- Succeeded by: Daniel P. Driscoll (acting)

Chief of Staff to the United States Secretary of Defense
- In office November 29, 2020 – January 20, 2021
- President: Donald Trump
- Preceded by: Jennifer Stewart
- Succeeded by: Kelly Magsamen

Acting Principal Deputy Director of National Intelligence
- In office February 20, 2020 – May 13, 2020
- President: Donald Trump
- Preceded by: Andrew P. Hallman
- Succeeded by: Neil Wiley

Personal details
- Born: Kashyap Pramod Patel; February 25, 1980 (age 46) Garden City, New York, U.S.
- Party: Republican
- Domestic partner: Alexis Wilkins (2023–present)
- Education: University of Richmond (BA); University College London (CertHE); Pace University (JD)
- Patel's voice Patel speaks on issues including the illegal drug trade and the assassination of Charlie Kirk. Recorded September 16, 2025

Kashyap Pramod Patel (Note: Gujarati: કશ્યપ પ્રમોદ પટેલ, romanized: Kaśyapa Pramōda Paṭēla) (born February 25, 1980) is an American lawyer who has served since 2025 as the director of the Federal Bureau of Investigation. Patel also served as acting director of the Bureau of Alcohol, Tobacco, Firearms and Explosives from February to April 2025. He served as the chief of staff to the United States secretary of defense from 2020 to 2021 and as the acting principal deputy director of national intelligence.

Patel studied criminal justice and history at the University of Richmond and graduated from the Pace University School of Law. In 2005, he began working as a public defender in Miami-Dade County, Florida, and later as a federal public defender for the Southern District of Florida. Patel worked as a staff member at the Department of Justice from 2012 to 2017; he then left the department and became a senior aide to Devin Nunes, the chairman of the House Permanent Select Committee on Intelligence. Patel was the primary author of the Nunes memo, alleging that Federal Bureau of Investigation (FBI) officials abused their authority in the FBI investigation into links between associates of Donald Trump and Russian officials.

In February 2019, Patel joined the National Security Council's International Organizations and Alliances directorate. In 2020, he became the principal deputy director of national intelligence until May, when he returned to the National Security Council. In November, after President Donald Trump dismissed Mark Esper as secretary of defense, Patel was named as the chief of staff to acting Secretary of Defense Christopher C. Miller.

After Trump left office in January 2021, Patel leveraged his association with Trump to promote several business ventures and made recurring appearances on several podcasts. In April 2022, he was named to the board of Trump Media & Technology Group. Also that year, he was appointed to represent Trump before the National Archives and Records Administration; the FBI questioned Patel about his involvement in Trump's records. He has promoted conspiracy theories about the deep state, the 2020 presidential election, and the January 6 United States Capitol attack.

Patel has been widely described as a Trump loyalist. He shares Trump's view that the FBI has been weaponized against conservatives. He has called for "major, major reform", citing the bureau's misuse of its surveillance authority under the FISA and James Comey's handling of the Hillary Clinton email investigation.

On December 11, 2024, Christopher A. Wray announced that he would resign at the end of Joe Biden's presidency on January 20, 2025. Patel appeared before the Senate Committee on the Judiciary in January 2025. He was confirmed by the Senate in February. Shortly thereafter, he was named as the acting director of the Bureau of Alcohol, Tobacco, Firearms and Explosives, but by April he was replaced. Patel is the first person of South Asian descent to serve as FBI director. His tenure at the FBI has involved several controversies related to his professional conduct and alleged use of federal resources for personal travel.

== Early life and education ==
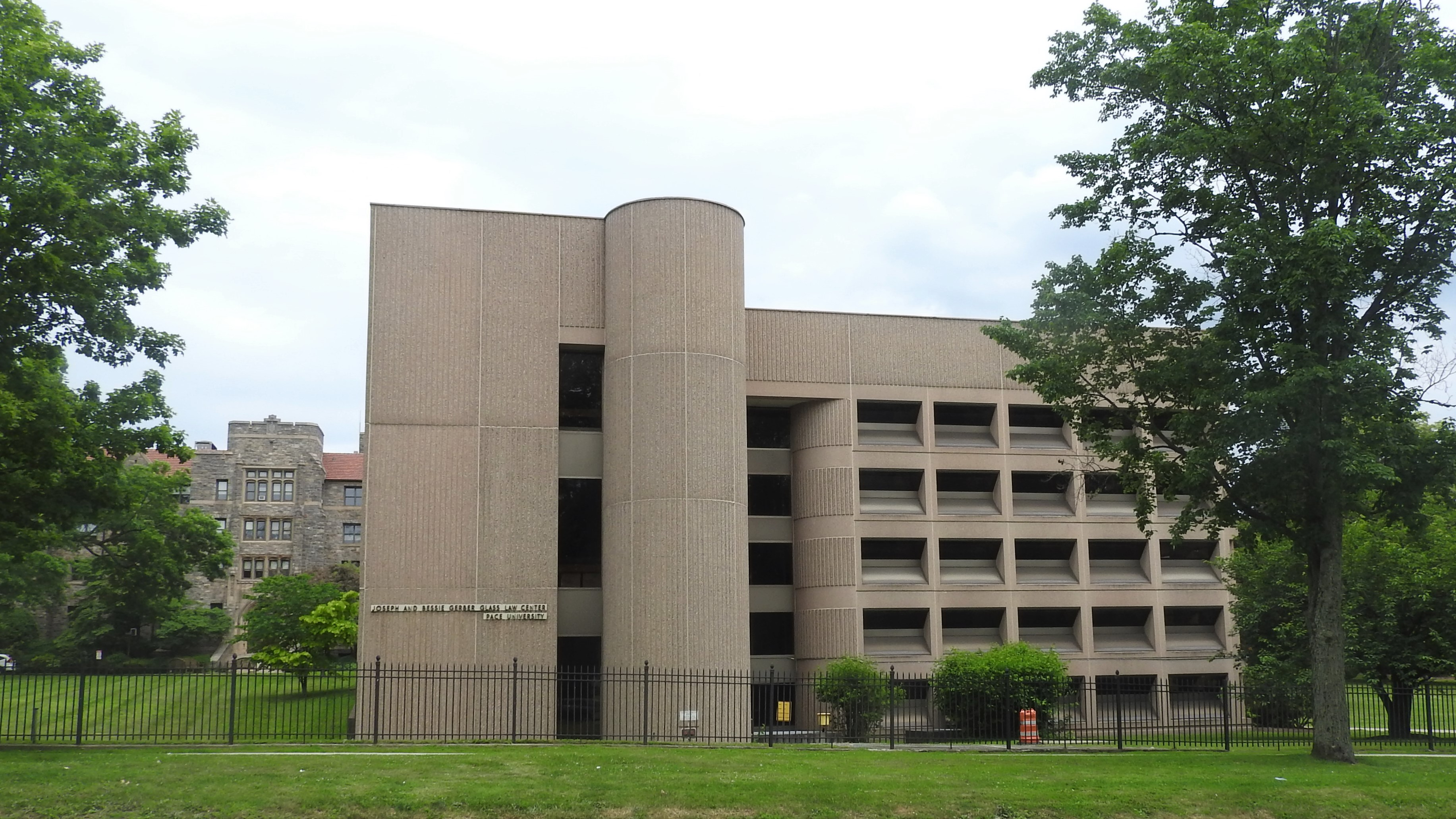
The Pace University School of Law, where Patel received his Juris Doctor degree (pictured in 2021)

Kashyap Pramod Patel was born on February 25, 1980, in Garden City, New York, on Long Island. He is the son of Pramod Rameshchandra Patel, a Gujarati Indian-Ugandan who was among those who faced ethnic persecution and were expelled by Ugandan president Idi Amin in 1972. The Patels were originally from the village of Bhadran in the Anand district of Gujarat, India. Chh Gam Patidar Mandal, an organization in Bhadran, has maintained a vanshavali, or family tree of the Patel family for 18 generations. They briefly returned to India while seeking asylum in the United States, the UK, and Canada. They moved to Canada once their applications were accepted. Subsequently, they moved to the U.S., where Pramod started working as a chief financial officer for a global distributor of aircraft bearings. The Patel household included Kashyap's eight brothers and sisters. He was raised Hindu.

Patel attended Garden City High School. For his senior-year yearbook quotation, he chose "Racism is man's gravest threat—the maximum of hatred for a minimum reason", by Rabbi Abraham Joshua Heschel. During summers, Patel worked as a caddie at the Garden City Country Club. According to his memoir, Government Gangsters (2023), although he was interested in medical school programs, he was inspired by defense attorneys who golfed at the club.

Patel graduated from the University of Richmond in 2002 with a degree in criminal justice and history. He earned a certificate in international law from University College London, and graduated from the Pace University School of Law in 2005. According to a questionnaire he sent to the Senate Committee on the Judiciary, Patel participated in the American Bar Association's "Judicial Intern Opportunity Program", a diversity initiative, as a Pace student in 2003.

== Career ==
=== Public defender and federal prosecutor (2005–2017) ===
Patel's professional career began in the Miami-Dade area. He worked as a public defender in Miami-Dade County, Florida, handling violent crime and drug trafficking cases, and later as a federal public defender for the Southern District of Florida. In 2012, he began working as a junior staff member at the Department of Justice. He coordinated with judges to get approvals for arrest warrants. Patel served as a board member of the South Asian Bar Association of North America.

Patel served temporarily as a representative for the Criminal Division on the case against the perpetrators of the 2012 Benghazi attack, but he was removed over disagreements he had with the office leading the case, the U.S. Attorney's Office for the District of Columbia. Later, he claimed he had been the case's lead prosecutor. According to The Atlantic, former colleagues said the U.S. Attorney's Office led the prosecution, not Patel.

In his memoir, Patel wrote that he had been asked to join the trial team against Ahmed Abu Khattala, a militia leader in the Libyan civil war. According to The New York Times, he was not offered that position.

By 2013, Patel had been assigned to the National Security Division as a prosecutor. He concurrently served as a legal liaison for the Joint Special Operations Command. In January 2014, Patel took a junior position in the Counterterrorism Division. He had flown from Tajikistan to Texas for a chambers meeting about a terrorism trial with Judge Lynn Hughes. Hughes berated Patel for his unprofessional attire and dismissed him from the chambers. Patel's bosses were angered by Hughes's response, and spoke with the US Attorney's Office about admonishing her. Patel left the Department of Justice in 2017. He later said the department's response to the 2016 presidential election was the impetus for his departure, but one former colleague said they believed Patel continued to feel unsupported after the incident with Hughes.

=== House committee aide (2017–2019) ===
In April 2017, Patel began working for the House Permanent Select Committee on Intelligence, then led by Representative Devin Nunes. Patel was a primary author of the Nunes memo, but he did not lead the investigation. During the investigation, Patel attempted to serve a subpoena to CIA Director Mike Pompeo. Released in February 2018, the memo established errors in the FBI's FISA warrant application for Trump campaign advisor Carter Page during the FBI's Russia investigation, including reliance on the Steele dossier.

The memo's veracity was questioned, but Inspector General Michael E. Horowitz corroborated the finding that there were errors in the FBI's FISA application against Page. Lawfare said implication of political bias was unsubstantiated. The memo boosted Patel's standing among Trump supporters.

As an aide to Nunes, Patel also investigated the theory that Ukrainians were promulgating information about Russian interference in the 2016 United States elections.

After the commencement of the 116th United States Congress, Patel served as senior counsel for the House Committee on Oversight and Government Reform.

=== National Security Council aide and acting deputy director of national intelligence (2019–2020) ===
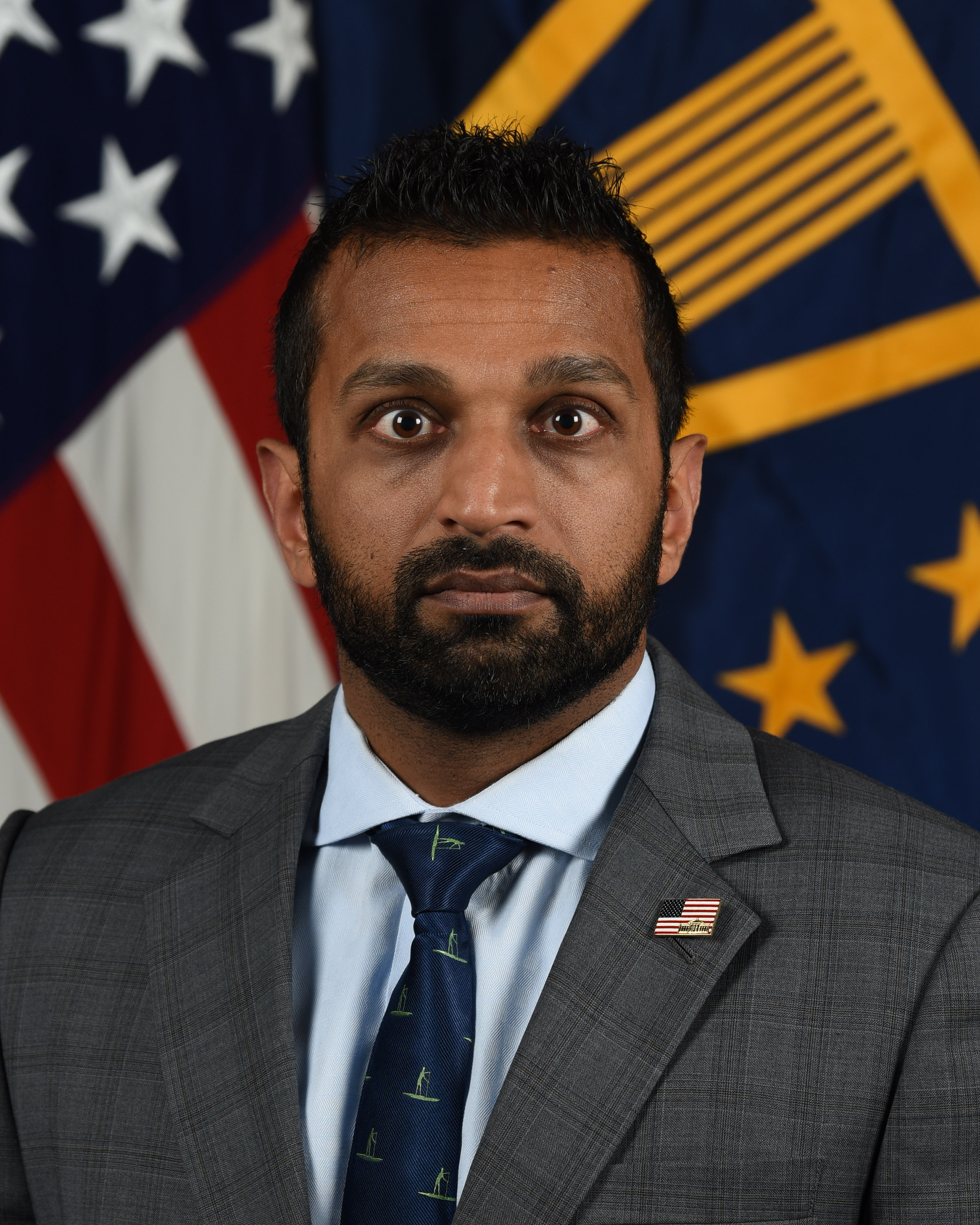
Official portrait of Patel, 2020.

In February 2019, Patel joined the National Security Council. Trump's national security advisor John Bolton and his deputy Charles Kupperman assigned Patel to the International Organizations and Alliances directorate, which handles United Nations policy; according to The Divider, Patel was a "must-hire, directed by the president."

In April 2019, Patel shifted his work to Ukraine. According to the Times, Trump discussed documents involving Ukraine with Patel, although their communications were separate from those of Rudy Giuliani and Ambassador to the European Union Gordon Sondland. The House Permanent Select Committee on Intelligence reported a 25-minute call between Giuliani and Patel in May. In an interview with CBS News, Patel denied being part of any Ukraine back channel, saying the call with Giuliani was personal.

In July 2019, Patel was appointed senior director of the counterterrorism directorate at the National Security Council. Fiona Hill warned colleagues to be careful about sharing information with Patel due to suspicion that he was circumventing the bureaucracy to give Trump information directly. Diplomats Gordon Sondland and George P. Kent testified that they did not encounter Patel during their Ukraine work. Patel denied having discussed Ukraine with Trump.

In February 2020, Patel become an advisor to Richard Grenell, the acting director of national intelligence. After Andrew P. Hallman's resignation, Patel became the principal deputy director of national intelligence. He was given a mandate to "clean house" and promptly reduced the staffing of the Office of the Director of National Intelligence. Patel was involved in reviewing the office's staff. He returned as senior director of the NSC counterterrorism directorate after John Ratcliffe was confirmed as director of National Intelligence in May.

In April 2020, Trump devised a plan to oust FBI director Christopher A. Wray and appoint William Evanina to lead the bureau, while Patel would become deputy director. Attorney General William Barr halted the plan, threatening to resign.

In August 2020, Patel and Roger D. Carstens, the special envoy for hostage affairs, traveled to Damascus to meet with Ali Mamlouk, the director of Syria's National Security Bureau. In October, Bloomberg News reported that he had met with an unnamed Syrian official to discuss releasing Austin Tice, an American journalist who was captured in 2012, and Majd Kamalmaz, a Syrian-American therapist who disappeared in 2017. In May 2024, U.S. national security officials told Kamalmaz's family that they had obtained intelligence indicating he had died in captivity.

Patel was involved in a military operation to rescue Philip Walton from Nigeria. According to former Defense Secretary Mark Esper's memoir, Patel told Pentagon officials that Secretary of State Mike Pompeo had secured approval to enter Nigeria's airspace, but when SEAL Team Six was already en route, Esper learned the clearance had not been obtained, and the aircraft circled for approximately an hour until permission was granted. Esper wrote that his team "suspected Patel made the approval story up". Patel denied wrongdoing, saying he "acted appropriately, relayed all information accurately and never jeopardized the safety of the hostages". Anthony Tata, the Pentagon official who received the information from Patel, later defended him, saying Patel "relayed a message from the State Department to me, which he believed to be true".

=== Chief of staff to the secretary of defense (2020–2021) ===
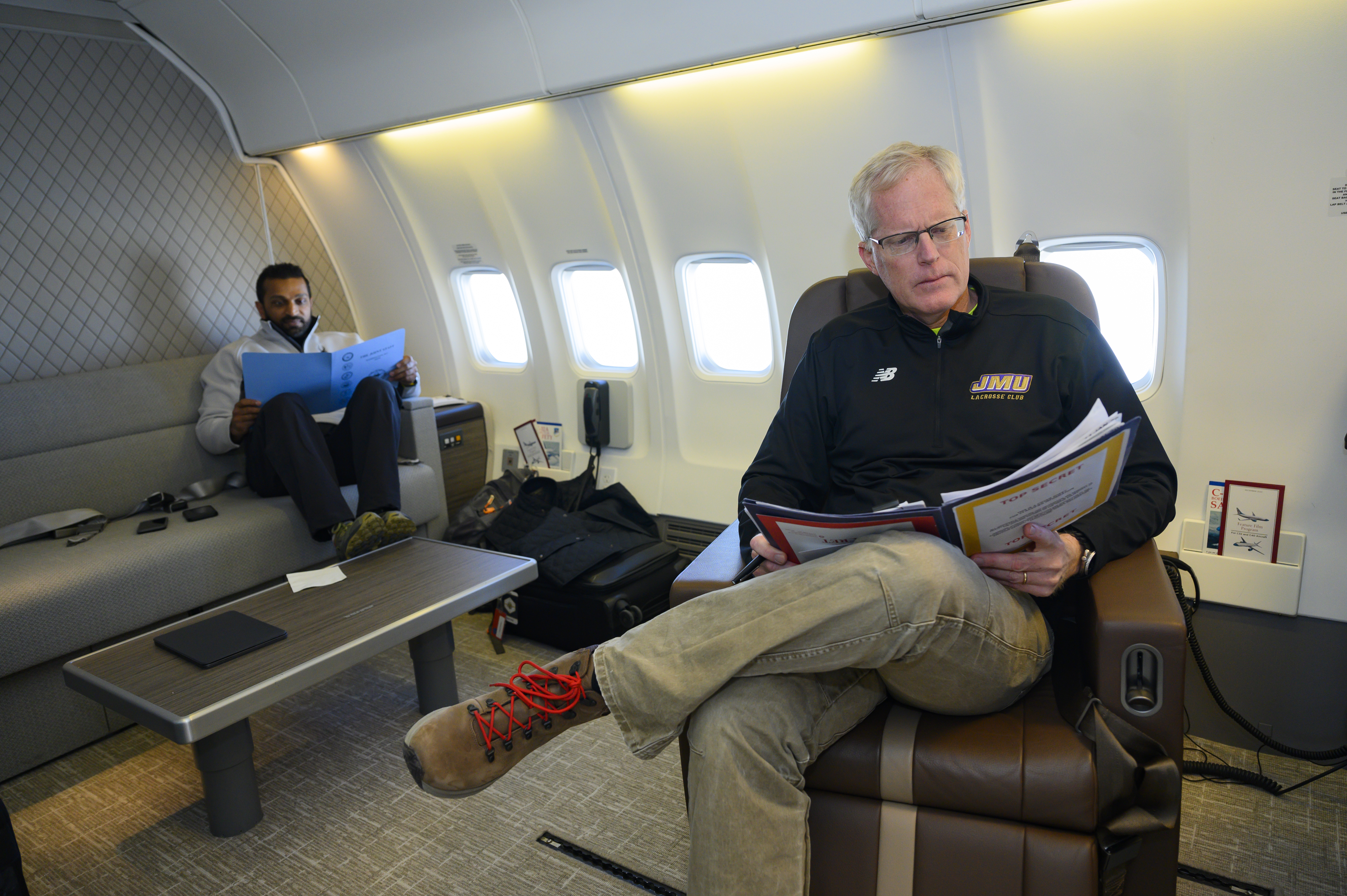
Patel (left) with Christopher C. Miller, the acting secretary of defense, in January 2021

In November 2020, Trump dismissed Esper, naming Christopher C. Miller as acting defense secretary. Patel was appointed Miller's chief of staff; he had previously worked for Miller at the National Security Council and was well-regarded by him. An unnamed senior national security official told Vanity Fair that Miller was "the frontman" while Patel and Ezra Cohen, the under secretary of defense for intelligence, were "calling all the shots".

Patel oversaw the Department of Defense's transition efforts during the presidential transition of Joe Biden; On December 4, The Washington Post called Patel a "perceived Trump loyalist". On December 5, NBC News reported he was blocking the transition. The Department of Defense denied those reports, saying Patel had delegated transition responsibilities to a career civilian official. According to The New York Times, transition officials expressed distrust of Patel, viewing him as a Trump loyalist.

Patel supported an internal proposal to separate the National Security Agency from United States Cyber Command.

In December 2020, Trump sought to appoint Patel as the deputy director of the Central Intelligence Agency. In response, CIA director Gina Haspel threatened to resign. At the annual Army–Navy Game that month, chairman of the Joint Chiefs of Staff Mark Milley confronted White House chief of staff Mark Meadows, repeatedly and loudly asking whether Patel was going to replace Wray or Haspel. In response to now disproven theories about Italian interference in the 2020 election, later dubbed "Italygate", Patel called acting deputy attorney general Richard Donoghue to inquire. Miller separately contacted an attaché in Rome to request an investigation.

In the final days of Trump's presidency, My Pillow founder and chief executive Mike Lindell went to the White House; Jabin Botsford, a photographer for The Washington Post, captured a document Lindell was holding that read, "Move Kash Patel to CIA Acting". In April 2022, Patel told an audience that he had advised Trump to fire senior Department of Justice officials.

== Between Trump's presidencies ==
=== Investigations into Donald Trump ===
In September 2021, Patel was subpoenaed by the House Select Committee on the January 6 Attack. In addition, the committee requested that Patel submit to questioning. One of Trump's attorneys instructed Patel to defy the subpoena, but Patel decided to communicate with the committee. The committee requested Patel's communications relating to "the establishment of martial law, requests to establish martial law, or legal analysis of martial law" and "all documents and communications relating to" the Insurrection Act as part of an examination into Trump's efforts to invoke the Insurrection Act of 1807 and declare martial law to overturn the 2020 United States presidential election.

In June 2022, Trump requested that the National Archives and Records Administration grant Patel and journalist John Solomon access to administration records. Their designations were revoked in October 2023. After the FBI search of Mar-a-Lago, Patel claimed that Trump had declassified the seized documents, and his argument was the focus of investigators. As part of the FBI investigation into Trump's handling of government documents, federal prosecutors sought to have Patel testify before a grand jury. He appeared twice before a grand jury in October 2022, repeatedly pleading the Fifth Amendment in his first appearance. Prosecutors offered him immunity in November, securing his testimony. According to The Washington Post, prosecutors asked about his claim that Trump had declassified the documents, as well as Trump's motivation for taking the documents. Patel was represented by Stanley Woodward.

=== Business affairs ===
After Trump left office in 2021, Patel managed Trishul, a consulting company. He founded The Kash Foundation, a nonprofit that intended to financially aid people charged in the context of the January 6 United States Capitol attack and their families; it also sells merchandise branded as K$H. According to a Trump Media & Technology Group filing, Patel worked for Trump as a paid national security advisor. Patel was listed as the director of Trump Media & Technology Group in April 2022. As director, he described promoting QAnon-adjacent accounts on Truth Social, Trump Media's social media service, as an intentional business decision to "capture audiences". In June 2022, Patel was paid $130,000 to investigate claims that the company's co-founders, Andy Dean and Wes Moss, had "fostered an unpredictable and toxic corporate culture". His report was later included in a legal dispute over Dean's and Moss's shares in the company. Patel joined Russell Vought's Center for Renewing America where he helped write position papers, including one on the overuse of classification. For nine months in 2024, Patel was a consultant for Elite Depot, a company based in the Cayman Islands that operates Shein, an e-commerce platform.

=== Political and media activities ===
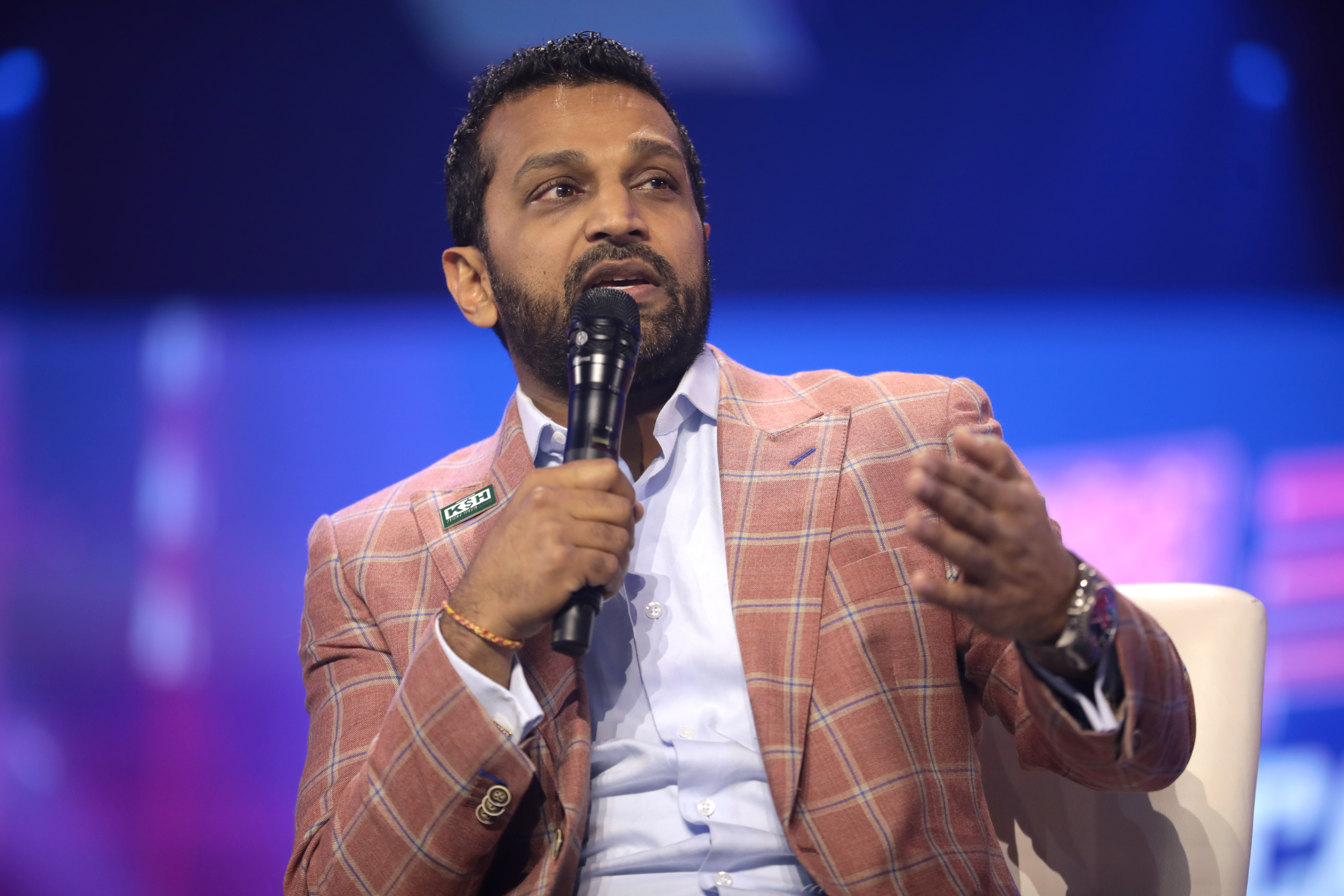
Patel speaking at AmericaFest in 2022

Two former FBI special agents said they received financial support from Patel. One agent had claimed that the FBI was controlled by Democrats and that the January 6 attack was a "setup". Patel helped the other agent get a position with the Center for Renewing America and promote his book. Patel covered legal fees and paid witnesses who testified before the subcommittee, according to The New York Times. He co-produced "Justice for All", a charity record by Trump and a choir of men incarcerated in connection with the attack on the Capitol that was released that month. Patel was a political consultant for Save America and Friends.

NPR described Patel as a "fixture on right-wing talk shows and podcasts". He has appeared eight times on Stew Peters's podcast. The Forward called Peters "an antisemite who later called for the mass deportation of American Jews".

From 2021 to 2023, Patel hosted "Kash's Corner", a show on EpochTV, a streaming television service operated by the Falun Gong-affiliated newspaper The Epoch Times. He interviewed Trump on "Kash's Corner" in February 2022. After Steve Bannon, a former Trump advisor, surrendered to a federal prison in July 2024 for defying a subpoena from the Select Committee on the January 6 Attack, Patel served as a part-time guest host for Bannon's podcast War Room. In 2024, Igor Lopatonok, a Russian filmmaker associated with the Russian government, paid Patel $25,000 to appear on a six-part series, All the President's Men: The Conspiracy Against Trump, on the Tucker Carlson Network.

== Director of the Federal Bureau of Investigation ==
=== Nomination and confirmation ===
In November 2024, President-elect Donald Trump intended to appoint Patel to a high-profile position in the Federal Bureau of Investigation or the Department of Justice. Trump later planned to remove Christopher A. Wray as the director of the Federal Bureau of Investigation, interviewing several candidates for the position, including Patel and former Michigan representative Mike Rogers. Patel was considered as a potential nominee for director of the Central Intelligence Agency, although he faced a narrower path in the Senate. Susie Wiles, Trump's campaign manager, believed Patel would be a risky choice to lead the bureau, but Andrew Bailey, the Missouri attorney general, appeared too lackadaisical in meetings. On November 30, Trump announced that he would dismiss Wray and named Patel as his nominee for the position. Wray agreed to resign in December. Patel conducted policy-focused interviews for the FBI. He was targeted in an Iranian hacking operation that month. In January 2025, 23 former Republican government officials sent senators a letter urging them to reject Patel's nomination.

Patel appeared before the Senate Committee on the Judiciary on January 30. According to The New York Times, he positioned himself as insulated from Trump, disagreeing with Trump's decision to pardon January 6 Capitol attack defendants. Senator Peter Welch repeatedly asked Patel whether Joe Biden won the 2020 presidential election; Patel said that the election was "certified" but did not explicitly say that Biden won. The Judiciary Committee voted to advance his nomination 12–10 along party lines on February 13. In February, Dick Durbin sent the Department of Justice's inspector general a letter accusing Patel of directing dismissals at the bureau. The letter also accused acting deputy attorney general Emil Bove of firing career officials on Patel's behalf. During his confirmation hearing, Patel was criticized for owning shares in Shein's parent company, a stock award he had received from Trump Media & Technology Group, and his work for Qatar through Trishul.

On February 20, Patel was confirmed by the Senate in a 51–49 vote. Every Republican senator except Susan Collins and Lisa Murkowski voted to confirm him and every Democratic senator opposed his nomination. Patel was sworn in the next day by Attorney General Pam Bondi. He took the oath on the Bhagavad Gita, a Hindu scripture, held by his partner, Alexis Wilkins.

=== Initial moves and agency restructuring ===
Patel is sworn in as the director of the Federal Bureau of Investigation on February 21, 2025.

For early decision making, Patel formed an advisory group of retired FBI agents. One member of the group wrote a white paper proposing a shift to a regional FBI model. This advisor said Patel's plan was better, but relied on finding strong leaders for the regional operations. Several FBI leaders who left before Patel's tenure supported reducing the number of agents in the capital. After being sworn in, Patel told officials that he intended to send 1,000 agents from Washington, D.C., to other field offices in cities with higher crime rates and reassign 500 staff members to Redstone Arsenal in Huntsville, Alabama. According to The Wall Street Journal, an official told Patel that the restructuring could cost $100 million that the agency did not have; he was undeterred. Patel removed civil service executives and replaced them with political allies, according to the Journal. In March, The New York Times obtained an internal email from Patel directing the majority of the bureau's field offices—except those in New York, Washington, D.C., and Los Angeles—to report to branch directors rather than the deputy director. In a February call with FBI officials, Patel proposed altering the bureau's physical fitness test and partnering with Ultimate Fighting Championship, while saying he would shift his operations to Nevada, where he lives, and the West Coast. In March, Trump said in a speech that Patel had plans to move the FBI headquarters to an "old Department of Commerce building", suggesting further reductions in staff.

In February, NBC News reported that Patel would be named the acting director of the Bureau of Alcohol, Tobacco, Firearms, and Explosives; he was sworn in on February 24. According to The Washington Post, by March 2025 Patel was not at the bureau. On April 9, Reuters reported that he had been replaced by Daniel P. Driscoll, the secretary of the army.

That month, Patel announced that Hannah Dugan, a Wisconsin circuit court judge, had been arrested for allegedly having "misdirected federal agents away from" an undocumented immigrant. Patel then posted a photograph of Dugan's arrest. Former attorney general Eric Holder said that violated internal DOJ policy. Dugan was later convicted of felony obstruction and resigned.

In April, The New York Times described Patel as highly visible, particularly in his use of bureau aircraft. In May, he advocated reducing the FBI's budget by $500 million, an abrupt departure from his request for "more than what [had] been proposed" the day before. That month, he disbanded the Office of Internal Auditing, which was responsible for monitoring bureau compliance with national security surveillance regulations. In July, Patel announced that the FBI would move into office space at the Ronald Reagan Building and International Trade Center vacated by the closure of the United States Agency for International Development, although Congress had previously appropriated $555 million for a new FBI headquarters and campus in Maryland. On December 26, Patel said that the original FBI headquarters building, the J. Edgar Hoover Building, would permanently close.

Patel's efforts to force senior executives to leave the bureau caused tensions; in particular, he intensified the use of polygraph tests to find leakers. In August, Patel lowered recruitment standards, including removing the bachelor's degree requirement, to enable the bureau to focus more on street crime. In September, he told staff, "Crushing violent crime and protecting national security are intertwined." While reducing crime, Patel's efforts delayed investigative work.

A leaked report based on 24 confidential FBI sources called the FBI in its first six months under Patel a "rudderless ship" that was "internally paralyzed by fear" and said Patel was "in over his head".

=== Epstein files ===
Patel testifying before the House Judiciary Committee, where he is questioned on the Epstein files on September 17, 2025

Amid a resurgence of interest in the Epstein files, the set of documents the United States possesses on the sex offender and financier Jeffrey Epstein; Deputy Attorney General Todd Blanche said he worked on a memorandum with Patel and Dan Bongino, whom Patel had named as his deputy director, that rejected many of the claims about Epstein's death. In a joint interview with Patel in May, Bongino told Maria Bartiromo on Fox Business that Epstein had committed suicide.

Commentators including Tucker Carlson, Alex Jones, and Emerald Robinson criticized the pair; Carlson said they were "making a huge mistake, promising to reveal things and then not revealing them" and Jones accused Patel of "gaslighting". In July, The Wall Street Journal reported that Patel had privately told officials that Trump's name is in the Epstein files. Patel had been critical of Bondi, though she said in a press conference that she had no issues working with him. According to The Washington Post, the conflict was over Bondi's handling of the investigation, with Patel and Bongino privately saying they would have released the files—with information about victims redacted—had they been in charge. In September, appearing before the Senate Committee on the Judiciary, Patel defended his tenure and his handling of the Epstein files. The combative hearing devolved into shouting matches at several moments. The next day, he testified before the House Committee on the Judiciary and denied that he had withheld Epstein-related evidence to defend Trump.

=== Arctic Frost response and personnel dismissals ===
In May, Patel disbanded the bureau's public corruption squad, known internally as CR15. In October, after document releases by Senator Chuck Grassley about the Arctic Frost investigation into electoral malpractice, Patel wrote on social media that CR15 agents had "tracked the communications of GOP Senators" and "weaponized law enforcement against the American people". He announced that the FBI had fired agents involved in the investigation and launched an internal inquiry. In September, three former FBI officials—Brian Driscoll, Steven Jensen, and Spencer Evans—sued Patel and Bondi, alleging wrongful termination. The suit claimed that Patel, acting under direction from the White House and the Department of Justice, fired agents who had worked on investigations involving Trump. According to the lawsuit, Patel privately acknowledged that the firings were retaliatory, potentially illegal, and in violation of FBI protocols that protect agents from political retribution. The alleged statements contradicted Patel's sworn testimony to the Senate. That month, Patel fired about 20 agents, including those who were photographed kneeling amid the George Floyd protests.

In November, at least four agents tied to the Arctic Frost investigation or Special Counsel Jack Smith's probe were terminated, briefly reinstated at the intervention of U.S. Attorney Jeanine Pirro, and then terminated again the next day. The FBI Agents Association criticized the dismissals as "a campaign of erratic and arbitrary retribution", saying, "an agent simply being assigned to an investigation and conducting it appropriately within the law should never be grounds for termination."

=== Charlie Kirk assassination investigation ===
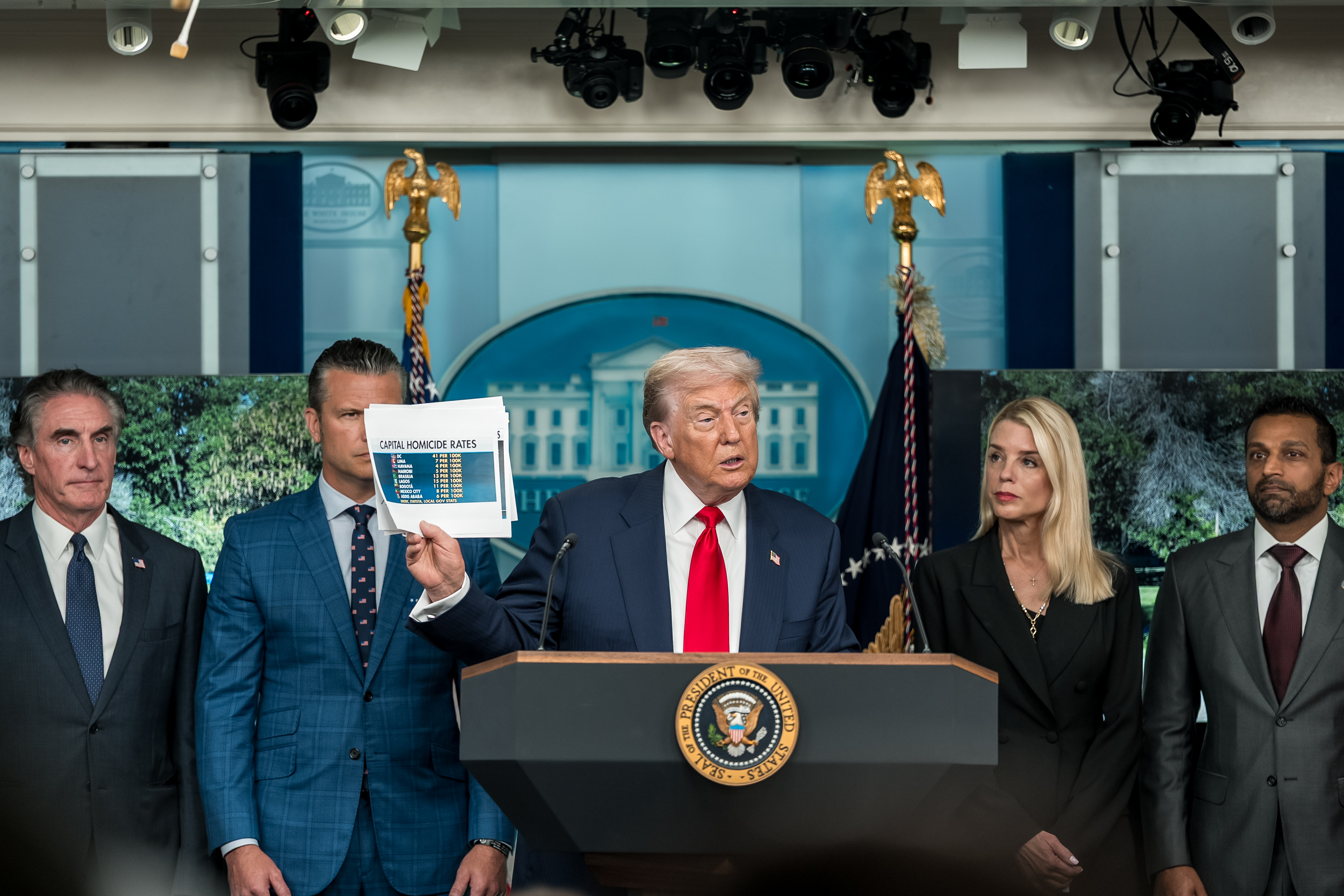
Patel (far right) in a press conference on crime in Washington, D.C. in August 2025

In September, the political activist Charlie Kirk was assassinated at Utah Valley University. The investigation into his killing involved the FBI, which offered technical and logistical support. As the suspect remained elusive, Patel posted on X that a suspect was in custody; at a briefing minutes later, Utah officials indicated the search was ongoing. The next morning, according to The New York Times, Patel criticized subordinates' performance in a profanity-laden meeting, saying he would not tolerate any more "Mickey Mouse operations". He and Bongino traveled to Utah to oversee the investigation; according to a report based on confidential FBI sources, Patel refused to leave his plane until FBI agents could lend him a raid jacket and attach additional Velcro patches to the jacket he was given. Politico reported that the erroneous post came at a time of intense scrutiny of Patel's leadership across the political spectrum and elicited vocal disapproval from current and former FBI agents and Trump's MAGA base.

After backlash from Elon Musk and other prominent conservatives over the Anti-Defamation League's (ADL) inclusion of Kirk and Turning Point USA in its "Glossary of Extremism", the FBI cut ties with the ADL. Patel made a statement condemning the ADL, saying "This FBI won't partner with political fronts masquerading as watchdogs" and criticizing its ties to James Comey. Two days later, Patel announced the FBI was also severing ties with the Southern Poverty Law Center (SPLC), calling it a "partisan smear machine".

=== Foreign intelligence relationships ===
In November 2025, The New York Times reported that MI5 director Ken McCallum had asked Patel in May to protect the job of an FBI agent stationed in London who worked with high-tech surveillance technology. Patel agreed to find funding to keep the position, but the job had already been slated for elimination as the White House moved to cut the FBI budget. The agent was reassigned to the United States, leaving MI5 officials "incredulous," according to The New York Times, which described the episode as "a jarring introduction to Mr. Patel's leadership style."

=== Conduct controversies ===
Patel addressing excessive drinking allegations during a press conference in April 2026

Patel's tenure as FBI director has included controversies over his alleged use of federal resources for travel.

In 2025, Patel flew on a government jet to Scotland to play golf at the Carnegie Club with friends and took several flights to a private hunting ranch in Texas. In November 2025, a controversy erupted after Patel reportedly used the bureau's jet to see his girlfriend, Alexis Wilkins, perform in Pennsylvania. Later that month, he faced more criticism after the FBI confirmed it had assigned a SWAT team of FBI agents to Wilkins as bodyguards. Patel then used FBI personnel to investigate a journalist who reported on Wilkins's use of FBI resources. Justice Department officials expressed concern that this was done mostly in retaliation for the report and lacked legal basis. No further action against the journalist was pursued. In December, congressional Democrats announced their intent to investigate Patel's alleged use of the agency's jet for personal travel.

In February 2026, Patel faced criticism for traveling to the 2026 Winter Olympics in Italy after videos were posted online showing him partying with the U.S. men's hockey team in their locker room after they won the gold medal and chugging a bottle of beer. According to a FBI spokesperson, Patel had been in Milan before the Olympics to coordinate security with local law enforcement. The FBI was busy during this time, due to the disappearance of Nancy Guthrie and the 2026 Mexico cartel unrest. The New York Times said the visit blurred "the lines between personal recreation and professional responsibility" and led to doubt over what the FBI said was the visit's purpose. The concerns were brought up during a Senate appropriations committee hearing in May 2026, and Patel said the FBI had been tasked with security details at the Olympics and that he had been in Italy to facilitate the transfer of a Chinese cybercriminal to US custody after they had been detained by Italian officials.

In May 2026, AP News reported that Patel had visited Hawaii during the previous summer for work purposes before official visits to Australia and New Zealand, and then returned to the islands and participated in a group "VIP snorkeling tour" around the USS Arizona Memorial in Pearl Harbor. The FBI did not disclose the snorkeling session or that Patel had returned to the islands after his trip to Australia and New Zealand. This announcement led to further concerns about Patel's potential blurring of personal trips with professional. The US Navy confirmed that the snorkeling tour had included Patel and nine others and that they had swum for 30 minutes near the ship, which holds the remains of more than 1,000 U.S. service members.

In July 2026, Democratic lawmakers said that Patel's recreational activities on official trips were not isolated incidents and raised concerns and questions about the purpose of his travel. A letter from the ranking members on each chamber's Judiciary Committee, Representative Jamie Raskin and Senator Dick Durbin, says Patel went on other recreational trips while on work travel.

A FOIA-based report by American journalist Seth Hettena found that Patel had instructed the FBI's assistant director for public affairs Ben Williamson to respond to an X account criticizing Patel.

== Views ==
=== Intelligence agencies and investigations ===
We will go out and find the conspirators, not just in government but in the media. Yes, we're going to come after the people in the media who lied about American citizens, who helped Joe Biden rig presidential elections — we're going to come after you.

— Patel speaking to Steve Bannon in December 2023

Patel has been widely described as a loyalist to President Donald Trump. (Note: Attributed to multiple references:) He shares Trump's view that the FBI has been weaponized against conservatives. He has called for "major, major reform", citing the bureau's misuse of its surveillance authority under the FISA and James Comey's handling of the Hillary Clinton email investigation. He has argued the bureau should redistribute agents from Washington to field offices.

In February 2022, following a Durham court filing in the Michael Sussmann case, Patel told Fox News that Clinton's lawyers had worked to "infiltrate" Trump Tower and White House servers. Fox News then used his phrasing in a headline attributing the claim to Durham's filing, though the filing itself used the word "exploited" rather than "infiltrate" and did not allege that the Clinton campaign directed the activity. John Durham subsequently said that "third parties or members of the media" might have "overstated, understated, or otherwise misinterpreted" his filing.

In December 2023, Patel told Steve Bannon on War Room that he would "come after the people in the media who lied about American citizens, who helped Joe Biden rig presidential elections"—echoing false claims of fraud in the 2020 presidential election.

Patel's memoir, Government Gangsters (2023), calls for weakening civil service job protections; Trump praised the book as a "roadmap to end the Deep State's reign". In September 2024, Patel vowed to close the J. Edgar Hoover Building, the FBI headquarters, "reopen it the next day as a museum of the 'deep state'", and "take the 7,000 employees that work in that building and send them across America to chase down criminals". He criticized Elon Musk's acquisition of Twitter on his podcast, Kash's Corner, calling him a monopolist who had improper access to data and accrued his wealth through government contracts.

=== Conspiracy theories ===
Patel has promoted a number of conspiracy theories, (Note: Attributed to multiple references:) including conspiracy theories about a deep state and the January 6 Capitol attack. Patel claimed that Ray Epps, a member of the Oath Keepers, was a secret FBI agent. He played a key role in reframing the January 6 attack, according to USA Today. An NBC News analysis of 79 episodes of his talk show "Kash's Corner" found he made extensive and "detailed but unfounded claims of conspiracies involving government officials, law enforcement agencies, the media and tech companies, among others, all aiming to rig elections, silence conservative voices and undermine Trump's presidency and re-election." On Truth Social, Patel recommended pills that claimed to detoxify the coronavirus spike protein provided by COVID-19 vaccines. On Kash's Corner, he advocated for FBI reform because of alleged "illegitimacy", citing the Hunter Biden laptop controversy. He has promoted the Russia investigation origins conspiracy theory. During his confirmation hearing, Patel denied that he was a conspiracy theorist.

Patel has been involved in the QAnon community, appearing on QAnon podcasts, interacting with QAnon accounts online, signing copies of The Plot Against the King (2022) with "#WWG1WGA", a QAnon message, and creating the #FlannelFridays trend. During his 2025 confirmation hearing he repudiated QAnon, saying, "I have publicly, including in the interviews provided to this committee, rejected outright QAnon baseless conspiracy theories." In 2022, Patel said he specifically agreed with QAnon rhetoric surrounding the origin of SARS-CoV-2, the January 6 Capitol attack, and the first and second impeachments of Donald Trump. He has appeared at the ReAwaken America Tour, a far-right event that promotes QAnon.

== Litigation ==
In October 2019, Patel filed a $44-million defamation suit against The New York Times, and the next month he sued Politico for $25 million, over articles reporting that NSC colleagues had grown concerned he was giving President Trump Ukraine-related materials. The articles drew on Fiona Hill's testimony in the impeachment inquiry into Trump; Patel said the outlets reported secondhand speculation as established fact and that he had never communicated with Trump about Ukraine. Patel's lawyers moved to dismiss both lawsuits in 2021; according to the Times, Patel did not pursue his case against the paper, while Politico's lawyers suggested that the judge was prepared to dismiss the case.

In December 2020, Patel sued CNN for $50 million for defamation over articles connecting him to efforts to spread conspiracy theories about Joe Biden. The trial court dismissed the case, and in January 2025 the Virginia Court of Appeals affirmed, ruling that Patel, as a public official, had failed to adequately plead that CNN acted with actual malice.

In May 2023, Patel sued the Department of Defense over delays in the prepublication review of his memoir, Government Gangsters. The book was published later that year. In June, he sued Jim Stewartson, an online commentator, for defamation over statements that Patel was a "googly-eyed Kremlin bitch" and "blatantly incompetent chud" who had planned the January 6 attack. In August 2025, a federal judge issued a default judgment awarding Patel and his foundation $250,000 after Stewartson failed to respond to the lawsuit. Stewartson challenged the default judgment on the grounds that he had no meaningful ties to Nevada, where the case was filed. United States District Court for the District of Nevada Judge Andrew P. Gordon dismissed the lawsuit in July 2026.

In September 2024, Patel sued FBI director Christopher A. Wray and other Department of Justice officials, arguing that a 2017 grand jury subpoena for his communication records was retaliation for his work on the Nunes memo. The case was dismissed; Judge Amit Mehta ruled the lawsuit did not establish a Fourth Amendment violation and that the defendants were entitled to qualified immunity.

In June 2025, Patel filed a defamation lawsuit against Frank Figliuzzi, a former FBI assistant director, over comments Figliuzzi made on MSNBC's Morning Joe suggesting Patel spent more time in nightclubs than at FBI headquarters. MSNBC issued a correction, and Patel's complaint stated he had "not spent a single minute inside of a nightclub" since becoming director. Figliuzzi moved to dismiss, calling the suit "performative" and arguing that "no reasonable viewer would have understood the remark as literal fact". A judge dismissed the suit in April 2026.

In April 2026, The Atlantic reported, citing multiple unnamed officials, that Patel had been observed drinking to the point of intoxication on multiple occasions, and that his alcohol use had been a recurring concern. Patel denied this, saying: "Print it, all false, I'll see you in court—bring your checkbook." The same month, he sued the magazine for defamation, seeking $250 million in damages. The Atlantic called the suit "meritless" and said it stood behind its reporting. At a May 12 Senate appropriations committee hearing, Patel called the allegations of misconduct "baseless". After Patel announced the suit, Democrats on the House Judiciary Committee demanded that he take an alcohol abuse assessment and share the results with Congress.

== Books ==
Patel has written three children's books inspired by his political views. The Plot Against the King, a storybook about the Steele dossier was published by Brave Books in 2022. He later wrote The Plot Against the King: 2000 Mules (2022), and released The Plot Against the King 3: The Return of the King after the 2024 presidential election. In 2023, Patel wrote Government Gangsters: The Deep State, the Truth, and the Battle for Our Democracy (2023), which contains claims about the FBI investigation into Donald Trump's 2016 presidential campaign that The New York Times characterized as false or misleading. While a Justice Department inspector general found the FBI made errors in its Carter Page wiretap applications, the specific flaws Patel alleged were largely not among them. An appendix to Government Gangsters includes a list of 60 names labeled "Members of the Executive Branch Deep State". The list has been widely interpreted as an enemies list, (Note: Attributed to multiple references:) though Patel rejected that term in his Senate confirmation hearing. The memoir was later adapted into a documentary produced by former Trump advisor Steve Bannon.

== Personal life ==
In his youth, Patel played ice hockey. He later coached a youth hockey league. Patel skates with the Dons, a club team in Washington, D.C.

In October 2022, Patel met Alexis Wilkins, a country singer, at an event as part of the ReAwaken America Tour. They began dating in January 2023, and got engaged in October 2026.

== See also ==
- Indian Americans

== Works cited ==
- Baker, Peter; Glasser, Susan (2022). The Divider: Trump in the White House, 2017-2021. New York: Penguin Random House. ISBN 9780385546539.
- Leonnig, Carol; Rucker, Philip (2021). I Alone Can Fix It: Donald J. Trump's Catastrophic Final Year. London: Penguin Press. ISBN 9781526642639.

Government offices
Preceded by Christopher A. Wray	Director of the Federal Bureau of Investigation; 2025–present	Incumbent
Preceded by Marvin G. Richardson; Acting	Director of the Bureau of Alcohol, Tobacco, Firearms and Explosives; Acting; 2025	Succeeded by Daniel P. Driscoll; Acting
