= Alexis Wilkins =

American singer (born 1998)

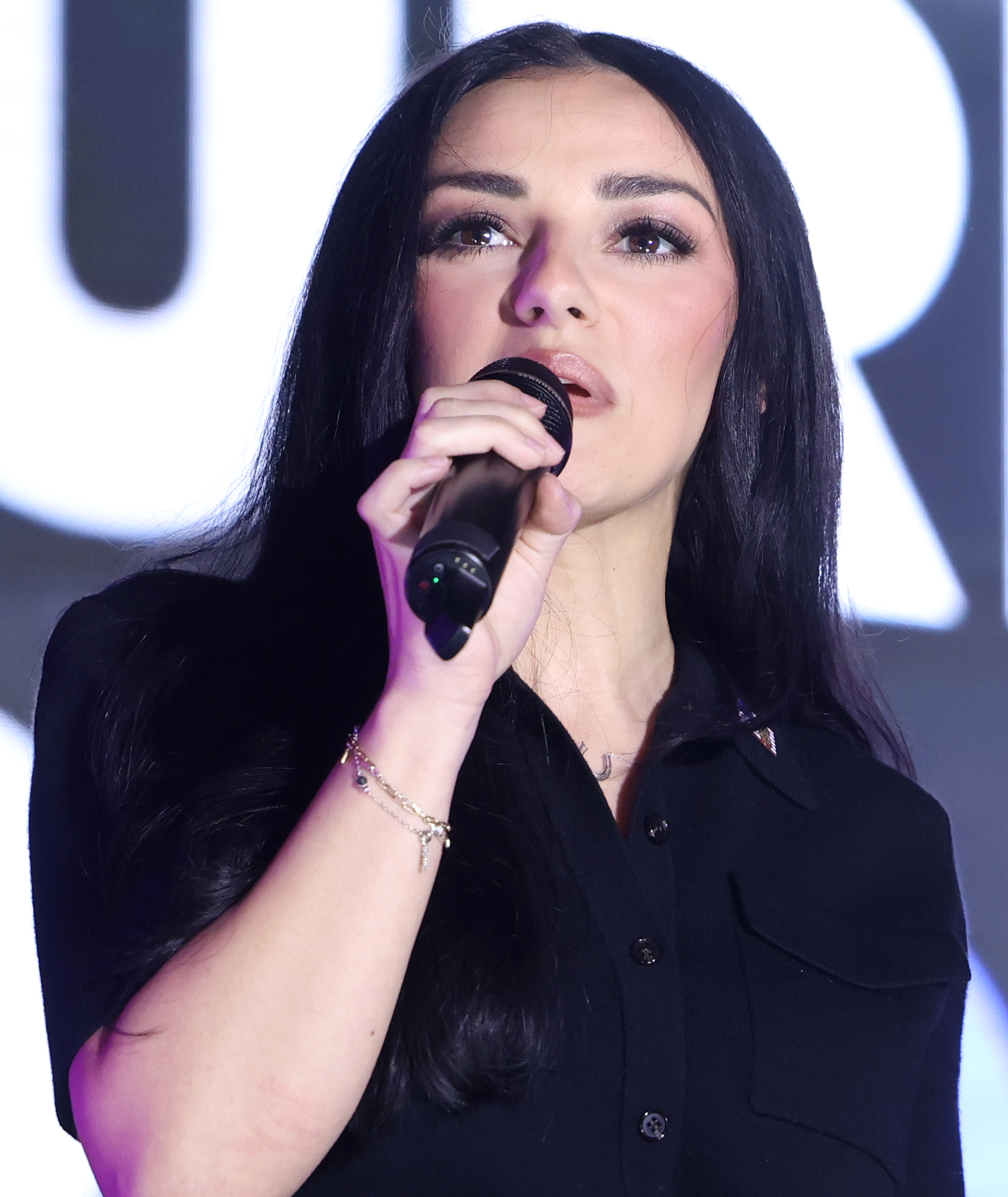
- Wilkins in 2025
- Born: November 3, 1998 (age 27); Boston, Massachusetts, U.S.
- Education: Belmont University (BBA)
- Occupations: Singer, actress
- Partner: Kash Patel (2023–present)
- Website: alexiswilkins.com

Alexis Wilkins (born November 3, 1998) is an American country singer and actress. Since 2023, she has also become known for dating Kash Patel, FBI Director in the Trump Administration.

== Biography ==
Wilkins was born on November 3, 1998, in Boston, Massachusetts, to a mother who was a financial specialist in the aerospace industry and a father who was a global consumer products executive for the Gillette Company. She is of Armenian descent. She is an only child and was raised Christian. They lived in the Boston suburb of Weymouth. According to Wilkins, she grew up in Arkansas after having lived in Windsor, Berkshire, and in Switzerland, where she attended elementary school at the Collège du Léman boarding school for a time. As a child, she also appeared in bit parts on two episodes of Modern Family, a television sitcom filmed in Los Angeles, California.

Wilkins graduated from Belmont University in 2020, receiving a Bachelor of Business Administration.

In December 2024, Wilkins announced that she would begin to work as the press secretary for Representative Abraham Hamadeh.

In October 2025, Wilkins performed the national anthem before RAF 02 in State College, Pennsylvania.

=== Lawsuits ===
In November 2025, Wilkins filed a $5 million defamation lawsuit in the U.S. District Court for the District of Utah against Samuel Parker, a former banker and social media influencer, who had run in the 2018 Utah Senate Republican primary. Wilkins alleged that he had falsely claimed she was an Israeli spy. In August 2026, a federal judge in the U.S. District Court for the District of Utah ruled in Parker's favor, finding the case had not been filed in the proper jurisdiction; the ruling did not address whether Parker's statements were defamatory. The jurisdictional issue was that Wilkins lives in Tennessee and Parker lives in Washington state, and therefore Utah was the wrong state to sue in.

Wilkins also filed two defamation lawsuits against conservative influencers Kyle Seraphin and Elijah Schaffer. Schaffer responded to Wilkins's lawsuit, calling it "delusional and paranoid".

== Personal life ==
In October 2022, Wilkins met Kash Patel, then a board member of Trump Media & Technology Group, at an event as part of the ReAwaken America Tour. Since 2023, she has dated Patel, who became FBI Director in the Trump Administration in 2025. Wilkins and Patel got engaged in October 2026.

Wilkins has been the center of controversies involving Patel. Patel was criticized for using taxpayer funds to pay for his personal travels to visit Wilkins. These trips included visiting her performances and attending "date nights." Additionally, Patel has reportedly assigned himself and Wilkins security resources that the New York Times described as "exceeds the bounds of standard practice", including an FBI SWAT unit to serve as her security detail.

On March 13, 2026, Alden Welch Ruml, a 26-year-old man from Massachusetts, was arrested and charged by federal prosecutors in Boston for making profane and violent threats against Wilkins.

== Filmography ==
Year	Title	Credited as	Notes
2009	Modern Family	Party Guest/Fencer	2 episodes; uncredited
2011	The Victorville Massacre	Young Lane	
2011	Jack and Jill	Sistine Chapel Girl	Uncredited
2012	Dog with a Blog	Tiff	Episode: "Dog with a Hog"
2013	Instant Mom	Lola	Episode: "Yoot There It Is"
2014	The First Minute	Denise	Short film
2016	The Crooked Man	Alice	Television film
2017	Painted Horses	Zoey	
