= Will Curry =

Squatter at Stanford University

- Born: Birmingham, Alabama
- Known for: Squatting at Stanford University

William Curry is an American man who illegally lived at several dormitories at Stanford University on several occasions from 2021 to 2023.

== Early life and education ==
Curry was born and raised in Birmingham, Alabama. As a middle and high school student, he ran track. He graduated from Vestavia Hills High School in 2021.

== Stanford ==
After graduating from high school, Curry moved to Palo Alto, California and signed up for Tinder in order to meet new people. From 2021 to 2023, he then illegally took up residence in several dormitories across Stanford University. He did so through breaking in windows, using other students' ID cards, and currying favor with actual students in each building.

=== 2021 ===
For the 2021 fall quarter, Curry illegally resided in the Yost House at Stanford University and was removed months later by on-campus security.

Curry then returned for winter break, in December 2021, and lived in nearby Roble Hall until he was removed once more, claiming that he was an unhoused person.

=== 2022 ===
In January 2022, Curry moved into Murray House and described himself as a transfer student from Duke University. He socialized with other students and even made dating app and social media profiles to integrate. Curry also told a woman he had been dating at the time that he lived off-campus and was a Coca-Cola Scholar. Their relationship ended by June, after which he began stalking and harassing her.

In the fall of 2022, Curry moved from Murray House to EAST House, claiming that he was on the track team and studying pre-med. Months later, in October, Curry was caught living on-campus in Crothers Hall and given a "stay away order after allegedly taking a television from the dorm basement."

According to Theo Baker in The Stanford Daily, Curry was removed several times from campus with stay away orders and even faced a harassment complaint reported to police, but "The University kept silent." While university officials maintained close communications with individual dorms following each of Curry's intrusions, they didn't communicate with other dorms, thus allowing Curry to move into them undetected.

As of November 2022, it was reported that the Santa Clara County District Attorney's Office was reviewing Curry's case. In the same month, the university made its first statement regarding Curry, acknowledging that there were "gaps" in its protocols "in place to prevent non-students from entering and living in our residences."

=== 2023 ===
In April 2023, Curry returned to the Murray House, using the fake name "David," and was caught shortly after due to sightings reported to the university.
