= Charlie Ward (content creator) =

British right-wing content creator (born 1960)

- Born: June 8, 1960 (age 66); Ipswich, England
- Occupations: Content creator, businessman
- Known for: QAnon promotion, conspiracy theories
- Website: https://charlieward.tv/about-me/

Charlie Ward (born June 8, 1960) is a British right-wing content creator, conspiracy theorist and businessman known for promoting QAnon-related conspiracy theories and controversial claims about COVID-19 and finance. He resides in Spain and operates a YouTube channel and other social media accounts with a significant following.

== Career ==
Ward gained prominence during the COVID-19 pandemic by producing and sharing conspiracy theory content online. He hosts The Charlie Ward Show, where he discusses various topics, often related to QAnon theories, COVID-19 skepticism and financial advice.

As of September 2020, Ward had over 170,000 subscribers on YouTube and 80,000 on Bitchute, a video-sharing platform popular among conspiracy theorists.

Ward is the person with significant control of Dr Charlie Ward LTD, a company registered in the United Kingdom. He owns 75% or more of the shares and voting rights and has the right to appoint or remove directors.

== Views and controversies ==
=== QAnon promotion ===
Ward is described as a "prominent QAnon promoter" and has been associated with the spread of QAnon-related conspiracy theories. He has appeared at events like the ReAwaken America Tour, which has been linked to QAnon and other conspiracy theories.

=== COVID-19 and vaccine misinformation ===
Ward has been involved in spreading misinformation about the COVID-19 pandemic and vaccines. Fact-checking organizations have debunked several claims made by Ward regarding the pandemic.

=== Financial advice controversies ===
Ward has promoted the purchase of gold and silver through Bullion By Post, a UK-based precious metals retailer. His promotions have raised concerns about potential violations of financial regulations.

== Media coverage and public reception ==
Ward's activities have drawn attention from various media outlets and fact-checking organizations. He has been described as a key figure in the spread of conspiracy theories, particularly in the UK and Europe.

In May 2023, Ward was removed as a speaker from a ReAwaken America Tour event due to controversy over his praise of Adolf Hitler.
