= Greg Locke =

American evangelical pastor and exorcist

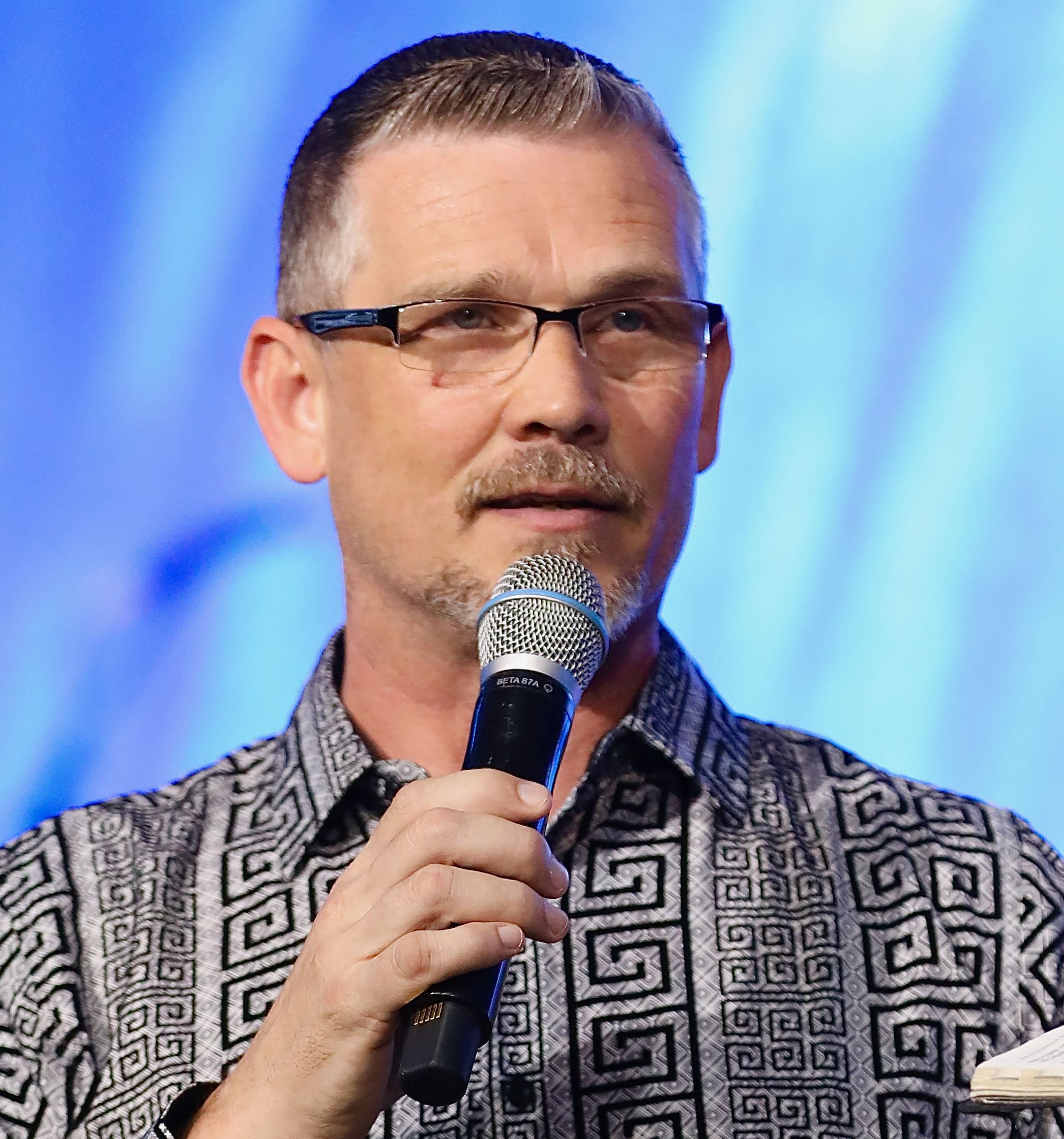
- Locke preaching at Global Vision Bible Church in May 2023
- Born: May 18, 1976 (age 50); Nashville, Tennessee, U.S.
- Occupation: Pastor
- Spouses: Melissa Biggers (m. 1996; div. 2018) Taisha McGee (m. 2018)
- Children: 4 (two biological; two adopted)

Gregory Duane Locke (born May 18, 1976) is an American non-denominational Charismatic preacher and pastor. He is the founder of Global Vision Bible Church in Lebanon, Tennessee. Locke became prominent on social media for making controversial statements, which included calling the COVID-19 pandemic a hoax and discouraging his congregation from wearing masks or being vaccinated. He was present at the 2021 United States Capitol attack and had encouraged his congregation to attend. In subsequent years, Locke became increasingly focused on exorcism and demonic possession, releasing a film on the topic, Come Out in Jesus Name, in 2023.

== Early life ==
Locke was born in Donelson Hospital in Nashville, Tennessee, in 1976. According to Locke, his father was imprisoned during his early childhood, and his mother remarried when he was five. Locke subsequently had a turbulent relationship with his stepfather.

Following multiple arrests as a juvenile, Locke was sent to a children's home in Murfreesboro, Tennessee, at the age of 15, where he converted to Christianity. As a teenager, he preached on a local radio station.

== Career ==
=== Founding of Global Vision Bible Church ===
Locke founded Global Vision Baptist Church in Mt Juliet, Tennessee, in 2006, later moving to another town in Wilson County late 2024, Lebanon, Tennessee. In 2011, the church officially separated from the Independent Baptist movement and changed its name to Global Vision Bible Church. Locke has been described as having a "flair for the theatrical," which included a four-day stint in a scissor lift to solicit donations for homeless people, and releasing a rap song under the name "Rev Rymz" to raise awareness of child trafficking.

=== Social media and political controversy ===
Locke began posting videos on social media, finding that, by his own account, "the controversial stuff really drove traffic." His first viral video was an angry response to the 2015 Supreme Court decision legalizing same-sex marriage. In 2016, he posted a Facebook video criticizing changes to Target's bathroom policy. Locke cultivated the image of an "old-school, over-the-top pastor with a country twang," with such stunts as fastening a bible to a baseball bat and demolishing a pink dollhouse onstage.

In 2016, Locke co-founded Locke Media with former journalist Wayne Caparas, whom he met at a Las Vegas get-out-the-vote event.

During the COVID-19 pandemic, Locke kept his church open and publicly claimed that the pandemic was a hoax. He stated that those who wore masks to church services would be asked to leave, and discouraged vaccination among his congregation. His sermons during this period incorporated QAnon conspiracy theories and claims of an "unholy plot" by political figures against Christians. He also promoted the "Stop the Steal" campaign following the 2020 United States presidential election.

Locke was present during the January 6, 2021, attack on the United States Capitol, having encouraged his congregation to travel to Washington, D.C. He was scheduled to speak before Donald Trump at the Ellipse but did not ultimately do so; he did deliver sermons at Freedom Plaza on January 5 and near the Capitol steps during the riot. Afterward, Locke condemned the violence but maintained, without providing evidence, that it had been instigated by antifa agitators.

In September 2021, Locke was permanently suspended from Twitter; his account was later reinstated. As of April 2022, Locke's combined social media following numbered in the millions. Locke has been a speaker at multiple stops on the pro-Trump ReAwaken America Tour, which promotes conspiracy theories about vaccines and the 2020 presidential election.

=== Focus on exorcism and demonic possession ===
Following the end of the Trump administration, Locke shifted his public ministry's focus toward exorcism and demonic possession. On January 23, 2022, during a sermon, Locke asserted that conditions such as obsessive-compulsive disorder and autism spectrum disorder "could be" manifestations of demonic influence, stating: "Are you telling me my kid's possessed? No. I'm telling you your kid could be demonized and attacked but your doctor calls it autism." This drew condemnation from advocates for neurodivergent people and from the Autism Faith Network.

On February 2, 2022, Locke organized a burning of books and materials related to witchcraft and the occult, including novels from the Twilight and Harry Potter series. On February 13, 2022, during a subsequent sermon, Locke claimed to have identified six "witches" within his congregation during an exorcism and threatened to expose their names publicly.

=== Come Out in Jesus Name (2023) ===
Locke served as executive producer and subject of the documentary film Come Out in Jesus Name, released in March 2023 through Fathom Events. The film chronicled the ministries of deliverance ministers including Alexander Pagani, Isaiah Saldivar, and Mike Signorelli, culminating at Locke's revival tent in Tennessee. In a statement to The Christian Post, Locke expressed a desire to shift away from politics, saying that he had been "misdirected by focusing on things not in the spiritual realm." The film earned approximately $2.5 million at the box office.

=== Advocation for violence against Palestinians ===
During the early weeks of the Israeli military campaign in Gaza in October and November 2023, Locke publicly advocated for violence against Palestinians, called for missiles to destroy the Dome of the Rock, and described Islam as a Satanic cult.

=== Burning Bible attack ===
On March 31, 2024, on Easter Sunday, an unidentified man parked a trailer loaded with Bibles near an intersection adjacent to Locke's church and intentionally set it alight, according to the local sheriff's office. Locke stated that the act "was most assuredly directed at us" and characterized it as evidence that Christianity is "under attack more than ever before in the United States of America."

=== Alleged FBI raid ===
In July 2026, Locke said that approximately 60 federal agents had raided his home and searched the offices of Locke Media as part of an investigation into allegations including the misappropriation of church funds. According to Locke, agents seized electronic devices and financial records, and he said that he had been told that he had been under investigation for about two years. He denied wrongdoing and said that he and Global Vision Bible Church had "nothing to hide". The Christian Post reported that the FBI's Tennessee field office did not immediately confirm whether it was involved in the investigation.

== Personal life ==
Locke met his first wife, Melissa Biggers, at Good Shepherd Children's Home, where he was a ward of the state and she was a staff member. The two became engaged in 1995. They have four children, two of whom are adopted. In January 2018, Locke announced via Facebook that he and Biggers had separated; their divorce was finalized in May 2018. Locke married Tai Cowan McGee later that same year; prior to their marriage, she had served as his administrative assistant. Locke has repeatedly denied any suggestions of infidelity.

On September 3, 2024, Locke's family residence was struck by gunfire. Police found between 30 and 40 bullet shell casings on the property; shots had been fired into the garage, house windows, and a family vehicle, with one bullet striking a pillow in a bedroom. A family member was home at the time but was not injured. Locke arrived shortly after the attack, and the family stayed at a hotel that night as a precaution. A local man, Tyler Poole, later pleaded guilty to one count of aggravated assault and two counts of reckless endangerment. Prosecutors stated the incident stemmed from a personal dispute involving Locke's stepson and was unrelated to Locke's ministry.

On March 3, 2026, Locke was arrested in Lebanon, Tennessee, on a charge of driving with a suspended license and was released shortly thereafter. On May 8th 2026, Greg Locke announced on social media that his 20-year-old son Evan–who had struggled in the past with addiction–had died of an overdose.

== Published works ==
- Leyton, Bonnie; Locke, Greg (1998). Bearing Witness (1st ed.). Unknown location: MRI Digital Print. ISBN 0968128416.
- Locke, Greg (2005). Blinded by Benny (1st ed.). Murfreesboro, TN: Sword of the Lord Publishers. ISBN 0873980948.
- Locke, Greg (2020). This Means War: We Will Not Surrender Through Silence (1st ed.). Mt. Juliet, TN: Locke Media Publishing. ISBN 173584621X.
- Locke, Greg (2022). Revival (1st ed.). Mt. Juliet, TN: Locke Media Publishing. ISBN 1735846279.
- Locke, Greg (2023). Accessing Your Anointing: Understanding the Spiritual Gifts (1st ed.). Lake Mary, FL: Charisma House. ISBN 1636413463.
- Locke, Greg (2023). Cast It Out: The Call to Set People Free. Spiritual Warfare (1st ed.). Lake Mary, FL: Charisma Media. ISBN 1636413412.
- Locke, Greg (2023). Weapons of Our Warfare: Unleashing the Power of the Armor of God (1st ed.). Lake Mary, FL: Charisma House. ISBN 1636413447.
- Locke, Greg (2024). The Generosity Journey: When God Can Trust You He Will Bless You (1st ed.). Lake Mary, FL: Charisma House. ISBN 1636414052.
- Locke, Greg (2025). Accessing Your Anointing Study Guide: Understanding the Spiritual Gifts (1st ed.). Mt. Juliet, TN: Locke Media Publishing. ISBN 1735846287.

== Filmography ==
- Come Out in Jesus Name, documentary film, 2023 (executive producer)
