= The Divider =

2022 book about the Trump presidency

The Divider: Trump in the White House, 2017–2021
- Author: Peter Baker; Susan Glasser
- Language: English
- Genre: Non-Fiction
- Publisher: Doubleday
- Publication date: September 20, 2022
- Publication place: United States
- Pages: 752
- ISBN: 978-0-385-54653-9

The Divider: Trump in the White House, 2017–2021 is a 2022 book by American journalists Peter Baker and Susan Glasser. It details the first presidency of Donald Trump, with a focus on the divisions that occurred both among the White House staff and with international partners.
