= Clay Clark =

American entrepreneur and podcast host

Clay Clark (born Clayton Thomas Clark, November 5, 1980) is an American business educator, musician, and former mayoral candidate in Tulsa, Oklahoma. He hosts the ThriveTime Show and co-founded the ReAwaken America Tour with Michael Flynn.

== Early life and education ==
Clark was born Clayton Thomas Clark on November 5, 1980. He attended St. Cloud State University, Oral Roberts University, and Oklahoma State University.

== Career ==
He is best known as the founder of Thrive15.com, an online education platform, and as the host of the ThriveTime Show, a business podcast. In 2023, Clark was the subject of a defamation lawsuit for comments that he made on his podcast. Clark is the former United States Small Business Administration (SBA) Entrepreneur of the Year for the state of Oklahoma.

Clark started his career by founding DJ Connection (DJConnection.com) out of his Oral Roberts University dorm room in 1999. He worked as a wedding and party disc jockey under the nickname "DJ Clay".

In 2012, Clark co-founded The Elephant In The Room Men's Grooming Lounge (EITRLounge.com), a men's barbering and grooming establishment. It currently has multiple locations across Oklahoma.

Clark founded Thrive15.com, an online video-based education platform, in 2014. Former NBA player David Robinson took an equity stake in the company and contributed instructional videos.

Between 1999 and 2022, Clark has founded, co-founded, or partnered with multiple businesses, including Epic Photos, Make Your Life Epic, the ReAwaken America Tour, the Tulsa Bridal Association Bridal Show, and Tip Top K9 Franchising.

Clark has served as a consultant for companies such as Hewlett Packard, Farmers Insurance, eXp Realty, UPS, O'Reilly Auto Parts, Maytag University, and OXIFresh.

== Political activity ==
In 2009, Clark announced a campaign for mayor of Tulsa as a conservative Republican. He withdrew in July 2009 before filing for the office, endorsed fellow Republican Chris Medlock, and joined Medlock's campaign.

In August 2020, Clark and optometrist Robert Zoellner led a group of business owners in filing a federal lawsuit challenging Tulsa's COVID-19 mask mandate.

In 2021, Clark and Michael Flynn launched the ReAwaken America Tour, a series of events for which Clark serves as organizer and MC. The tour grew out of anti-lockdown gatherings Clark had hosted during the COVID-19 pandemic. The tour brought together conservative Christians.
