= Theo Baker =

American investigative journalist (b. 2005)

- Born: January 2005 (age 21); District of Columbia
- Education: Stanford University (BA)
- Organization: The Stanford Daily
- Parents: Peter Baker; Susan Glasser
- Website: https://theobaker.info/

Theo Baker (born January 2005) is an American journalist, who is best known for his reporting that led to the resignation of Stanford president Marc Tessier-Lavigne. In 2023, he became the youngest recipient of the George Polk Award for that reporting.

Baker joined the San Francisco Standard in 2026 to cover AI.

== Early life and education ==
Baker is from the Washington, D.C., area and is the son of journalists Peter Baker of The New York Times and Susan Glasser of The New Yorker. His paternal great-grandparents were Greek immigrants who anglicized their surname from Bakirtzoglous. He attended high school at Phillips Academy in Andover, Massachusetts.

He matriculated at Stanford University in 2022, when he was 17, and joined The Stanford Daily. He graduated in June 2026 with a degree in History and Computer Science.

== Reporting ==
As a freshman reporter at The Stanford Daily, Baker began publishing stories in November, 2022, about accusations that Stanford president Marc Tessier-Lavigne was an author on research papers containing altered images, leading to a formal investigation from the university. Baker learned about the accusations through the scientific review website PubPeer and brought them to scientific integrity expert Elisabeth Bik. A lawyer representing Tessier-Lavigne sent letters to Baker, describing his reporting as "replete with falsehoods."

In July 2023, the final university report found that Tessier-Lavigne's research "fell below customary standards of scientific rigor and process" but did not constitute fraud. Baker subsequently published another story that the investigating panel did not grant some witnesses anonymity, so they were unable to testify because of active non-disclosure agreements. Tessier-Lavigne announced his resignation as Stanford's president on July 19, 2023, with multiple major news outlets, including The New York Times and The Washington Post, saying it was a direct result of the Stanford Daily stories.

In late March 2024, an article by Baker titled "The War at Stanford" was published in The Atlantic. The article discussed the response of Stanford University to the 2023 Hamas-led attack on Israel, arguing that the attack was not adequately condemned. Similarly, Baker asserted that pro-Palestine students' rhetoric led to antisemitism and created a culture of fear for Jews on campus. The article also mentioned an instance where a Stanford student allegedly advocated for violence against President Biden; the student's naming was denounced by some, such as journalist Glenn Greenwald, as a form of doxxing. The article was criticized by others on the basis of its portrayal of student protestors, alleging a biased narrative ignoring islamophobia and the plight of Palestinians. Jonathan Chait later published a piece in New York Magazine responding to this criticism, suggesting progressive attacks were motivated by viewpoints outside the mainstream and that critics were espousing "illiberal left-wing thought".

Baker took two terms off in his junior year to write a book about Stanford titled How to Rule the World, published by Penguin Press in 2026.

=== Awards ===
In February 2023, The Stanford Daily received one of the 2022 George Polk Awards for its reporting on Tessier-Lavigne, the first time an independent, student-run newspaper has won the award. The Polk Awards gave Baker a "Special Award", making him the youngest ever Polk awardee. He has also received a James Madison Freedom of Information Award from the Northern California Chapter of the Society of Professional Journalists.

== Personal life ==
Baker has said that he was raised as a secular Jew and discovered when he was a teenager that dozens of relatives had died in the Holocaust.

Baker is the son of journalists Peter Baker and Susan Glasser. Some media articles alleged he was a "nepo baby", benefiting from the status of his parents in the journalistic world. He rejected the criticisms, saying while he was fortunate to have good role models, he strived to keep his parents' influence "entirely separate" from his reporting. He told Teen Vogue that he had previously said he would never become a journalist but changed his mind to "feel connected to [his] late grandfather, who passed just two weeks before [he] started at Stanford, and who would always sit down and talk about his time doing student journalism."
