= Peter Baker (journalist) =

American journalist and author (born 1967)

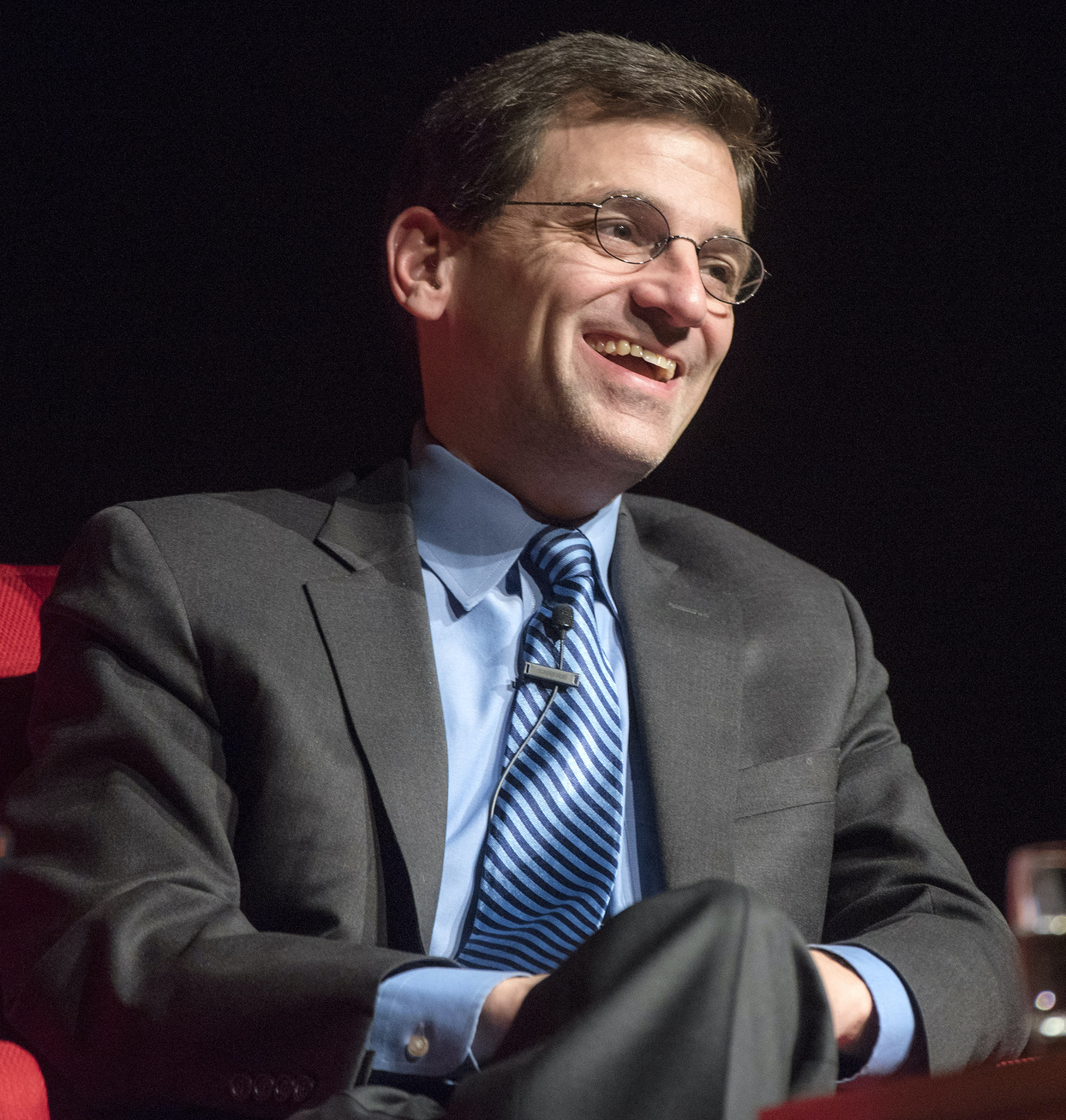
- Baker in 2017
- Born: Peter Eleftherios Baker; July 2, 1967 (age 59)
- Education: Oberlin College (attended)
- Occupations: Journalist, author
- Employers: The Washington Post (1988–2008); The New York Times (2008–present)
- Notable work: Days of Fire: Bush and Cheney in the White House (2012); The Divider: Trump in the White House, 2017-2021 (2022)
- Spouse: Susan Glasser (m. 2000)
- Children: Theo Baker

Peter Eleftherios Baker (born July 2, 1967) is an American journalist and author. He is the chief White House correspondent for The New York Times and a political analyst for MS NOW. He was a reporter for The Washington Post for 20 years. He has covered six presidencies, from Bill Clinton through Donald Trump.

== Early life and education ==
Baker was born in 1967, the son of tax attorney Eleftherios Peter ("Ted") Baker, whose "impoverished Greek immigrant" parents were originally surnamed "Bakirtzoglous", and computer programmer Linda (later Sinrod), daughter of electrical engineer and x-ray technology expert Malvern J. Gross. Baker attended Oberlin College near Cleveland, Ohio from 1984 to 1986, where he worked as a reporter and editor for the student newspaper, The Oberlin Review. He left Oberlin at the school's insistence because according to him, he "was not a good student." Baker never completed the coursework for an earned degree, although he was granted an honorary Doctor of Fine Arts by the school in 2021.

== Career ==
After attending college, though not graduating, Baker worked for The Washington Times for two years. He joined The Washington Post in 1988 as a reporter covering Virginia news. He was there for 20 years, covering the White House during the presidencies of Bill Clinton and George W. Bush. During his first tour at the White House, Baker co-authored the paper's first story about the Clinton-Lewinsky scandal and was the paper's lead writer during the impeachment battle which ensued. He then published his first book, The Breach: Inside the Impeachment and Trial of William Jefferson Clinton through Scribner, a New York Times bestseller based on his coverage of the impeachment proceedings in Congress. During his next White House assignment, he covered the travails of Bush's second term, from the Iraq War and Hurricane Katrina to Supreme Court nomination fights and the economy.

In between the stints at the White House, Baker and his wife, Susan Glasser, were bureau chiefs in Moscow for four years chronicling the rise of Vladimir Putin, the rollback of Russian democracy, the Second Chechen War, and the Beslan school hostage crisis. Baker also covered the wars in Afghanistan and Iraq. He was the first American newspaper journalist to report from rebel-held northern Afghanistan after September 11, 2001. For the next eight months he reported on the overthrow of the Taliban and the emergence of a new government. He later was in the Middle East for six months, reporting from inside Saddam Hussein's Iraq and around the region before embedding with the U.S. Marines on the drive to Baghdad.

In May 2005, Baker published his second book, Kremlin Rising: Vladimir Putin's Russia and the End of Revolution through Scribner, co-written with Glasser, a detailed accounting of Putin's consolidation of power during his first term as president of Russia. It was named one of the Best Books of 2005 by The Washington Post Book World. While serving as White House correspondent for The Washington Post, he won the Gerald R. Ford Journalism Prize for Distinguished Reporting on the Presidency in 2007 for his "exceptionally trenchant appraisal" of the achievements and shortfalls of the second year of George W. Bush's second term in office.

In 2008, after 20 years with The Washington Post, Baker began working for The New York Times. He received the 2011 Aldo Beckman Memorial Award for his "remarkable run" of detailed coverage of the second year of President Obama's first term. Baker again won the Gerald R. Ford Journalism Prize for Distinguished Reporting on the Presidency and the Aldo Beckman Memorial Award in 2015. In October 2013, he published his third book, Days of Fire: Bush and Cheney in the White House through Doubleday, a detailed narrative account of the two-term presidency of George W. Bush. It was listed as one of the 10 Best Books of 2013 by The New York Times Book Review. In June 2017, he published his fourth book, Obama: The Call of History through New York Times/Callaway, a coffeetable book about Obama's two terms in office. In November 2017, it was nominated for an NAACP Image Award for Outstanding Literary Work – Biography/Autobiography.

After being briefly assigned as the Jerusalem bureau chief for the Times, in December 2016, Baker was reassigned back to the White House beat for the incoming administration of President Donald Trump. In October 2018, Baker published a book with Random House entitled Impeachment: An American History, along with Jon Meacham, Timothy Naftali, and Jeffrey A. Engel. An updated and expanded version of Obama: The Call of History was published in May 2019. Baker and Glasser wrote a biography of former Secretary of State James Baker published by Doubleday in September 2020.

In addition to his work for MSNBC, Baker is a regular panelist on PBS's Washington Week. In September 2022, a third book co-written with Glasser, The Divider: Trump in the White House, 2017-2021, was published.

== Works ==
- The Breach: Inside the Impeachment and Trial of William Jefferson Clinton. Simon & Schuster. 2000. ISBN 978-0-7432-1293-9.
- Baker, Peter; Glasser, Susan (2005). Kremlin Rising: Vladimir Putin's Russia and the End of Revolution. Simon & Schuster. ISBN 978-0-7432-8179-9.
- Days of Fire: Bush and Cheney in the White House. Knopf Doubleday. 2013. ISBN 978-0-385-53692-9.
- Obama: The Call of History. Harry N. Abrams. 2017. ISBN 978-0-935-11290-0.
- Impeachment: An American History. Random House. 2018. ISBN 978-1984853783
- Baker, Peter; Glasser, Susan (2020). The Man Who Ran Washington. Doubleday. ISBN 978-0-385-54055-1.
- Baker, Peter; Glasser, Susan (September 20, 2022). The Divider: Trump in the White House, 2017-2021. Knopf Doubleday Publishing Group. ISBN 978-0-385-54654-6.

== Personal life ==
In 2000, he married Susan Glasser in a civil ceremony. Susan has been a reporter and assistant managing editor at The Washington Post, the editor-in-chief of Foreign Policy magazine, the founding editor of Politico Magazine, the editor of Politico, and a global affairs analyst for CNN. She is a staff writer for The New Yorker and she wrote its "Letter from Trump's Washington" column. They live in Washington, D.C.

Their son, Theo Baker, is the youngest person to win a Polk Award for reporting – when he was eighteen and a freshman at Stanford University – allegations that some research papers by Marc Tessier-Lavigne, then the president of Stanford University, had manipulated images.
