= ReAwaken America Tour =

American religious and political protest movement

The ReAwaken America Tour is an American far-right and Christian nationalist movement launched in 2021 by Oklahoma entrepreneur Clay Clark and former Donald Trump national security advisor Michael Flynn. Its rallies have promoted a variety of conspiracy theories, including COVID-19 misinformation, election denialism, QAnon, and doomsday prophecies.

== Founder ==
The ReAwaken America tour was founded by Clay Clark, a business coach and entrepreneur and former mayoral candidate in Tulsa, Oklahoma. In August 2020, Clark initiated a lawsuit against the city of Tulsa for its mask mandate to help prevent the spread of COVID-19. The lawsuit alleged that wearing masks caused oxygen deprivation, leading to "migraine headaches, shortness of breath and dizziness." The lawsuit was dropped in March 2021.

Clark has publicly espoused his belief in COVID-19 conspiracy theories. When he spoke at the January 5, 2021, rally held at Freedom Plaza in Washington, D.C. in support of Donald Trump's protest of the outcome of the 2020 U.S. presidential election, Clark told attendees that the coronavirus pandemic was a hoax and instructed them to "turn to the person next to you and give them a hug, someone you don't know. Go hug somebody. Go ahead and spread it out, mass spreader. It's a mass-spreader event!"

On a June 2021 episode of the Stew Peters Show, he argued that the COVID-19 vaccine contained luciferase, which he believed was a cryptocurrency technology associated with the Mark of the Beast prophesied in Revelation 13:16–18. This conspiracy theory, according to Clark, included Bill Gates (under the influence of performance artist and alleged Satanist Marina Abramović), and Jeffrey Epstein. Clark accused Gates and Epstein of attempting to create a new race of humans by combining luciferase and Epstein's DNA into the COVID-19 vaccine.

At an October 2021 rally in Salt Lake City, Utah, Clark made the unproven claim that "COVID-19 is 100 percent treatable using budesonide, hydroxychloroquine and ivermectin." He also accused George Soros of funding remdesivir, a drug used to treat severe cases of COVID-19 but which Clark said was "killing COVID-19 patients in the hospital because it causes renal failure".

== Background and itinerary ==
=== Origins ===
According to Clark, as the COVID-19 pandemic began in early 2020, he asked God, "What can I do to stop the quarantines, the curfews, the mandates, the lockdowns?" The answer he received, Clark said, with "100% of God-ordained clarity . . . was to begin reawakening America." Despite the religious origins of the tour, it has been criticized by major Christian leaders.

In the spring of 2021, Clark inaugurated the "Health and Freedom" events to protest COVID-19 mitigation measures such as masking and vaccinations. According to Clark, he was inspired to undertake the tour by a 1963 prophecy by Charismatic minister Kenneth E. Hagin, who predicted that "there would be an atheistic, communist, Marxist and racially divisive spirit that would descend upon America" and that "the spark of the revival would start from Tulsa, Oklahoma." Clark also stated that he received confirmation of his importance from a 2013 prophecy by the South-African Charismatic evangelist Kim Clement, who identified a "Mr. Clark" about whom he believed God said: "You have been determined through your prayers to influence this nation. You're watching me; you're an influential person. The Spirit of God says, 'Hear the word of the prophet to you as a king, I will open that door that you prayed about.'"

=== Themes ===
Religion scholars Anthea Butler and Mark Clatterbuck note the events' Charismatic Christian prophecies and preaching are linked to the New Apostolic Reformation (NAR), a loosely organized, networked Independent Charismatic Christian and dominionist movement. NAR leaders played a significant role in shaping the tour's spiritual warfare tone; NAR prophet Lance Wallnau was one such speaker. It has been described as a "political rally in the form of an apostolic revival" and has included baptisms. As of January 2023, the majority of the ReAwaken America events have been held at churches.

Events have featured themes such as Trumpism, the Great Reset, anti-semitism, a globalist conspiracy, and the use of the COVID-19 pandemic to control the population (Plandemic). Booths promote information on purported biblical prophecies, John Birch Society material, as well as the anti-semitic work The Protocols of the Elders of Zion.

=== 2021 ===
In the summer of 2021, the "Health and Freedom" events were rebranded the ReAwaken America Tour, sponsored by Charismatic Christian magazine Charisma News. In an interview with Rolling Stone, Clark cited a meeting with Michael Flynn—a frequent guest on the tour—as the impetus for turning the Health and Freedom events into a tour, with Clark telling Flynn that "God wants us to do a tour" and Flynn agreeing. While the events (under both names) initially received attention for their opposition to COVID-19 mitigation measures, from the beginning, they also focused significant attention on supporting conspiracy theories related to the 2020 presidential election, including those espoused by QAnon followers.

During the November event held at Cornerstone Church in San Antonio, Texas, Clark reportedly led attendees in the "Let's Go Brandon!" chant, a euphemism used in place of the more explicit "Fuck Joe Biden!" At the same event, Flynn stated, "If we are going to have one nation under God, which we must, we have to have one religion. One nation under God, and one religion under God."

At the December event held at Elevate Life Church in Dallas, Texas, several speakers, including Joe Oltmann and Jovan Hutton Pulitzer, became ill. Oltmann claimed that he was "99%" sure that his symptoms were from contact with anthrax. Clark denied the accusation, saying that what some people believed was an anthrax attack was actually just a fog machine. He also denied being part of the Illuminati.

In December 2021, Eric Coomer, a former executive at Dominion Voting Systems, filed a federal defamation lawsuit against Clark, his ThriveTime Show, and his ReAwaken America Tour for having "monetized a false election fraud narrative" that produced "a constant drumbeat of outright falsehoods intended to place [Eric] Coomer at the center of a conspiracy theory to defraud the American people." The suit alleges that Clark began his attacks in December 2020 during a podcast interview when he told Joe Oltmann that Coomer "could/should be put to death" for treason.

=== 2022 ===
In early 2022, Clay Clark began incorporating conspiracy theories about the Great Reset into the tour.

At the March event in San Diego, Michael Flynn said, "We need you to charge the machine gun nest…. Maybe I'm just asking you to dig a little bit deeper there or hold this side of the line, or form up cause we're gonna counterattack over here, and that counterattack is, we're gonna go after school boards." This language led some commentators to charge Flynn with inciting violence against educators for allegedly teaching critical race theory.

One of the themes speakers focused on in 2022 events was the alleged connection between supernatural activity and U.S. politics. At the March event in San Diego, for example, one speaker warned, "Do not be surprised if the Angel of Death shows up in Washington." At the May event in Myrtle Beach, Mark Burns told the audience, "You wanna get rid of Lindsey Graham? Then get rid of the demonic territory that's over the land." Roger Stone stated that "there is a Satanic portal above the White House" that first appeared after Joe Biden became president. Stone claimed that the portal "must be closed. And it will be closed by prayer."

In July 2022, the Main Street Armory in Rochester, New York, cancelled the ReAwaken America event scheduled there for dates in August, citing “the outpour[ing] of concern from our community.” Prior to its cancellation, the bands Japanese Breakfast and Joywave had cancelled events at the Main Street Armory, citing the scheduled ReAwaken America events.

=== 2023 ===
In 2023, two regular ReAwaken speakers, Scott McKay and Charlie Ward, became the subject of controversy for their antisemitic views and public praise of Adolf Hitler. Both men were dropped from the scheduled ReAwaken event at Trump National Doral. The Trump family refused to allow either one onto their property. McKay and Ward remain affiliated with ReAwaken in a broader capacity.

At the second conference at Trump National Doral, Malik Obama was dropped from the schedule for his pro-Hamas views.

Democratic presidential candidate Robert F. Kennedy Jr., who had spoken at ReAwaken events in the past, said he was no longer affiliated with the group and asked to have his photo taken off their website.

Media Matters reported in October that the tour was scheduled for a two-day appearance at the Trump National Doral Miami golf resort that month. Scheduled speakers included Trump family members, former administration officials, Trump attorneys and several others associated with conspiracy theories.

=== 2024 and the end of the tours ===
Only two ReAwaken conferences were held in 2024. No conferences have been held since October 2024, and no explanation has been given for the tour's demise.

== Event dates and locations ==
=== 2021 ===
| Date | Location | City | Type of event |
|---|---|---|---|
| April 16–17 | Rhema Bible College | Broken Arrow, Oklahoma | Regular |
| June 17–19 | The River Church | Tampa, Florida | Regular |
| July 17–18 | Influence Church | Anaheim, California | Regular |
| August 19–21 | Deltaplex Arena & Conference Center | Grand Rapids, Michigan | Regular |
| September 24–25 | Charis Christian Center | Colorado Springs, Colorado | Regular |
| November 11–13 | Cornerstone Church | San Antonio, Texas | Regular |
| December 2–3 | ThriveTime Show Office | Tulsa, Oklahoma | Business |
| December 9–11 | Elevate Life Church | Dallas, Texas | Regular |
| December 16–17 | ThriveTime Show Office | Tulsa, Oklahoma | Homeschool |

=== 2022 ===
| Date | Location | City | Type of event |
|---|---|---|---|
| January 14–15 | Dream City Church | Phoenix, Arizona | Regular |
| February 18–19 | Trinity Gospel Temple | Canton, Ohio | Regular |
| March 3–4 | ThriveTime Show Office | Tulsa, Oklahoma | Business |
| March 11–12 | Awaken Church | San Marcos, California | Regular |
| April 1–2 | River Church Salem | Salem, Oregon | Regular |
| May 13–14 | Carolina Opry Theater | Myrtle Beach, South Carolina | Regular |
| June 16–17 | ThriveTime Show Office | Tulsa, Oklahoma | Business |
| July 8–9 | Rock Church | Virginia Beach, Virginia | Regular |
| August 12–13 | Cornerstone Church | Batavia, New York | Regular |
| September 1–2 | ThriveTime Show Office | Tulsa, Oklahoma | Business |
| September 16–17 | Stateline Speedway | Post Falls, Idaho | Regular |
| October 21–22 | Spooky Nook Sports | Manheim, Pennsylvania | Regular |
| November 4–5 | Mansion Theatre for the Performing Arts | Branson, Missouri | Regular |
| November 10–11 | ThriveTime Show Office | Tulsa, Oklahoma | Business |

=== 2023 ===
| Date | Location | City | Type of event |
|---|---|---|---|
| January 20–21 | Global Vision Bible Church | Mt. Juliet, Tennessee | Regular |
| February 2–3 | ThriveTime Show Office | Tulsa, Oklahoma | Business |
| March 23 | ThriveTime Show Office | Tulsa, Oklahoma | Regular |
| April 13–14 | ThriveTime Show Office | Tulsa, Oklahoma | Business |
| May 12–13 | Trump National Doral | Miami, Florida | Regular |
| June 15–16 | ThriveTime Show Office | Tulsa, Oklahoma | Business |
| August 25–26 | Craig Ranch Amphitheater | Las Vegas, Nevada | Regular |
| September 7–8 | ThriveTime Show Office | Tulsa, Oklahoma | Business |
| October 13–14 | Trump National Doral | Miami, Florida | Regular |
| December 7–8 | ThriveTime Show Office | Tulsa, Oklahoma | Business |
| December 15–16 | International Agri-Center | Tulare, California | Regular |

=== 2024 ===
| Date | Location | City | Type of event |
|---|---|---|---|
| March 7–8 | ThriveTime Show Office | Tulsa, Oklahoma | Business |
| June 7–8 | Grace Christian Church | Detroit, Michigan | Regular |
| June 27–28 | ThriveTime Show Office | Tulsa, Oklahoma | Business |
| October 18-19 | The Farm at 95 | Selma, NC | Regular |

== List of speakers ==
The lineup of speakers at each tour event varied. The following is a partial list of 2021–2024 speakers:

- Roseanne Barr, comedian and actress
- Richard Bartlett, American physician
- Leon Benjamin, Chief Apostle and Presiding Prelate of New Life Harvest Churches
- Steve Cioccolanti, Australian pastor, author and YouTuber
- Ty Bollinger, American alternative medicine advocate
- Jim Breuer, comedian and former SNL cast member
- Mark Burns, American pastor and perennial South Carolina congressional candidate
- Patrick M. Byrne, former CEO of Overstock.com
- Mark Cabrera and Martha Cabrera, pastors at Revival Ministries International
- Jim Caviezel, American actor
- William Cook, American pastor and founder of America's Black Robe Regiment
- Liz Crokin, American journalist
- Sean Feucht, American activist and Christian singer-songwriter
- Michael Flynn, former U.S. Army general and former National Security Advisor
- Shannon Gilbert, Pastor, Revival Ministries International
- Simone Gold, U.S. doctor and anti-vaccine activist
- Paul Gosar, U.S. Representative (AZ)
- Bob Hall, Texas state senator
- Mark Victor Hansen, American motivational speaker and author
- Gene Ho, Donald Trump's former photographer and unsuccessful 2021 candidate for mayor of Myrtle Beach, South Carolina
- Seth Holehouse, YouTube influencer
- Phil Hotsenpiller, co-founder and senior pastor, Influence Church (Anaheim, California)
- Stella Immanuel, Cameroonian-American physician and pastor
- Jonathan Isaac, Orlando Magic basketball player
- Alex Jones, American radio host and conspiracy theorist
- Robert F. Kennedy Jr., American environmental lawyer and anti-vaccine activist (appointed United States Secretary of Health and Human Services in 2025)
- Alan Keyes, American politician and former U.S. presidential candidate
- Anna Khait, professional poker player and former Survivor contestant
- Charlie Kirk, American political activist and radio talk show host (deceased as of September 2025)
- Jackson Lahmeyer, Tulsa pastor and former candidate for the U.S. Senate
- Jimmy Levy, former American Idol contestant
- Aaron Lewis, Connecticut pastor and author
- Mike Lindell, American businessman and conservative political activist
- Greg Locke, Tennessee pastor
- Lara Logan, South African journalist and war correspondent
- Richard Mack, leader in Oath Keepers and founder of Constitutional Sheriffs and Peace Officers Association
- Jurgen Matthesius, lead pastor of Awaken Church in San Diego, California
- Peter A. McCullough, American cardiologist and anti-vaccine activist
- Scott McKay aka "Patriot Streetfighter", antisemitic Rumble personality
- Judy Mikovits, former American research scientist and anti-vaccine activist
- Peter Navarro, American economist and author
- Devin Nunes, chief executive officer of the Trump Media & Technology Group and former U.S. representative from California
- Kash Patel, lawyer and former Trump administration staffer (appointed Director of the Federal Bureau of Investigation in 2025)
- Ken Paxton, Texas attorney general (2015–present)
- Sidney Powell, American attorney
- Chad Prather, American Internet personality
- Wendy Rogers, Arizona state senator and conspiracy theorist
- Dave Scarlett, Pastor and founder, His Glory Ministries
- Owen Shroyer, InfoWars show host and conspiracy theorist
- Ian Smith, New Jersey fitness influencer and Holocaust denier
- Sam Sorbo, American actress and radio host
- Angela Stanton-King, reality TV show star, Congressional candidate in 2020, and QAnon conspiracy theorist
- Roger Stone, American political consultant and lobbyist
- Steve Strang, founder and CEO of Charisma News
- Melissa Tate, conservative author
- Eric Trump, son of U.S. President Donald J. Trump
- Carlo Maria Viganò, former Apostolic Nuncio to the United States (2011–2016)
- Andy Wakefield, former British physician
- James "Phil" Waldron, retired U.S. Army colonel and bar owner
- Charlie Ward, antisemitic Rumble personality
- Mikki Willis, American producer of Plandemic films
- Lin Wood, American attorney and conspiracy theorist
- Vladimir Zelenko, Ukrainian-American family physician
