= FBI Section 702 query violations =

FBI surveillance compliance failures

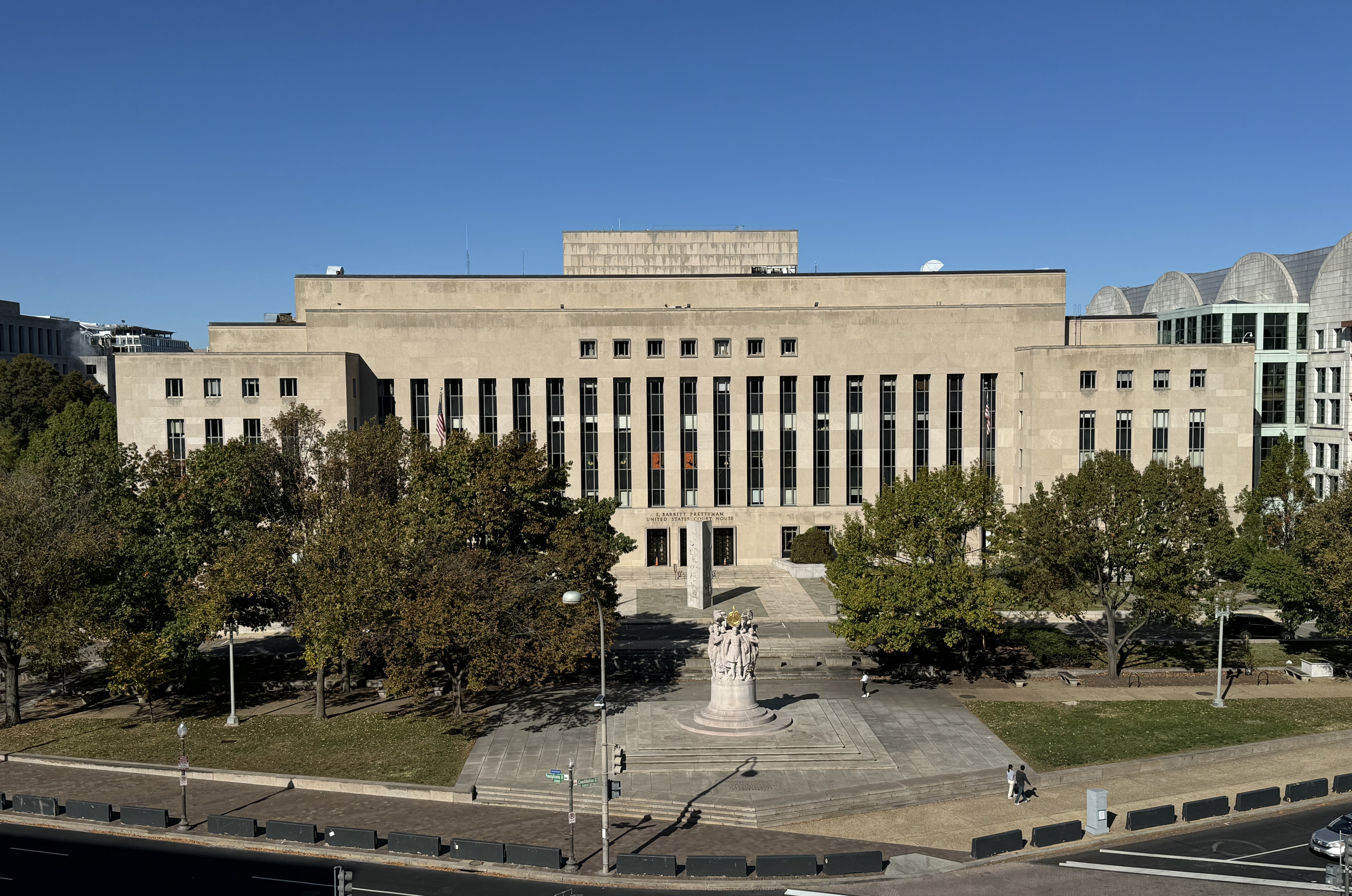
The E. Barrett Prettyman United States Courthouse, home to the Foreign Intelligence Surveillance Court since 2009

FBI Section 702 query violations were a series of compliance failures by the Federal Bureau of Investigation (FBI) involving warrantless searches of communications collected under Section 702 of the Foreign Intelligence Surveillance Act (FISA). Between 2020 and early 2022, Bureau personnel conducted more than 278,000 searches of surveillance databases that did not meet legal standards.

The queries targeted Black Lives Matter protesters, January 6 Capitol attack participants, congressional campaign donors, journalists, members of Congress, and crime victims. The Foreign Intelligence Surveillance Court (FISC) characterized these as "persistent and widespread violations". The revelations, disclosed publicly in May and July 2023 through declassified FISC opinions, triggered congressional debate over Section 702's April 2024 reauthorization. A proposed warrant requirement for such searches failed by a single vote in the House of Representatives.

== Background ==
Section 702 of FISA, enacted in 2008 as part of the FISA Amendments Act, authorizes targeted intelligence collection of foreign intelligence information from non-U.S. persons reasonably believed to be located outside the United States. Unlike traditional FISA warrants requiring individualized probable cause determinations, Section 702 operates through annual certifications approved by the FISC, which reviews general targeting, minimization, and querying procedures rather than individual surveillance targets. The National Security Agency (NSA), Central Intelligence Agency (CIA), FBI, and National Counterterrorism Center (NCTC) collect communications through two primary methods: PRISM (direct collection from internet service providers) and upstream collection (from internet backbone infrastructure).

Under the statute, intentionally targeting U.S. persons or anyone located in the United States or "reverse targeting" or surveilling foreigners in order to collect information about Americans is prohibited. However, when foreigners under Section 702 surveillance communicate with Americans, those U.S. person communications are "incidentally collected" and stored in intelligence databases. Intelligence agencies can then query these databases using American identifiers. These are known as "backdoor searches" or "U.S. person queries" to retrieve Americans' communications without obtaining warrants. By 2022, approximately 246,000 foreign targets were under Section 702 surveillance, increasing to 292,000 by 2024.

=== Intelligence value ===
The U.S. intelligence community and successive presidential administrations have described Section 702 as among the most valuable intelligence collection authorities available. FBI Director Christopher A. Wray told Congress in December 2023 that Section 702 had helped disrupt terrorist attacks, identify foreign spies, and track fentanyl shipments.

In a joint statement, DNI Avril Haines and NSA Director Paul Nakasone called Section 702 a source of "critical foreign intelligence" on threats including terrorism, weapons proliferation, and hostile cyber activities. CIA Director William Burns said the program had been crucial for stopping drug cartels moving fentanyl across the U.S. border, while Haines told lawmakers the law had helped counter China's spying efforts.

During the April 2024 reauthorization debate, intelligence officials briefed House members on specific cases including identification of a Chinese fentanyl precursor shipment 48 hours before arrival and disruption of a plot by Iranian operatives to assassinate a U.S. official on American soil. Attorney General Merrick Garland and national security adviser Jake Sullivan personally made calls to legislators urging them to vote against an amendment curtailing it.

Supporters argued that the FBI's U.S. person queries despite compliance failures produced actionable intelligence. In 2023, the FBI stated queries helped identify ransomware actors targeting U.S. critical infrastructure and foreign agents seeking to recruit Americans with security clearances. The Privacy and Civil Liberties Oversight Board, while recommending reforms, concluded that Section 702 "remains highly valuable to protect national security" and "has proven to be a valuable tool in the government's efforts to protect national security".

Critics countered that the intelligence community had not identified specific cases where warrantless searches of Americans' communications, rather than foreign target surveillance, proved essential to preventing attacks. They argued warrant requirements would not impede legitimate intelligence collection.

== Scale and timeline of violations ==
=== Early violations (2017–2018) ===
In 2019, the FISC rebuked the FBI for tens of thousands of improper searches.These included over 70,000 queries in March 2017 related to security reviews of people requiring FBI building access and 6,800 Social Security number queries on a single day in December 2017.

=== Peak violation period (2020–2021) ===
Compliance problems peaked between late 2020 and early 2021. Bureau analysts ran more than 278,000 queries of Section 702 data that the Department of Justice determined violated FBI standards. The searches failed to meet the legal standard requiring queries be "reasonably likely to retrieve foreign intelligence information or evidence of a crime".

=== Searches of political figures and donors ===
News reports on the declassified court documents revealed that an FBI analyst ran a batch query of over 19,000 donors to a congressional campaign. According to The Boston Globe, the analyst claimed the campaign was a target of foreign influence, but Justice Department reviewers determined only eight of the 19,000 identifiers had sufficient ties to foreign influence activities. The identity of the congressional campaign was not publicly disclosed.

According to 2023 news reports on a declassified ODNI compliance report, in early 2023 FBI personnel had conducted multiple queries on an unnamed congressman using only his last name, which reviewers deemed "overly broad". Representative Darin LaHood (R-Illinois) said in March 2023 that he believed he was a member of Congress improperly queried by the FBI. He stated at a House Intelligence Committee hearing: "It is my opinion that the member of Congress that was wrongfully queried multiple times solely by his name was in fact me."

=== Racial justice protesters ===
Agents queried 133 people arrested during protests following the murder of George Floyd in late May 2020. The FBI initially defended these searches as compliant but later reversed position after a Justice Department review found the queries lacked specific connections to terrorist-related activity.

=== January 6 Capitol attack participants ===
Bureau staff ran more than 20,000 queries on individuals affiliated with groups suspected of involvement in the January 6, 2021 attack on the U.S. Capitol. The Justice Department later determined these searches were not likely to find foreign intelligence information or evidence of a crime. Senior FBI officials attributed the violations to "confusion among the workforce and a lack of common understanding about the querying standards".

=== Query volume and decline ===
Logged FBI searches for Americans' information dropped 94% over a 12-month period ending in November 2022, falling from 3.4 million to approximately 204,000 according to an Office of the Director of National Intelligence transparency report. The decline followed changes adopted in summer 2021 after a FISC judge and the Justice Department inspector general accused the FBI of abusing its Section 702 authority.

The downward trend continued in subsequent years. Logged query numbers fell to approximately 119,000 in 2022, then to 57,000 in 2023. By 2024, logged queries had dropped to approximately 5,500.

An FBI official told reporters that an internal audit of a representative sample of searches showed an increased compliance rate from 82% before the reforms were implemented to 96% afterward.

=== Searches of a U.S. Senator and state officials (2022) ===
A court opinion released July 21, 2023, disclosed that violations involving high-profile targets continued after the FBI implemented reforms. In June 2022, an FBI analyst ran queries using the last names of a sitting U.S. Senator and a state senator "without further limitation". The analyst claimed a foreign intelligence service was targeting those legislators, but the Justice Department's National Security Division determined the searches did not meet FBI standards. The FBI notified the U.S. Senator but not the state senator; the identities of both officials were not publicly disclosed.

A separate violation occurred in October 2022, when an FBI specialist queried the Social Security number of a state judge who had complained to the Bureau about alleged civil rights violations by a municipal police chief. The search lacked adequate justification and did not receive the pre-approval required for politically sensitive queries. The FBI did not notify the judge.

== Foreign Intelligence Surveillance Court findings ==
The Wall Street Journal reported in October 2019 that previously secret court rulings had rebuked the FBI for tens of thousands of improper searches during 2017 and 2018. According to Just Security's analysis of a November 2020 ruling, the court found FBI queries had been used in investigations unrelated to foreign surveillance, including healthcare fraud, organized crime, and public corruption cases.

In May 2023, declassified court documents revealed the 278,000 non-compliant queries from 2020-2021. The court characterized the violations as "persistent and widespread".

A second declassified opinion released in July 2023 revealed additional violations from 2022 involving searches of a U.S. Senator, a state senator, and a state judge.

An October 2018 opinion by U.S. District Judge James Boasberg, who serves on the FISA court, said FBI procedures "not consistent with the Fourth Amendment" when applying a "totality of circumstances" standard balancing privacy intrusion against government interests. The court criticized the "broad and apparently suspicionless nature" of batch queries and noted FBI's "lack of common understanding" of querying standards.

Legal experts and civil liberties advocates argued that searching through Section 702 databases for particular Americans' communications constitutes a "search" under the Fourth Amendment requiring a warrant based on probable cause.

== Response ==
=== FBI ===
FBI Director Christopher Wray defended the FBI's reform efforts while acknowledging past failures. In December 5, 2023 Senate Judiciary Committee testimony, Wray stated: "These violations never should have happened and preventing recurrence is a matter of utmost priority. The FBI took these episodes seriously and responded rigorously, already yielding significant results in dramatically reducing the number of 'U.S. person queries' by the FBI of the Section 702 database and in substantially improving its compliance rate."

Wray emphasized compliance improvements: "The most recent Justice Department report found the reforms working, 99% compliance." However, he opposed warrant requirement proposals, arguing they "would amount to a de facto ban" because applications either would not meet legal standards or would require "expenditure of scarce resources, submission and review of lengthy legal filings, and passage of significant time—which, in the world of rapidly evolving threats, the government often does not have".

=== Reforms ===
Following the December 2019 DOJ Inspector General report, FBI Director Christopher Wray announced corrective actions to FISA policies and procedures. NBC News reported in July 2023 that FBI queries of foreign spy data had fallen 94% following reform implementation.

==== Procedural reforms (2021–2022) ====
Opt-in requirement (Summer 2021): The FBI changed its search systems to require personnel to explicitly opt in to search Section 702 data. Previously, Section 702 information was included by default in all FBI database searches. This change drove much of the query reduction from 2.9 million in 2021 to 119,000 in 2022.

Batch query pre-approval: Beginning in 2021, FBI attorney pre-approval became required for batch queries involving more than 100 query terms. In June 2023, Deputy Director Paul Abbate announced expansion of this requirement to all batch queries regardless of size, since large batch queries had been a source of non-compliant searches.

Sensitive query approval hierarchy: The FBI implemented escalating approval requirements for sensitive searches. FBI Deputy Director approval is now required for queries involving U.S. elected officials, presidential or gubernatorial appointees, political candidates, political organizations, and members of the news media. FBI attorney approval is required for queries involving religious organizations and certain other categories.

Enhanced documentation requirements: FBI systems now require written justifications for all U.S. person queries demonstrating they meet the three-prong standard: authorized purpose, reasonably designed, and specific factual basis that the query is "reasonably likely to retrieve foreign intelligence information or evidence of a crime". Personnel must enter justifications before conducting searches.

==== Training programs ====
In November 2021, the FBI issued FISA Query Guidance to all national security personnel, along with a two-page "FBI FISA Query Guidance Nutshell" desk reference. The FBI developed the guidance jointly with DOJ National Security Division and ODNI. Mandatory training based on this guidance launched in December 2021, with all personnel required to complete it by end of January 2022 to maintain access to FISA systems. Annual recertification training became required starting December 2022, with completion serving as a gating requirement—failure to complete training results in loss of system access.

==== Office of Internal Auditing ====
In August 2020, Attorney General William Barr established the FBI's Office of Internal Auditing (OIA) in direct response to Inspector General Horowitz's findings. The office conducts continuous internal compliance reviews and routine audits of Section 702 queries, FISA minimization procedures, and National Security Letter usage. The OIA's first audit (April 2020–March 2021) established an 82% compliance baseline before reforms. A subsequent audit found 96% compliance post-reforms—a 14 percentage point improvement.

==== Accountability measures ====
In June 2023, the FBI announced a "three-strike policy" for agents who violate query rules, with escalating consequences up to potential dismissal, though the agency retains discretion in determining penalties. The FBI also began including FISA compliance in performance evaluations for field office leadership.

Civil liberties organizations characterized these internal reforms as insufficient, arguing that previous oversight measures "repeatedly touted as robust" had failed to prevent abuses including searches of protesters, political donors, and members of Congress.

=== DOJ Inspector General Michael Horowitz ===
Inspector General Michael Horowitz documented FISA compliance failures through multiple reports and congressional testimony. His December 2019 "Review of Four FISA Applications and Other Aspects of the FBI's Crossfire Hurricane Investigation" identified 17 significant inaccuracies and omissions in FISA applications targeting Carter Page, finding FBI personnel "fell far short" of requirements that applications be "scrupulously accurate".

Horowitz's March 2020 Management Advisory Memorandum and final September 2021 Woods Procedures Audit Report found over 400 instances of non-compliance with factual accuracy requirements in just 29 FISA applications reviewed. The audit also revealed 183 FISA applications (out of over 7,000 authorized between January 2015 and March 2020) were missing required Woods Files documentation either partially or entirely.

A September 2022 Horowitz report on the FBI Office of General Counsel revealed that for several years, DOJ National Security Division and FBI OGC maintained differing interpretations of the Section 702 query standard. This confusion led to numerous compliance incidents and, according to a senior FBI OGC official cited in the report, the FBI "almost losing its Section 702 authorities".

At an April 27, 2023 House Judiciary Subcommittee hearing titled "Fixing FISA: How a Law Designed to Protect Americans Has Been Weaponized Against Them," Horowitz testified on three oversight needs: effective supervisory review in real time, effective routine internal oversight to identify errors close to occurrence, and periodic external independent reviews by the Inspector General and other oversight entities.

In the same congressional testimony, Horowitz also identified "inadequate supervisory review as a significant concern" in both the Crossfire Hurricane investigation and the Woods File audits, leading to reforms affecting both Title I FISA warrants and Section 702 queries.Peter Swire of Georgia Institute of Technology described the Section 702 query violations and the Crossfire Hurricane FISA errors as "two types of problems" with FBI FISA authorities occurring during the same period.

=== Privacy and Civil Liberties Oversight Board ===
The Privacy and Civil Liberties Oversight Board (PCLOB), an independent executive branch agency, released a Section 702 report on September 28, 2023. Lawfare and Stars and Stripes reported that the board split on key recommendations, with the report concluding Section 702 "remains highly valuable to protect national security" but creates "serious privacy and civil liberties risks".

The PCLOB found that FBI conducted over 200,000 U.S. person queries in 2022—more than the CIA, NSA, and NCTC combined, which collectively conducted only several thousand queries. The board could not obtain government estimates of how many Americans' communications were incidentally collected under Section 702.

The PCLOB issued 19 recommendations (adopted by 3–2 vote), with the most significant calling for FISC authorization of U.S. person query terms before searches could be conducted, with exceptions only for consent and exigent circumstances. Other recommendations included codifying prohibition on "abouts" collection, ensuring each batch query term individually meets standards, and requiring DOJ to annually review each FBI field office's compliance.

Chair Franklin issued a separate statement recommending a probable cause standard for FBI queries seeking evidence of crime, arguing "search through Section 702 communications data seeking information about a particular American constitutes a search under the Fourth Amendment" requiring traditional warrant protections. Two board members—Beth Williams and Richard DiZinno—dissented, calling the policy analysis "deeply flawed" and arguing the report "undervalues key aspects of the program, especially U.S. person queries".

=== Congressional oversight ===
Senate Judiciary Committee Chair Dick Durbin (D-Illinois) and Senator Mike Lee (R-Utah) led efforts to impose warrant requirements through the Security and Freedom Enhancement (SAFE) Act. Durbin stated, "I will only support the reauthorization of Section 702 if there are significant reforms", focusing on addressing "warrantless surveillance of Americans in violation of the Fourth Amendment".

House Judiciary Committee Chairman Jim Jordan (R-Ohio) criticized the FBI, repeatedly citing the "204,000 improper searches" figure in hearings and public statements. Jordan questioned whether the FBI should query databases on American citizens at all. His committee advanced legislation including warrant requirements, while the House Intelligence Committee under Chairman Mike Turner (R-Ohio) produced competing bills with more modest reforms favored by the intelligence community.

The Senate Intelligence Committee, chaired by Mark Warner (D-Virginia), advanced the FISA Reform and Reauthorization Act with more limited reforms. Senate Intelligence Committee Vice Chair Marco Rubio (R-Florida) co-sponsored this approach. Senate critics including Ron Wyden (D-Oregon), Rand Paul (R-Kentucky), and Ted Cruz (R-Texas) who pushed for more substantial privacy protections.

Following the April 2023 transparency report showing the 94% decline in searches, Turner and LaHood issued a joint statement calling for "substantive and meaningful reforms to help deter abusive behavior by the FBI in the FISA process" and said "without additional safeguards, a clean reauthorization of 702 is a non-starter". Representative Jim Himes (D-Connecticut), ranking member on the House Intelligence Committee, said the decline "provides strong evidence that the reforms already put in place, particularly at FBI, are having the intended effects".

=== Civil liberties and constitutional concerns ===
Civil liberties organizations opposed Section 702 reauthorization without warrant requirements. The American Civil Liberties Union, through attorneys Patrick Toomey and Kia Hamadanchy, argued Section 702 "is routinely used against Americans, immigrants, and people who are not accused of any wrongdoing" and that the FBI "continues to break the rules" despite reform promises.

The Brennan Center for Justice, through analysts including Elizabeth Goitein and Faiza Patel, published documentation arguing Section 702 had "morphed into a domestic surveillance tool" that violated Fourth Amendment prohibitions on warrantless searches. A 31-organization coalition including the Brennan Center, ACLU, Electronic Frontier Foundation, Center for Democracy and Technology, and Electronic Privacy Information Center opposed reauthorization without structural reforms.

EFF analysts documented the FBI's pattern of making reform promises followed by continued violations: the FBI pledged compliance improvements after revelations in 2013, 2016, 2017, and 2018, yet violations persisted. Analysts for The Center for Democracy and Technology concluded this pattern indicated "procedural reforms will not break pattern of misuse in the future", requiring statutory warrant requirements with judicial oversight rather than internal FBI policy changes.

Constitutional concerns centered on several issues: the volume of warrantless searches (up to 3.4 million in 2021), use of surveillance for domestic crimes unrelated to national security (healthcare fraud, bribery, public corruption), political surveillance risks (congressional donors, protesters, journalists, elected officials), and lack of individualized suspicion before accessing Americans' communications. Critics argued these practices violated core Fourth Amendment principles requiring warrants based on probable cause before government searches of citizens' private communications.

Civil liberties advocates drew comparisons to earlier FBI surveillance abuses. The Center for Democracy and Technology stated in May 2023 that "the systemic misuse of this warrantless surveillance tool has made FISA 702 as toxic as COINTELPRO and the FBI abuses of the Hoover years". The Church Committee's 1975 investigation of COINTELPRO abuses had led directly to FISA's creation in 1978.

== Aftermath ==
=== Impact on Section 702 reauthorization ===
Section 702 was set to expire on December 31, 2023. As it had become a Section 702 has become a cause celebre among hardline conservatives, its renewal faces opposition. A YouGov poll found that 75% of Americans supported warrant requirements, while a poll from Morning Consult found that 55% of Americans supported renewal of Section 702. Opponents argued warrant applications would either fail to meet legal standards or take too long to process during time-sensitive national security threats, effectively creating a "de facto ban" on a vital intelligence tool.

In December 2023, Congress inserted a four-month extension - until April 19, 2024 - into the National Defense Authorization Act after Speaker Mike Johnson pulled competing bills from the floor when the House Rules Committee refused to allow simultaneous votes.

Nineteen conservative rebels, including Matt Gaetz, blocked re-authorisation legislation, relenting in April when Johnson agreed to go to a vote on a two-year rather than five-year extension, so the next debate would occur within the Trump administration. On April 12, 2024, the House voted on an amendment from one of the rebels, Republican Andy Biggs, and progressive Democrat Pramila Jayapal, to require warrants for backdoor searches; the vote tied 212–212. The tie meant the amendment failed. The breakdown showed 128 Republicans and 84 Democrats voting yes, while 86 Republicans and 126 Democrats voted no, reflecting cross-party divisions. Speaker Johnson voted against the amendment, drawing criticism from conservative allies who noted he had previously supported warrant requirements before becoming speaker.

The Biden administration lobbied against the warrant requirement, with Attorney General Merrick Garland making personal calls to members on the morning of the vote. Administration officials circulated memos calling the amendment a "threat to national security" and "reckless policy choice". Intelligence officials briefed members in classified settings near the House floor, citing specific cases including a Chinese fentanyl precursor shipment identified through a 702 query just 48 hours before arrival.

Warrant requirement supporters, including Representatives Andy Biggs (R-Arizona), Pramila Jayapal (D-Washington), Jim Jordan (R-Ohio), and Jerry Nadler (D-New York), argued the FBI's 278,000 violations demonstrated internal reforms were insufficient and judicial oversight was essential to protect Fourth Amendment rights. Civil liberties group, Electronic Frontier Foundation, campaigning against renewal, said the 212–212 vote was evidence that warrant requirements could succeed in future legislation.

The Reforming Intelligence and Securing America Act (RISAA, H.R. 7888), which reauthorized Section 702 warrant requirements, passed the House 273–147 on April 12, 2024. The bill contained a two-year extension, shortened from five years to accommodate conservative concerns . The final bill required FBI supervisor or attorney approval for all U.S. person queries and barred political appointees from the approval process. Enhanced approval requirements applied to sensitive queries involving elected officials, media, and religious organizations. The legislation prohibited queries "solely designed to find evidence of criminal activity" (with narrow exceptions), codified annual training requirements, and mandated that the FBI Director report annually to Congress on accountability actions. The DOJ Inspector General must assess FBI compliance and reform effectiveness by October 2025. RISAA also expanded the definition of "electronic communication service provider" potentially requiring hotels, libraries, and coffee shops with WiFi to assist surveillance—a provision Senator Ron Wyden called "the most dramatic and terrifying expansion of government surveillance authority in history".

The Senate approved RISAA 60–34, voted in the early morning hours of April 20, 2024, with final passage at approximately 12:40 AM, just 40 minutes after the midnight statutory deadline. The Senate voted on six reform amendments, all of which failed. This included the Durbin-Cramer warrant requirement amendment (42–50, needing 60 votes) and the Wyden amendment to strike the expanded ECSP definition (34–58). Supporters included Intelligence Committee leaders Mark Warner (D-VA) and Marco Rubio (R-FL), while opponents included Dick Durbin (D-IL), Ron Wyden (D-OR), Rand Paul (R-KY), Mike Lee (R-UT), and Ted Cruz (R-TX).

President Biden signed the bill into law on April 20, 2024, reauthorizing Section 702 through April 20, 2026.

=== Continuing controversies ===
In January 2025, a federal district court ruled that backdoor searches of Section 702 databases ordinarily require warrants, calling the practice a violation of Fourth Amendment protections.

== See also ==
- Snowden disclosures
- FISA Amendments Act of 2008
- Arctic Frost investigation
- Stellar Wind
