= Susan Glasser =

American journalist (born 1969)

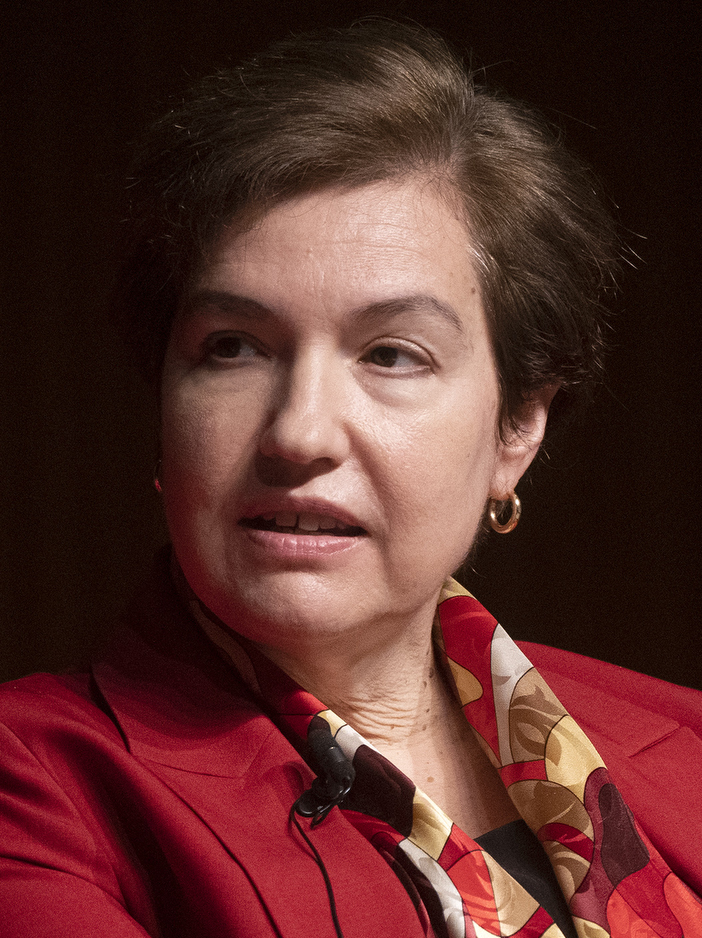
- Glasser in 2022
- Born: January 14, 1969 (age 57); Montclair, New Jersey, U.S.
- Education: Harvard University (BA)
- Occupation: Journalist
- Spouse: Peter Baker (m. 2000)
- Children: Theo Baker

Susan B. Glasser (born January 14, 1969) is an American journalist. She writes the online column "Letter from Trump's Washington" in The New Yorker, where she is a staff writer.

She is the author, with her husband Peter Baker, of Kremlin Rising: Vladimir Putin's Russia and the End of Revolution (2005), The Man Who Ran Washington: The Life and Times of James A. Baker III (2020), and The Divider: Trump in the White House, 2017-2021 (2022).

== Early life and education ==
Glasser is the daughter of Lynn (née Schreiber) and Stephen Glasser. She is of Jewish descent. Her parents are the founders of a weekly legal newspaper, Legal Times, and a legal and business publishing company, Glasser Legal Works. Her grandfather, Melvin Glasser, supervised the field trials for the polio vaccine.

She was raised in Montclair, New Jersey, and attended Montclair High School, before transferring to Phillips Academy after her sophomore year. Glasser graduated cum laude from Harvard University, where she served as the managing editor of The Harvard Crimson.

== Career ==
Glasser interned, and later worked for eight years, at Roll Call. In 1998, Glasser started at The Washington Post, where she spent a decade. She edited the Post's Sunday Outlook and national news sections, helped oversee coverage of Bill Clinton's impeachment, covered the wars in Iraq and in Afghanistan, and served as Moscow bureau co-chief with her husband, Peter Baker.

She was editor-in-chief of Foreign Policy until 2013. Glasser then joined Politico and served as editor during the 2016 election cycle. She also was the founding editor of Politico Magazine, a long-form publication both online and in print.

== Works ==
- Baker, Peter; Glasser, Susan (2005). Kremlin Rising: Vladimir Putin's Russia and the End of Revolution. Simon & Schuster. ISBN 978-0-7432-8179-9.
- Baker, Peter; Glasser, Susan (2020). The Man Who Ran Washington. Doubleday. ISBN 978-0-385-54055-1.
- Baker, Peter; Glasser, Susan (September 20, 2022). The Divider: Trump in the White House, 2017-2021. Knopf Doubleday Publishing Group. ISBN 978-0-385-54654-6.

== Personal life ==
In September 2000, Glasser married Peter Baker in a civil ceremony. Her husband is the chief White House correspondent for The New York Times. Baker and Glasser live in Washington.

Their son, Theo Baker, became the youngest person to win a Polk Award in 2023 for reporting that led to the resignation of Marc Tessier-Lavigne, the then president of Stanford University, who had published research articles that contained manipulated images.
