= Temporary Commission on Employee Loyalty =

United States presidential commission

Temporary Commission on Employee Loyalty (TECL)
- Successor: Executive Order 9835
- Formation: January 25, 1946; 80 years ago
- Dissolved: February 1, 1947; 79 years ago
- Purpose: Examine Executive branch methods of security checks on federal employees
- Location: Washington, DC
- Fields: Security, internal governmental investigation
- Official language: English
- Chairman (Department of Justice): A. Devitt Vanech
- Board of directors: Department of State, Treasury, Department of War, Civil Service Commission
- Parent organization: President of the United States

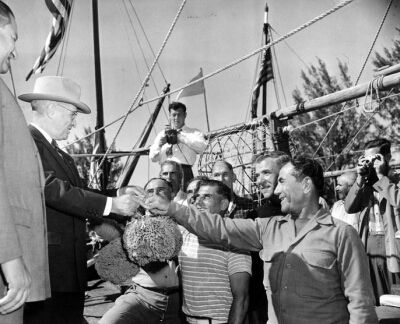
Harry S. Truman with Greek American sponge divers, Florida (1947), a short time after the life of the TCEL

On November 25, 1946, U.S. President Harry S. Truman announced the creation of the President's Temporary Commission on Employee Loyalty (TCEL) (November 25, 1946 – February 1, 1947).

== Background ==
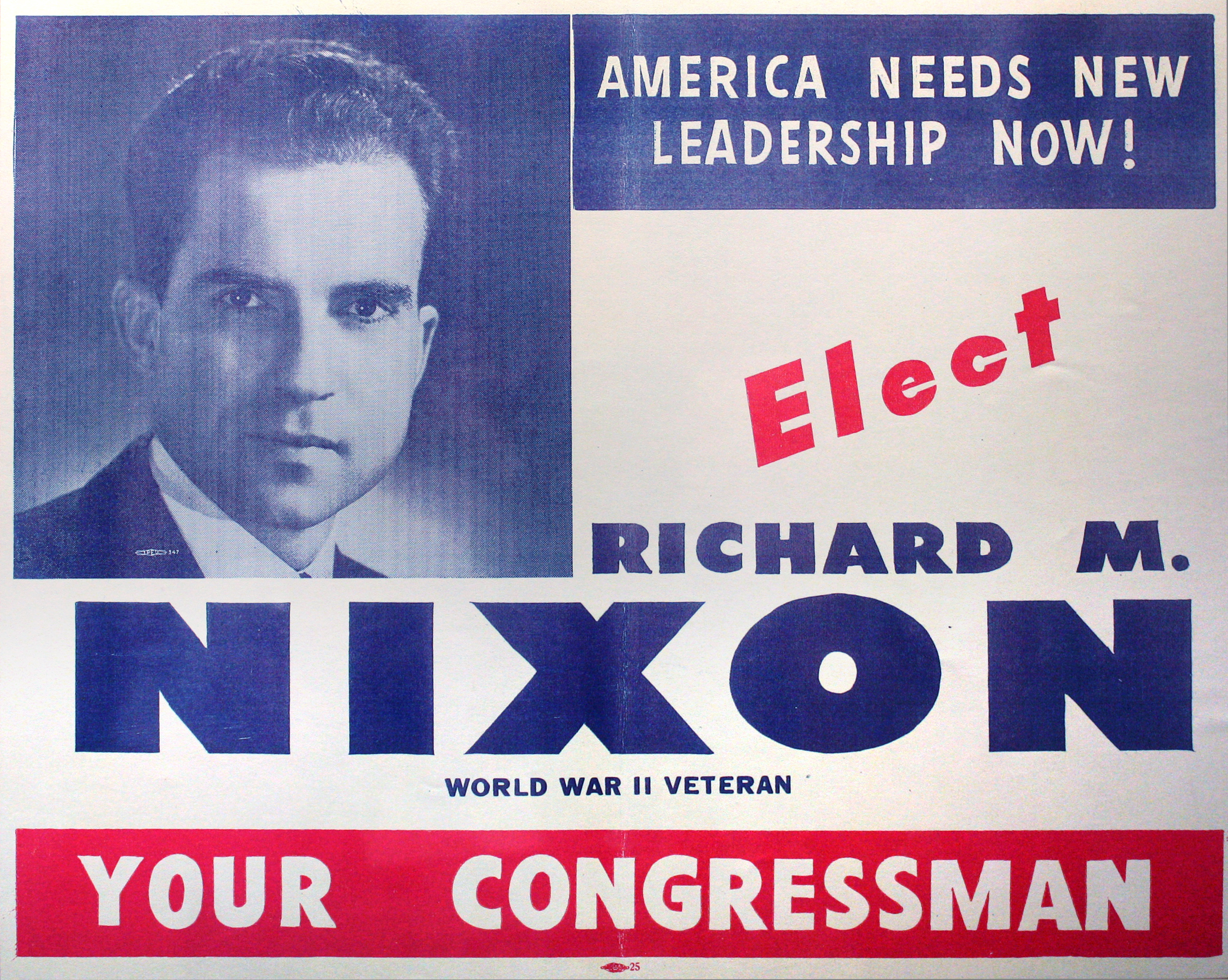
Richard Nixon congressional campaign flyer (1946)

The formation of the TCEL came two weeks after a sweeping Republican victory in 1946 mid-term elections (in which Richard Nixon first gained federal office and Joseph McCarthy rose from Wisconsin judge to U.S. Senator).

The House civil service subcommittee had recommended a similar investigative body during the summer of 1946, which the President directed the new commission to consider. The interagency commission would "study the Governments methods for testing the loyalty of its more than 2,000,000 employes [sic]."

== Formation ==
News of the TCEL made the front page of the New York Times under the headline "President orders purge of disloyal from U.S. posts."

== Structure ==
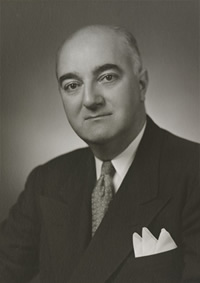
A. Devitt Vanech, appointed by Tom C. Clark as TCEL chair

Truman's commission consisted of representatives from several government departments: Department of Justice, Department of State, Treasury, Department of War, and Civil Service Commission.

U.S. Attorney General Tom C. Clark appointed Special Assistant to the Attorney General A. Devitt Vanech as chair. (Vanech was close to FBI Director J. Edgar Hoover at the time.)

Commissioners were to serve without pay and submit their first report to the President by February 1, 1947.

== Mission ==
The commission sought to determine federal loyalty standards and establish procedures for removal or disqualification of disloyal or subversive persons from federal posts.

While President Truman empowered the commission to follow its own course, he asked that it pursue the following issues:

1. Whether existing security procedures in the Executive Branch of the Government furnish adequate protection against the employment or continuance of employment of disloyal or subversive persons, and what agency or agencies should be charged with prescribing and supervising security procedures.
2. Whether responsibility for acting upon investigative reports dealing with disloyal or subversive persons should be left to the agencies employing them or whether a single agency should handle it.
3. What procedure should be established for notifying allegedly disloyal or subversive employes or applicants for employment of the charges made against them, and what procedures should be established to guarantee a fair hearing on such charges.
4. What standards are desirable for judging the loyalty of employes of the Government and applicants for such employment.
5. Whether further legislation is necessary for the adequate protection of the Government against the employment or continuance in employment of disloyal or subversive persons.

The President's aim was believed:

Motivated in part by a desire to strip the opposition of the "Red" cry which it has directed at the Administration, The chief target, most observers, agreed, would be the Communists. But the question in many minds last week was: Where would a distinguishing line between Communists and non-Communist leftists be drawn?

== Naming ==
The TCEL did not receive its name until a few days later, apparently appearing in print on December 1, 1946, in the New York Times and Washington Post.

== Report and cessation ==
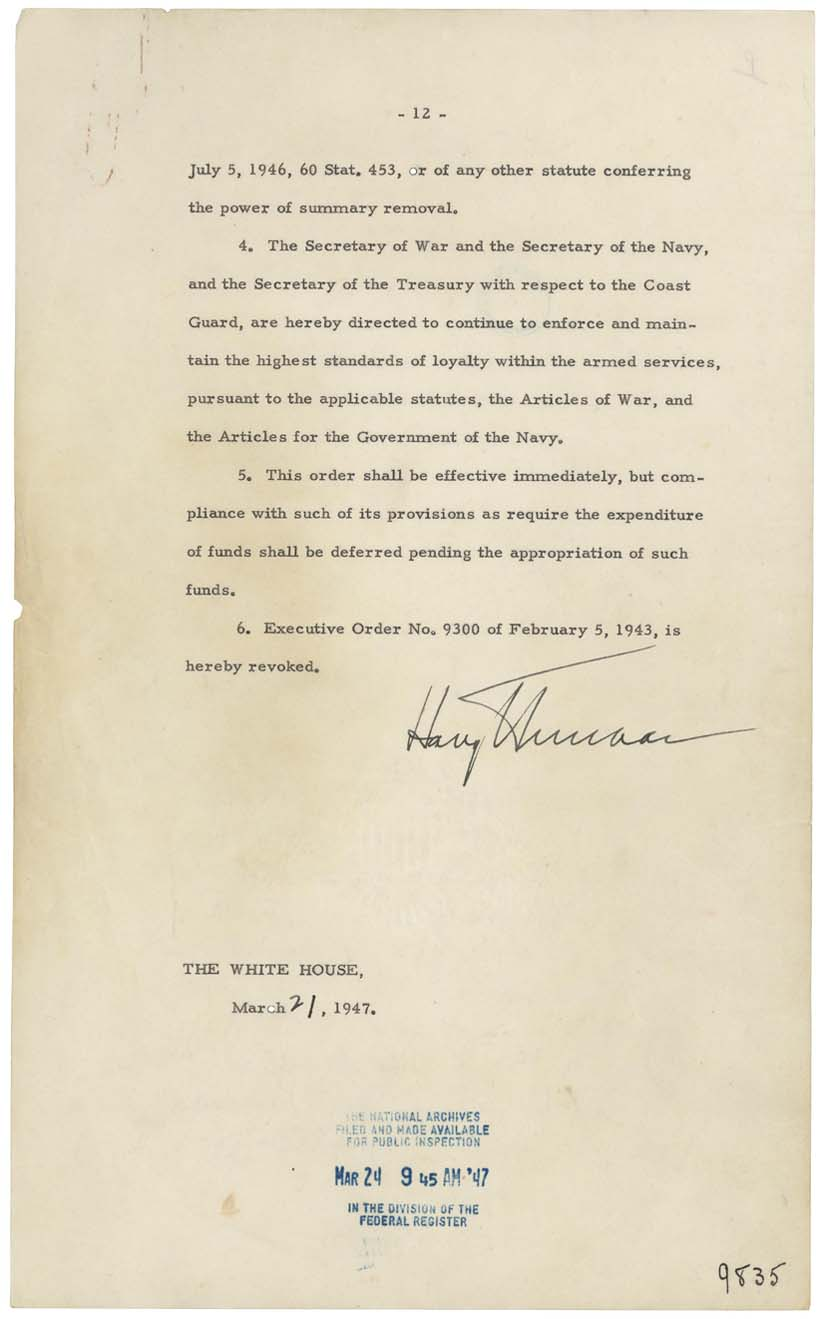
Executive Order 9835 signature page

With submission of the TCEL's report on February 1, 1947, the commission would cease.

The report of the TCEL led directly to Truman's Executive Order 9835.

== See also ==
- Executive Order 9835
- Loyalty oath
