= James Linton (hacker) =

Email prankster

- Other name: SINON_REBORN
- Occupation: Email threat researcher
- Known for: Email pranks

James Linton is a social engineer and email prankster known for duping high-profile celebrities and politicians. For five months in 2016 through to 2017, the "lazy anarchist" known by the Twitter alias SINON_REBORN created over 150 look-alike email accounts and emailed high-profile individuals in the political, financial, and entertainment industries from his iPhone 7.

== Background ==
Linton is a former designer and front end web developer. He was suspended from his job when his bosses suspected he was emailing victims at work. He lives in Manchester with his partner and three cats.

His moniker SINON_REBORN comes from Sinon, the name of the Greek Soldier who persuades the Trojans to accept the Trojan Horse, basis of the eponymous computing trick he utilised.

He revealed his identity to the media in September 2017 and later became a threat researcher and speaker for email security firm Agari.

== Prank spree ==
In May 2017, Linton began his spree with Jes Staley, CEO of Barclays as chairman John McFarlane, who he pranked with an acrostic alluding to whistleblower investigation. Days later, he sent sexist remarks to Mark Carney, Governor of the Bank of England and an invitation to a fake soiree. This led to a tightening of Barclay's email security procedures.

In June, impersonating Jeremy Corbyn's press secretary, British politician Diane Abbott was tricked into commenting about her health.

Shortly after, he tricked Lloyd Blankfein, CEO of Goldman Sachs into making a dig at president Trump, Citigroup banking chiefs Michael Corbat and Stephen Bird with links to his previous pranks then corresponded with James Gorman, CEO of Morgan Stanley.

In late June, right-wing media personality Katie Hopkins, was tricked into joining a fictional TV show "Adders Basket" debating feminists, liberals and vegans.

In August, he targeted the White House. Posing as Jared Kushner he tricked a senior cyber security advisor into his authenticity, taunted then media chief Anthony Scaramucci as ex chief of staff Reince Priebus just before he was fired, invited US Homeland Security Advisor Tom Bossert to a soiree, and joked with Eric Trump about his dad's similarities to Putin. Personal lawyer to Donald Trump Michael Cohen was persuaded to tweet a photograph with a hidden gif and Jared Kushner's lawyer Abbe Lowell incorrectly forwarded a request from the senate intelligence committee asking about Kushner's undisclosed private email account to a fake account. Lawyer Ty Cobb and press secretary Sarah Sanders corresponded, joking about droning journalist Natasha Bertrand.

In early August, former UK Home Secretary Amber Rudd briefly corresponded from her personal address about upcoming announcements to a fake advisor account.

Later in August, Breitbart editors Alex Marlow and Joel Pollak commented they would do Steve Bannon's 'dirty work' to fake a Steve Bannon account, ousting Jared Kushner and Ivanka Trump and shared a personal smear about their private lives.

In September, former United States Deputy Attorney General Jamie Gorelick briefly fell for fake emails from her client Jared Kushner but didn't reveal anything confidential.

In October, Linton posing as now disgraced Hollywood Producer Harvey Weinstein, confessing regrets for his actions to his former lawyers Lanny Davis and Lisa Bloom.

Later in October, he targeted Shark Tank personality Robert Herjavec as the company CEO, inviting him to a toga party. Later the fake account was copied into official financial projection documents.

In late October, UK National Cyber Security Centre technical director Dr Ian Levy was targeted with a fake industry event, however Levy correctly identified the unexpected link to mail.com. Linton was then asked by Levy to co-write a blog about the experience.

Linton's last prank was targeting conservative media pundit Ann Coulter, posing as Sheriff David Clarke persuading her to review an article about immigration.

== Other pranks ==
- Kevin Spacey, American actor, producer, and singer
- Alan Stewart, CFO Tesco as John Allan, CEO Tesco
- Dennis Muilenburg, CEO, Boeing as Ed Liddy, Board Member of Boeing
- Norman Tebbit, UK Politician as Boris Johnson, then Secretary of State for Foreign Affairs. Fake Johnson told Tebbit to "go fuck yourself".
- Jessica Shears, UK Love Island reality TV star
- James Woods Hollywood actor and producer
- Ezra Levant, CEO of Rebel Media
- Tucker Carlson and Brian Kilmeade of Fox News
