= David W. Ogden =

American lawyer (born 1953)

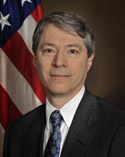

34th United States Deputy Attorney General
- In office March 12, 2009 – February 5, 2010
- President: Barack Obama
- Attorney General: Eric Holder
- Preceded by: Mark Filip
- Succeeded by: Gary Grindler (Acting)

United States Assistant Attorney General for the Civil Division
- In office 1999 – 2001; Acting: 1999–2000
- President: Bill Clinton
- Attorney General: Janet Reno
- Preceded by: Frank W. Hunger
- Succeeded by: Robert McCallum Jr.

Chief of Staff to the United States Attorney General
- In office 1998–1999
- President: Bill Clinton
- Preceded by: John Hogan
- Succeeded by: Ann Harkins

Personal details
- Born: David William Ogden; November 12, 1953 (age 73) Washington, D.C., U.S.
- Spouse: Anne Harkavy
- Children: 3
- Education: University of Pennsylvania (BA); Harvard University (JD)

David William Ogden (born November 12, 1953) is an American lawyer who served as the United States deputy attorney general. Ogden was also a high-ranking official in the United States Department of Justice and the United States Department of Defense during the administration of President Bill Clinton.

== Early life and education ==
Ogden is the son of Horace G. "Hod" Ogden (1925–1998), who was the first director of the Bureau of Health Education at the Centers for Disease Control and Prevention (and previously had worked for the United States Department of Health, Education, and Welfare), and Elaine C. Ogden, an elementary school teacher.

Ogden earned an A.B. summa cum laude from the University of Pennsylvania in 1976 and a J.D. magna cum laude in 1981 from Harvard Law School. He served as an editor of the Harvard Law Review. In 1981–82, Ogden clerked for Judge Abraham David Sofaer of the U.S. District Court for the Southern District of New York, and in 1982–83, he clerked for U.S. Supreme Court Associate Justice Harry A. Blackmun.

== Career ==
Ogden began his career in Washington, D.C., as an associate from 1983 until 1985 at the law firm of Ennis Friedman & Bersoff, and he served as a partner at that firm from 1986 until 1988. From 1988 until 1994, Ogden was a partner in the Washington, D.C., office of Jenner & Block. From 1994 to 1995, he served as the deputy general counsel and legal counsel for the United States Department of Defense. From 1995 to 1997, he was an associate deputy attorney general in the United States Department of Justice. From 1997 to 1998, Ogden was counselor to United States Attorney General Janet Reno, and from 1998–99, he was chief of staff to Attorney General Reno. From 1999–2000, he was acting assistant attorney general and from 2000 to 2001, the Senate-confirmed assistant attorney general in charge of the Civil Division in the United States Department of Justice. As assistant attorney general, Ogden led the Justice Department's largest litigation division handling major constitutional, administrative law, false claims act, government contracts, consumer law, and tort matters. In September 1999, under his leadership, the Civil Division filed the United States' high profile lawsuit against the tobacco industry.

From June 2001 until November 2008, and again since April 2010, Ogden has been a partner in the Washington, D.C., office of the law firm Wilmer Cutler Pickering Hale and Dorr ("WilmerHale"), leading the firm's Government and Regulatory Litigation Practice Group. In private practice, he has represented a wide range of businesses, trade associations, and individuals in litigation, arbitration and investigations against the United States government, state governments and foreign governments, and private parties, including cases under the Administrative Procedure Act, fair lending laws, the False Claims Act, fraud racketeering laws, international litigation, and arbitration.

== Deputy attorney general ==
On January 5, 2009, President-elect Barack Obama announced he would nominate Ogden to be deputy attorney general. Ogden's nomination was criticized by conservative groups that objected to some of his previous legal work, such as litigation under the First Amendment on behalf of adult entertainment companies including Playboy and Penthouse and amicus briefs on behalf of the American Psychological Association in constitutional litigation involving abortion and gay rights. However, the selection was praised and supported by the Leadership Conference on Civil Rights, the Federal Law Enforcement Officers Association, the National Sheriffs' Association, the National District Attorneys Association, Larry Thompson, Jamie S. Gorelick, Seth Waxman, the Boys and Girls Clubs of America, and the National Center for Missing and Exploited Children. Ogden was confirmed by the United States Senate on March 12, 2009, in a vote of 65–28.

As deputy attorney general, Ogden set new Justice Department policy in connection with criminal and civil discovery to fulfill the department's obligations to disclose exculpatory information to criminal defendants; providing new law enforcement resources to help Native American tribal communities combat violence against women and children; redoubling federal efforts to combat health care fraud; and accommodating federal enforcement policy to laws in several states legalizing medicinal use of marijuana.

On December 3, 2009, it was announced that he would be resigning his post and returning to private practice in February 2010. According to news accounts, Ogden stepped down in part because of disagreements with Attorney General Eric Holder over management issues.

== Personal life ==
Ogden is married to Anne Harkavy and has three children; two by his first marriage. Harkavy was formerly deputy general counsel for litigation, regulation and enforcement for the U.S. Department of Energy.

== See also ==
- List of law clerks for the second seat of the Supreme Court of the United States

Legal offices
Preceded by Mark Filip	United States Deputy Attorney General; 2009–2010	Succeeded by Gary Grindler; Acting
