= Executive Order 9835 =

1947 Loyalty Order by President Truman

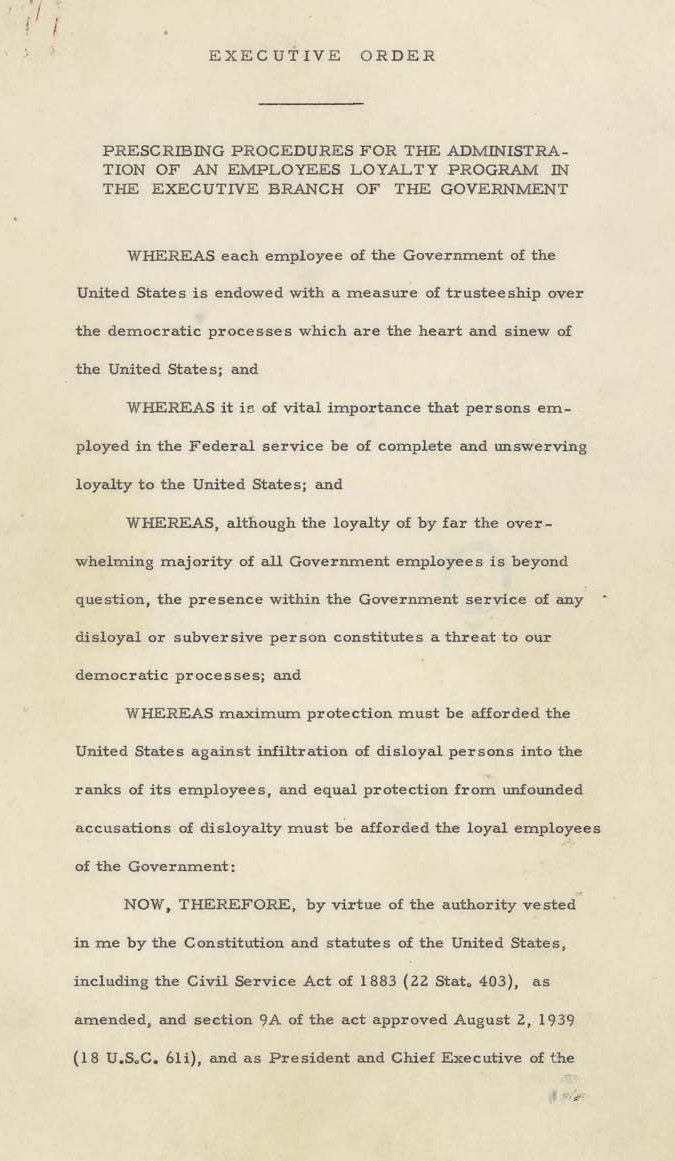
Page one of Executive Order 9835, signed by Harry S. Truman in 1947

President Harry S. Truman signed United States Executive Order 9835, sometimes known as the "Loyalty Order", on March 21, 1947. The order established the first general loyalty program in the United States, designed to root out communist influence in the U.S. federal government. Truman aimed to rally public opinion behind his Cold War policies with investigations conducted under its authority. He also hoped to quiet right-wing critics who accused Democrats of being soft on communism. At the same time, he advised the Loyalty Review Board to limit the role of the Federal Bureau of Investigation (FBI) to avoid a witch hunt. The program investigated over 3 million government employees, just over 300 of whom were dismissed as security risks.

The Loyalty Order was part of the prelude to the rise of Senator Joseph McCarthy, Republican of Wisconsin. It was mostly the result of increasing U.S.–Soviet tensions and political maneuvering by the president and Congress. The order established a wide area for the departmental loyalty boards to conduct loyalty screenings of federal employees and job applicants. It allowed the FBI to run initial name checks on federal employees and authorized further field investigations if the initial inquiry uncovered information that cast someone in a negative light. Executive Order 9835 also was the main impetus for the creation of the Attorney General's List of Subversive Organizations (AGLOSO).

== Background and Truman's motivations ==
As U.S. relations with the Soviet Union rapidly deteriorated following World War II, there were accompanying concerns about government infiltration by communists. As the U.S. and USSR shifted from being wartime allies to staunch adversaries, American obsession with perceived dangers associated with the Soviet Union, and communists in general, began to grow. Much of this obsession was fueled by reports, in and out of the government, of Soviet spying in the United States. Economic tension helped foster a general state of anger and anxiety in the U.S. and its government. As congressional elections approached in late 1946, many American conservative groups attempted to ignite a new Red Scare. The Republican Party, assisted by a coalition that included the Catholic Church, the FBI and private entrepreneurs, worked to inflame public fear and suspicion. As fear of Communist infiltration in the government grew, it became a central campaign issue in the 1946 elections.

Fresh investigations by the House Un-American Activities Committee (HUAC) ensured that the issue would stay on the minds of constituents, and Republicans found a niche they could use for an electoral advantage. HUAC, amid the anxieties of the elections and international tensions, had investigated several alleged communist front organizations. These investigations led to fresh questions about employee loyalty from the House committee. Republicans, looking for sizable Congressional gains, took full advantage of this atmosphere and made the issue a central theme of the 1946 campaign. Communist infiltration, along with attacks on the Truman administration's economic policies, were manifested in campaign slogans such as "Had Enough?" and "Communism vs. Republicanism." Meanwhile, under the leadership of Republican National Chairman Carroll Reece, the Republican Party made repeated anti-communist attacks on Truman and Congressional Democrats. Reece often referred to the "pink puppets in control of the federal bureaucracy." House Republican leader Joe Martin pledged to clean out communists from high positions in the U.S. government. The election of 1946 produced a huge Republican victory in which they gained control of both houses of Congress for the first time since 1932.

Two weeks after the sweeping Republican victory, the president announced the creation of the President's Temporary Commission on Employee Loyalty (TCEL) on November 25, 1946. News of the TCEL made the front page of The New York Times under the headline "President orders purge of disloyal from U.S. posts." Truman's commission consisted of representatives from six government departments under the chairmanship of Special Assistant to the Attorney General A. Devitt Vanech, who was close to FBI Director J. Edgar Hoover at the time. The commission sought to determine federal loyalty standards and establish procedures for removal or disqualification of disloyal or subversive persons from federal posts.

Contemporary observers as well as historians have characterized Truman's actions surrounding TCEL and the 1947 executive order as purely politically motivated. The timing of his actions so soon after the Democratic electoral defeat, and his request that TCEL submit its report by February 1, 1947, have been interpreted as a move to preempt further action on the loyalty issue from the new Republican-controlled Congress. On February 28, 1947, about a month before he signed EO 9835, Truman wrote to Pennsylvania Governor George Earle, "People are very much wrought up about the Communist 'bugaboo' but I am of the opinion that the country is perfectly safe so far as Communism is concerned–we have too many sane people." White House Counsel Clark Clifford wrote in his 1991 memoir that his "greatest regret" from his decades in government was his failure to "make more of an effort to kill the loyalty program at its inception, in 1946-47." He added that the 1946 elections had "weakened" Truman but "emboldened Hoover and his allies" and that the creation of the TCEL was the result of pressure from FBI Director Hoover and Attorney General Tom Clark, who "constantly urged the President to expand the investigative authority of the FBI."

== Provisions ==
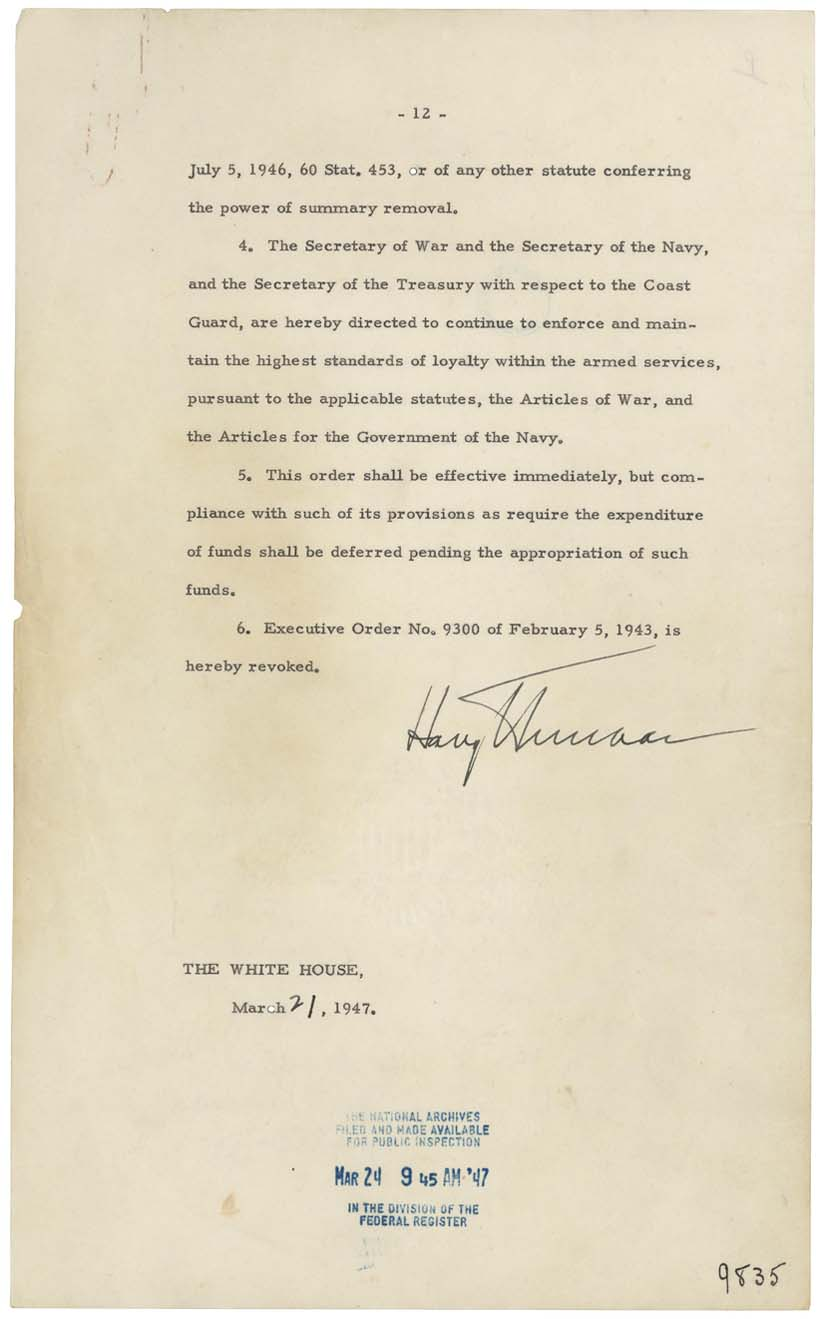
The signature page of Executive Order 9835

The Federal Employee Loyalty Program allowed the FBI to research whether the name of any of 2 million federal employees raised questions about their associations and beliefs and, if "derogatory information" was found, to follow up with a field investigation. The results of field investigations were delivered to 150 loyalty boards in various government departments. Those boards conducted their own investigations and were authorized to use the testimony of confidential witnesses whom the subject of the investigation was unable to confront. An employee could be fired if "reasonable doubt" existed concerning their loyalty. A loyalty board's decision was not subject to appeal.

The text of the EO provided specific powers pertaining to employee loyalty. First and foremost among these was that "there shall be a loyalty investigation of every person entering civilian employment" in any facet of the executive branch of the U.S. government. Much of the rest of EO 9835's content simply reinforced policy surrounding the first statements on loyalty investigations, as well as seeking to establish a manner in which to go about with the loyalty investigations. As such, Part II of the EO provided the power to the head of each department or agency to appoint one or more loyalty boards. The boards' express purpose was to hear loyalty cases. In addition, Part V of the EO outlined criteria and standards for the refusal of (or removal from) employment for disloyalty. Disloyalty for these purposes was defined in five categories. These included:

- sabotage, espionage, spying or the advocacy thereof
- treason, sedition or the advocacy thereof
- intentional, unauthorized disclosure of confidential information
- advocacy of the violent overthrow of the U.S. government
- membership in, affiliation with or sympathetic association with any organization labeled as totalitarian, fascist, communist or subversive

== Subversive organizations ==
EO 9835 facilitated the establishment of the highly publicized "Attorney General's List of Subversive Organizations" (AGLOSO). Eventually, AGLOSO would become one of the central influences in the second American Red Scare, known collectively as McCarthyism. The list came into being after Truman signed EO 9835, both the order and AGLOSO established more than two years before Senator Joseph McCarthy's first allegations of communist infiltration in the U.S. government in early 1950.

The stated purpose of the list was to lend guidance for federal civil service loyalty determinations. However, AGLOSO essentially became the litmus test for loyalty and disloyalty in a variety of public and private departments and organizations. The Attorney General's list was adopted by state and local governments, the military, defense contractors, hotels, the Treasury Department (tax-exemption determinations) and the State Department (passport and deportation determinations). The list was massively publicized in the federal government's effort against communist infiltration. Despite the widespread publicity, the Justice Department and other agencies refused to release more than small amounts of information on other aspects of the list besides its contents. Included among the secret information were particulars such as how the list was compiled, criteria for listing, why the list was published, and why no notification was given to any of the listed organizations about their designation prior to the list's publication. Little was made at the time of the revelation that AGLOSO was nothing new; in fact, the government had been keeping a secret list to aid in screening for federal employee loyalty since 1940.

The first official list was published shortly after the March 21 executive order. According to FBI documents, obtained under the Freedom of Information Act nearly 60 years later, AGLOSO was born on or about April 3, 1947 when the bureau responded to a March 27 request from the Attorney General for a list of "organizations thought to be subversive." The FBI's response included 41 groups "thought to be most dangerous within the purview of the recent Executive Order (9835)." A March 29 FBI document indicated that among the groups on the list were the Ku Klux Klan, the Communist Party, the Nazi Party and 38 alleged "front groups."

== Outcome of the order ==
Between 1948 and 1958, the FBI ran initial reviews of 4.5 million government employees and, on an annual basis, another 500,000 applicants for government positions. It conducted 27,000 field investigations. Besides those officially terminated as a result of investigations, around 5,000 federal employees offered voluntary resignations in light of the investigations. Most of the resignations took places at hearings conducted by Congressional committees. According to one historian, "By mid-1952, when more than 4 million people, actual or prospective employees, had gone through the check, boards had…dismissed or denied employment to 378…None of the discharged cases led to discovery of espionage."

The executive order said: "maximum protection must be afforded the United States against infiltration of disloyal persons into the ranks of its employees, and equal protection from unfounded accusations of disloyalty must be afforded the loyal employees." But those protections were deemed inadequate, as objections surfaced regarding the lack of due process protections resulting from the departmental loyalty board procedures. One complaint concerned the lack of opportunity to confront those anonymous informants that EO 9835 protected from being named to the accused.

In 1950, the D.C. Circuit Court affirmed the procedures of EO 9835 in Bailey v. Richardson, and a tie in the U.S. Supreme Court allowed that ruling to stand. In 1955, the Supreme Court held in Peters v. Hobby that the removal of a consultant to the Civil Service Commission by the commission's Loyalty Review Board was invalid. The case had little impact, since by then the Loyalty Review Board was only defending old cases and had been dismantled by a 1953 Executive Order.

== Revocation and Repeal ==
Executive Order 10450, signed by President Eisenhower in April 1953, revoked Executive Order 9835 and extended the restrictions to all other jobs in the US government. However, both Executive Order 9835 and Executive Order 10450 were later repealed when US President Bill Clinton signed Executive Order 12968 in 1995 and Executive Order 13087 in 1998.

== See also ==
- Espionage Act of 1917
- List of organizations described as Communist fronts by the US government
- Venona
