= James M. Cole =

American attorney (born 1952)

James Cole
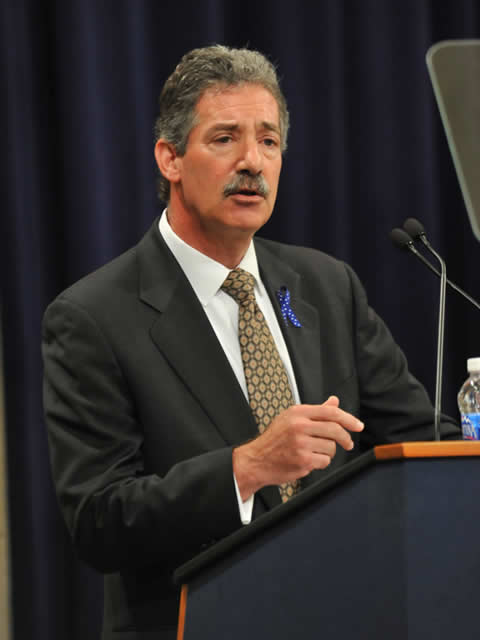

35th United States Deputy Attorney General
- In office December 29, 2010 – January 8, 2015
- President: Barack Obama
- Attorney General: Eric Holder
- Preceded by: David W. Ogden
- Succeeded by: Sally Yates

Personal details
- Born: James Michael Cole; May 2, 1952 (age 74) Evanston, Illinois, U.S.
- Party: Democratic
- Education: University of Colorado, Boulder (BA); University of California, Hastings (JD)

James Michael Cole (born May 2, 1952) is an American attorney who served as United States Deputy Attorney General from December 29, 2010 to January 8, 2015. He was first installed as Deputy Attorney General following a recess appointment by President Barack Obama on December 29, 2010. He then was confirmed by the United States Senate in a 55–42 vote on June 28, 2011.

== Early life and education ==
Cole earned a B.A. degree in 1975 from the University of Colorado Denver and a J.D. degree from the University of California, Hastings College of the Law in 1979.

== Professional career ==
Cole worked in the United States Department of Justice for 13 years, from 1979 until 1992, when he entered private practice. During his time in the DOJ's Public Integrity Section, Cole successfully prosecuted two federal judges on corruption charges, including Judge Robert Frederick Collins in 1991. Even after leaving the DOJ, Cole remained involved in matters related to the federal government, serving in 1996 and 1997 as the special counsel to the United States House Committee on Standards of Official Conduct (known as the House Ethics Committee) during the investigation of Newt Gingrich on ethics violations.

Cole was a partner at the law firm Bryan Cave LLP from 1995 until December 2010.

In 2004, Cole and his law firm were hired as part of a 2004 agreement with the government to monitor AIG's regulatory compliance, financial reporting, whistle-blower protection and employee retention policies, submitting confidential reports to the Justice Department and the Securities and Exchange Commission.

After serving as Deputy Attorney General, Cole moved to Sidley Austin, where he was made partner.

== Deputy Attorney General ==
On May 21, 2010, President Barack Obama nominated Cole for Deputy Attorney General to replace David W. Ogden, who returned to private law practice. Senate Republicans blocked his confirmation vote. He waited five months for a Senate vote on his nomination, the longest delay to fill that position in 30 years, before Obama gave him a recess appointment on December 29.

On May 5, 2011, U.S. Senate Majority Leader Harry Reid filed for cloture of Cole's nomination on which a roll call vote was held on May 9, 2011. The motion, which required 60 votes to be agreed to, was rejected by a vote of 50-40 with 10 Senators not voting.

On June 23, Reid announced on the Senate floor that a full Senate vote on Cole's nomination would take place on June 28. Earlier in the week, Reid had reached a unanimous consent agreement with Republican leaders in the Senate to pave the way for a vote on the nominations of Cole and two other nominees to Department of Justice positions without the need for another cloture vote. The Senate then confirmed Cole in a 55–42 vote on June 28.

On June 29, Cole authored a letter expressing the federal government's new policy regarding the enforcement of marijuana offenses in states which have medical marijuana laws. This memo effectively rescinded the previous mandate directing federal resources only for those not compliant with state law. The new policy disregarded state law compliance and instead authorizes enforcement on all "persons who are in the business of cultivating, selling, or distributing marijuana and those who knowingly facilitate such activities".

In August, Cole announced that the Department of Justice would file suit to prevent AT&T acquiring T-Mobile from Deutsche Telekom, saying that would lead to "tens of millions of consumers in the United States facing higher prices, poorer quality services, fewer choices, and lower quality products for their mobile wireless service." AT&T subsequently withdrew its application for Federal Communications Commission approval of the deal. Attorney General Eric Holder said that Cole "ultimately authorized the subpoena" to secretly obtain phone records from The Associated Press.

In February 2012, Joseph Rannazzisi, chief of the Drug Enforcement Administration's Office of Diversion Control, issued immediate suspension orders against Cardinal Health's supply of oxycodone to suspected pill mills. Deputy Attorney General Cole then called Rannazzisi to a meeting at Justice Department headquarters where Cole warned him "it made good sense to listen to what Cardinal had to say". Rannazzisi was fired from the drug diversion office in August 2015. Cardinal was never fined.

In a 2014 meeting, Cole said a new encryption policy for iMessage would hinder criminal investigations.

== Memorandum ==
On August 29, 2013, the Department of Justice published a memorandum authored by Cole which described a new set of priorities for federal prosecutors operating in states which had legalized the medical or other adult use of marijuana. It followed a 2009 memorandum from Deputy Attorney General David W. Ogden directing U.S. Attorneys in the Western United States to "not focus federal resources in your States on individuals whose actions are in clear and unambiguous compliance with existing state laws providing for the medical use of marijuana". The memorandum was rescinded by Attorney General Jeff Sessions on January 4, 2018.

Legal offices
Preceded by Gary Grindler; Acting	United States Deputy Attorney General; 2010–2015	Succeeded by Sally Quillian Yates; Acting
