= Eric Holder =

American lawyer (born 1951)

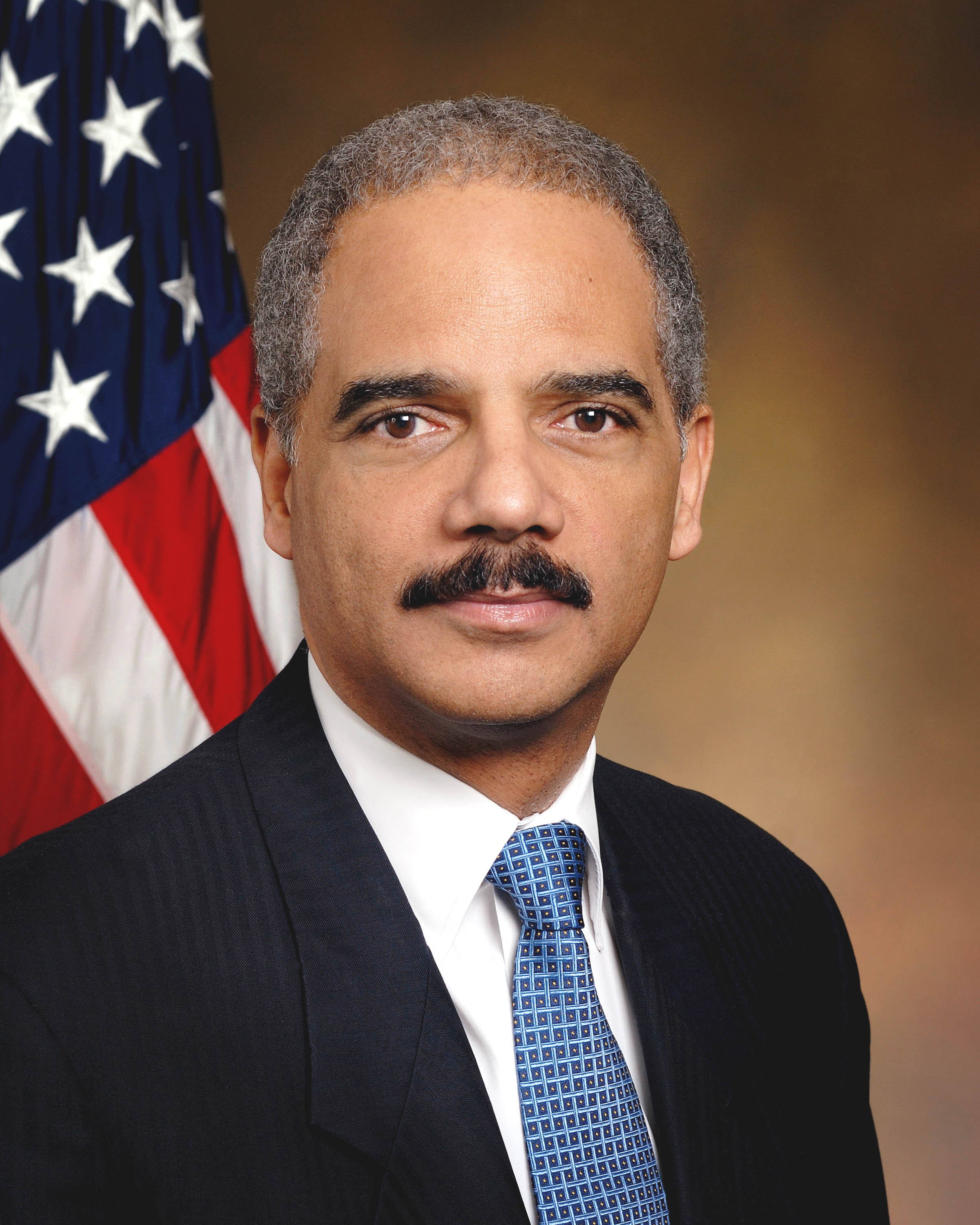
- Official portrait, 2009

82nd United States Attorney General
- In office February 3, 2009 – April 27, 2015
- President: Barack Obama
- Deputy: David W. Ogden; Gary Grindler (acting); James M. Cole; Sally Yates (acting)
- Preceded by: Michael Mukasey
- Succeeded by: Loretta Lynch
- Acting
- In office January 20, 2001 – February 2, 2001
- President: George W. Bush
- Deputy: Robert Mueller (acting)
- Preceded by: Janet Reno
- Succeeded by: John Ashcroft

29th United States Deputy Attorney General
- In office June 13, 1997 – January 20, 2001
- President: Bill Clinton
- Preceded by: Jamie Gorelick
- Succeeded by: Larry Thompson

48th United States Attorney for the District of Columbia
- In office January 20, 1993 – June 13, 1997
- President: Bill Clinton
- Preceded by: John Ramsey Johnson
- Succeeded by: Mary Lou Leary

Judge of the Superior Court of the District of Columbia
- In office 1988–1993
- Appointed by: Ronald Reagan
- Preceded by: Virginia Riley
- Succeeded by: Judith Bartnoff

Personal details
- Born: Eric Himpton Holder Jr. January 21, 1951 (age 75) New York City, New York, U.S.
- Party: Democratic
- Spouse: Sharon Malone (m. 1990)
- Children: 3
- Relatives: Vivian Malone Jones (sister-in-law); Jeff Malone (nephew)
- Education: Columbia University (BA, JD)
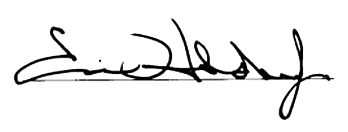
- Signature
- Holder's voice Holder on voter ID laws in Wisconsin. Recorded October 16, 2014

Eric Himpton Holder Jr. (born January 21, 1951) is an American lawyer who served as the 82nd United States attorney general from 2009 to 2015. A member of the Democratic Party, Holder was the first African American to hold the position.

Born in New York City to a middle-class family of Bajan origin, Holder graduated from Stuyvesant High School, Columbia College, and Columbia Law School. Following law school, he worked for the Public Integrity Section of the U.S. Department of Justice for twelve years. He next served as a judge of the Superior Court of the District of Columbia before being appointed by President Bill Clinton as U.S. attorney for the District of Columbia and subsequently U.S. deputy attorney general.

Holder prosecuted cases involving government corruption. While U.S. attorney, he prosecuted congressman Dan Rostenkowski for corruption charges related to his role in the Congressional Post Office scandal. Following the Clinton administration, he worked at Covington & Burling, representing the firm's multinational corporate clients in litigation. Holder was senior legal advisor to Barack Obama during his 2008 presidential campaign and one of three members of his vice-presidential selection committee. Holder was a close ally and confidante of Obama's and was selected as his first attorney general.

Holder became the first sitting attorney general to be held in contempt of Congress during an investigation of the Operation Fast and Furious ATF gunwalking scandal. The Justice Department's inspector general under Obama refused to prosecute him and later cleared him of the charges. After he was succeeded as attorney general by Loretta Lynch in April 2015, Holder returned to Covington & Burling, where he continues to practice corporate litigation, primarily for financial firms, and is also involved with efforts at gerrymandering reform through the National Democratic Redistricting Committee.

== Early life and education ==
Eric Himpton Holder Jr. was born in the Bronx, New York, on January 21, 1951, to parents with roots in Barbados. Holder's father, Eric Himpton Holder Sr. (October 29, 1903 – February 12, 1998), was born in Saint Joseph, Barbados, and arrived in the United States at the age of 11. He later became a real estate broker. His mother, Miriam (January 25, 1924 – August 13, 2010), was born in New Jersey, while his maternal grandparents were emigrants from Saint Philip, Barbados. Holder grew up in East Elmhurst, Queens, and attended public school until the age of 10. When entering the 4th grade he was selected to participate in a program for intellectually gifted Black students.

In 1969, he graduated from Stuyvesant High School in Manhattan and attended Columbia University, where he played freshman basketball and football, and was a teammate of actor Ed Harris. During that time, he lived in Carman Hall. He earned a B.A. degree in American history in 1973. Holder received his J.D. degree from Columbia Law School, graduating in 1976. He worked for the NAACP Legal Defense and Educational Fund during his first summer and the United States Attorney for the Southern District of New York during his second summer.

In 1969, while a freshman at Columbia, Holder was one of several dozen students who staged an occupation of the Reserve Officers' Training Corps (ROTC) office, renaming it as the Malcolm X student center. At that time Holder was a member of the Student Afro-American Society which had ties to the student activist organization Students for a Democratic Society (SDS). In explanation for the occupation of the ROTC office the students said they needed the space because of "the general racist nature of American society."

== Career ==
After graduating from Columbia Law School, Holder joined the U.S. Justice Department's new Public Integrity Section, where he worked from 1976 to 1988. During his time there, he assisted in the prosecution of Democratic Congressman John Jenrette for bribery discovered in the Abscam sting operation. In 1988, President Reagan appointed Holder to serve as a judge of the Superior Court of the District of Columbia.

Holder stepped down from the bench in 1993 to accept an appointment as United States Attorney for the District of Columbia from President Bill Clinton. He was the first Black American U.S. Attorney in that office. At the beginning of his tenure, he oversaw the conclusion of the corruption case against Dan Rostenkowski, part of the Congressional Post Office scandal. He was a U.S. Attorney until his elevation to Deputy Attorney General in 1997. Holder also served on The George Washington University's Board of Trustees in 1996 and 1997.

=== Deputy Attorney General ===
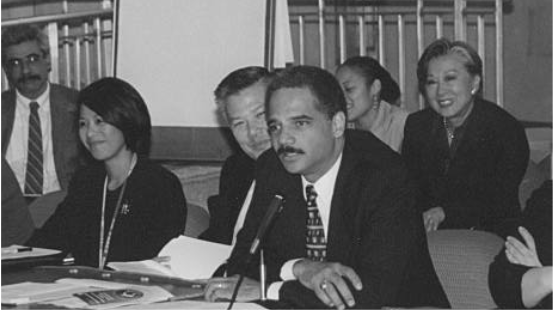
Holder opening an Interagency Working Group meeting of the White House Initiative on Asian Americans hosted by the Department of Justice on October 18, 2000.

In 1997, after the retirement of Jamie Gorelick, Clinton nominated Holder to be the Deputy Attorney General under Janet Reno. Holder was confirmed several months later in the Senate by a unanimous vote. During his confirmation hearing, Holder's opposition to the death penalty was questioned, but he pledged his intention to cooperate with the current laws and Reno, saying, "I am not a proponent of the death penalty, but I will enforce the law as this Congress gives it to us." Holder was the first African American to serve in that position.

As Deputy Attorney General, Holder's primary responsibilities were in the areas of budget and personnel issues; this also included resolving disputes among department heads and briefing reporters on policy initiatives, national security issues, and major investigations, including the Federal Bureau of Investigation (FBI) investigations into allegations of bribery and corruption in the 2002 Winter Olympics in Salt Lake City. Holder later advised Reno in the matters regarding the Independent Counsel statute. Reno made the decision to permit Kenneth Starr to expand his investigation into the Lewinsky affair, leading to Clinton's impeachment.

In the wake of the murders of Matthew Shepard and James Byrd Jr., Holder was a vocal proponent of new hate crimes laws in the United States. Holder said that the current laws placed major constraints on the ability of federal investigators and prosecutors to assist in these types of cases.

In his final days with the Clinton administration, Holder carried out his duties with Clinton's last-minute pardon of fugitive and Democratic contributor Marc Rich. Regarding discussions with the White House lawyers on the issue, Holder said he was at first "neutral" on the decision to grant Rich a pardon, but might lean in favor of it if there were national security benefits. Holder said that he was told that Israeli Prime Minister Ehud Barak had asked Clinton to grant the pardon. Holder said that, at the time, he did not give the case much thought, because he did not think the pardon would be granted, as no fugitive had ever previously been granted a presidential pardon. He later said he wished that he had looked into it more thoroughly, and expressed regret over the incident. "I wish that I had ensured that the Department of Justice was more fully informed and involved in this pardon process", he said admitting the mistake.

Republicans on the House Government Reform Committee disagreed with Holder's version and alleged that he was a knowing participant, according to a 2003 report. They said Holder failed to fully inform prosecutors of the pending pardon, and they criticized his "neutral leaning favorable" opinion to Clinton.

Former FBI director, Louis Freeh, commented on the matter in 2009, saying that the Clinton White House had "used" Holder and kept both the FBI and the Department of Justice (DOJ) in the dark as to their full activities around the last minute pardons.

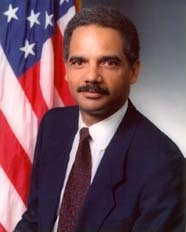
Official photo as Deputy Attorney General, c. 2000

Holder briefly served as Acting Attorney General under President George W. Bush until the Senate confirmed Bush's nominee John Ashcroft.

=== Private practice ===
From 2001 until he became attorney general, Holder worked as an attorney at Covington & Burling in Washington, D.C., representing clients such as Merck and the National Football League. He represented the NFL during its dog fighting investigation against Michael Vick.

In 2004, Holder helped negotiate an agreement with the Justice Department for Chiquita Brands International in a case that involved Chiquita's payment of "protection money" to the United Self-Defense Forces of Colombia (AUC), a group on the U.S. government's list of foreign terrorist organizations. In the agreement, Chiquita's officials pleaded guilty and paid a fine of $25 million. Holder represented Chiquita in the civil action that grew out of this criminal case. In March 2004, Holder and Covington & Burling were hired by Illinois Governor Rod Blagojevich to act as a special investigator to the Illinois Gaming Board. The investigation was subsequently canceled on May 18, 2004.

The firm represented Guantanamo inmates but Holder "never participated directly in the firm's Guantanamo work" and was not expected to recuse himself from matters pertaining to it.

In October 2004, he defended Purdue Pharma in a West Virginia court against accusations of deceptive marketing of their product OxyContin.

During his years in private practice, Holder represented the Swiss private bank UBS. Because of this, he recused himself from participating in the Department of Justice investigation of UBS's abetting of tax evasion by U.S. account-holders and the prosecution of Brad Birkenfeld. (As Attorney General, he also recused himself from the Roger Clemens contempt of Congress prosecution because the pitcher was once a client of Covington and Burling.)

While District of Columbia v. Heller was being heard by the U.S. Supreme Court in 2008, Holder joined the Reno-led amicus brief, which urged the Supreme Court to uphold Washington, D.C.'s handgun ban and said the position of the Department of Justice, from Franklin Delano Roosevelt through Clinton, was that the Second Amendment does not protect an individual right to keep and bear arms for purposes unrelated to a State's operation of a well-regulated militia. Holder said that overturning the 1976 law "opens the door to more people having more access to guns and putting guns on the streets."

In late 2007, Holder joined then-Senator Barack Obama's presidential campaign as a senior legal advisor. He served on Obama's vice presidential selection committee.

== Nomination as Attorney General of the United States ==
On December 1, 2008, President-elect Obama announced that Holder would be his nominee for Attorney General of the United States. Obama praised his "toughness and independence." Obama went on to say that "[Holder] is deeply familiar with the law enforcement challenges we face: from terrorism to counter-intelligence; from white-collar crime to public corruption." Holder emphasized national security as a priority if confirmed, "We can and we must ensure that the American people remain secure and that the great Constitutional guarantees that define us as a nation are truly valued."

He was formally nominated on January 20, 2009, and was overwhelmingly approved by the Senate Judiciary Committee on January 28 with a bipartisan vote of 17 to 2. He was officially confirmed by the entire Senate on February 2, 2009, by a vote of 75 to 21 becoming the nation's first African-American Attorney General. His installation took place on February 3, 2009, at the Lisner Auditorium of George Washington University.

== Tenure as United States Attorney General ==
=== Terrorism ===
==== Defending U.S. drone strikes and raids ====
As Attorney General, Holder was a staunch opponent of legal limitations on the executive branch's ability to prosecute the war on terror. In May 2011, Holder testified before Congress on the legality of the operation in which U.S. special forces killed Osama bin Laden earlier that month. Holder testified that the operation to kill bin Laden was legal, stating that international law allows for targeting enemy commanders. To support this point, Holder said that computer evidence seized from the raid demonstrated that bin Laden was still leading al-Qaeda. Moreover, Holder said, the Navy SEAL team that carried out the raid conducted itself in a manner consistent with American values, and that the parameters of the mission included capturing bin Laden.

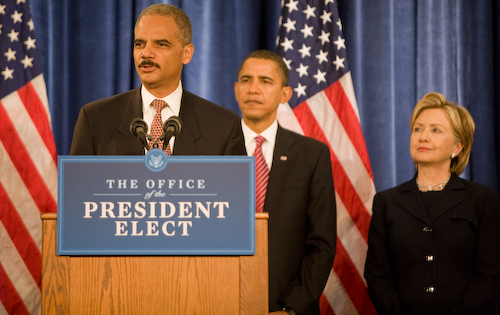
Holder with Barack Obama and Hillary Clinton on December 2, 2008

Holder defended the legality of drone strikes against alleged terrorists. Addressing the death of Anwar al-Awlaki, an American citizen who was killed by drone strike without trial, Holder said "The U.S. government's use of lethal force in self-defense against a leader of al-Qaeda or an associated force who presents an imminent threat of violent attack would not be unlawful." He outlined a three-part test to affirm the lawfulness of the strikes: the terrorist poses an imminent threat of violence to the United States, capture is not possible and the operation is conducted in a manner consistent with the principles of the law of war. At the time, al-Awlaki was an alleged leader and recruiter for Al-Qaeda in the Arabian Peninsula. Holder later stated that "'[d]ue process' and 'judicial process' are not one and the same, particularly when it comes to national security. The Constitution guarantees due process, not judicial process." Some civil liberties advocates have described the incident as "an extrajudicial execution" that breached al-Awlaki's right to due process, including a trial.

==== Terrorism prosecutions ====
A major legacy of Holder's tenure as attorney general was a shifting of terrorism cases to the civilian federal courts. Under Holder, the DOJ successfully tried many terrorists in federal court, securing convictions and life sentences against a string of defendants, including Sulaiman Abu Ghaith (Osama bin Laden's spokesman); Ahmed Ghailani (a conspirator in the 1998 East Africa bombings); and Abu Hamza (an al-Qaeda operative). Faisal Shahzad (the attempted Times Square bomber); and Omar Farouk Abdulmutallab (the failed "underwear bomber") pleaded guilty in federal court and were sentenced to life imprisonment during Holder's term. During Holder's term, other terrorists—including Najibullah Zazi (who plotted a New York subway attack), and Ahmed Abdulkadir Warsame (an al-Shabab supporter) pleaded guilty and cooperated with the government. Matt Olsen, the director of the National Counterterrorism Center from 2011 to 2014, wrote in 2015: "Through his persistence, Holder demonstrated the wisdom and value of prosecuting terrorists in civilian courts and cemented this approach for future administrations."

In November 2009, Holder announced that September 11 attack co-conspirators—Khalid Sheikh Mohammed, Ramzi Bin al-Shibh, Walid bin Attash, Ali Abdul Aziz Ali and Mustafa Ahmed al-Hawsawi—would be tried in New York City on federal charges of conspiracy and murder. Holder said at the time that the five would "stand trial in our justice system before an impartial jury under long-established rules and procedures." This plan was frustrated by Congress, however, and "congressional restrictions on transferring Guantánamo detainees to federal court had delayed the case indefinitely." In April 2011, Holder was forced to drop plans for a federal trial and instead refer the five to military commissions; at the time, Holder criticized Congress for interfering in the prosecution, saying: "[Congress has] taken one of the nation's most tested counterterrorism tools off the table and tied our hands in a way that would have serious ramifications." The military commissions remain "mired in procedural delays, legal uncertainty and continued controversy" today.

==== International cooperation against terrorism ====
In July 2010, Holder attended a heads of state summit of the African Union in Kampala, Uganda, where he told African leaders that the U.S. would continue to support the African Union peacekeeping mission in Somalia. Holder also vowed to work closer with African officials to stop terrorism, and announced that the FBI would be providing a team of forensic specialists to help assist in the investigation of the terrorist bombings in Kampala during the World Cup.

In a July 2014 speech to diplomats, academics, and national security officials in Oslo, Holder called for international cooperation against terrorism in Syria and Iraq in order to stem the flow of foreign fighters. Holder specifically urged other nations to adopt conspiracy laws; carry out better undercover operations; share traveler information through Interpol; and "seek to stop individuals from becoming radicalized in the first place by putting in place strong programs to counter violent extremism in its earliest stages."

=== Civil rights ===
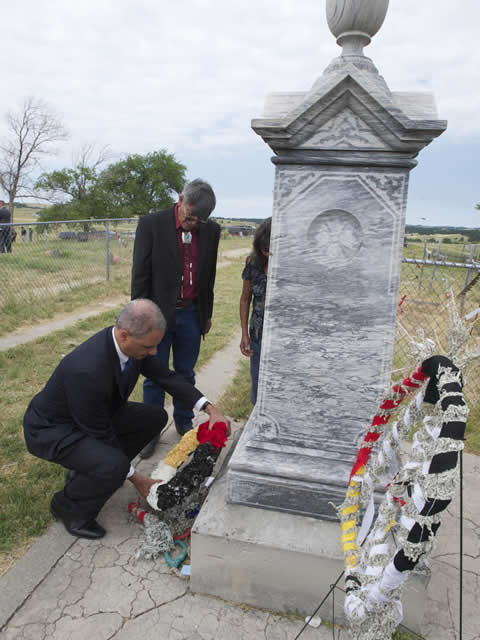
Holder laying a wreath at the memorial site of the Wounded Knee Massacre in South Dakota

==== Voting rights and redistricting ====
Holder is a vocal proponent of defending the Voting Rights Act of 1965, which was reauthorized in 2006 with bipartisan support. Holder has criticized new voter ID laws in Texas, Florida and other states, which he suggests may be politically motivated. In 2011, Holder said, "The reality is that in jurisdictions across the country, both overt and subtle forms of discrimination remain all too common." He went on to criticize Texas redistricting efforts, which were introduced when the state had increased its population by four million; Holder criticized the state for not allocating any new congressional seats to represent Hispanic voters, arguing that the majority of the increased population were Latinos.

Under Holder's tenure, the DOJ sued Shelby County, Alabama, for a violation of Section 5 of the Voting Rights Act. The small town of Calera had re-drawn the city council districts without receiving pre-clearance from the DOJ, which was required by Section 5 in order to ensure that Southern states do not use such redistricting to weaken political representation for minority communities. For local elections, Calera had divided the African-American part of town, submerging it into two other districts. The DOJ argued that this eliminated the city's sole African-American councilman. Calera responded by arguing that the process of pre-clearance with the DOJ should no longer be required. On September 21, 2011, the federal district court upheld the constitutionality of Section 5 of the Voting Rights Act, but the decision was overturned by the Supreme Court in Shelby County v. Holder, which effectively struck down Section 5 of the act. Before that decision, Holder had vowed to continue to enforce federal voting rights laws, regardless of how the United States Supreme Court decided in case. In 2022, Holder's book Our Unfinished March explained why the Shelby decision had convinced him to not appear in person before the Supreme Court Justices who rendered that decision, as a silent protest, as the custom had been for an AG to make at least one appearance. He further explained this in a subsequent interview.

In May 2012, with over a dozen states pushing new voter identification laws, Holder stated that he believed these new laws would hamper the ability of the elderly, students and minorities to vote. Regarding voting rights, he said, "for the first time in our [lifetimes], we are failing to live up to one of our most noble ideals." Holder pledged that the DOJ fight these laws "aggressively". He went on to say that "We have to honor the generations that took extraordinary risks" to achieve the right to vote.

In a speech before the NAACP in July 2012, Holder went on to say that the Texas voter ID laws were a "political pretext to disenfranchise American citizens of their most precious right." Holder compared the practices of these states to those in the era of Jim Crow segregation. Holder said, "Many of those without IDs would have to travel great distances to get them – and some would struggle to pay for the documents they might need to obtain them. We call those poll taxes."

==== Arizona immigration law ====
In May 2010, Holder expressed concerns over reports he had received regarding Arizona SB 1070, an Arizona immigration law. He said that he feared that the law could lead to racial profiling. Holder received criticism on the political right for criticizing the law before he had read it in its entirety.

In July 2010, after the DOJ reviewed the law, Holder filed suit against Arizona on the grounds that the state law is preempted by federal law. Holder was quoted as saying, "I understand, first off, the frustration of the people of Arizona and the concerns that they have with regard to the amount of illegal immigration that occurs, but the solution that the Arizona legislature came up with is inconsistent with our federal Constitution."

A lawsuit challenging the law was heard by the U.S. Supreme Court, and in June 2012, the Court struck down a majority of the law's provisions in Arizona v. United States. Holder said that although he was pleased that much of the law had been struck down, he remained concerned over the burden it might place on local law enforcement to enforce federal immigration law and the possibility that it might be used to discriminate against the Latino community. He vowed to continue to monitor the impact of the law.

Holder has also stated that he supports comprehensive immigration reform, adding that it is a "matter of civil rights and human rights".

==== Same-sex marriage ====
In February 2011, Holder announced that the DOJ would no longer defend cases involving the Defense of Marriage Act in court. Holder had recommended this course of action to the President, arguing that the Defense of Marriage Act was unconstitutional, as laws that prohibit the marriage of gay couples do not meet the legal principle of strict scrutiny. Holder cited changing law in support of his action: "Much of the legal landscape has changed in the 15 years since Congress passed DOMA. The Supreme Court has ruled that laws criminalizing homosexual conduct are unconstitutional. Congress has repealed the military's Don't Ask, Don't Tell policy. Several lower courts have ruled DOMA itself to be unconstitutional." This decision was prompted by legal deadlines in two federal cases in Connecticut and New York, where same-sex married couples argued that DOMA's ban on federal benefits to those in gay marriages approved by the individual states, violates the Constitution's requirement of equal treatment.

In February 2012, Holder reaffirmed his position and stated that the DOJ would not defend DOMA in a legal challenge brought by members of the U.S. military, who were seeking benefits for their same-sex spouses, including: medical insurance, visitation rights in military hospitals and survivor benefits.

Holder has also advocated for the interests of the 36,000 same-sex partnerships where Americans are in relationships with non-U.S. citizens. In May 2011, Holder set aside the decision to deport Paul Dorman, an Irish man who was in a same-sex partnership with a New Jersey citizen. Holder then asked immigration officials to reconsider their decision in order to determine whether Dorman can be considered a spouse under New Jersey law and whether Dorman would be considered a spouse under immigration law were it not for the Defense of Marriage Act. This action prompted some other immigration judges to halt the deportation proceeds of other foreigners in same-sex couples.

=== Criminal investigations and prosecutions ===
==== Ted Stevens case ====
In 2009, Holder decided to drop the corruption case against former Senator Ted Stevens of Alaska after evidence of prosecutorial misconduct (specifically, the withholding of exculpatory evidence) emerged. Holder was reportedly "horrified by the failure of prosecutors to turn over all relevant materials to the defense" and was alarmed at rebukes of federal prosecutors by Judge Emmet Sullivan, a friend and former colleague of Holder. The DOJ formally moved to dismiss the indictment against Stevens (who had been convicted the previous year on seven counts, but had never been sentenced) on April 1, 2009. Holder issued a statement reading: "After careful review, I have concluded that certain information should have been provided to the defense for use at trial. In light of this conclusion, and in consideration of the totality of the circumstances of this particular case, I have determined that it is in the interest of justice to dismiss the indictment and not proceed with a new trial." Judge Emmet Sullivan threw out the case several days later, issuing an order stating: "There was never a judgment of conviction in this case. The jury's verdict is being set aside and has no legal effect." Holder ordered a review of the case by the Office of Professional Responsibility of DOJ. Judge Sullivan conducted an inquiry of his own, appointed two attorneys to conduct an investigation which resulted in "a blistering 514-page report" (released in May 2012) detailing what went wrong in the prosecution, and criticizing three specific federal prosecutors (one of whom committed suicide in 2010) for concealing evidence. Holder was praised for his efforts to repair the damage caused by the affair, which was seen as "a profound embarrassment for the Justice Department."

==== Marijuana ====
In 2010, in the run up to the referendum on California Proposition 19, which would have legalized marijuana use for personal recreation, Holder stated that the DOJ would continue to prosecute individuals on the federal level for possession of marijuana even if voters approved a ballot measure. However, in the run up to the successful marijuana legalization referendums on Colorado Amendment 64 and Washington Initiative 502 in 2012, Holder and the Department of Justice remained silent on how they would respond if the ballot measures were enacted by voters. On November 6, 2012, Colorado Amendment 64 and Washington Initiative 502 were passed with 55.3% and 55.7% of the votes respectively. This would lead to a new memo released by Deputy Attorney General James M. Cole on August 29, 2013. The memo instructed all United States Attorneys to not focus limited prosecutorial resources on state-authorized marijuana related activities, provided they follow eight priorities laid out by the Department of Justice.

==== Organized crime ====
On January 20, 2011, the FBI arrested 127 members of the La Cosa Nostra in New York City, including members of all Five Families of New York City and the DeCavalcante family of New Jersey. Holder spoke at a press conference afterwards, celebrating the largest single-day operation against the Mafia in United States history.

==== Leak investigations ====
Under Holder's leadership, the Department of Justice brought six leak-related prosecutions against current or former U.S. government employees, while all previous presidential administrations combined had tried a total of three such cases. Holder was reportedly "surprised" by news reports pointing out this statistic, and was said to have told associates that he did not wish to have leak prosecutions be his legacy. Several prominent leak prosecutions under Holder involved communications between criminal defendants and journalists, and the pervasive use of traceable electronic communications between journalists and their sources provided the prosecution with a tool to determine the potential origin of published information. Under Holder, the Justice Department argued that journalists had no legal protection to maintain the confidentiality of their sources, and can be compelled by the government to reveal them, or potentially face criminal contempt charges. On September 17, 2018, the Freedom of the Press Foundation obtained documents regarding the use of FISA courts to spy on journalists.

On May 13, 2013, the Associated Press announced that the telephone records for 20 of their reporters during a two-month period in 2012 had been seized by the Justice Department as part of the 2013 Department of Justice investigations of reporters. The AP described these acts as a "massive and unprecedented intrusion" into their news-gathering operation. Holder testified under oath to the House Judiciary Committee that he had recused himself from these leak investigations to avoid any appearance of a conflict of interest. Holder said his Deputy Attorney General, James Cole was in charge of the AP investigation and would've ordered the subpoenas. When questioning turned to the possibility of journalists being charged under the Espionage Act for reporting classified material, Holder stated: "With regard to the potential prosecution of the press for the disclosure of material, that is not something that I've ever been involved in, heard of or would think would be a wise policy."

It was later reported that the DOJ monitored Fox News reporter James Rosen's activities by tracking his visits to the State Department through phone traces, timing of calls and his personal emails. NBC confirmed with the Justice Department that Holder had personally signed off on the Rosen subpoenas. The DOJ defended their decision and spoke about a balance between protecting national secrets and the 1st Amendment, stating: "After extensive deliberations, and after following all applicable laws, regulations and policies, the Department sought an appropriately tailored search warrant under the Privacy Protection Act." The revelation brought into question whether Holder had been intentionally misleading during his previous testimony. House Committee members sent an open letter to Holder, saying: "It is imperative that the committee, the Congress, and the American people be provided a full and accurate account of your involvement."

==== Gary McKinnon ====
Holder pursued the extradition to the United States of Gary Mckinnon, a Scottish IT expert based in London who in 2001 had hacked into US Military databases looking for information about Unidentified Flying Objects (UFOs). He reportedly secured the support of the then Director of Public Prosecutions for England and Wales, Keir Starmer, but the extradition was blocked by the UK Prime Minister, Theresa May.

=== Department of Justice Smart on Crime Program ===
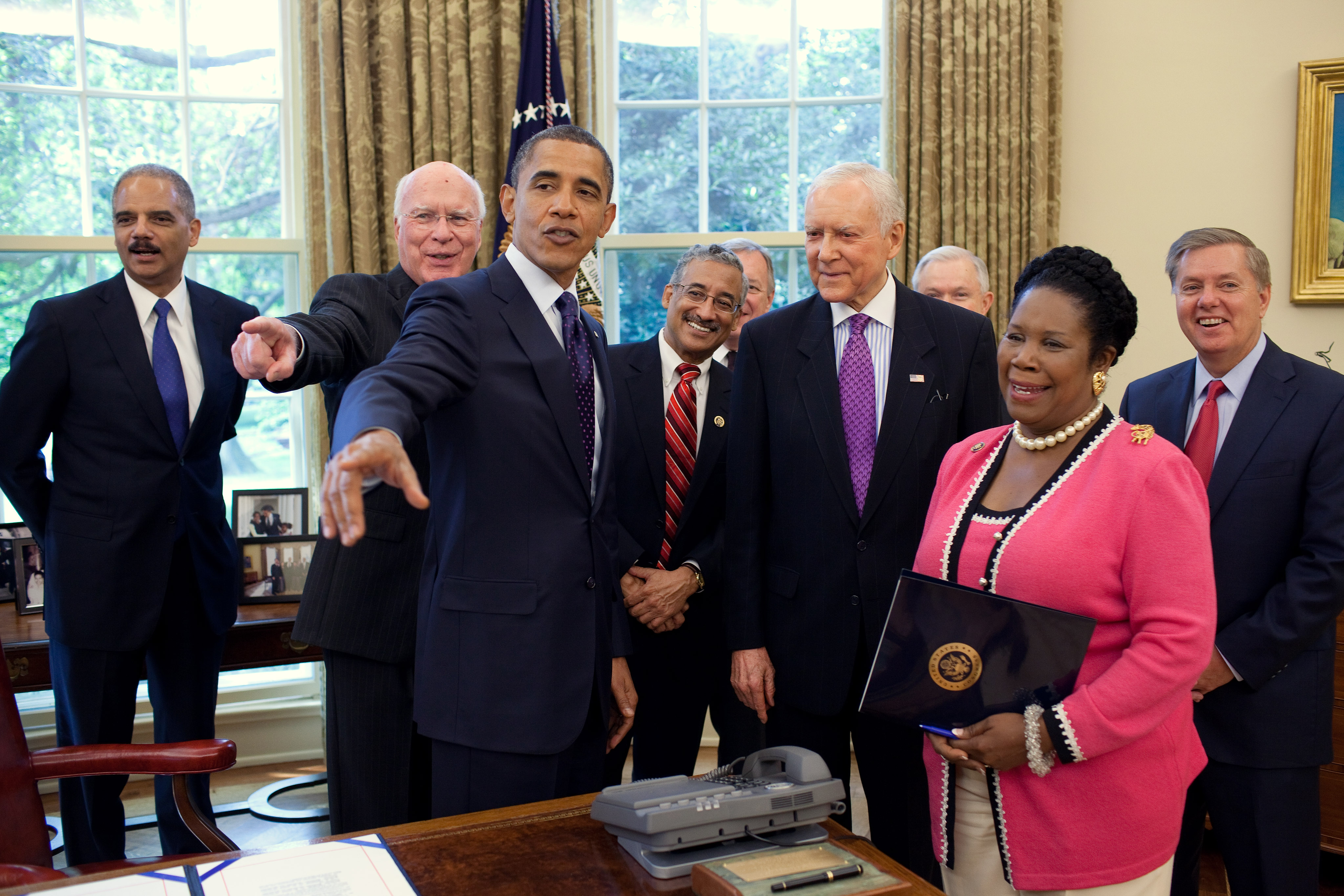
Barack Obama signing the Fair Sentencing Act in 2010

On August 12, 2013, at the American Bar Association's House of Delegates meeting, Holder announced the "Smart on Crime" program, which is "a sweeping initiative by the Justice Department that in effect renounces several decades of tough-on-crime anti-drug legislation and policies." Holder said the program "will encourage U.S. attorneys to charge defendants only with crimes "for which the accompanying sentences are better suited to their individual conduct, rather than excessive prison terms more appropriate for violent criminals or drug kingpins". Running through Holder's statements, the increasing economic burden of over-incarceration was stressed. As of August 2013, the Smart on Crime program is not a legislative initiative but an effort "limited to the DOJ's policy parameters."

=== Asset seizures ===
During Holder's tenure as attorney general, he prohibited the Justice Department from working with local law enforcement in asset forfeitures (confiscation of assets by law enforcement in cases where criminal wrongdoing has not been alleged) in cases that did not involve joint federal-local investigations and gun and child-porn crimes. As a consequence, asset forfeitures declined sharply in the United States.

=== Additional actions ===
In 2009, Holder announced and oversaw the federal government spending of $1 billion in grants to law enforcement agencies in every state to pay for the hiring of police officers. The money comes from the stimulus bill the American Recovery and Reinvestment Act of 2009 and covered the salaries of 4,699 law enforcement officers for three years.

When questioned about weapons regulations during a news conference to announce the arrest of Mexican drug cartel members, Holder stated that the Obama administration would seek to re-institute the expired Federal Assault Weapons Ban, which he strongly supports.

After the U.S. government filed suit against the Swiss bank UBS AG, whom Holder had represented during his time in private practice, the attorney general recused himself from all legal matters concerning the bank, which stands accused of conspiracy in U.S. tax fraud.

Holder presented friend and predecessor Janet Reno, Attorney General under the Clinton administration, the American Judicature Society's (AJS) Justice Award on April 17, 2009. The award is the highest given by the AJS, and recognizes significant contributions toward improvements in the administration of justice within the United States.

After the United States diplomatic cables leak in December 2010, Holder said that "We have an active, ongoing, criminal investigation with regard to this matter. We are not in a position as yet to announce the result of that investigation, but the investigation is—is ongoing. To the extent that we can find anybody who was involved in the breaking of American law and who has put at risk the assets and the people that I have described, they will be held responsible," Holder said. "They will be held accountable." Holder's comments leave open a crucial question, which is whether the investigators are looking at how WikiLeaks obtained the documents (not unlike probing a news organization's source), or if they're looking at whether WikiLeaks staffers violated criminal law and should be the ones indicted. In May 2016, more than a year after leaving office, Holder told David Axelrod in an interview he thought Edward Snowden had "performed a public service by raising the debate that we engaged in and by the changes that we made", adding "I would say that doing what he did—and the way he did it—was inappropriate and illegal". Republican Senate Majority Leader Mitch McConnell "lash[ed] out" at Holder, calling him "one of the worst attorneys general we've ever had" on Fox & Friends.

On December 8, 2014, Holder unveiled a new policy banning profiling on the basis of religion, gender, national origin, sexual orientation, and gender identity by federal law enforcement agencies. However, the new policy will not apply to screenings at border and airport, as well as in intelligence operations.

=== Opinion of Bush anti-terrorism policies ===
Holder has been critical of "enhanced interrogation techniques" and the NSA warrantless surveillance program, accusing the Bush administration of a "disrespect for the rule of law... [that is] not only wrong, it is destructive in our struggle against terrorism." During his confirmation hearings, he deemed waterboarding a form of torture and therefore illegal. In response, some Republican senators questioned him whether he would prosecute those who took part in waterboarding and delayed the confirmation vote on Holder.

Holder has stated that he favors closing the Guantánamo Bay detention camp; in 2002 he said that the detainees are not technically entitled to Geneva Convention protections. In March 2011, Holder left open the possibility that the Guantánamo Bay detention camp might remain open beyond President Obama's first term. Asked in a congressional hearing whether the prison would be closed by November 2012, Holder said: "I don't know." He said the Justice Department has established a task force to look at each of the 172 detainees being held at the Guantánamo prison to address how they should be dealt with. Holder's comments come just weeks after CIA Director Leon Panetta told a Senate panel that Osama bin Laden would probably be shipped to and held at the Guantánamo Bay facility if he were captured.

Holder is opposed to the Bush administration's implementation of the Patriot Act, saying it is "bad ultimately for law enforcement and will cost us the support of the American people."

=== Racism ===
Holder gave a speech on racism on February 18, 2009, during Black History Month. "Though this nation has proudly thought of itself as an ethnic melting pot in things racial, we have always been, and we, I believe, continue to be, in too many ways, essentially a nation of cowards," said Holder. "Though race-related issues continue to occupy a significant portion of our political discussion, and though there remain many unresolved racial issues in this nation, we, average Americans, simply do not talk enough with each other about things racial," he said.

The speech stirred some controversy, with some reacting favorably to Holder's comments and others sharply criticizing them. Obama later clarified Holder's comments, saying that "I think it's fair to say that if I had been advising my attorney general, we would have used different language... I think the point that he was making is that we're oftentimes uncomfortable with talking about race until there's some sort of racial flare-up or conflict, and that we could probably be more constructive in facing up to the painful legacy of slavery and Jim Crow and discrimination."

==== New Black Panther Party voter intimidation incident ====
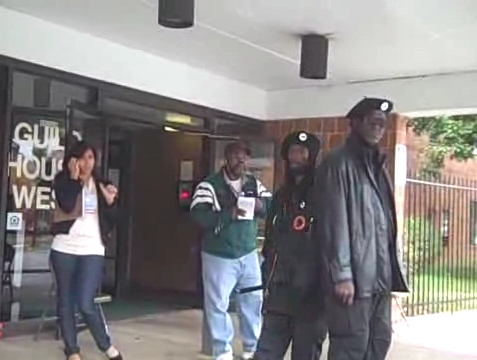
Alleged instance of voter intimidation in Philadelphia during the 2008 US presidential election.

In May 2009, Holder's Department of Justice completed a civil suit originally brought by J. Christian Adams of the Bush Justice Department against the New Black Panther Party, its chairman, and two of its members for voter intimidation due to their conduct during the 2008 election. Two members of the Party had stood outside a polling station during the election in paramilitary uniforms, one carrying a nightstick. Claiming a lack of evidence, the Department of Justice dropped charges against the party, its chairman, and one of the two members who had stood outside the polling station. With the evidence presented, the Department of Justice successfully obtained a narrow injunction against the other. Former lawyers who had served under the Bush administration have stated that the current DOJ under Holder is unwilling to prosecute minorities for civil rights violations. Three other Justice Department lawyers, in recent interviews, gave the same description of the department's culture, which department officials strongly deny. In the months after the case ended, tensions persisted. Eventually, Christopher Coates (of the Justice's Civil Rights Division) acknowledged telling attorneys at a September 2009 lunch that the Obama administration was interested in filing cases – under a key voting rights section – only on behalf of minorities.

During a meeting with a House subcommittee, Holder argued that the behavior of the New Black Panther Party was not comparable to historical voter intimidation against minorities, which often involved acts of violence and murder. Holder said, "When you compare what people endured in the South in the '60s to try to get the right to vote for African Americans, to compare what people subjected to that with what happened in Philadelphia. ... I think does a great disservice to people who put their lives on the line for my people."

Critics have interpreted this comment as evidence of racial bias on Holder's part, with conservative James Taranto of The Wall Street Journal arguing that "If he [Holder] approaches the job with the attitude that any group smaller than all Americans is 'my people', he is the wrong man for the position." Claiming the issue was politicized from the start, Democrats have argued that those on the political right, particularly Adams, used this incident for purely political gain.

=== Operation Fast and Furious ===
In May 2011, House Oversight Committee chairman, California Republican Rep. Darrell Issa and Iowa Republican Sen. Chuck Grassley sent Attorney General Holder a letter requesting details about Operation Fast and Furious, which had been a failed federal firearms sting operation that allegedly allowed some 2,000 weapons to reach Mexican drug gangs. Grassley and Issa urged Holder to cooperate and turn over subpoenaed records that would reveal the scope of the alleged government coverup.

=== Contempt of Congress ===
In October 2011, the Justice Department released 7,600 pages of documents on Operation Fast and Furious. Republicans claimed some of those documents indicated that Holder had been sent early memos about Fast and Furious and therefore must have known about it before early 2011, which is when he had testified that he had learned about it to the House Judiciary Committee; a later report from the Justice Department's independent inspector general found that Holder had "no prior knowledge" of the operation before early 2011.

In April 2012, Issa announced that his committee was drafting a Contempt of Congress resolution against Holder in response to the committee allegedly being "stonewalled by the Justice Department" on additional documents.

On June 19, 2012, Holder met with Issa in person to discuss the requested documents. Holder said he offered to provide the documents to Issa on the condition that Issa provided his assurance that doing so would satisfy the committee subpoenas and resolve the dispute. Issa rejected the offer. Holder then told reporters "They rejected what I thought was an extraordinary offer on our part."

On June 20, 2012, the Oversight Committee voted 23–17 along party lines to hold Holder in contempt of Congress for not releasing the additional documents the committee had requested. A memo from Holder's office said of the vote: "It's an election-year tactic intended to distract attention." Although the vote was not directly relevant to gun legislation, the National Rifle Association of America announced that it would be scoring the contempt vote, due to Holder's previous stances on gun control legislation, placing political pressure on Democrats that wished to avoid repercussions from the gun lobby.

On June 20—the same date as the Oversight Committee vote—President Obama asserted executive privilege over the remaining documents requested by the committee. While Democrats argued that Holder was carrying out his constitutional role by honoring the executive privilege claim, on June 28, 2012, House Speaker John Boehner scheduled a vote on the contempt resolution anyway. Holder became the first U.S. attorney general in history to be held in both criminal and civil contempt. He was held in contempt by the House of Representatives in a 255–67 vote, with 17 Democrats voting for the measure, 2 Republicans voting against the measure. The remaining Democrats refused to vote and marched out of the House, led by Nancy Pelosi, as a means of protesting the actions of Republicans. Holder responded to the vote, describing it as "the regrettable culmination of what became a misguided and politically motivated investigation in an election year."

The congressional action evoked reactions from across the political spectrum. Texas governor and Republican presidential candidate Rick Perry called on Holder to resign, stating "America simply cannot tolerate an attorney general who arms the very criminals he is supposed to protect us from". Republican Sen. John Cornyn, ranking member of the Subcommittee on Immigration, Refugees and Border Security also called on Holder to resign. Among those opposing the contempt citation, Democratic Rep. Elijah Cummings, the ranking member on the United States House Committee on Oversight and Government Reform said, "Holder has acted honorably; he's done everything he could to allow us to do our job, which is to investigate this matter."

The Justice Department declined to prosecute the attorney general on the contempt charge, citing the fact that President Obama had asserted executive privilege.

In September 2012, after a nineteen-month review, the United States Department of Justice Office of the Inspector General cleared the Attorney General of any wrongdoing with regard to Fast and Furious, stating that there was "no evidence" that Holder knew about the operation before early 2011. The report did cite fourteen lower ranking officials for possible disciplinary action. Holder responded to the internal investigation, saying "It is unfortunate that some were so quick to make baseless accusations before they possessed the facts about these operations – accusations that turned out to be without foundation and that have caused a great deal of unnecessary harm and confusion."

In retrospect, David Weigel of Bloomberg Businessweek called the contempt of Congress vote "both popular and stunningly ineffective, enraging Holder and turning him into a more outspoken and implacable foe of Republican policies on voting rights and policing."

In August 2014, federal judge Amy Berman Jackson ordered the Justice Department to provide Congress with a list of the previously withheld documents. In October 2014, Jackson rejected a House bid to hold Holder in contempt of court, stating that it was "entirely unnecessary." In January 2016, Jackson tossed out Obama's executive privilege claims but stressed that her ruling wasn't based on the merits of the claim, but instead on the fact that many of the documents had by then become public as part of the 2012 inspector general's report.

=== Operation Choke Point ===
Operation Choke Point was an ongoing initiative of the United States Department of Justice that was announced in 2013 and investigated banks in the United States and the business they did with payment processors, payday lenders, and other companies believed to be at higher risk for fraud, money laundering, and terrorist financing. This operation, first disclosed in an August 2013 Wall Street Journal story was controversial for the potential threat to due process, as the government was pressuring financial institutions to cut off a company's access to banking services without first having shown that the targeted companies were in fact violating the law.

=== Refusal to prosecute financial institutions ===
On March 6, 2013, Holder testified to the Senate Judiciary Committee that the size of large financial institutions has made it difficult for the Justice Department to bring criminal charges when they are suspected of crimes, because such charges can threaten the existence of a bank and therefore their interconnectedness may endanger the national or global economy. (See financial contagion). "Some of these institutions have become too large," Holder told the committee, "It has an inhibiting impact on our ability to bring resolutions that I think would be more appropriate."

In a January 29, 2013 letter to Holder, Senators Sherrod Brown and Charles Grassley had criticized this Justice Department policy citing "important questions about the Justice Department's prosecutorial philosophy." After receipt of a DOJ response letter, Brown and Grassley issued a statement saying, "The Justice Department's response is aggressively evasive. It does not answer our questions. We want to know how and why the Justice Department has determined that certain financial institutions are 'too big to jail' and that prosecuting those institutions would damage the financial system."

In 2012, financial fraud prosecutions by the Department of Justice were at 20-year lows. Holder has also endorsed the notion that prosecutors, when deciding to pursue white-collar crimes, should give special consideration to "collateral consequences" of bringing charges against large corporate institutions, as outlined in a 1999 memorandum by Holder. Nearly a decade later Holder, as head of the Department of Justice, put this into practice and has demonstrated the weight "collateral consequences" has by repeatedly sought and reached deferred prosecution and non-prosecution agreements and settlements with large financial institutions such as J.P. Morgan Chase, HSBC, Countrywide Mortgage, Wells Fargo, Goldman Sachs, and others where the institution pays a fine or penalty but faces no criminal charges and admits no wrongdoing. Whereas in the previous decade the Bush administration's Department of Justice often sought criminal charges against individuals of large institutions regardless of "collateral consequences" such as cases involving Enron, Adelphia Communications Corporation, Tyco International, and others.

In September 2014, he described the department's rationale in a speech at New York University:

Responsibility remains so diffuse, and top executives so insulated," Holder said, "that any misconduct could again be considered more a symptom of the institution's culture than a result of the willful actions of any single individual."

According to a 2016 report prepared by Republican staff of the House Committee on Financial Services, Holder and other Justice Department officials had overruled the recommendation of prosecutors to pursue criminal charges against HSBC for its alleged role in money-laundering, instead settling with the bank for the then-record amount of $1.9 billion.

=== Resolution proposing articles of impeachment ===
On November 14, 2013, Representative Pete Olson (R-TX), along with 19 Republicans, introduced a resolution proposing articles of impeachment against Holder. The articles cited Holder for his alleged role in Operation Fast and Furious, refusal to defend the Defense of Marriage Act in court, failing to prosecute anyone involved in the IRS targeting of groups based on name and political theme, and for allegedly perjuring himself by stating that he had no knowledge of any potential prosecution of members of the media for disclosure of classified material. There were 29 co-sponsors to the bill. The bill was referred to the House Committee on the Judiciary on November 14, 2013, but no further action was taken.

=== Resignation ===
Holder announced his resignation on September 25, 2014, citing personal reasons. He remained in office until the Senate confirmed his successor, Loretta Lynch.

== Return to private practice ==
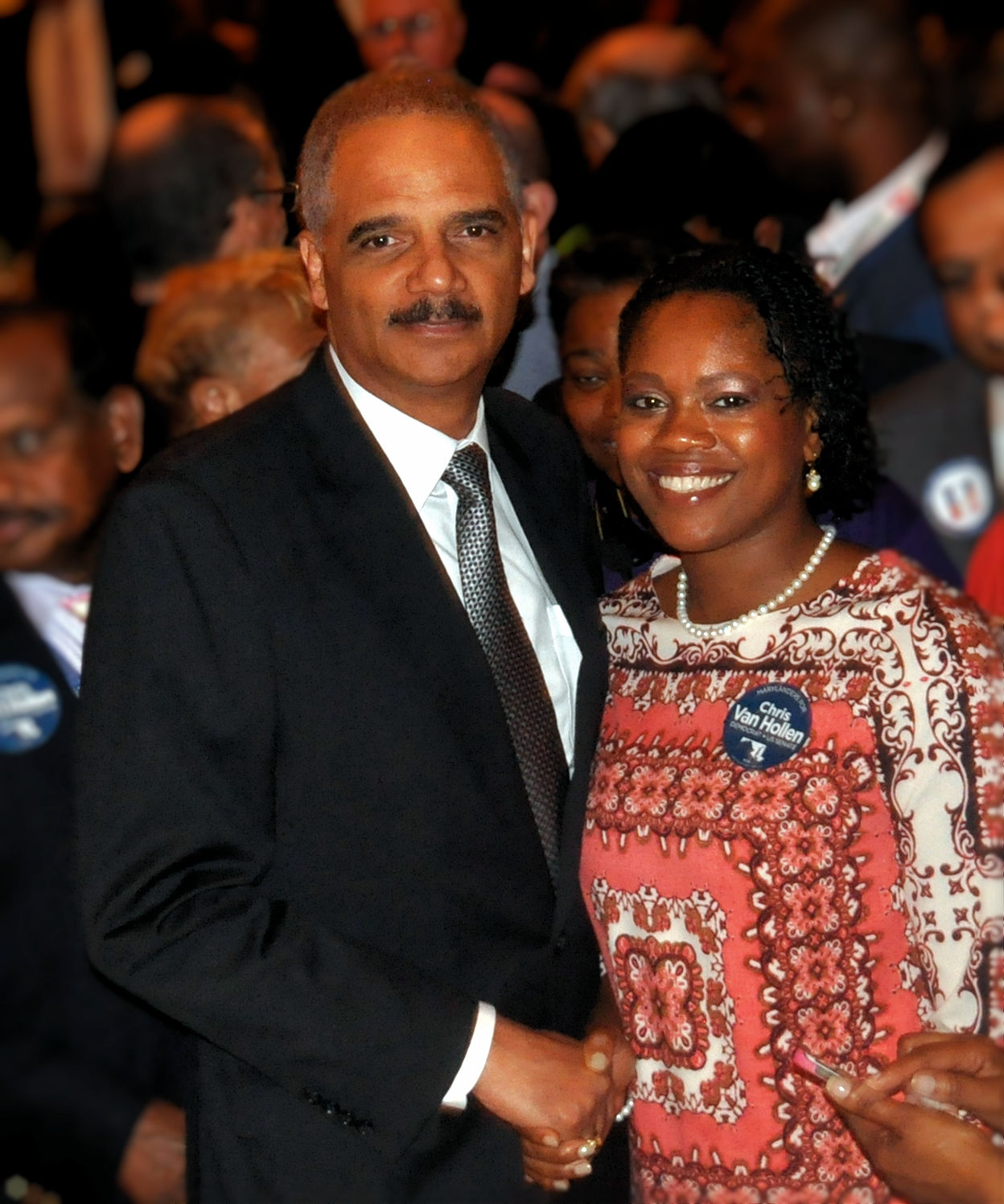
Holder at the 2016 Democratic National Convention

In July 2015, Holder rejoined Covington & Burling, the law firm at which he worked before becoming attorney general. The law firm's clients have included many of the large banks Holder declined to prosecute for their alleged role in the 2008 financial crisis.

In early 2016, Holder was hired by the MTN Group, a South Africa-based telecommunications company as a part of its efforts to combat a $3.9 billion fine handed to the MTN Group by the government of Nigeria. Rather than attempt to negotiate with the regulatory body that issued the fine, the Nigerian Communications Commission (NCC), Holder worked with the Nigerian Attorney General Abubakar Malami to reach a compromise. While the NCC initially rejected a proposal from Malami for a reduced fine, it later decided to reduce the fine by more than half. The MTN Group paid the reduced amount, which totaled around $1.7 billion.

In October 2016, Holder announced that he would chair the newly incorporated National Democratic Redistricting Committee, a group aiming to support Democratic candidates in state races ahead of the redistricting that will follow the 2020 census.

In February 2017, Uber hired Holder to help lead an investigation into claims of sexual harassment and discrimination made public by Susan Fowler, a former employee. In June, Holder delivered a 13-page document outlining his recommendations for Uber. This led to Uber firing over 20 employees. Emil Michael, who was CEO Travis Kalanick's right-hand man, also left the company. Kalanick himself was forced into taking an indefinite leave of absence, and a week later, under pressure from investors, resigned as the CEO.

During 2018, Holder suggested on several occasions that he might run for the presidency in 2020. In July, he told CNN he thought a presidential candidate needed five qualities—the ability to inspire others, a vision for the job, the ability to meet both the physical and mental strains of the job, and appropriate experience. Holder added that he believed he possessed those five qualities, but noted that his wife would be involved in his decision. In October 2018, Holder was one of multiple individuals targeted by mailed pipe-bombs sent to Democratic lawmakers and officials. On March 4, 2019, Holder announced that he would not seek the White House in 2020 but would continue his work with the National Democratic Redistricting Committee to help elect a Democratic candidate who had the five qualities he thought were necessary.

In 2023, Holder was one of the lawyers representing Tennessee politicians Justin Jones and Justin J. Pearson, who were expelled from the Tennessee House of Representatives for leading a protest in favor of gun control on the House floor.

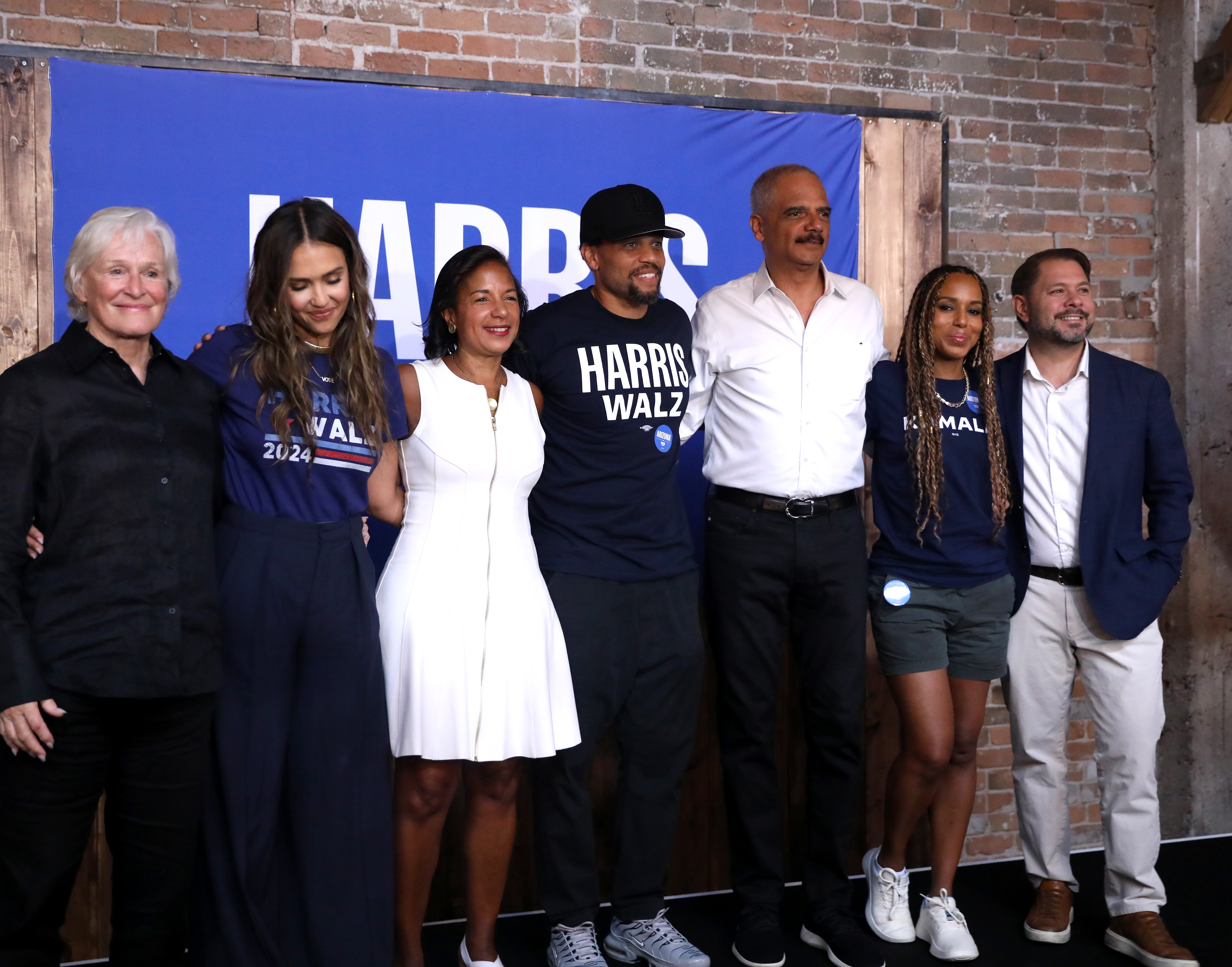
Holder (third from right) campaigning in Arizona support of Kamala Harris's presidential campaign alongside actresses Glenn Close and Jessica Alba, former UN ambassador Susan Rice, actor Michael Ealy, actress Kerry Washington, and congressman senate nominee Ruben Gallego

In July 2024, after Joe Biden withdrew from the 2024 United States presidential election and Vice President Kamala Harris launched her presidential campaign, Holder and his law firm Covington & Burling were hired to vet vice presidential nominees. On August 5, Harris chose Minnesota governor Tim Walz as her running mate.

== Personal life ==
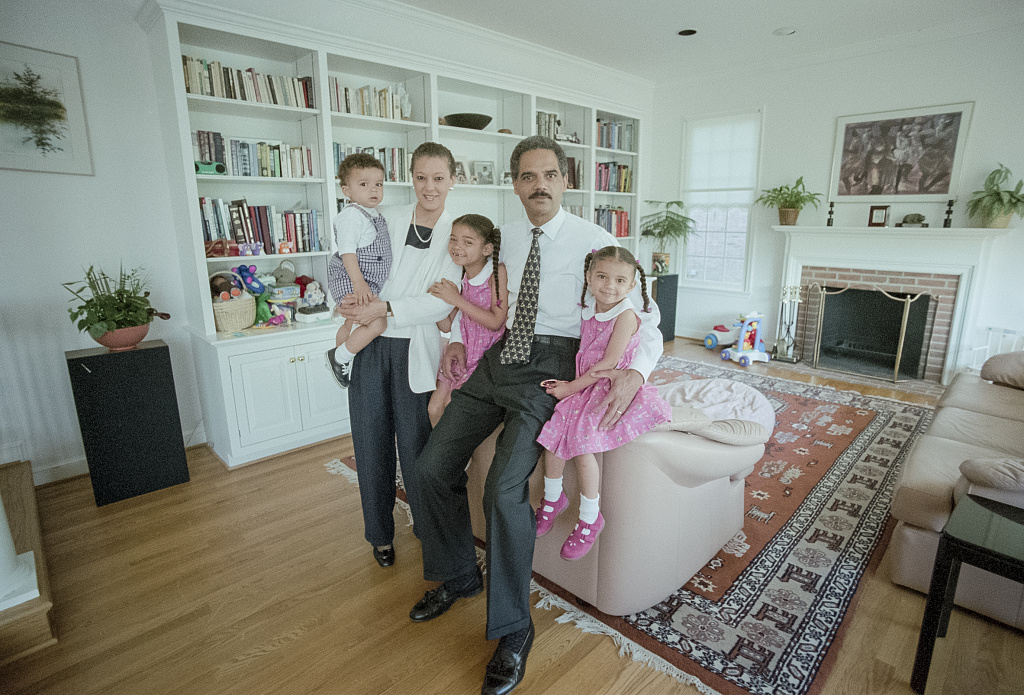
Holder with his wife and three children in 1999

Holder is married to Sharon Malone, an obstetrician and author. The couple has three children. Malone's sister was Vivian Malone Jones, famous for her part in the Stand in the Schoolhouse Door, which led to integration at the University of Alabama. Holder has been involved with various mentoring programs for inner-city youth. He is also an avid basketball fan and the uncle of former NBA All-Star Jeff Malone. Holder and his wife live in Washington, D.C.

== Awards ==
In May 2008, while he was still in private practice, Legal Times magazine named Holder as one of the "Greatest Washington Lawyers of the Past 30 Years," describing him as one of the "Visionaries." Also in that year, Holder was named by The National Law Journal as one of "the 50 Most Influential Minority Lawyers in America." The National Law Journal commended Holder's practice in the areas of civil litigation and white-collar defense, as well as his work as a national co-chair for Obama's campaign.

On May 16, 2010, Holder delivered the commencement address at Boston University, for both the all-university ceremony and the School of Law. In addition, he was presented with an honorary Doctor of Laws degree.

On May 22, 2011, Holder delivered the commencement address at the University of Virginia School of Law. Holder encouraged the graduates to emulate Virginia Law alumnus Robert F. Kennedy's legacy of service. On May 19, 2009, Holder was chosen by his alma mater, Columbia College, to be its Class Day Speaker.

In May 2009, Holder visited Barbados and met with government representatives from across the Caribbean. The government renamed the Tamarind Hall municipal building located at Tamarind Hall, Blackmans, St. Joseph after Holder. Now known as the Eric Holder Jr. Municipal Complex, this centre was constructed by Government of Barbados to house a Magistrate's Court, a police station, a branch of the public library, in addition to the St. Joseph district Post Office. The centre was officially opened on May 22, 2009, by the U.S. attorney general, Mr. Eric Holder Jr. while on a visit. In June 2009, the Government of Barbados announced that it would begin a project to determine the first 100 Great Barbadians, who would be selected by the public of Barbados. At the announcement of the project it was announced that Holder was the first candidate nominated for the final list.

In 2012, Holder received the Golden Plate Award of the American Academy of Achievement.

In August 2012, the National Urban League named Holder as a recipient of their "Living Legend" award, along with singer Stevie Wonder.

In April 2013, Holder acknowledged having the position of the President's 'wing-man' and being there as the President's 'boy' during a radio interview with Tom Joyner. These awards and recognition are noteworthy because they contradict Holder's own public position that there should be "...a distance between [an Attorney General] and the president."

Holder delivered the commencement address at Harvard Law School in May 2012, the UC Berkeley School of Law in May 2013, and the UCLA School of Law in June 2020.

Holder received an honorary Doctor of Laws from his alma mater, Columbia University, in May 2017.

== Publications ==
- Holder, Eric; Sam Koppelman (2022). Our Unfinished March: The Violent Past and Imperiled Future of the Vote—a History, a Crisis and a Plan. New York: One World. ISBN 9780593445747. OCLC 1312918124.

== See also ==
- List of African-American United States Cabinet members

Legal offices
Preceded by Jamie Gorelick	United States Deputy Attorney General; 1997–2001	Succeeded by Larry Thompson
Preceded by Janet Reno	United States Attorney General; Acting; 2001	Succeeded by John Ashcroft
Preceded by Michael Mukasey	United States Attorney General; 2009–2015	Succeeded by Loretta Lynch
U.S. order of precedence (ceremonial)
Preceded by Shaun Donovan as Former U.S. Cabinet Member	Order of precedence of the United States as Former U.S. Cabinet Member	Succeeded by Hilda Solis as Former U.S. Cabinet Member
