= Gary Grindler =

American lawyer

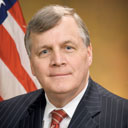

United States Deputy Attorney General
- Acting
- In office February 5, 2010 – December 29, 2010
- President: Barack Obama
- Preceded by: David W. Ogden
- Succeeded by: James M. Cole

Personal details
- Born: Gary Gage Grindler; July 10, 1950 (age 75) St. Louis, Missouri, U.S.
- Party: Democratic
- Education: Northwestern University (BA, JD)

Gary Gage Grindler (born July 10, 1950) is an American lawyer who served as acting United States Deputy Attorney General in 2010.

== Career ==
Grindler served as chief of staff to United States Attorney General Eric Holder until December 2012. Grindler served in a variety of other roles during the Clinton administration, including deputy assistant attorney general in the Criminal Division, principal associate deputy attorney general, counselor to the attorney general, deputy assistant attorney general in the Civil Division, and as an assistant U.S. attorney in the Southern District of New York and the Northern District of Georgia.

During the Ken Starr investigations, Grindler represented the United States Secret Service. He represented President Bill Clinton in his official capacity during depositions arising out of the Whitewater investigations.

During his tenure at the United States Department of Justice during the Obama administration, Grindler was criticized by congressional Republicans and an official report by the Office of the Inspector General for his involvement in Operation Fast and Furious.

Grindler served as a legal counsel and partner with the private law firm of King & Spalding from 2013 to 2018.

Since 2018, he has been a retired partner with King & Spalding.
