= Ross L. Malone =

American lawyer (1910–1974)

3rd United States Deputy Attorney General
- In office 1952 – January 20, 1953
- President: Harry S. Truman
- Preceded by: A. Devitt Vanech
- Succeeded by: William P. Rogers

Personal details
- Born: September 9, 1910 Roswell, New Mexico, U.S.
- Died: August 13, 1974 (aged 63) Roswell, New Mexico, U.S.
- Political party: Democratic

Rosser Lynn Malone Jr. (September 9, 1910 – August 13, 1974) was an American attorney who served as United States Deputy Attorney General from 1952 to 1953.
