= Peyton Ford =

American attorney

1st United States Deputy Attorney General
- In office May 24, 1950 – 1951
- President: Harry S. Truman
- Preceded by: Position established
- Succeeded by: A. Devitt Vanech

8th United States Assistant Attorney General for the Claims Division
- In office 1947–1949
- President: Harry S. Truman
- Preceded by: John F. Sonnett
- Succeeded by: H. Graham Morison

Personal details
- Born: February 24, 1911 Sayre, Oklahoma
- Died: November 22, 1971 (aged 60) Washington, D.C.
- Political party: Democratic

Peyton Ford (February 24, 1911 – November 22, 1971) was an American attorney who served as the United States Assistant Attorney General for the Claims Division from 1947 to 1949 and as United States Deputy Attorney General from 1950 to 1951.
