= Jamie Gorelick =

American lawyer

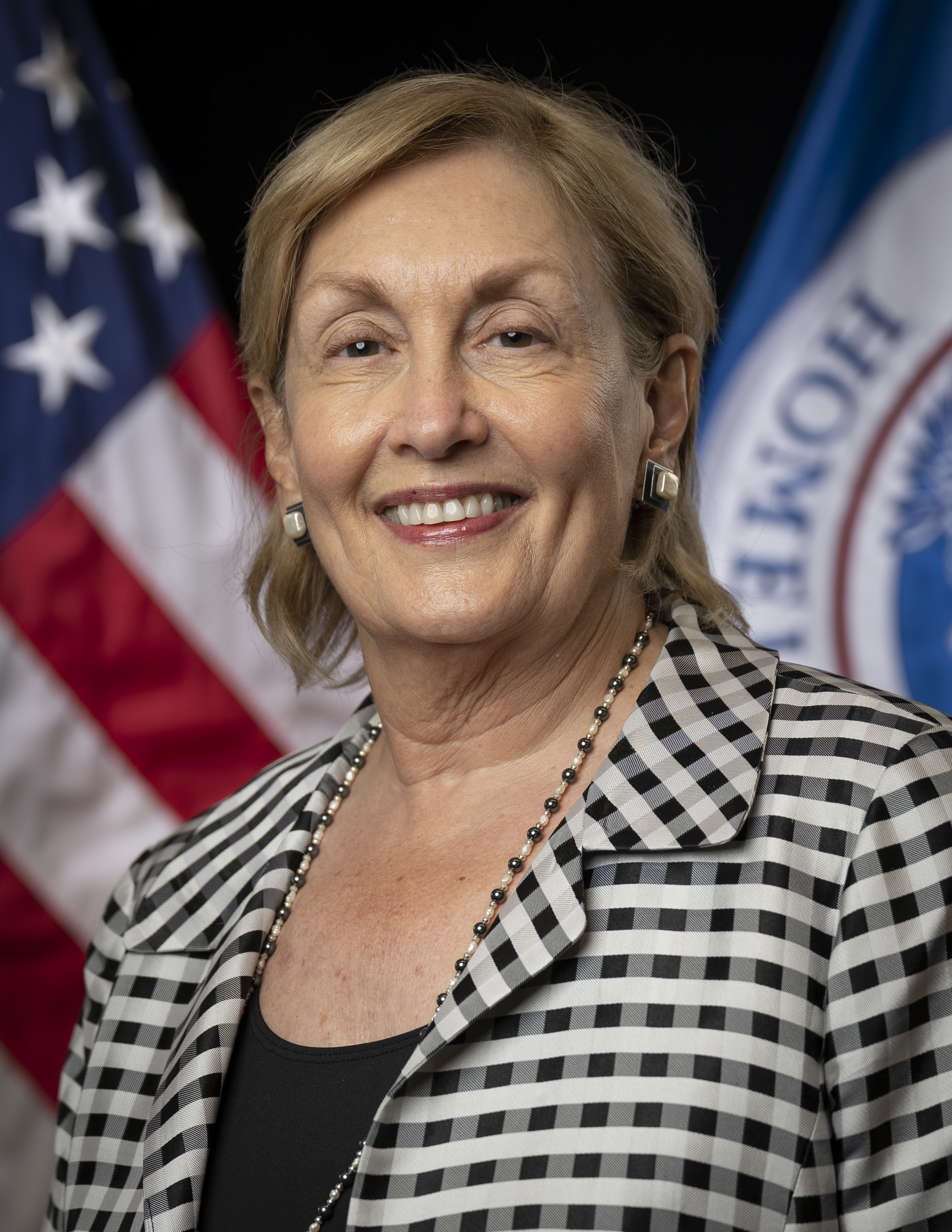
- Official portrait, 2022

Chair of the Homeland Security Advisory Council
- Incumbent
- Assumed office March 21, 2022 Serving with William Bratton
- President: Joe Biden; Donald Trump
- Preceded by: William Webster

28th United States Deputy Attorney General
- In office March 17, 1994 – May 1997
- President: Bill Clinton
- Preceded by: Philip Heymann
- Succeeded by: Eric Holder

General Counsel of the Department of Defense
- In office May 5, 1993 – March 17, 1994
- President: Bill Clinton
- Preceded by: David Addington
- Succeeded by: Judith Miller

Personal details
- Born: Jamie Shona Gorelick; May 6, 1950 (age 76) New York City, U.S.
- Party: Democratic
- Spouse: Richard Waldhorn (m. 1975)
- Children: 2
- Relatives: Shirley Gorelick (mother)
- Education: Harvard University (BA, JD)

Jamie Shona Gorelick (/ɡəˈrɛlɪk/; born May 6, 1950) is an American lawyer who served as the Deputy Attorney General of the United States from 1994 to 1997, during the Clinton administration. She has been a partner at WilmerHale since 2003 and has served on the board of directors of Amazon since February 2012.

Gorelick served on British Petroleum's Advisory Council, as their top legal counsel after the 2010 Deepwater Horizon oil spill. She was appointed by former Senate Democratic Leader Tom Daschle to serve as a commissioner on the bipartisan 9/11 Commission, which sought to investigate the circumstances leading up to the September 11 attacks, and also served as Vice Chairman of Fannie Mae.

== Early life and education ==
Gorelick was born in Brooklyn, New York City to Leonard and Shirley Gorelick, and grew up in Great Neck, New York, in a Jewish family. She attended Great Neck South High School, graduating in 1968. She went on to receive a J.D. cum laude from Harvard Law School in 1975.

Gorelick was president of the District of Columbia Bar from 1992 to 1993.

She is a law partner in the Washington office of WilmerHale and a member of the boards of Amazon.com, United Technologies Corporation, the John D. and Catherine T. MacArthur Foundation, the Carnegie Endowment for International Peace, and the Washington Legal Clinic for the Homeless and Legal Affairs.

== Deputy Attorney General ==
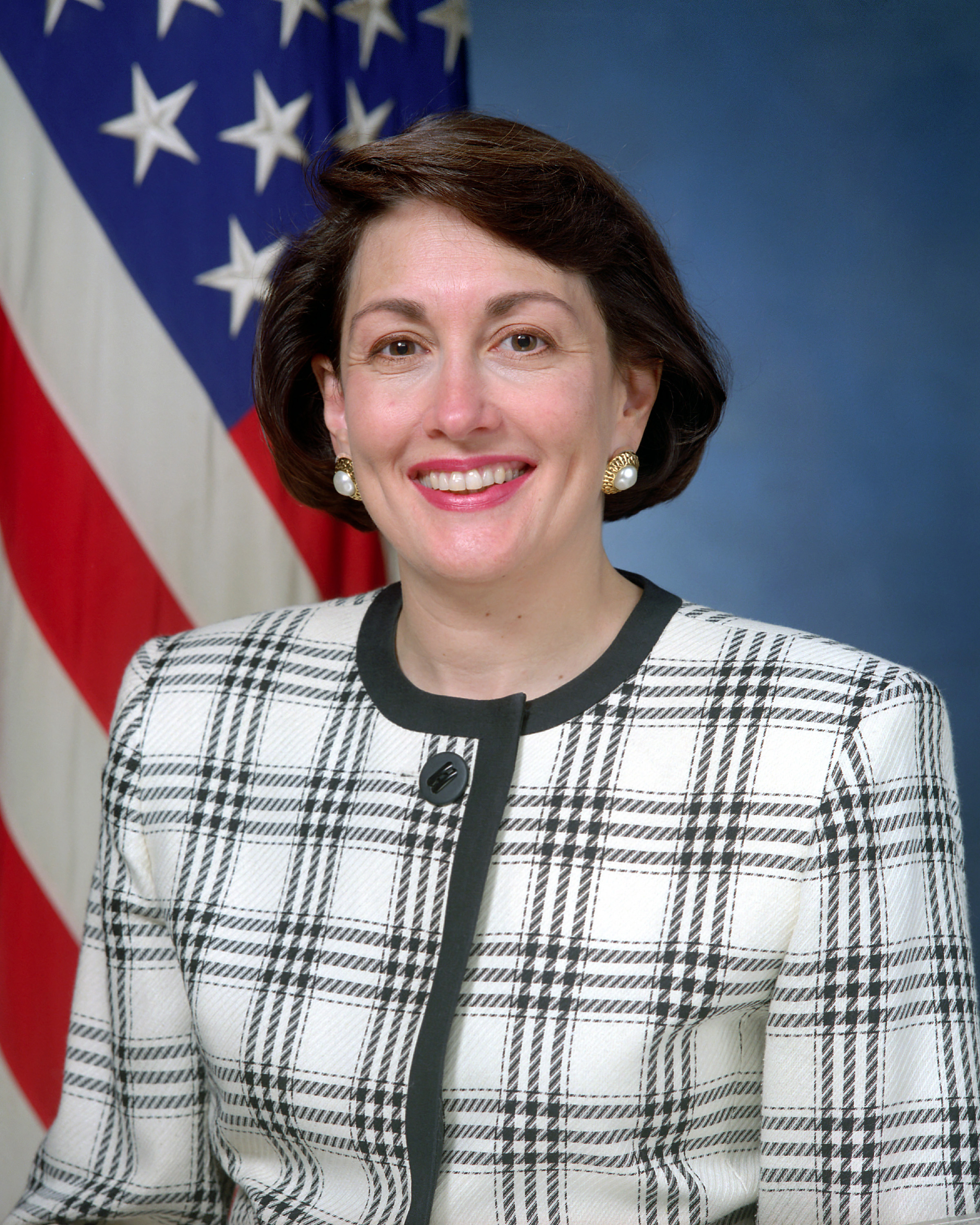
Official portrait, 1993

While serving as Deputy Attorney General under Bill Clinton, Gorelick spoke in favor of banning the use of strong encryption and called for a key escrow system to allow the Federal government access to encrypted communication.

== Private practice ==
Gorelick is a lobbyist for the lending industry fighting student loan reform. Gorelick has also represented Cardinal Health.

== Federal National Mortgage Association (Fannie Mae) ==
Gorelick was appointed Vice Chairman of Federal National Mortgage Association (Fannie Mae) from 1997 to 2003. She served alongside former Clinton Administration official Franklin Raines. During that period, Fannie Mae developed a $10 billion accounting scandal.

On March 25, 2002, Business Week interviewed Gorelick about the health of Fannie Mae. Gorelick is quoted as saying, "We believe we are managed safely. We are very pleased that Moody's gave us an A-minus in the area of bank financial strength – without a reference to the government in any way. Fannie Mae is among the handful of top-quality institutions." One year later, government regulators accused Fannie Mae of improper accounting "to the tune of $9 billion" in unrecorded losses.

In an additional scandal concerning falsified financial transactions that helped the company meet earnings targets for 1998, a "manipulation" that triggered multimillion-dollar bonuses for top executives, Gorelick received $779,625.

A 2006 report of an investigation by the Office of Federal Housing Enterprise Oversight into Fannie Mae's accounting practices and corporate governance revealed that from 1998 to 2002 Gorelick received a total of $26.5 million in income from Fannie Mae.

== 9/11 Commission ==
Gorelick's wrote in an op-ed for The Washington Post, "At last week's hearing, Attorney General John Ashcroft, facing criticism, asserted that 'the single greatest structural cause for September 11 was the wall that segregated criminal investigators and intelligence agents' and that I built that wall through a March 1995 memo." However, the report from the 9/11 Commission, co-authored by Gorelick, asserts that the 'wall' limiting the ability of federal agencies to cooperate had existed since the 1980s and is in fact not one singular wall but a series of restrictions created over the course of over twenty years.

=== Conflict of interest ===
A 1995 U.S. Department of Justice memorandum states that the procedures her memorandum put in place for the investigation of the 1993 WTC bombing "go beyond what is legally required...[to] prevent any risk of creating an unwarranted appearance that FISA is being used to avoid procedural safeguards which would apply in a criminal investigation." The wall intentionally exceeded the requirements of FISA (the Foreign Intelligence Surveillance Act of 1978) for the purposes of criminal investigations, as well as the then-existing federal case law. These rules were, shortly after their creation, expanded to regulate such communications in future counter-terrorism investigations.

Gorelick eventually recused herself from reviewing her own role in the regulation of information about terrorist activities. Attorney General Ashcroft was incensed before the 9/11 Commission to learn that the commission had not investigated or been told of Gorelick's memo or her role regarding the "wall". This assertion was disputed by former senator Slade Gorton (R-WA), a member of the 9/11 Commission, who said, "nothing Jamie Gorelick wrote had the slightest impact on the Department of Defense or its willingness or ability to share intelligence information with other intelligence agencies." Gorton also asserted that "the wall" was a long-standing policy that had resulted from the Church Committee in the 1970s, and that the policy only prohibits transfer of certain information from prosecutors to the intelligence services and never prohibited information flowing in the opposite direction.

Testifying before the commission, Attorney General John Ashcroft said, "Although you understand the debilitating impact of the wall, I cannot imagine that the commission knew about this memorandum, so I have declassified it for you and the public to review," he said. "Full disclosure compels me to inform you that its author is a member of this commission."

== Lawyer for Opioid Distributor ==
Jamie Gorelick has been accused of lobbying on behalf of the drug industry and limiting the government's ability to hold opioid distributors accountable. Gorelick's firm WilmerHale represented Cardinal Health, an opioid distributor. Since 2011, the Drug Enforcement Administration had been building a case for Cardinal Health for distributing staggering amounts of drugs to treat pain. In 2012, Cardinal Health got wind of the DEA's investigation into the company's distribution of millions of opioid drugs every month. Joseph T. Rannazzisi, the head the DEA's Office of Diversion Control at the time, believed that Gorelick's actions compromised the DEA's active investigation.

== Lawyer for Duke University ==
Gorelick was added in February 2008 to Duke University's defense team after the 2006 Duke University lacrosse case scandal. The University faced claims by unaccused members of the team that they "railroaded 47 Duke University students as either principals or accomplices." Gorelick and her law firm left the defense team in July 2011 after Judge Beatty denied Duke's motions to dismiss and let the lawsuits proceed in April.

== Lawyer for Jared Kushner ==
Gorelick represented Jared Kushner, the son-in-law of Donald Trump, as he considered a possible role in the White House. She had advised Kushner, who has sprawling financial interests in a multibillion-dollar global real estate empire, on how he might comply with federal ethics and anti-nepotism laws. She has argued that although officials leading federal agencies are barred from hiring relatives, the White House is not an agency and thus exempt. Gorelick argued that if Kushner forgoes a White House salary, he would not be bound by federal nepotism rules. Though Kushner has no experience in government or public policy, Trump directed that during his presidential transition all foreign-policy matters be relayed through Kushner. Kushner participated in meetings between Trump and foreign heads of state while continuing to run the Kushner Companies. On July 14, 2017, Gorelick stepped away from the lead role in the Russian investigation and turned over all responsibilities to Abbe Lowell. Gorelick will still work on other matters for Kushner that she was originally retained for. In September 2017 she briefly fell for fake emails originating from "email prankster" James Linton purporting to be from Kushner but didn't reveal anything confidential.

== Charitable work and community involvement ==
Gorelick has served on the boards of the John D. and Catherine T. MacArthur Foundation, the Urban Institute, the Washington Legal Clinic for the Homeless and the Carnegie Endowment for International Peace. She was elected to The American Law Institute in 1987.

== Personal ==
She is married to Richard Edward Waldhorn, a pulmonologist, and has two children.

Legal offices
Preceded by Philip Heymann	United States Deputy Attorney General; 1994–1997	Succeeded by Eric Holder
