= Washington Legal Clinic for the Homeless =

U.S. non-profit organization

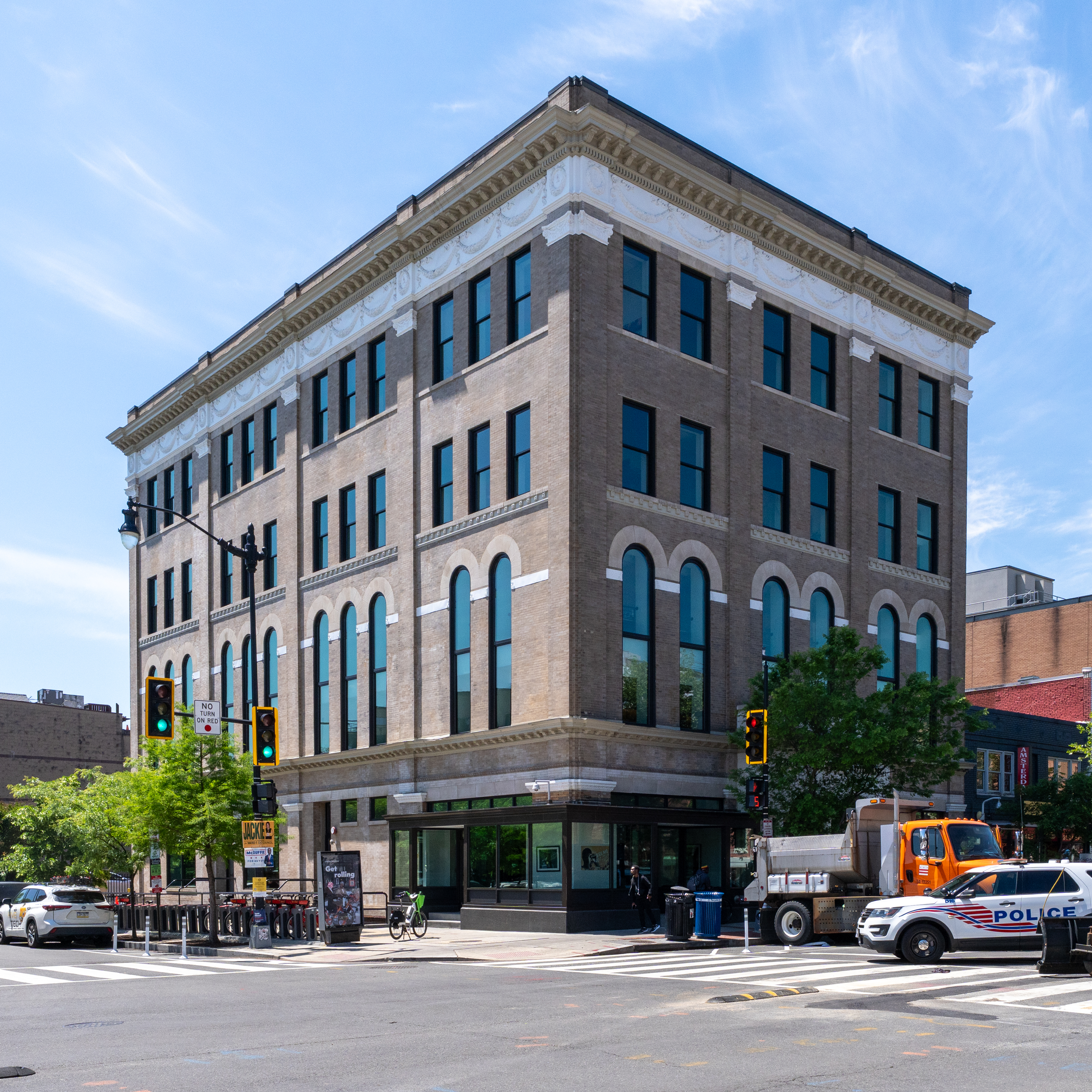
- Headquarters in the True Reformer Building
- Abbreviation: WLCH
- Formation: 1985; 41 years ago
- Type: Nonprofit organization
- Tax ID no.: 52-1545522
- Legal status: 501(c)(3)
- Purpose: To provide pro bono legal services and advocacy to people struggling with homelessness and poverty in Washington, D.C.
- Location: Washington, D.C., U.S.
- Coordinates: 38.916994°N 77.028377°W
- President: James E. Rocap, III, Esq
- Executive director: Amber Harding, Esq.
- Revenue: $2,249,963 (2019)
- Expenses: $1,919,487 (2019)
- Employees: 19 (2019)
- Volunteers: 280 (2019)
- Website: www.legalclinic.org
- Formerly called: Ad Hoc Committee for the Homeless

The Washington Legal Clinic for the Homeless (also known as WLCH or The Legal Clinic) is a Washington, D.C.–based nonprofit organization providing pro bono legal services to those in the District affected by lack of housing and other housing issues.

== History ==
The Washington Legal Clinic for the Homeless began its efforts to fight homelessness in 1985 as an undertaking of the D.C. Bar, and was originally titled "Ad Hoc Committee for the Homeless." In 1986, the organization became the Washington Legal Clinic for the Homeless. It was incorporated on May 14, 1987.

Mary Ann Luby, a nun, served as outreach worker at the Washington Legal Clinic for the Homeless for 15 years. Prior to joining the Clinic, she served as the first director of the privately run Rachael's Women's Center. She died in 2010 at the age of 70.
