= United States Deputy Attorney General =

Deputy head of the US Department of Justice

- Seal of the Department of Justice

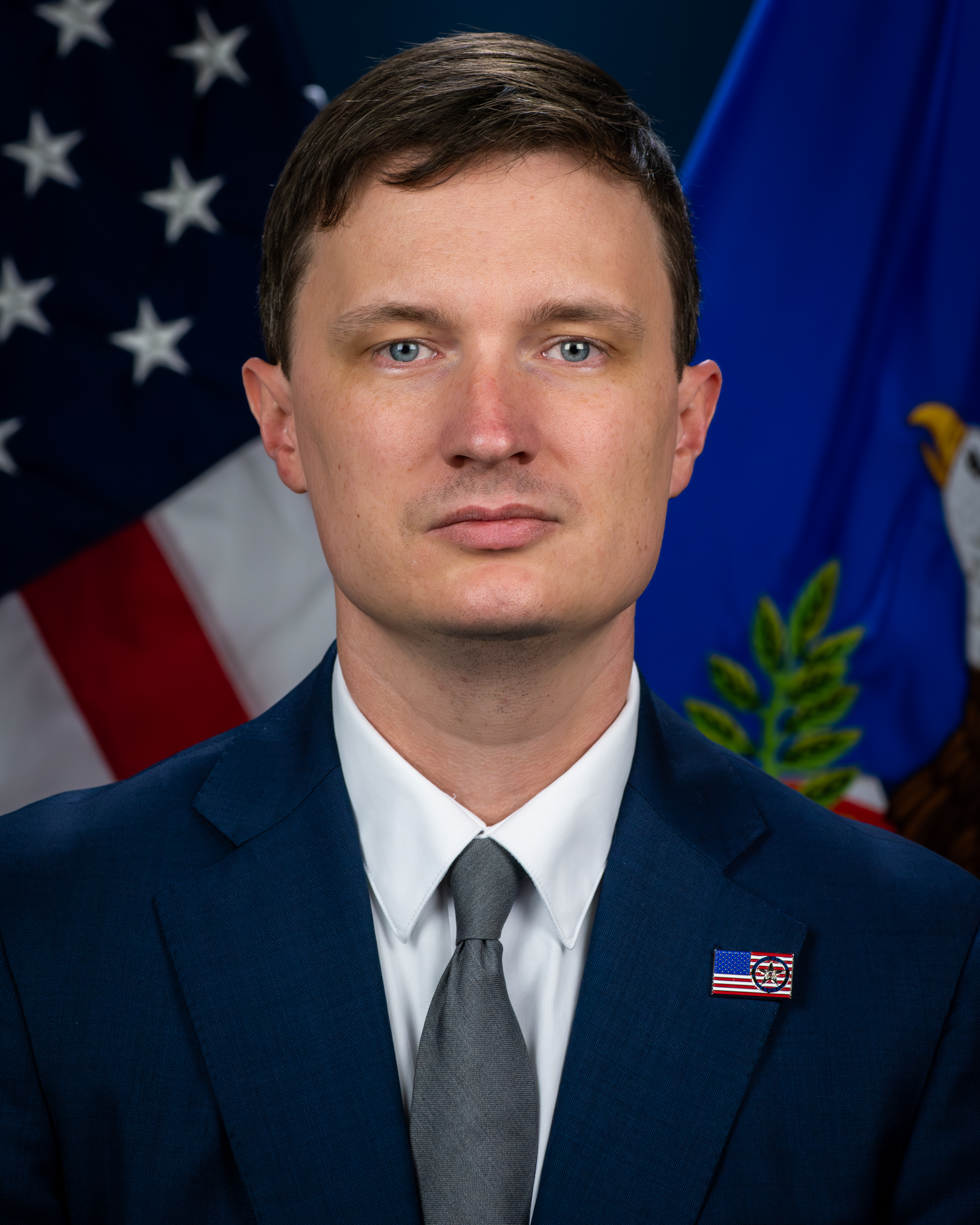
- Incumbent; Trent McCotter; Acting since August 10, 2026
- United States Department of Justice
- Style: Mr. Deputy Attorney General
- Reports to: United States Attorney General
- Seat: Department of Justice Headquarters, Washington, D.C.
- Appointer: The president; with Senate advice and consent
- Constituting instrument: 28 U.S.C. § 504
- Formation: May 24, 1950
- First holder: Peyton Ford
- Salary: Executive Schedule, Level II
- Website: www.justice.gov/dag

The United States deputy attorney general is the second-highest-ranking official in the United States Department of Justice and oversees the day-to-day operation of the department. The deputy attorney general acts as attorney general during the absence of the attorney general.

The deputy attorney general is a political appointee of the president of the United States and takes office after confirmation by the United States Senate. The position was created in 1950.

== List of United States deputy attorneys general ==
#	Image	Name	Term began	Term ended	President(s) served under
1		Peyton Ford	May 24, 1950	1951	Harry S. Truman
2		A. Devitt Vanech	1951	1952	Harry S. Truman
3		Ross L. Malone	1952	January 20, 1953	Harry S. Truman
4		William P. Rogers	January 20, 1953	October 23, 1957	Dwight D. Eisenhower
5		Lawrence Walsh	December 29, 1957	January 20, 1961	Dwight D. Eisenhower
6		Byron White	January 20, 1961	April 16, 1962	John F. Kennedy
7		Nicholas Katzenbach	April 16, 1962	January 28, 1965	John F. Kennedy
7		Nicholas Katzenbach	April 16, 1962	January 28, 1965	John F. Kennedy; Lyndon B. Johnson
8		Ramsey Clark	January 28, 1965	March 10, 1967	Lyndon B. Johnson
9		Warren Christopher	March 10, 1967	January 20, 1969	Lyndon B. Johnson
10		Richard Kleindienst	January 20, 1969	June 12, 1972	Richard Nixon
11		Ralph E. Erickson	June 1972	February 1973	Richard Nixon
12		Joseph Tyree Sneed III	February 1973	July 9, 1973	Richard Nixon
13		William Ruckelshaus	July 9, 1973	October 20, 1973	Richard Nixon
14		Laurence Silberman	January 20, 1974	April 6, 1975	Richard Nixon; Gerald Ford
15		Harold R. Tyler Jr.	April 6, 1975	January 20, 1977	Gerald Ford
Acting		Dick Thornburgh	January 20, 1977	March 12, 1977	Jimmy Carter
16		Peter F. Flaherty	April 12, 1977	December 9, 1977	Jimmy Carter
17		Benjamin Civiletti	May 16, 1978	August 16, 1979	Jimmy Carter
Acting		Charles Ruff	August 16, 1979	February 27, 1980	Jimmy Carter
18		Charles Byron Renfrew	February 27, 1980	January 19, 1981	Jimmy Carter
19		Edward C. Schmults	February 1981	February 3, 1984	Ronald Reagan
20		Carol E. Dinkins	May 23, 1984	April 1985	Ronald Reagan
21		D. Lowell Jensen	May 1985	June 25, 1986	Ronald Reagan
22		Arnold Burns	July 1986	July 1988	Ronald Reagan
23		Harold G. Christensen	July 1988	May 22, 1989	Ronald Reagan
24		Donald B. Ayer	November 1989	May 11, 1990	George H. W. Bush
25		William Barr	May 26, 1990	November 26, 1991	George H. W. Bush
26		George J. Terwilliger III	November 26, 1991	January 20, 1993	George H. W. Bush
27		Philip Heymann	May 28, 1993	March 17, 1994	Bill Clinton
28		Jamie Gorelick	March 17, 1994	May 1997	Bill Clinton
29		Eric Holder	June 13, 1997	January 20, 2001	Bill Clinton
Acting		Robert Mueller	January 20, 2001	May 10, 2001	George W. Bush
30		Larry Thompson	May 10, 2001	August 31, 2003	George W. Bush
31		James Comey	November 9, 2003	August 15, 2005	George W. Bush
Acting		Robert McCallum Jr.	August 15, 2005	March 17, 2006	George W. Bush
32		Paul McNulty	March 17, 2006	July 26, 2007	George W. Bush
Acting		Craig S. Morford	July 26, 2007	March 10, 2008	George W. Bush
33		Mark Filip	March 10, 2008	January 20, 2009	George W. Bush
34		David W. Ogden	March 12, 2009	February 5, 2010	Barack Obama
Acting		Gary Grindler	February 5, 2010	December 29, 2010	Barack Obama
35		James M. Cole	December 29, 2010	January 8, 2015	Barack Obama
36		Sally Yates	January 10, 2015	May 13, 2015	Barack Obama
36		Sally Yates	May 13, 2015	January 30, 2017	Barack Obama; Donald Trump
Acting		Dana Boente	February 9, 2017	April 26, 2017	Donald Trump
37		Rod Rosenstein	April 26, 2017	May 11, 2019	Donald Trump
Acting		Ed O'Callaghan	May 13, 2019	May 22, 2019	Donald Trump
38		Jeffrey A. Rosen	May 22, 2019	December 23, 2020	Donald Trump
Acting		Richard Donoghue	December 24, 2020	January 20, 2021	Donald Trump
Acting		John P. Carlin	January 20, 2021	April 21, 2021	Joe Biden
39		Lisa Monaco	April 21, 2021	January 20, 2025	Joe Biden
Acting		Emil Bove	January 20, 2025	March 6, 2025	Donald Trump
40		Todd Blanche	March 6, 2025	August 10, 2026	Donald Trump
Acting		Trent McCotter	August 10, 2026	Incumbent	Donald Trump
