= William Amory Underhill =

American lawyer & official in Truman presidency

William Amory Underhill (February 21, 1910 – September 7, 1999) was a public servant, lobbyist, and philanthropist prominent in his native Florida and in Washington, D.C.

After graduating from Stetson University in DeLand, Florida in 1936 with a bachelor's degree in law (LLB), Underhill worked as a local attorney in DeLand until the outbreak of World War II. During World War II, Underhill served as a Lieutenant Commander in the U.S. Navy, shepherding prisoners of war across the Atlantic, until 1944 when he was assigned to then-Senator Harry S. Truman, who was campaigning for the Vice Presidency.

After Truman assumed the Presidency, and following the end of the war in 1945, Truman named Underhill to lead the National Young Democrats. Following a year in that post, Underhill joined the U.S. Justice Department, working his way up to Assistant Attorney General for the Lands Division.

In 1952, Underhill left the Justice Department to work as an attorney and lobbyist, particularly for Florida citrus concerns. In that capacity until his death, Underhill represented citrus growers on numerous issues, including the 1993 North American Free Trade Agreement (NAFTA).

In later years, Underhill was well known for his support of numerous charitable causes, including his alma mater Stetson University, St. Leo College, and Florida House in Washington, D.C. Having divided his time between DeLand, Florida and Washington, D.C. for decades, Underhill died at his DeLand home on September 7, 1999 of natural causes.

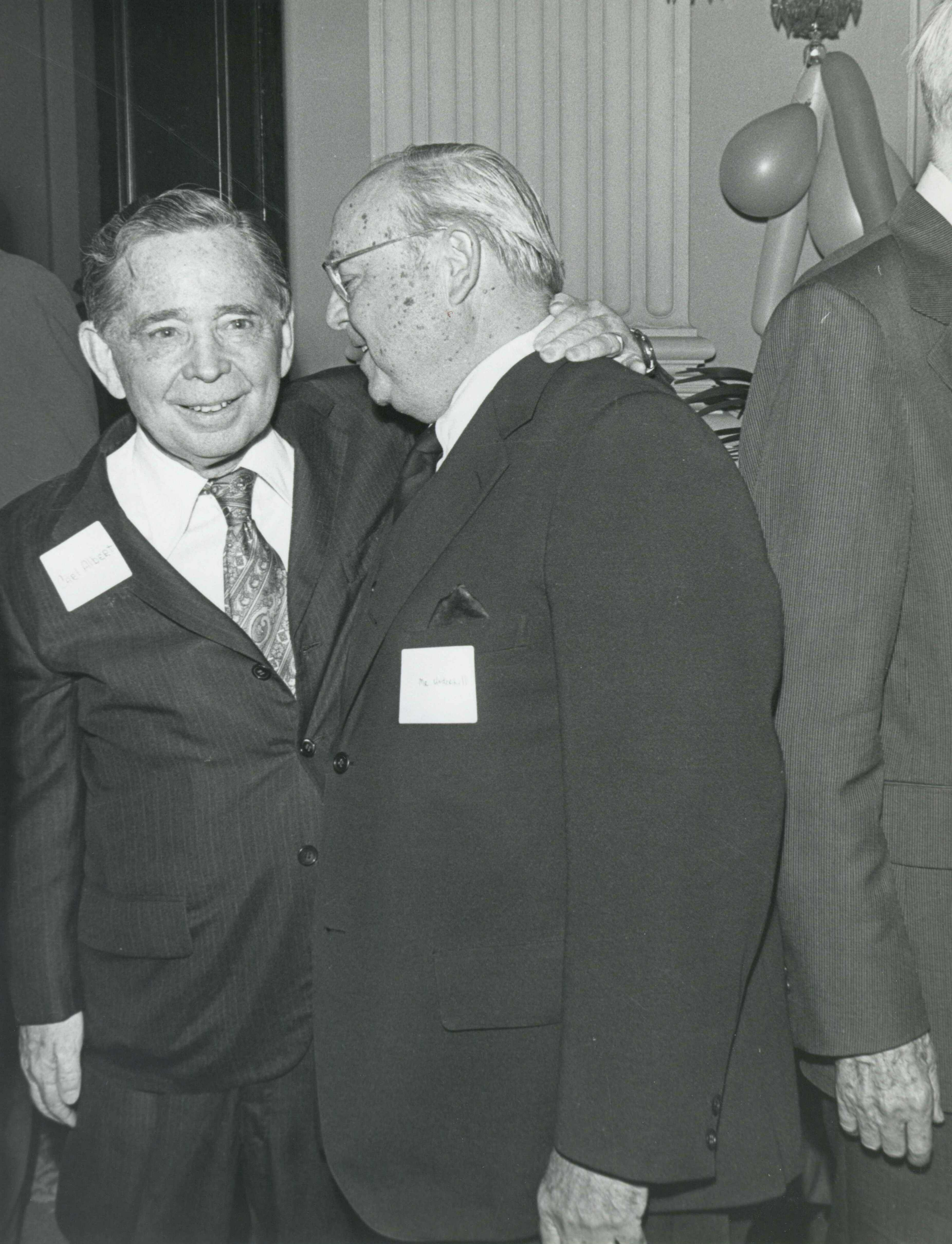
Photograph of William Amory Underhill (center right) with then U.S. House Speaker Carl Albert (on left) in 1976. Courtesy of Carl Albert Center, University of Oklahoma.
