= A. Devitt Vanech =

American attorney (1906–1967)

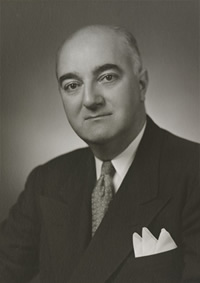

2nd United States Deputy Attorney General
- In office 1951–1952
- President: Harry S. Truman
- Preceded by: Peyton Ford
- Succeeded by: Ross L. Malone

13th United States Assistant Attorney General for the Environment and Natural Resources
- In office 1947–1951
- President: Harry S. Truman
- Preceded by: David L. Bazelon
- Succeeded by: William Amory Underhill

Personal details
- Born: Augustus Devitt Vanech; March 26, 1906 New York City, U.S.
- Died: September 10, 1967 (aged 61) Washington, D.C., U.S.
- Party: Democratic

A. Devitt Vanech (March 26, 1906 – September 10, 1967) was an American attorney who served as the United States Assistant Attorney General for the Environment and Natural Resources from 1947 to 1951 and as United States Deputy Attorney General from 1951 to 1952.
