= Larry Thompson (lawyer) =

American lawyer (born 1945)

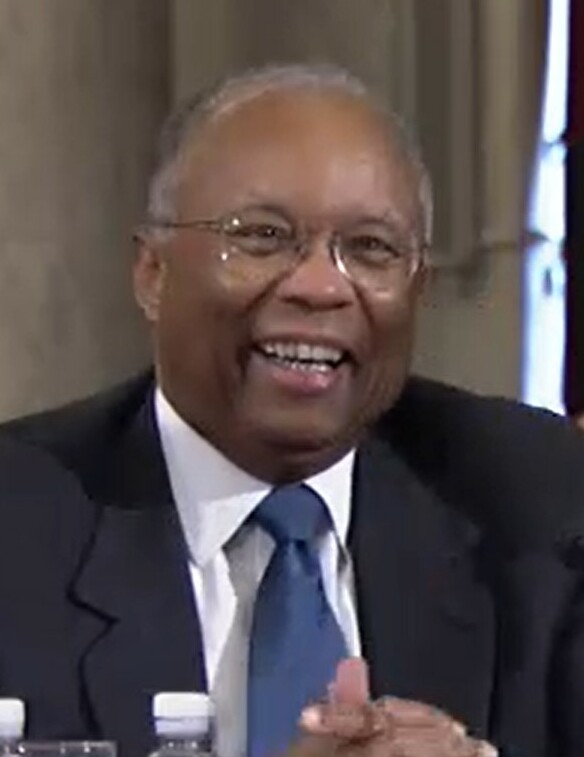

30th United States Deputy Attorney General
- In office May 10, 2001 – August 31, 2003
- President: George W. Bush
- Preceded by: Robert Mueller (Acting)
- Succeeded by: James Comey

United States Attorney for the Northern District of Georgia
- In office 1982–1986
- President: Ronald Reagan
- Preceded by: William Harper
- Succeeded by: Bob Barr

Personal details
- Born: Larry Dean Thompson; November 15, 1945 (age 81) Hannibal, Missouri, U.S.
- Party: Republican
- Education: Culver-Stockton College (BA); Michigan State University (MA); University of Michigan (JD)

Larry Dean Thompson (born November 15, 1945) is an American lawyer and law professor, who served as Deputy Attorney General of the United States under United States President George W. Bush until August 2003.

== Early life and education ==
Thompson, the son of a railroad laborer, was born and raised in Hannibal, Missouri. He received his bachelor's degree, graduating cum laude, from Culver-Stockton College in 1967, his master's degree from Michigan State University in 1969, and his Juris Doctor (J.D.) from the University of Michigan in 1974.

In 1970, Thompson married Brenda Anne Taggart. They have two sons.

== Corporate career ==
Thompson worked as an industrial relations representative for Ford Motor Company during law school. After graduation he worked as an attorney for Monsanto Company in St. Louis until 1977. That year he joined the law firm of King & Spalding in Atlanta, Georgia. He left the firm in 1982 for four years with the Justice Department as United States Attorney for the Northern District of Georgia, then returned and was made a partner in 1986. In 1991, as a member of the legal team for Clarence Thomas, Thompson "was among those who devised a strategy to portray Judge Thomas's accuser, Anita F. Hill, as suffering from erotomania." He left King & Spalding in 2001 to go back to the Justice Department as Deputy Attorney General.

== U.S. government service ==
From 1982 to 1986, he served as U.S. Attorney for the Northern District of Georgia, and led the Southeastern Organized Crime Drug Enforcement Task Force. The New York Times describes him as "a moderate" who is "respected by both Democrats and Republicans."

=== Independent Counsel ===
Thompson served as Independent Counsel for the Department of Housing and Urban Development Investigation from 1995 to 1998, completing an investigation and prosecution started by Judge Arlin Adams in 1990.

=== Deputy U.S. Attorney General ===
In 2001, Thompson was appointed as Deputy U.S. Attorney General by President Bush. At the time of his appointment he was a member of the Federalist Society.

==== Thompson Memorandum ====
In January 2003 Thompson issued an internal Justice Department document informally titled the Thompson Memorandum written to help federal prosecutors decide whether to charge a corporation, rather than or in addition to individuals within the corporation, with criminal offenses. The guidelines were considered tough because they require that to claim cooperation, companies must (1) turn over materials from internal investigations, (2) waive attorney–client privilege, and (3) not provide targeted executive with company-paid lawyers. The guidelines were criticized for, among other things, "seriously eroding" attorney-client privilege. These guidelines were "eased" in December 2006 by Deputy Attorney General Paul J. McNulty who issued a revised version of the memorandum.

== Career after Department of Justice ==
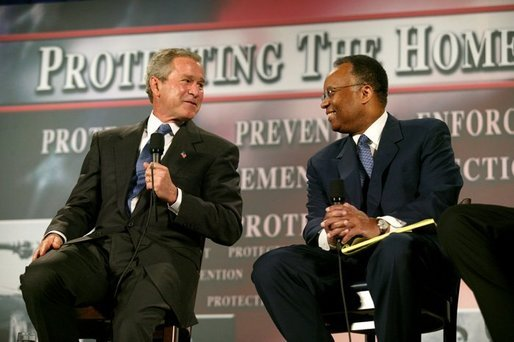
Thompson with President George W. Bush in April 2004

In August 2003 Thompson left the Justice Department and was a senior fellow at the Brookings Institution for a year before accepting the position of senior vice-president for government affairs and general counsel at PepsiCo in Purchase, New York. Since 2011, he has served as the John A. Sibley Professor in Corporate and Business Law at the University of Georgia School of Law, where he teaches corporate responsibility and white collar criminal law, and serves on the school’s Dean Rusk International Law Center Council.

Thompson was named in the press as a leading candidate for Attorney General after John Ashcroft resigned on November 9, 2004. Thompson, if selected, would have been the first African-American ever to head the Justice Department. Instead, Alberto Gonzales was selected as Ashcroft's replacement. Later, Thompson's name was mentioned as a possible candidate to replace Supreme Court Justice Sandra Day O'Connor. With the resignation of Gonzales in August 2007, Thompson's name again surfaced a candidate for Attorney General. He supported former New York Mayor Rudy Giuliani in the 2008 presidential election, and the American Bar Association mentioned Thompson again as a possible Attorney General or Supreme Court justice during a potential John McCain administration.

Thompson was named independent corporate monitor overseeing compliance reforms at Volkswagen AG for the next three years by the U.S. government on April 21, 2017.

Thompson and his wife Brenda are noted collectors of art by African American artists. In 2012 they donated works of art to the Georgia Museum of Art and endowed a curatorial chair there. An exhibition of the works occurred at the Museum in 2017.

Thompson has been a member of the Board of Curators for the Georgia Historical Society since 2020.

== See also ==
- George W. Bush Supreme Court candidates

Legal offices
| Preceded by Robert Mueller; Acting | United States Deputy Attorney General; 2001–2003 | Succeeded by James Comey |
