= Robert McCallum Jr. =

American lawyer and diplomat

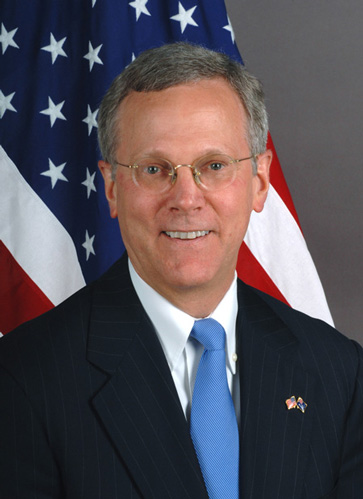

23rd United States Ambassador to Australia
- In office August 24, 2006 – January 20, 2009
- President: George W. Bush
- Preceded by: Thomas Schieffer
- Succeeded by: Jeff Bleich

United States Deputy Attorney General
- Acting
- In office August 15, 2005 – March 17, 2006
- President: George W. Bush
- Preceded by: James Comey
- Succeeded by: Paul McNulty

14th United States Associate Attorney General
- In office June 27, 2003 – March 17, 2006
- President: George W. Bush
- Attorney General: John Ashcroft; Alberto Gonzales
- Preceded by: Jay B. Stephens
- Succeeded by: Kevin J. O'Connor

United States Assistant Attorney General for the Civil Division
- In office September 17, 2001 – 2003
- President: George W. Bush
- Attorney General: John Ashcroft
- Preceded by: David W. Ogden
- Succeeded by: Peter Keisler

Personal details
- Born: Robert Davis McCallum Jr. Memphis, Tennessee, U.S.
- Died: April 16, 2026 (aged 80) Memphis, Tennessee, U.S.
- Party: Republican
- Spouse: Mary Rankin Weems (m. 1969)
- Children: 2
- Parent: Robert D.
- Education: Yale University (BA, JD); Christ Church, Oxford (BA)

Robert Davis McCallum Jr. (January 30, 1946 – April 16, 2026) was an American lawyer and diplomat who served in the Bush administration. He was the Associate Attorney General of the United States from 2003 to 2006, also acting as the Deputy Attorney General from 2005 to 2006. He was appointed as the United States Ambassador to Australia in 2006, a capacity in which he served until the end of Bush's term in 2009.

== Early life and education ==
McCallum was born in Memphis, Tennessee, where his father, Robert D. McCallum, was a businessman. He was educated at Presbyterian Day School in Memphis and then at The Choate School (now Choate Rosemary Hall) in Wallingford, Connecticut, where he was a star tennis player and captain of the basketball team. He then went to Yale University, where he was captain of the Yale Bulldogs men's basketball team in his senior year, he graduated in 1968. At Yale his roommate and fellow member of Skull and Bones was George W. Bush. In 1968, McCallum was named a Rhodes Scholar and attended Christ Church, Oxford in England. He earned a Bachelor of Arts in Jurisprudence with First Class Honors in 1971. While at Oxford, McCallum was a member of the Oxford University men's basketball team that reached the final of the Amateur Basketball Association (A.B.B.A) National Championship. In 1969, he married Mary Rankin Weems ("Mimi") of Memphis. They had two adult sons, one of whom was also a Rhodes Scholar. McCallum graduated from Yale Law School in 1973.

== Professional life ==
After completing his Juris Doctor at Yale in 1973, McCallum joined the Atlanta law firm of Alston & Bird. Philip Alston, one of the principals of this firm, was U.S. Ambassador to Australia under President Jimmy Carter from 1977 to 1981. McCallum remained with the firm for 28 years, before joining the U.S. Department of Justice in 2001 as Assistant Attorney General for the Civil Division. In this position, he oversaw litigation involving the defense of challenges to presidential actions and acts of Congress; national security issues; immigration; benefit programs; commercial issues including health care fraud, banking, insurance, patents, debt collection; and the Food Drug and Cosmetic Act.

In July 2003 McCallum was appointed Associate Attorney General. He served as Acting Deputy Attorney General from September to December 2004 and from August 2005 until he resigned on being nominated as Ambassador to Australia.

In 2005 McCallum, who had been a partner at the Atlanta law firm Alston & Bird that did legal work for R.J. Reynolds Tobacco, was accused of interfering with the government's prosecution of the tobacco industry by requiring Justice Department lawyers to cut their demand for an industry-sponsored smoking cessation program from $130 billion to $10 billion. One prosecution witness, Matthew Myers, said he was told by Justice lawyers that McCallum wanted him to remove part of his testimony. Harvard business professor Max Bazerman then told the press McCallum sent word he would be prohibited from testifying if he did not alter his testimony; Bazerman refused to do so but to his surprise was still allowed to testify. During his ambassadorial confirmation hearings before the United States Senate, Senator Dick Durbin of Illinois raised this issue and demanded an investigation of McCallum's role. The Justice Department's Office of Professional Responsibility found no wrongdoing on McCallum's part. In her 2006 decision in the case, Judge Gladys Kessler placed limits on tobacco companies' abilities to market cigarettes, but found that a previous appeals court ruling prevented her (in the judicial branch) from requiring the industry to pay for a smoking cessation program.

== Australia ==
McCallum had never been to Australia prior to his appointment and had had no previous involvement with the country, or indeed with foreign policy at all. The position of U.S. Ambassador to Australia is traditionally held by friends or political associates of the President, rather than by career diplomats, since Australia is a close ally of the U.S. and the post is considered a highly desirable one. The previous Ambassador, Tom Schieffer, was a business associate of President Bush.

In an interview with The Australian, a national daily newspaper, McCallum said that he had been attending seminars on Australian affairs since his appointment. "I feel that [from the seminars] I have got a good grounding in the fundamentals of what is going on in a very, very important relationship to the U.S. with Australia, and I'm eager to learn and experience that firsthand", he said. He said that he would seek to meet and establish close relations with Australian politicians of all parties, including those critical of U.S. policies.

McCallum's arrival in Australia ended an 18-month period in which there was no U.S. Ambassador in Canberra. Following Schieffer's departure to take up the position of Ambassador to Japan in January 2005, the U.S. was represented by a Chargé d'Affaires, Bill Stanton, who also departed Australia before McCallum's appointment. The long delay was caused by the Bush administration's apparent inability to find a candidate who was suitably close to the President but willing to undergo the scrutiny which accompanies the Senate confirmation process.

McCallum announced that he would resign his position following the inauguration of President Barack Obama in 2009, to make way for the next U.S. ambassador to Australia and—as he was not close with Senators McCain or Obama—iterated his view that it is important for a US-Australia ambassador have a close relationship with the President. He resigned from the position and left Australia on 20 January 2009.

== See also ==
- List of United States ambassadors to Australia

Legal offices
Preceded by David W. Ogden	United States Assistant Attorney General for the Civil Division; 2001–2003	Succeeded by Peter D. Keisler
Preceded by Peter D. Keisler; Acting	United States Associate Attorney General; 2003–2006	Succeeded by William W. Mercer; Acting
Preceded by James Comey	United States Deputy Attorney General; Acting; August 15, 2005 – March 17, 2006	Succeeded by Paul McNulty
Diplomatic posts
Preceded by Tom Schieffer	United States Ambassador to Australia; 2006–2009	Succeeded by Jeffrey L. Bleich
