= William Baer =

William Baer may refer to:

- William Baer (writer) (born 1948), American poet and professor
- William Baer (lawyer) (born 1950), American antitrust lawyer and official in the U.S. Department of Justice
- William Jacob Baer (1860–1941), American painter
