= Jody Hunt =

American lawyer (born 1961)

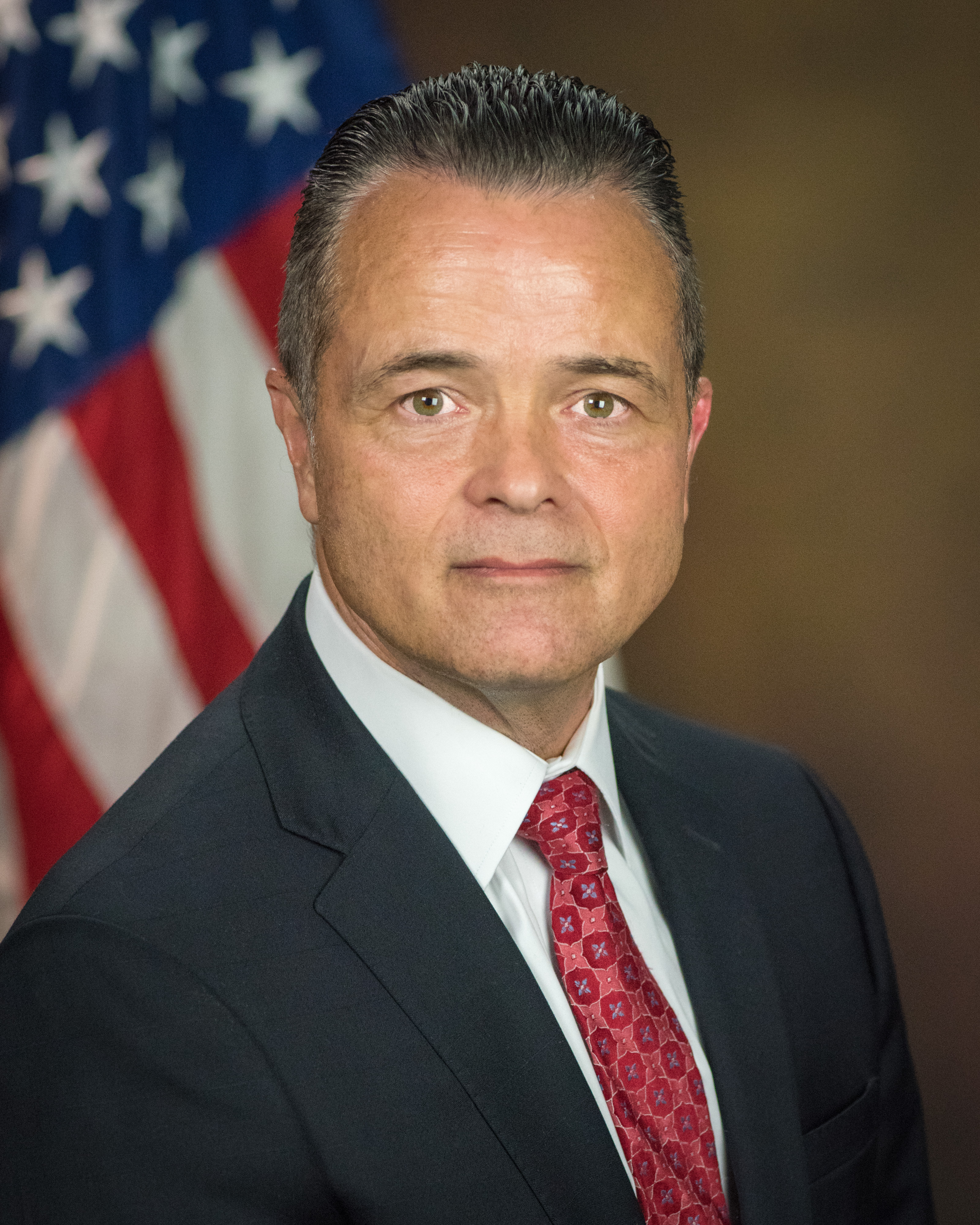

United States Assistant Attorney General for the Civil Division
- In office September 4, 2018 – July 3, 2020
- President: Donald Trump
- Preceded by: Stuart Delery
- Succeeded by: Brett A. Shumate (2025)

Personal details
- Born: Joseph Harold Hunt; September 30, 1961 (age 64) Tupelo, Mississippi, U.S.
- Education: Samford University (BA); Florida State University (MA); Columbia University (JD)

Joseph Harold Hunt (born September 30, 1961) is an American lawyer. He was the United States Assistant Attorney General for the Civil Division of the Department of Justice from September 2018 to July 2020.

== Education ==
Hunt received his Bachelor of Arts from Samford University in 1982, where he was the valedictorian. He earned a Master of Arts from Florida State University in 1984, and a Juris Doctor from Columbia Law School in 1989, where he was recognized as Best Oralist in the national phase of the Philip C. Jessup International Law Moot Court Competition.

== Career ==
After graduating from law school, Hunt clerked for Judge James Hughes Hancock of the United States District Court for the Northern District of Alabama.

=== Private practice ===
After clerking, Hunt worked for five years at White & Case as an associate, and four years at King & Spalding, where he became a partner.

=== U.S. Department of Justice ===
In 1999, Hunt joined the United States Department of Justice Civil Division's Federal Programs branch, where he was a trial attorney until 2002. From 2001 to 2002, Hunt was detailed to the Office of the United States Deputy Attorney General. In 2002, Hunt became Director of the Federal Programs Branch.

After Jeff Sessions became United States Attorney General in February 2017, Hunt served as his chief of staff until October of that year. Hunt became a senior advisor to the Office of Legal Policy in October 2017, in which capacity he remained September 2018.

=== Assistant Attorney General ===
On September 14, 2017, President Donald Trump announced his intent to nominate Hunt to become the United States Assistant Attorney General for the Civil Division. Hunt's nomination was sent to the Senate on December 11, 2017.

The nomination was not acted upon, so on January 3, 2018, it was returned to the President under Rule XXXI, Paragraph 6 of the United States Senate. Hunt was renominated on January 8, 2018, and had a confirmation hearing on March 7, 2018, before the Senate Judiciary Committee. On April 19, 2018, Hunt's nomination was reported out of committee by an 18–3 vote. On August 28, 2018, the Senate voted to confirm him to head the Civil Division by a vote of 72–23. Hunt was sworn in on September 4, 2018. He oversaw the legal defense of Trump administration policies, as well as the general refusal to respond to Congressional oversight authority. Hunt declared that he would leave his position in early July 2020.

=== Samford University ===
On March 1, 2023, Hunt became general counsel of his alma mater, Samford University, in Birmingham, Alabama. He succeeded Clark Watson in the post.

Legal offices
Preceded by Chad Readler; Acting	United States Assistant Attorney General for the Civil Division; 2018–2020	Succeeded by Ethan Davis; Acting
