= United States Associate Attorney General =

Senior official in the US Department of Justice

- Seal of the department

- Flag of the associate attorney general

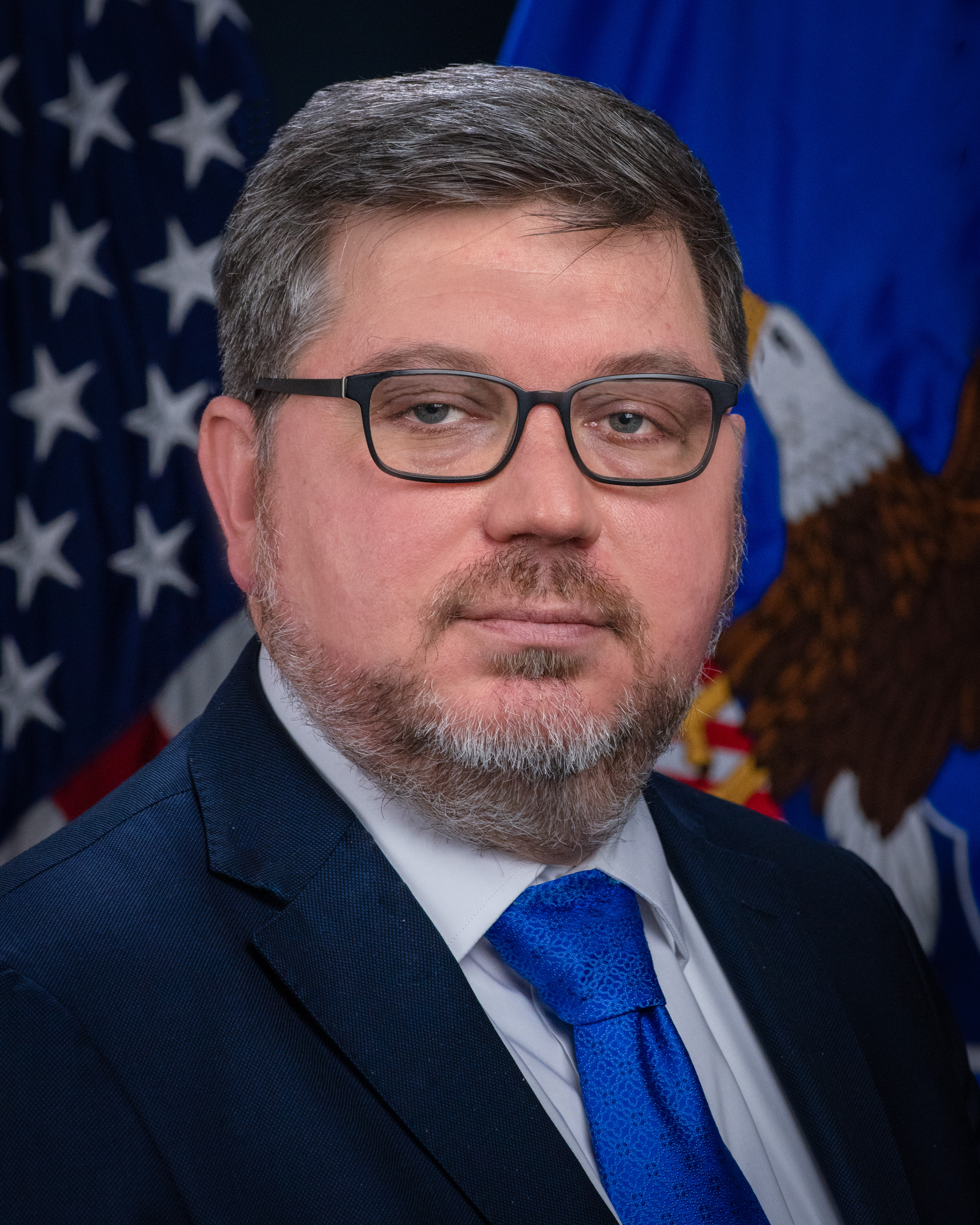
- Incumbent; Stanley Woodward since November 14, 2025
- United States Department of Justice
- Reports to: Attorney General
- Appointer: The president; with Senate advice and consent
- Term length: No fixed term
- Constituting instrument: 28 U.S.C. § 504a
- Formation: March 10, 1977
- First holder: Michael J. Egan
- Website: www.justice.gov/asg

The United States associate attorney general is the third-highest-ranking official in the United States Department of Justice (DOJ). The associate attorney general advises and assists the attorney general and the deputy attorney general in policies relating to civil justice, federal and local law enforcement, and public safety matters. The associate attorney general is appointed by the president and confirmed by the Senate.

The Office of the Associate Attorney General oversees the Antitrust Division, the Civil Division, the Environment and Natural Resources Division, the Tax Division, the Office of Justice Programs, the Community Oriented Policing Services, the Community Relations Service, the Office of Dispute Resolution, the Office of Violence Against Women, the Office of Information and Privacy, the Executive Office for United States Trustees, and the Foreign Claims Settlement Commission.

The Office of the Associate Attorney General was created on March 10, 1977, by Attorney General Order No. 699-77.

== List of United States associate attorneys general ==
No.	Portrait	Name	Years in office	President
^{*} Acting Associate Attorney General
1		Michael J. Egan	1977–1979	Jimmy Carter
2		John H. Shenefield	1979–1981	Jimmy Carter
3		Rudolph W. Giuliani	1981–1983	Ronald Reagan
4		D. Lowell Jensen	1983–1985	Ronald Reagan
5		Arnold I. Burns	1985–1986	Ronald Reagan
6		Stephen S. Trott	1986–1988	Ronald Reagan
7		Frank Keating	1988–1990	George H. W. Bush
Vacant			1990–1992	George H. W. Bush
8		Wayne Budd	1992–1993	George H. W. Bush
9		Webster Hubbell	1993–1994	Bill Clinton
10		John Schmidt	1994–1997	Bill Clinton
11		Raymond C. Fisher	1997–1999	Bill Clinton
12		Daniel Marcus	1999–2001	Bill Clinton
13		Jay B. Stephens	2001–2002	George W. Bush
–		Peter Keisler ^{*}	2002–2003	George W. Bush
14		Robert McCallum Jr.	2003–2006	George W. Bush
–		William W. Mercer ^{*}	2006–2007	George W. Bush
–		Gregory G. Katsas ^{*}	2007–2008	George W. Bush
15		Kevin J. O'Connor	2008–2009	George W. Bush
16		Thomas J. Perrelli	2009–2012	Barack Obama
17		Tony West	2012–2014	Barack Obama
–		Stuart F. Delery ^{*}	2014–2016	Barack Obama
–		William J. Baer ^{*}	2016–2017	Barack Obama
–		Jesse Panuccio ^{*}	2017	Donald Trump
18		Rachel Brand	2017–2018	Donald Trump
–		Jesse Panuccio ^{*}	2018–2019	Donald Trump
–		Claire McCusker Murray^{*}	2019–2021	Donald Trump
–		Matthew Colangelo^{*}	2021	Joe Biden
19		Vanita Gupta	2021–2024	Joe Biden
–		Benjamin C. Mizer^{*}	2024–2025	Joe Biden
20		Stanley Woodward	2025–	Donald Trump
