= Tom Schieffer =

American diplomat and entrepreneur (born 1947)

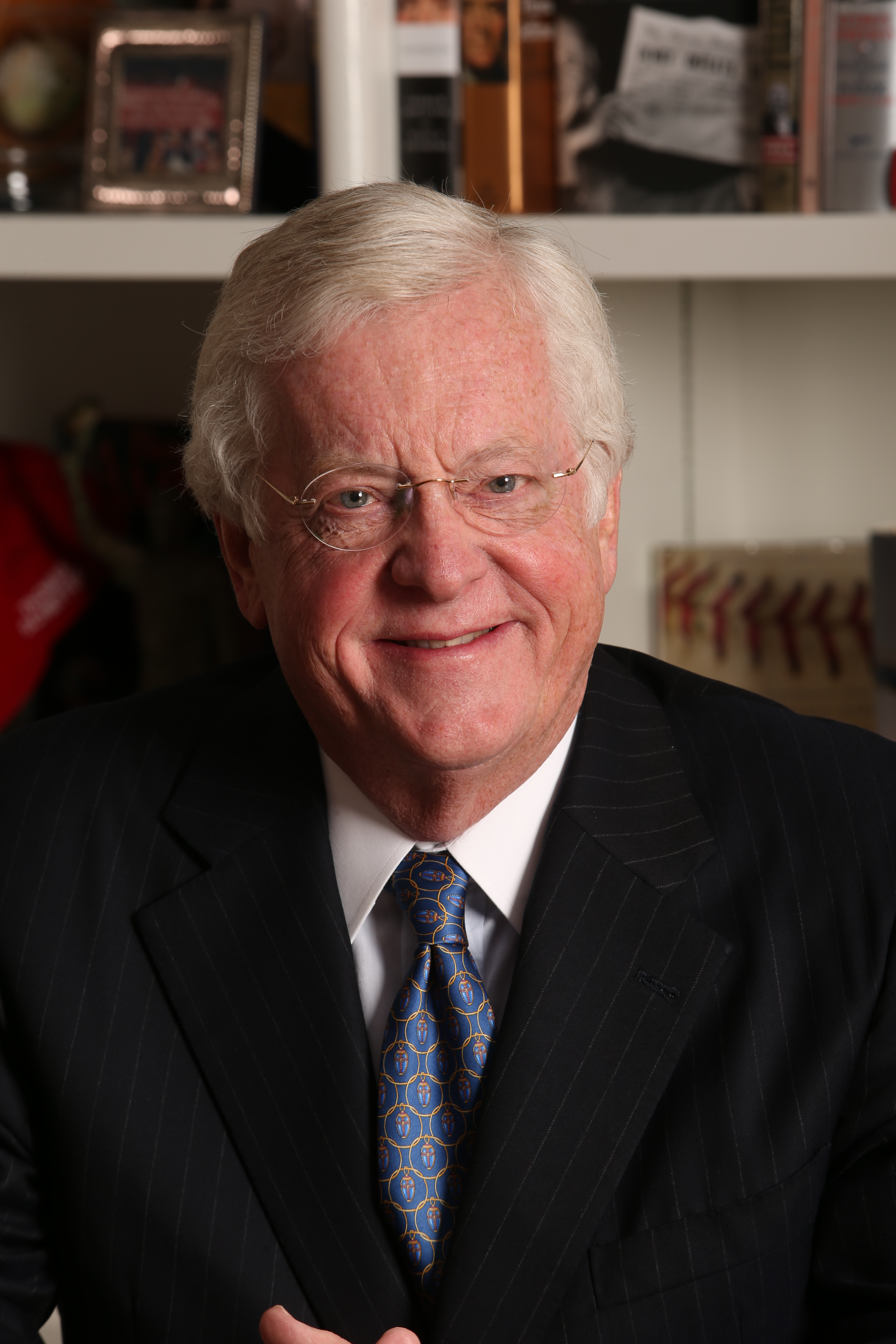

27th United States Ambassador to Japan
- In office April 11, 2005 – January 20, 2009
- President: George W. Bush
- Preceded by: Howard Baker
- Succeeded by: John Roos

22nd United States Ambassador to Australia
- In office August 23, 2001 – February 18, 2005
- President: George W. Bush
- Preceded by: Edward Gnehm
- Succeeded by: Robert McCallum Jr.

Member of the Texas House of Representatives from the 32nd district
- In office January 9, 1973 – January 9, 1979
- Preceded by: District Created
- Succeeded by: Bob Ware

Personal details
- Born: John Thomas Schieffer; October 4, 1947 (age 79) Fort Worth, Texas, U.S.
- Party: Democratic
- Spouse: Susanne Silber
- Relations: Bob Schieffer (brother)
- Children: 1
- Parent(s): John E. Gladys (nee Payne)
- Education: University of Texas at Austin (BA)

John Thomas Schieffer (born October 4, 1947) is an American diplomat and entrepreneur who served as U.S. Ambassador to Australia from 2001 to 2005 and as U.S. Ambassador to Japan from 2005 to 2009.

Schieffer is the founder and President of Envoy International, a consulting firm that provides a wide range of services to clients with international interest. Schieffer is also a keynote speaker on international issues, trade, the global economy, leadership, and organizational management.

Schieffer is a friend and former business partner of President George W. Bush. He is the younger brother of Bob Schieffer, a former CBS News reporter and host of Face the Nation. Schieffer and his wife, Susanne, reside in Fort Worth, Texas.

== Early life and education ==
John Thomas (Tom) Schieffer was born in Fort Worth, the youngest child of the late John E. Schieffer and the former Gladys Payne, both originally from Austin. His father was the managing partner of a construction company. His mother stayed home to rear the children.

In addition to his brother, Bob, Schieffer has a sister, Sharon Schieffer Mayes, who became a high school principal at Keller High School at a time when only two percent of the principals in Texas' largest high schools were women. She also had a successful career as an administrator in the Keller Independent School District.

Schieffer grew up in Fort Worth attending public schools and graduated from Arlington Heights High School in 1966. He attended the University of Texas at Austin, receiving a B.A. degree in 1970 in government and earned a master's degree in international relations in 1972. His master's thesis was entitled, "An Examination of the Nuclear Weapons Debate in India". The thesis correctly predicted that India would explode a nuclear device in 1974 and pursue the acquisition of nuclear weapons as the result of the security threat presented by China.

== Early political career ==
While in college, Schieffer worked in the offices of State Senator Don Kennard and Governor John Connally.

Schieffer ran in the 1972 Democratic primary against incumbent Speaker Pro-Tem Tommy Shannon, who was involved in the statewide Sharpstown scandal. After leading the primary and winning the run-off, Schieffer was nominated by Democrats to run at age 24. He won the general election that fall, winning county wide with more than 60% of the vote while Democratic presidential candidate George McGovern received just over 30% in the state. Sworn in at age 25, Schieffer was one of the youngest members of the class of 1972.

The first piece of legislation Schieffer passed was a bill renaming the State Finance Building the Lyndon B. Johnson State Office Building. Johnson, whom Schieffer admired greatly for passing the landmark civil rights bills of 1964, 1965 and 1968, had died in January 1973. During his first session, Schieffer successfully argued for funding the Fort Worth State School - a mental health facility - receiving the editorial kudos of the Fort Worth Star-Telegram for having "earned his spurs" as an effective legislator in Austin.

Re-elected with over 60% of the vote in the 1974 general election (he had no opposition in the Democratic primary), Schieffer was named Chairman of the Local and Consent Calendars Committee in his second term, a position he retained in his third term as well. Schieffer was the lead author on the bill that established the first Presidential primary in Texas. He was also the lead author on the bill that restricted the catch of redfish along the Texas coast, a measure that conservationists and wildlife enthusiasts had sought for years. Schieffer also co-authored legislation that closed a loophole on child care facilities that wanted to operate without meeting state standards.

The first two terms Schieffer was in the legislature, Tarrant County state representatives were elected countywide. After the Legislature passed a single member district plan, he was elected to a third term from a single member district. In January 1978, a federal court overturned the existing single member district plan and redrew the lines. Schieffer, who retained only one precinct out of his old district, carried every precinct in the Democratic primary but narrowly lost his seat to Republican Bob Ware in the general election.

Schieffer remained active in Democratic Party politics, supporting candidates like Senator Lloyd M. Bentsen, Jr., Governor Mark White, and Congressman Pete Geren.

== Legal career ==
After losing his legislative seat, Schieffer returned to course work at The University of Texas law school. At the time, Texas law allowed legislators who had served three terms to take the State Bar exam a year early if they had taken two years of course work at an accredited law school. Schieffer completed his two years and passed the state bar exam. He was admitted to the practice of law on October 31, 1979, and became a corporate lawyer in Fort Worth, specializing in the oil and gas industry.

== Civic and board experiences ==
In civic matters, Schieffer was appointed a Trustee of the Tarrant County Junior College (now Tarrant County College) and was elected to a full term without opposition. Schieffer served as a board member of the Texas Commerce Bank in Fort Worth and as an advisory board member to the bank when it was later acquired by JPMorgan Chase.

In addition, Schieffer served on the board of Drew Industries, a New York Stock Exchange-listed company. Always interested in educational issues, Schieffer has served on the boards of the Winston School in Dallas, the Tarrant County Community College Foundation, the Dallas County Community College Foundation, and the Penrose Foundation, which provides college scholarships for Hispanic students. Schieffer also served on the Texas Rangers Foundation Board and was active with his wife Susanne in Habitat for Humanity, the Food Bank of Tarrant County, and the Dallas Can Academy.

Schieffer currently serves on a number of national and International Boards. He is a member of the International High Speed Rail Association Board headquartered in Japan; the International Advisory Board of the Mansfield Foundation in Washington; the Council of American Ambassadors Board in Washington; the honorary board of the Japan America Society of Dallas-Fort Worth, and is an honorary counselor of the US-Japan Council. He was elected a member of the American Academy of Diplomacy in 2016.

== Texas Rangers baseball club ==
Schieffer's success in his law practice and business career allowed him to join an investment group led by George W. Bush and Edward W. (Rusty) Rose that bought the Texas Rangers baseball club on April 21, 1989. Having begun as only an investor in the group, Bush and Rose asked Schieffer to be the Partner-In-Charge of Ballpark Development in July 1990. Schieffer toured ballparks around America and successfully negotiated a public-private partnership with the City of Arlington, which became a model for cooperation between cities and private entities in development projects. The Rangers and the City of Arlington announced a new stadium deal in October 1990. An election was held in January 1991, which sought the approval of Arlington voters. More people voted in that special election than had voted in the combined Democratic and Republican primaries the year before. The citizens of Arlington approved the agreement by a 65% - 35% margin. The turnout remains the largest in Arlington's history for a special election. The Ballpark in Arlington was opened in 1994 on time and on budget. It received rave reviews from fans inside and outside of Arlington.

After passage of the referendum in January 1991, Schieffer was named President of the Rangers and served in that position longer than any other individual has. When George W. Bush became governor in 1995, Schieffer was named to succeed Bush as the team's Co-Managing General Partner along with Rusty Rose. The franchise won its first division title in 1996. They won the division again in 1998 and 1999.

The Bush-Rose partnership sold the franchise in 1998 to Dallas investor Tom Hicks. Under the terms of the sale, Schieffer was required to stay as president of the club for an additional year. Schieffer resigned as President of the Rangers in April 1999. While Schieffer was President of the Rangers, he also served as President of the J. Thomas Schieffer Management Company and the Pablo Operating Company, two entities that managed investments and oil and gas properties for clients.

On August 23, 2014, Schieffer was inducted into the Texas Rangers Hall of Fame for his contributions to the franchise.

== Ambassador of the United States to Australia ==
In April 2001, President Bush asked Schieffer to become the Ambassador of the United States to Australia. He accepted and presented his credentials in Canberra on August 23, 2001, as the 22nd representative of the U.S. president. His two immediate predecessors had been Directors-General of the U.S. Foreign Service, although it has been noted that Australian governments sometimes value a U.S. Ambassador's personal links to the president currently in office.

Returning to America to attend the first summit between Prime Minister John Howard and President Bush on September 10, 2001, Schieffer was in Washington on September 11, 2001, when the September 11 attacks occurred. Returning to Australia on September 12 with the Prime Minister on board Air Force Two, Schieffer and the White House worked with the Prime Minister and the Australian government to invoke the ANZUS treaty for the first time in its 50-year history so that Australia could come to the aid of the United States as a result of the terrorists' attack. Subsequently, Schieffer attended five more war time summits with the President and Australian Prime Minister in the next three and a half years as Australia helped America in Afghanistan and Iraq. During his tenure in Canberra, he coordinated closely with the Government of Australia on efforts to fight global terrorism and helped to deepen cooperation on rebuilding efforts in Afghanistan and Iraq.

During Schieffer's tenure in Australia, the United States also negotiated a free-trade agreement with Australia and significantly deepened the intelligence ties between the two countries. In his report to the State Department, the Inspector General said that Schieffer had exhibited extraordinary leadership and organizational skills in leading the American Embassy in Canberra. The Inspector General said he had examined 83 embassies around the world and had found none that would compare. Later, the State Department recognized the business plan for the Embassy organized by Schieffer as one of the three best in the world. After Bush's victory in the November 2004 presidential election, Schieffer announced that he would not be serving another term in Canberra. He returned to the United States at the end of 2004, although he did not formally resign as ambassador until April 1, 2005.

== Ambassador of the United States to Japan ==
Based upon his work in Australia, then-Secretary of State Colin Powell and Deputy Secretary of State Richard Armitage recommended to President Bush that Ambassador Schieffer be moved to Japan to replace the retiring former Senate Majority Leader Howard Baker as ambassador. Schieffer became one of only three non-career appointees to serve in both the first and second terms of the Bush administration as an Ambassador. On April 1, 2005, Schieffer was sworn in as the 22nd Ambassador of the United States to Japan, having been confirmed by the United States Senate unanimously for the second time.

During his tenure in Japan, Schieffer was again cited by the office of the Inspector General for an exemplary job of leading and managing the 1000-plus personnel embassy. He was also intimately involved in negotiating the most far-reaching reorganization of the U.S.-Japan alliance since the signing of the Security Agreement in 1960. The U.S.-Japan alliance has been and continues to be the linchpin of both countries' security in Asia and the Pacific. Under the terms of the new agreement, Japan agreed to provide billions of dollars in assistance to the United States to help modernize U.S. facilities in Japan. Schieffer was also instrumental in strengthening the intelligence ties between the two countries. Heavily involved in the six-party talks, which centered on North Korea's attempts to become a nuclear weapons state, Schieffer was also praised by both Japan and U.S. officials for diplomatic skills throughout the talks. Schieffer was praised by Japan and U.S. human rights groups for keeping the issue of the abduction of Japanese citizens by North Korean intelligence agents before negotiators. During his time in Japan, Schieffer attended five more summits with the U.S. president and three Japanese prime ministers including the 2008 G-8 Summit in Hokkaido. He departed this post on January 20, 2009.

== Honors ==
In November 2013, the Emperor of Japan awarded Schieffer the Grand Cordon of the Order of the Rising Sun, the highest honor that can be bestowed on a foreigner to recognize his significant contributions in promoting friendly relations and understanding between the United States and Japan. Schieffer was appointed an Officer of the Order of Australia, the highest award that can be presented to a foreigner by the Australian government, for his work in strengthening the Australian American Alliance. After ending his almost eight year diplomatic career, Secretary of Defense Robert Gates awarded Schieffer the Department of Defense Medal for Distinguished Public Service, the highest civilian award The Pentagon has to offer, for his work in strengthening the US - Japan Alliance. The Federal Bureau of Investigation honored him for his efforts to combat the international scourge of child pornography. The Director of National Intelligence awarded him the National Intelligence Reform Medal. The Central Intelligence Agency presented him with the Donovan Award. The Defense Intelligence Agency presented him with the Director's Award Medal. The National Security Agency presented him the Director's Distinguished Service Medal. The National Geospatial-Intelligence Agency presented him its Medallion for Excellence. All of the medals and awards presented to Schieffer by members of the intelligence community were for his work in strengthening and reforming the intelligence cooperation between the United States and Australia, and the United States and Japan.

== Family ==
Schieffer is married to Susanne Silber Schieffer, who is originally from San Antonio. She was the director of a small state agency before they were married. They have one son.

== Gubernatorial candidacy ==
On March 2, 2009, Tom Schieffer announced that he was forming an exploratory committee to consider seeking the Democratic nomination for Governor of Texas in 2010. In June, Schieffer formally announced his candidacy. His campaign stressed the importance of improving education in a fast, globalizing world to enhance the future competitiveness of Texas. Despite raising over $1 million for his campaign, Schieffer withdrew from the race on November 23, 2009, citing an inability to raise enough cash to fund an effective campaign. He urged Houston Mayor Bill White to enter the race instead. White announced his candidacy for governor on December 4, 2009. He would win the Democratic nomination but lose the general election to incumbent Rick Perry.

== Los Angeles Dodgers ==
On April 25, 2011, Major League Baseball Commissioner Bud Selig, who had taken over operations of the struggling Los Angeles Dodgers franchise, announced that he was appointing Schieffer to monitor the club's business and financial operations. Schieffer's oversight of the franchise ended when the Dodgers filed for Chapter 11 Bankruptcy on June 27, 2011.

== See also ==
- List of United States political appointments that crossed party lines

Sporting positions
Preceded by Mike Stone	Texas Rangers President; 1991–1999	Succeeded by Jim Lites
Diplomatic posts
Preceded by Edward William Gnehm, Jr.	U.S. Ambassador to Australia; 2001 – 2005	Succeeded by Robert McCallum, Jr
Preceded by Howard Baker	U.S. Ambassador to Japan; 2005 – 2009	Succeeded by John Roos
