= John Schmidt =

United States Associate Attorney General from 1994 to 1997

United States Associate Attorney General
- In office 1994–1997
- President: Bill Clinton
- Preceded by: Webster Hubbell
- Succeeded by: Raymond C. Fisher

Personal details
- Party: Democratic

John R. Schmidt is a lawyer and former United States Associate Attorney General who served from 1994 to 1997 under President Bill Clinton. His responsibilities included oversight of the Civil, Antitrust, Civil Rights, Environment and Tax Divisions. He was also responsible for all aspects of the 1994 Federal Crime Control and Law Enforcement Act, including its program to put 100,000 more police into community policing across the United States.

Schmidt ran for the Democratic nomination for Governor of Illinois in the 1998 primary, losing to Congressman Glenn Poshard. He then ran for the Democratic nomination for Illinois Attorney General in 2002, losing to Lisa Madigan.

Prior to his service as Associate Attorney General, Schmidt served as Ambassador and Chief United States Negotiator to the Uruguay Round under the General Agreement on Tariffs and Trade. He previously served as the first Chief of Staff for Chicago Mayor Richard M. Daley. He was also Chair of the Metropolitan Pier & Exposition Authority, a joint state-city agency that was responsible for the redevelopment of Navy Pier in downtown Chicago.

Schmidt is a partner in the Chicago law firm of Mayer Brown LLP.

Legal offices
Preceded by Webster Hubbell	United States Associate Attorney General; 1994–1997	Succeeded by Raymond C. Fisher
