= Jesse Panuccio =

American lawyer (born 1980)

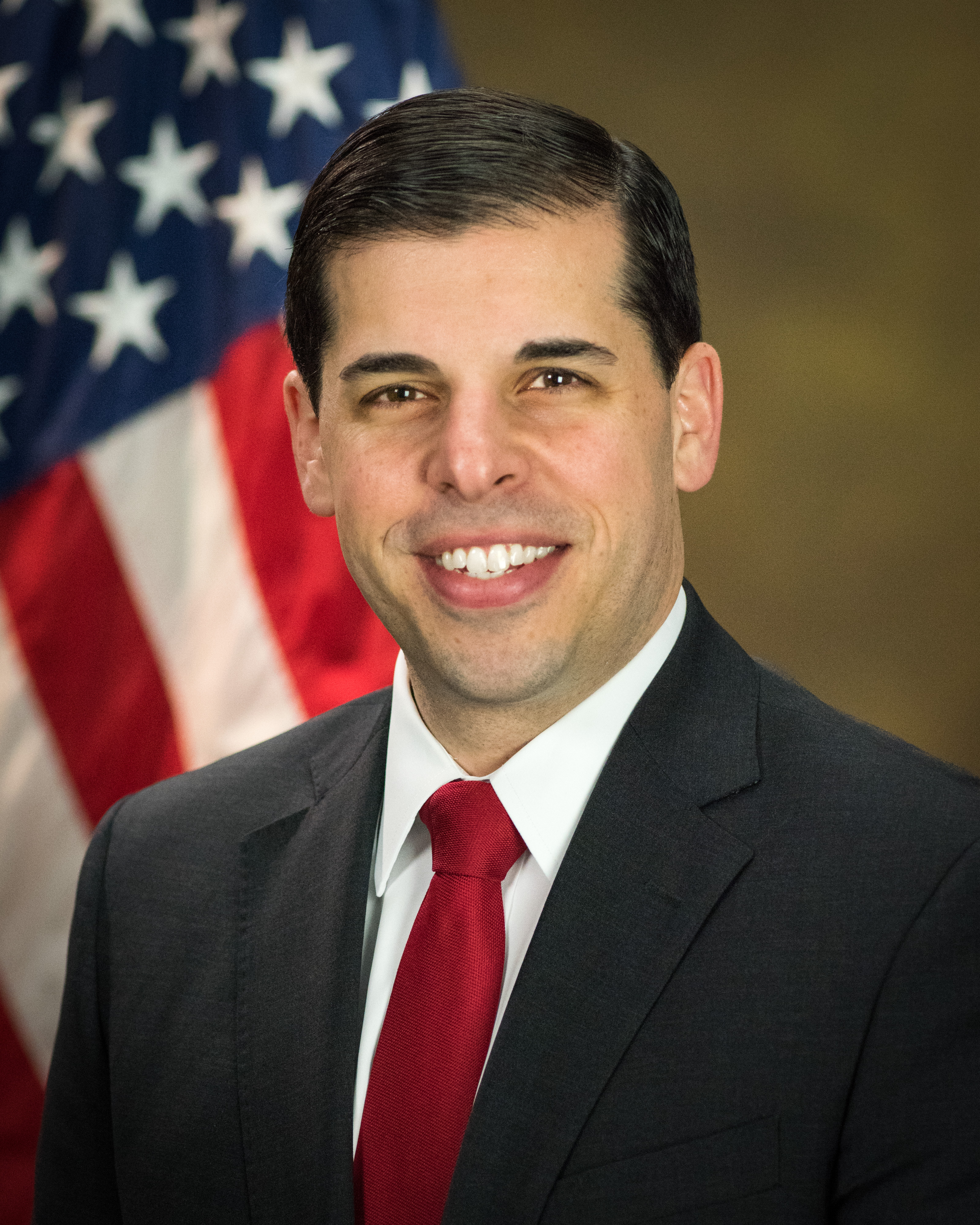

United States Associate Attorney General
- Acting
- In office February 21, 2018 – May 3, 2019
- President: Donald Trump
- Preceded by: Rachel Brand
- Succeeded by: Claire McCusker Murray (acting)
- In office February 2017 – May 22, 2017
- President: Donald Trump
- Preceded by: William Baer (acting)
- Succeeded by: Rachel Brand

Personal details
- Born: Jesse Michael Panuccio; November 1, 1980 (age 45) New Jersey, U.S.
- Party: Republican
- Education: Duke University (BA); Harvard University (JD)

Jesse Michael Panuccio (born November 1, 1980) is an American attorney and government official. He served as the acting United States Associate Attorney General in 2017 and again from February 2018 to May 2019. He previously served as general counsel to Governor Rick Scott of Florida and as the executive director of the Florida Department of Economic Opportunity.

== Education ==
Panuccio received a Bachelor of Arts from Duke University, and a Juris Doctor from Harvard Law School, magna cum laude, in 2006.

== Legal career ==
Panuccio is a member of the Florida and District of Columbia bars. Panuccio served as a law clerk to Judge Michael W. McConnell of the U.S. Court of Appeals for the Tenth Circuit.

Panuccio then practiced law with the Washington D.C.–based law firm Cooper & Kirk PLLC.

== Florida government service ==
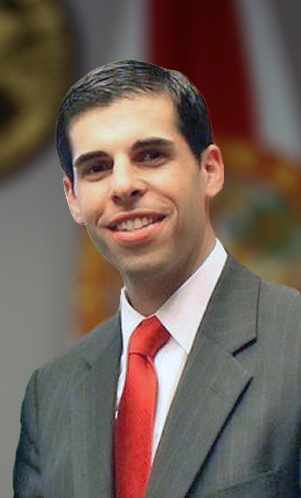
Panuccio's Florida government headshot

Panuccio joined the administration of Governor Rick Scott as deputy general counsel in January 2011 after a law school friend working on Scott's campaign suggested that Panuccio should join Scott's transition team. In 2012, Governor Scott appointed Panuccio general counsel to the governor. In those roles, Panuccio represented the governor and the state in several significant legal challenges, including challenges to drug testing of state employees and welfare recipients as well as a required state-worker pension contribution. He also advised the governor on judicial appointments and served as chief ethics officer for the Executive Office of the Governor.

In January 2013, Scott appointed Panuccio executive director of the Florida Department of Economic Opportunity. At the time, Panuccio was 32 years old and was the youngest agency head in Florida government. During his tenure, Panuccio wrote an op-ed in the Miami Herald about the departments efforts to combat fraud in the unemployment insurance program, and an op-ed in The Wall Street Journal opposing the U.S. Department of Labor's proposed changes to its overtime rules. In December 2015, Panuccio announced his resignation, effective January 8, 2016.

On January 25, 2016, Governor Scott appointed Panuccio to the Florida Supreme Court Judicial Nominating Commission.

== Department of Justice service ==
In January 2017, Panuccio was named acting Associate Attorney General of the United States. Panuccio's former boss and mentor, Chuck Cooper of Cooper & Kirk, was advising Senator Jeff Sessions on staffing President-elect Donald Trump's transition team and recommended Panuccio for the position. The associate attorney general is the third highest-ranking official at the U.S. Department of Justice, and oversees virtually all non-criminal matters. After newly confirmed attorney general William Barr took office, he resigned from office and was succeeded by former White House official Claire McCusker Murray.

Legal offices
| Preceded by William Baer | United States Associate Attorney General; Acting; 2017 | Succeeded by Rachel Brand |
| Preceded by Rachel Brand | United States Associate Attorney General; Acting; 2018–2019 | Succeeded by Claire McCusker Murray |
