= John A. Danaher III =

American politician (born 1950)

Commissioner State of Connecticut Department of Public Safety
- In office March 2007 – March 2010
- Preceded by: Leonard Boyle
- Succeeded by: James M. Thomas

47th United States Attorney for the District of Connecticut
- In office May 2001 – November 2002
- Preceded by: Stephen C. Robinson
- Succeeded by: Kevin J. O'Connor

Personal details
- Born: August 22, 1950 (age 76) West Hartford, Connecticut, U.S.
- Party: Democrat
- Spouse: Anne Morrison Danaher
- Education: Fairfield University (BA); University of Hartford (MA); University of Connecticut (JD)
- Occupation: Attorney

John A. Danaher III (born August 22, 1950) is a Connecticut Superior Court judge sitting in Litchfield, Connecticut. Between March 5, 2007, and May 5, 2010, he served as the Commissioner of the State of Connecticut Department of Public Safety. In addition, Judge Danaher previously served as the 47th U.S. attorney for the District of Connecticut from May 2001 to November 2002 during which he supervised federal prosecutions of former Waterbury Mayor Philip Giordano and former Bridgeport Mayor Joseph Ganim.

== Legal career ==
Prior to his legal career, Judge Danaher taught science and English. Upon graduation from law school, Judge Danaher served as a clerk to the Honorable T. Emmet Clarie. Judge Danaher worked at the Hartford, Connecticut firm of Day, Berry & Howard from 1981 to 1986 before joining the United States Attorney's Office in July 1986. At the United States Attorney's Office, among other things, Judge Danaher was part of the team that investigated Los Macheteros. He went on to serve as Assistant-in-Charge of the Hartford Office from January 1994 to April 2000 and Deputy United States Attorney from April 2000 to May 2001. From 2001 to 2002, Judge Danaher served as the United States Attorney for the District of Connecticut. He held the title of Senior Litigation Counsel from January 2003 until February 2007 when Connecticut Governor M. Jodi Rell nominated Judge Danaher to be Commissioner of the Department of Public Safety.

== Education ==
Judge Danaher received his bachelor's degree Fairfield University in 1972; his master's degree in English from the University of Hartford in 1977; and his Juris Doctor (J.D.) degree from the University of Connecticut School of Law in 1980.

== Personal ==
Judge Danaher's grandfather, John A. Danaher, was a United States Senator from Connecticut from 1939 to 1945 and served as a circuit judge of the United States Court of Appeals for the District of Columbia Circuit.
