= Thomas J. Perrelli =

American lawyer

Tom Perrelli
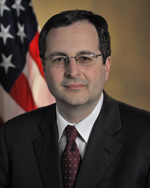

United States Associate Attorney General
- In office March 12, 2009 – February 2012
- President: Barack Obama
- Preceded by: Kevin O'Connor
- Succeeded by: Tony West

Personal details
- Born: March 12, 1966 (age 60) Falls Church, Virginia, U.S.
- Party: Democratic
- Education: Brown University (BA); Harvard University (JD)

Thomas John Perrelli (born March 12, 1966) is an American lawyer and the former United States associate attorney general. He served as associate attorney general during the administration of President Barack Obama. Perrelli also served as deputy assistant attorney general of the United States in the late 1990s.

== Early life and education ==
As a high school senior at W.T. Woodson H.S., he was co-captain of the Fairfax All-County Math Team. He was a three time National Junior Classical League Certamen (Latin competition) champion. Also, his freshman year at Brown, 1984, he placed first in the annual William Lowell Putnam Mathematical Competition.

Perrelli earned his A.B., magna cum laude, in history from Brown University in 1988, where he served as editor-in-chief of The Critical Review, Brown's student publication of course evaluations. Perrelli graduated from Harvard Law School, magna cum laude, in 1991, where he was managing editor of the Harvard Law Review, working under Barack Obama, who was president of the Harvard Law Review at the time. Perrelli is admitted to practice before the United States Supreme Court, the Virginia and District of Columbia courts and numerous other federal courts. Prior to joining Jenner & Block, in 1991–92, Perrelli clerked for Royce C. Lamberth of the United States District Court for the District of Columbia.

== Career ==
=== Jenner & Block ===
Before joining the Obama administration, Perelli was managing partner of Jenner & Block's Washington office, co-chair of the firm's Entertainment and New Media Practice, and a member of the firm's Appellate and Supreme Court, Class Action Litigation, Health Care Law, Intellectual Property, Litigation & Dispute Resolution, Media and First Amendment, and Telecommunications Practices. He was a member of the firm's Management Committee. He concentrated his practice on copyright, media, and constitutional litigation, as well as complex litigation with a public policy or regulatory component. In 2005, The National Law Journal listed him among the nation's 40 most promising lawyers under 40.

Perrelli regularly represented the recording industry in intellectual property, technology, and anti-copyright-infringement litigation. He has represented the recording industry in a host of cases arising under the Digital Millennium Copyright Act (DMCA), as well as in copyright infringement and digital piracy litigation. Since his return to Jenner and Block in 2001, Perrelli has also represented Democratic voters and elected officials in redistricting litigation arising out of the 2000 census.

He represented Michael Schiavo (2003–2005) and won for him the right to terminate his wife's life support.

=== Clinton administration ===
In 1997, Perrelli left Jenner & Block to join the Department of Justice and served as counsel to Attorney General Janet Reno. He subsequently rose to Deputy Assistant Attorney General, supervising the Federal Programs Branch of the Civil Division, which represents virtually every federal agency in complex civil litigation. In that role, Perrelli led a staff of 100 attorneys charged with defending the constitutionality of federal statutes, defending federal agency action and regulations, representing the diplomatic and national security interests of the United States in courts of law, and conducting significant Title VII, personnel and social security litigation.

Perrelli also supervised the Justice Department's Tobacco Litigation Team in its litigation against the major cigarette manufacturers. In addition, he played a leading role on significant policy issues ranging from medical records privacy and the use of adjusted figures in the census to Indian gaming and legal ethics.

=== Obama administration ===
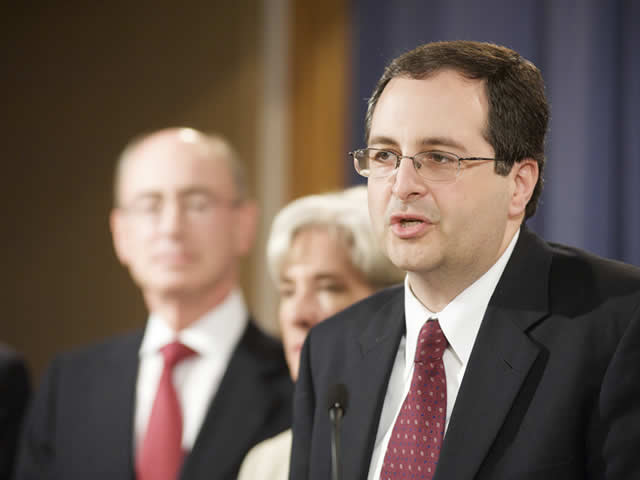
Associate Attorney General Tom Perelli at a 2009 Pfizer Settlement Press Conference

On January 5, 2009, president-elect Barack Obama nominated Perrelli as the 18th associate attorney general of the United States. He was confirmed by the United States Senate in a 72–20 vote on March 12, 2009.

Perrelli ordered career attorneys in the Civil Rights Division to drop a civil case they had prepared (under the 1965 Voting Rights Act) against members of the New Black Panther Party for voter intimidation at Philadelphia polling places in the 2008 United States elections.

In February 2012, Perrelli resigned from his post as associate attorney general.

== Bibliography ==
- "Defending Lanham Act Claims Against Expressive Works and Raising a Defense Based on the First Amendment," Media Law Resource Bulletin, January 2004
- "Piracy Battles Online," Copyright World, February 2003
- Deanne Maynard and Tom Perrelli, "9th Circuit Denies Dustin Hoffman's Publicity Claim," National Law Journal, C4, October 22, 2001
- Case Note, "Search and Seizure -- Suspicionless Drug Testing," 103 Harvard Law Review 592, 1989
- Case Comment, "Section 1983: Golden State Transit Corp. v. Los Angeles," 104 Harvard Law Review 339, 1990

Legal offices
| Preceded by Kevin O'Connor | United States Associate Attorney General; 2009–2012 | Succeeded by Tony West |
