= Daniel Marcus (lawyer) =

American lawyer

12th United States Associate Attorney General
- In office 1999–2001
- President: Bill Clinton
- Preceded by: Raymond C. Fisher
- Succeeded by: Jay B. Stephens

Personal details
- Born: January 5, 1941 (age 84); Brooklyn, New York, U.S.
- Education: Brandeis University (BA); Yale University (LLB)

Daniel Marcus (born January 5, 1941) is an American lawyer and member of the faculty of Washington College of Law.

== Early life and education ==
Born in Brooklyn, Marcus graduated from Brandeis University in 1962. He also received an LL.B. in 1965 from Yale Law School, and was an editor of the Yale Law Journal.

== Career ==
Marcus began his career as a law clerk for Judge Harold Leventhal of the United States Court of Appeals for the District of Columbia Circuit. He was a partner at the Washington law firm of Wilmer, Cutler & Pickering for many years, before leaving to become deputy general counsel of the Department of Health, Education and Welfare and then general counsel of the United States Department of Agriculture in the Carter administration.

Marcus returned to the law firm until 1998, when he entered the White House Counsel's office as senior counsel. Marcus then worked at the Department of Justice, where he held several positions, including United States associate attorney general.

After the expiration of the Clinton Administration, Marcus was a visiting professor at Georgetown University Law Center and general counsel of the 9/11 Commission. He subsequently joined the faculty of the American University Washington College of Law, where he continued to write and speak about legal issues in American politics.

== Selected publications ==
- "Restoring and Reviving the Department of Justice". Human Rights magazine, Vol. 35 No. 4. Fall 2008
- "The 9/11 Commission and the White House: Issues of Executive Privilege and Separation of Powers." American University National Security Brief 1, no. 1 (2010): 19-32.
