= Stuart M. Gerson =

American politician

United States Attorney General Acting
- In office January 20, 1993 – March 12, 1993
- President: Bill Clinton
- Deputy: Vacant
- Preceded by: George J. Terwilliger III (acting)
- Succeeded by: Janet Reno

United States Assistant Attorney General for the Civil Division
- In office October 24, 1989 – March 19, 1993
- President: George H. W. Bush; Bill Clinton
- Preceded by: John Bolton
- Succeeded by: Frank W. Hunger

Personal details
- Born: Stuart Michael Gerson; January 16, 1944 (age 82) New York City, New York, U.S.
- Party: Republican
- Education: Pennsylvania State University, University Park (BA); Georgetown University (JD)

Stuart Michael Gerson (born January 16, 1944) is an American politician and attorney who served as the acting United States Attorney General during the Clinton Administration, serving in the early months of 1993.

Gerson was a debate coach for President George H. W. Bush during the 1988 campaign and went on to serve on President-elect Bush's transition team. Gerson was part of the Bush Administration's National Health Policy Working Group, serving as head of its Medical Malpractice Reform Working Group. At the Department of Justice (DOJ), he was the Assistant Attorney General for the Civil Division.

Gerson was acting United States Attorney General from January 20, 1993, to March 12, 1993. He was in the position for two reasons. Clinton had problems in finding an Attorney General during that period. Also, he was fourth in the line of succession at the Justice Department (other senior DOJ officials had already resigned). Gerson supported the Brady bill and was in office during the beginnings of the Waco siege. Janet Reno, President Clinton's nominee for Attorney General, was sworn in on March 12, and he resigned the same day. Gerson's last day at the Justice Department was March 19.

Legal offices
Preceded by John Bolton	United States Assistant Attorney General for the Civil Division; 1989–1993	Succeeded by Frank W. Hunger
Preceded by George J. Terwilliger III; Acting	United States Attorney General; Acting; 1993	Succeeded by Janet Reno
