= David R. Thompson =

American judge (1930–2011)

David Renwick Thompson

Senior Judge of the United States Court of Appeals for the Ninth Circuit
- In office December 31, 1998 – February 19, 2011

Judge of the United States Court of Appeals for the Ninth Circuit
- In office December 17, 1985 – December 31, 1998
- Appointed by: Ronald Reagan
- Preceded by: Seat established by 98 Stat. 333
- Succeeded by: Raymond C. Fisher

Personal details
- Born: David Renwick Thompson; December 26, 1930 San Diego, California
- Died: February 19, 2011 (aged 80) San Francisco, California
- Education: University of Southern California (BS, LLB)

David Renwick Thompson (December 26, 1930 – February 19, 2011) was a United States circuit judge of the United States Court of Appeals for the Ninth Circuit.

== Education and career ==
Thompson was born in San Diego, California and graduated from Point Loma High School. He received a Bachelor of Science degree in business from University of Southern California in 1952 and a Bachelor of Laws from University of Southern California Gould School of Law in 1955. He passed the State Bar of California in 1955. He was in the United States Navy from 1955 to 1957. He was in private practice of law in San Diego from 1957 to 1985.

== Federal judicial service ==
On October 7, 1985, Thompson was nominated by President Ronald Reagan to a new seat on the United States Court of Appeals for the Ninth Circuit created by 98 Stat. 333. He was confirmed by the United States Senate on December 16, 1985, and received commission on December 17, 1985. He assumed senior status on December 31, 1998, serving in that status until his death.

== Death ==
Thompson died on February 19, 2011, after a sudden illness. Thompson had traveled to San Francisco to hear oral arguments in several cases. He died at the city's St. Mary's Medical Center.

== Sources ==
Legal offices
Preceded by Seat established by 98 Stat. 333	Judge of the United States Court of Appeals for the Ninth Circuit; 1985–1998	Succeeded by Raymond C. Fisher
