= Tony West (attorney) =

American lawyer (born 1965)

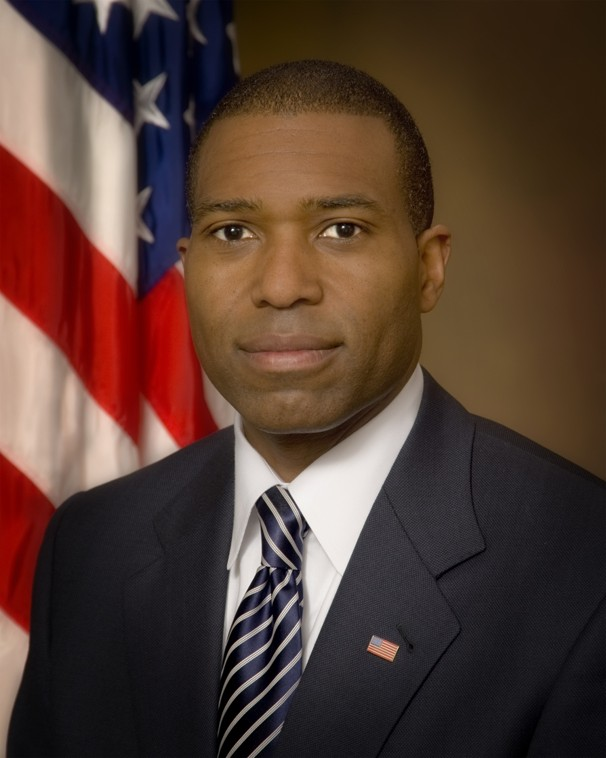
- West in 2013

17th United States Associate Attorney General
- In office March 12, 2012 – September 15, 2014
- President: Barack Obama
- Preceded by: Thomas Perrelli
- Succeeded by: Rachel Brand (2017)

United States Assistant Attorney General for the Civil Division
- In office April 20, 2009 – March 12, 2012
- President: Barack Obama
- Preceded by: Gregory G. Katsas
- Succeeded by: Stuart F. Delery

Personal details
- Born: Derek Anthony West; August 12, 1965 (age 61) San Francisco, California, U.S.
- Party: Democratic
- Spouse: Maya Harris (m. 1998)
- Relatives: Kamala Harris (sister-in-law); Meena Harris (stepdaughter)
- Education: Harvard University (BA); Stanford University (JD)

Derek Anthony West (born August 12, 1965) is an American attorney, former government official, and the senior vice president and chief legal officer of Uber. Before Uber, West was the 17th associate attorney general of the United States and general counsel of PepsiCo. West previously served as the assistant attorney general of the Civil Division, the largest litigating division in the Department of Justice, and was the first African American to hold that position.

During his time at the Department of Justice, West played a role in the administration's decision to stop defending the Defense of Marriage Act (DOMA) after concluding that the statute was unconstitutional. West was also involved in efforts by the department to reclaim $37 billion from large financial institutions and worked on the department's efforts to improve public safety in Indian country, including the tribal provisions in the 2013 reauthorization of the Violence Against Women Act (VAWA). On August 21, 2014, West announced a $16.65 billion settlement with Bank of America to resolve federal and state claims against Bank of America including its existing and former subsidiaries, including Countrywide Financial Corporation and Merrill Lynch.

West is the brother-in-law of former Vice President Kamala Harris. He served as an advisor to her 2024 presidential campaign.

== Early life and education ==
West was born in San Francisco, California, the son of Margaret "Peggy" (née Reddick) and Franklin Delano West (1940–2013). West was raised in San Jose, California, where he lived with his two younger sisters, Pamela and Patricia. His father, the first person in his family to attend college, was born and raised in Georgia and worked for IBM while his mother, who was a teacher, was born and raised in Alabama. He attended Bellarmine College Preparatory, a Catholic, all-male, private secondary school, where he served as freshman class president, before graduating in 1983.

West earned his Bachelor of Arts in government from Harvard College in 1987, where he served as publisher of the Harvard Political Review. In 1988, West began volunteering and working on political campaigns, engaging in Democratic political causes, such as working as the chief of staff to the Boston, Massachusetts treasurer of Michael Dukakis's presidential campaign. West also served as a finance director to the Democratic Governors Association, until 1989. He earned his Juris Doctor from Stanford Law School in 1992, where he served as the president of the Stanford Law Review. While attending Stanford, he worked as a summer intern for Swidler Berlin Shereff Friedman in 1990. He also worked as a summer intern for Tuttle & Taylor, and Morrison & Foerster in 1991.

== Career ==
After graduating, West continued his work in Democratic politics, working as chief of staff to the finance chair of the California Democratic Party, while also working in private practice as an associate at the Bingham McCutchen San Jose office, from 1992 to 1993. In 1993, he was admitted to the State Bar of California, and was admitted to the Superior Court of California and the U.S. District Court for the Northern District of California.

From 1999 to 2001, he was a Special Assistant Attorney General in the Office of the California Attorney General, under Bill Lockyer. From 2001 to 2009, he was a litigation partner at Morrison & Foerster LLP in San Francisco. He also served as the California co-chairman of Barack Obama's 2008 presidential campaign.

West serves on the board of directors for the NAACP Legal Defense and Educational Fund, Inc.

=== U.S. Department of Justice ===
West began his career at the Justice Department when he joined the Clinton administration in 1993, as a Special Assistant under Philip Heymann, the Deputy Attorney General of the United States Department of Justice, until 1994, when he was appointed as an Assistant United States Attorney (AUSA) for the Northern District of California. As an Assistant U.S. Attorney, West prosecuted child sexual exploitation, fraud, narcotics distribution, interstate theft, and high tech crime.

In 2009, West returned to the Justice Department when President Obama nominated him to serve as Assistant Attorney General of the Department of Justice Civil Division. West led the Obama Administration's review of the constitutionality of the Defense of Marriage Act (DOMA), which ultimately resulted in President Obama's and Attorney General Holder's decision to stop defending DOMA. During his tenure at the helm of the Civil Division, the Division recovered more than $8.8 billion in taxpayer money under the False Claims Act. On the consumer protection front, West oversaw cases that resulted in more than 115 criminal convictions, as well as recoveries of more than $3.5 billion, during his three-year tenure.

==== Associate Attorney General ====
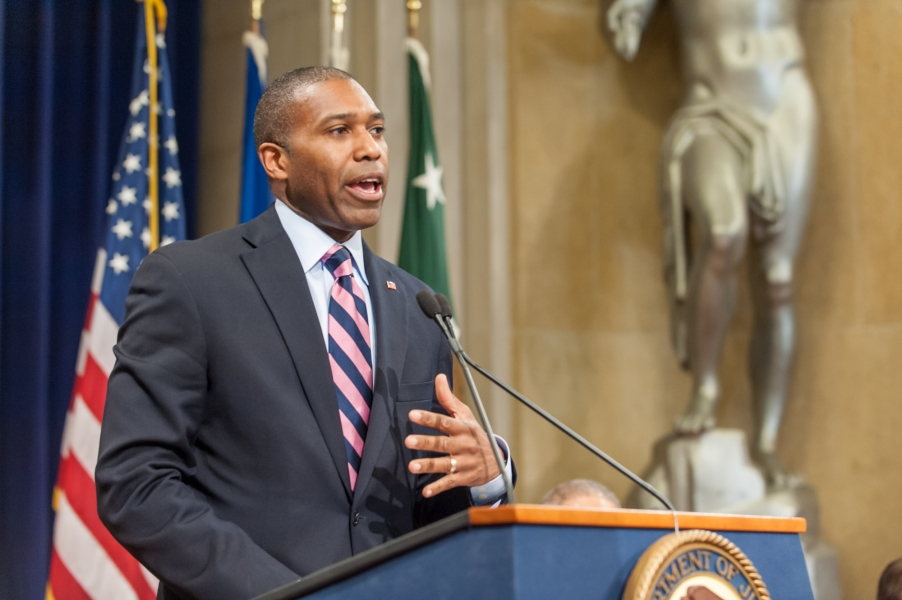
Tony West speaks at the U.S. Department of Justice in 2013.

Beginning on March 9, 2012, West served as the Acting Associate Attorney General until the U.S. Senate confirmed West to be Associate Attorney General in a 98–1 vote on July 25, 2013. In September 2014, when Attorney General Eric Holder announced his intention to step down, West was speculated as being a potential successor as the next United States Attorney General.

As Associate Attorney General, West led the department's efforts against financial institutions in connection with their roles in precipitating the Great Recession. These include two of the largest civil resolutions against a single entity in American history: Bank of America ($16.65 billion) and JPMorgan ($13 billion). In total, the department's efforts recovered nearly $37 billion.

Additionally, West led the department's investigation and filing of a civil lawsuit against the credit rating agency Standard & Poor's Rating Services for allegedly engaging in a scheme to defraud investors in structured financial products, resulting in the loss of billions of dollars by investors, many of whom are federally-insured financial institutions. The investigation and lawsuit involved collaboration with several state attorneys general offices, a number of which also filed civil fraud lawsuits against S&P alleging similar misconduct in the rating of structured financial products.

West also oversaw constitutional policing enforcement actions by the Civil Rights Division and led the department's negotiations with Puerto Rico to reach a historic agreement that requires the Commonwealth's police department to implement and sustain a wide range of constitutional policies and procedures, including those that address use of force, equal protection and non-discrimination, and community engagement.

West also led the department's commitment to supporting the provision of indigent legal defense. In June 2014, West represented the United States at the U.N.'s International Conference on Access to Legal Aid in the Criminal Justice Systems in South Africa. In 2013, West oversaw the department's filing of a statement of interest in Wilbur v. City of Mount Vernon (WD Wash.), a class action lawsuit alleging that accused defendants were systemically denied effective assistance of counsel. Without taking a position on the merits of the case, the filing requested that if the court found constitutional violations, it consider workload controls for public defenders and appointment of an independent monitor to ensure compliance. The plaintiffs in the case prevailed on the merits and the court required defendants to hire a part-time public defender supervisor to monitor and report the defendants' delivery of indigent defense representation.

===== Native American issues =====
During West's tenure as Associate Attorney General, the Justice Department secured passage of tribal provisions in the Violence Against Women Reauthorization Act of 2013, allowing tribal courts to prosecute non-Indian perpetrators of domestic violence in Indian country. West oversaw a consultation with tribes to implement the Pilot Project, which allowed tribes to exercise the special domestic violence criminal jurisdiction over non-Indians ahead of the law's March 2015 effective date. West authorized three tribes – the Pascua Yaqui Tribe of Arizona, the Tulalip Tribes of Washington, and the Confederated Tribes of the Umatilla Indian Reservation – to become the first tribes in the country to exercise the new jurisdiction. West also oversaw the creation and work of the Attorney General's Task Force on American Indian/Alaska Native Children Exposed to Violence, which included an Advisory Committee—chaired by Senator Byron Dorgan—of non-federal experts and an interagency Federal Working Group of high-level federal officials.

==== Supreme Court cases ====
- National Federation of Independent Business v. Sebelius, 132 S.Ct. 2566 (2012), 567 U.S. 519 (as Assistant Attorney General, one of several attorneys for Respondents)
- Ashcroft v. Al-Kidd, 131 S.Ct. 2074 (2011), 563 U.S. 731. (as Assistant Attorney General, one of several attorneys for the Petitioner.)
- Free Enterprise Fund v. Public Company Accounting Oversight Board, 130 S.Ct. 3138 (2010), 561 U.S. 477 (as Assistant Attorney General, one of several attorneys for the Respondent)

=== PepsiCo ===
On October 7, 2014, PepsiCo, Inc. announced that West had joined the company as executive vice president of government affairs, general counsel, and corporate secretary, effective November 24, 2014. West succeeded Larry Thompson, who retired after a decade with the company. West was responsible for PepsiCo's worldwide legal function and government affairs organization, as well as the company's global compliance function and the PepsiCo Foundation. He reported to PepsiCo Chairman and CEO Indra Nooyi.

=== Uber ===
In October 2017, West announced that he was leaving PepsiCo to take a position as General Counsel at Uber. This announcement shortly followed the completion of an investigation by former U.S. Attorney General Eric Holder into allegations of sexual harassment and discrimination at Uber.

In 2020, the first year in which West was named as an executive officer at Uber, he received nearly $12.3 million in total compensation. In 2021, West received $7.4 million in compensation from Uber, and in 2022 West received a pay package worth more than $10.6 million, an increase of 40% over the previous year. In 2023, West received almost $10.4 million in compensation from Uber.

=== Political campaigns ===
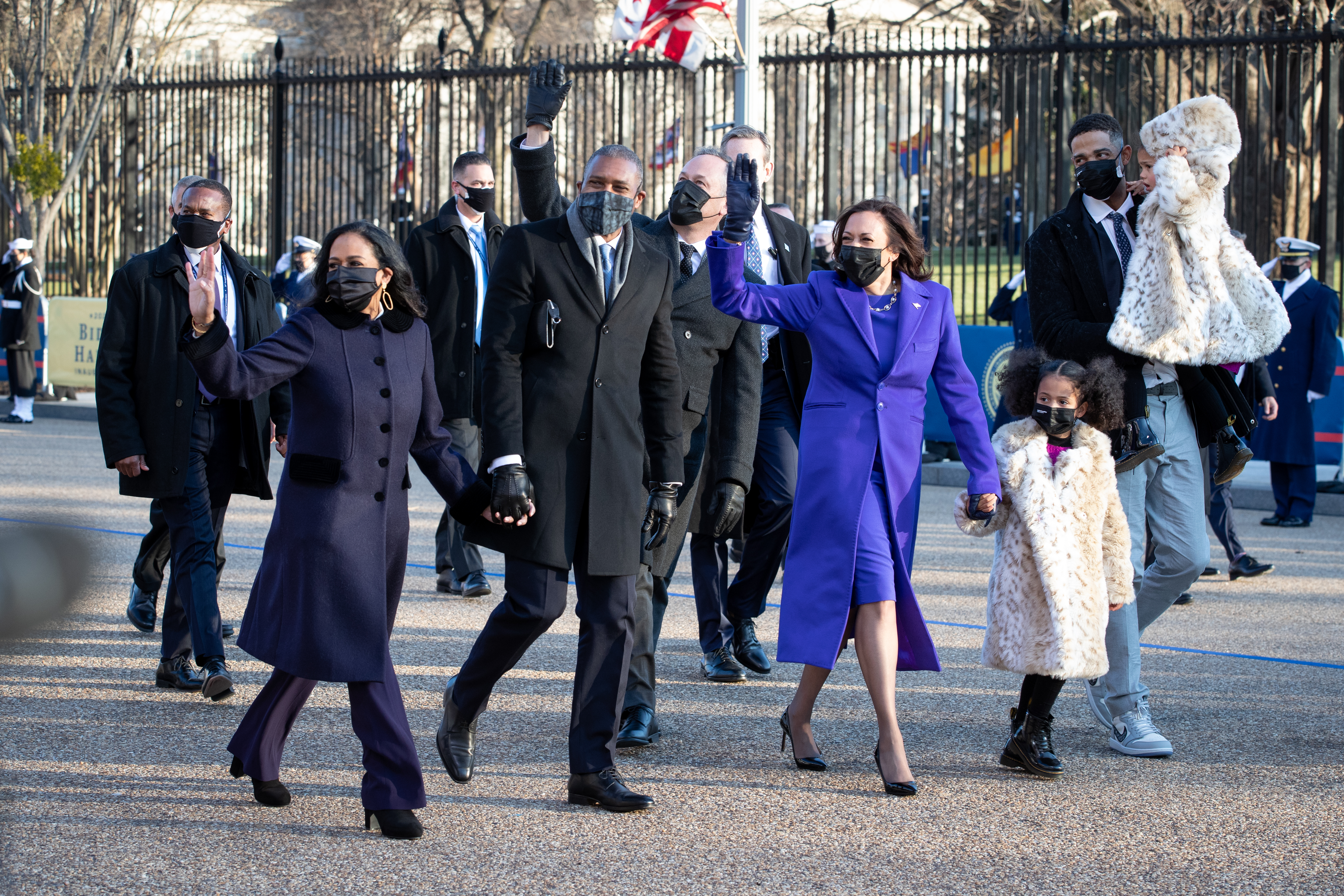
Vice President Harris and her family walk to the White House on Pennsylvania Avenue on January 20, 2021.

In 1998, West ran for a seat on the San Jose City Council. In the primary, West's main challenger was Cindy Chavez, the staff director of Working Partnerships USA. He came in second to Chavez in the June 2 primary, with 41.2% of the vote. West was ultimately defeated, receiving 48% of the vote in the general election.

West also ran for the California State Assembly, for the 23rd district, in 2000. After incumbent Mike Honda ran for the U.S. House of Representatives, leaving a vacancy, West was one of six Democrats to run for the open seat. He was defeated in the primary by San Jose City Councilman Manny Diaz, receiving 38% of the total votes cast.

West chaired the Barack Obama California fundraising committee for his run in 2008.

On November 30, 2016, Senator-elect Kamala Harris announced that West, her brother-in-law, would co-chair her transition team.

West served as an adviser for the Kamala Harris 2024 presidential campaign.

== Personal life ==
West married Maya Harris, the sister of former Vice President Kamala Harris, in July 1998. He is the stepfather to her daughter, Meena Harris, who Maya Harris had as a single parent. They were both in the class of 1992 at Stanford Law School. They became friends at school, but did not begin a relationship until after graduation.

Legal offices
| Preceded by Thomas Perrelli | United States Associate Attorney General; 2012–2014 | Succeeded by Rachel Brand |
