= John Roos =

American lawyer and diplomat

John V. Roos
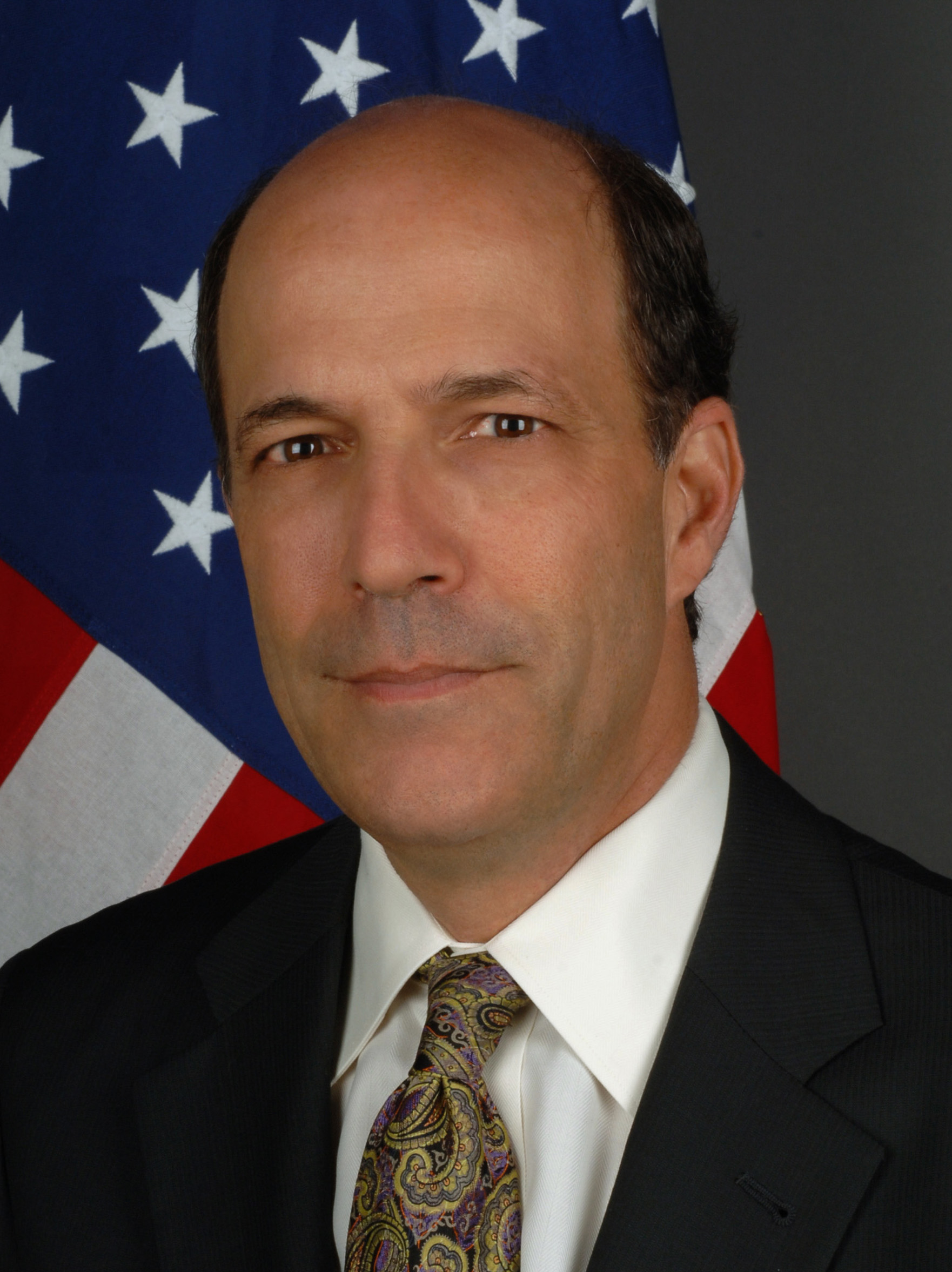

United States Ambassador to Japan
- In office August 20, 2009 – August 12, 2013
- President: Barack Obama
- Preceded by: Tom Schieffer
- Succeeded by: Caroline Kennedy

Personal details
- Born: John Victor Roos; February 14, 1955 (age 71) San Francisco, California, U.S.
- Party: Democratic
- Spouse: Susie Roos
- Children: 2
- Education: Stanford University (BA, JD)

John Victor Roos (born February 14, 1955) is an American businessman, attorney, and diplomat who served as United States Ambassador to Japan from 2009 to 2013. He is the Founding Partner of Geodesic Capital. Before accepting the ambassadorship from President Barack Obama, Roos was the CEO of Silicon Valley–based law firm of Wilson Sonsini Goodrich & Rosati.

== Early life and education ==
Roos was born and raised in San Francisco and graduated from Lowell High School. He attended Stanford University, where he graduated Phi Beta Kappa with Honors and Distinction, and Stanford Law School, earning his Juris Doctor in 1980 and achieving Order of the Coif.

== Career ==
=== Wilson Sonsini Goodrich & Rosati ===
Roos was hired by Wilson Sonsini Goodrich & Rosati in 1985, having previously worked for O'Melveny & Myers in the early 1980s. The company caught the tech startup wave and over the next 25 years became the premier legal firm in the Valley, growing from 50 employees to more than 1,500 worldwide.

=== Public service and political activity ===
While building his legal career, Roos participated in political activities and community service. He ran for and won a seat on the San Mateo-Foster City School District Board of Trustees in 1991 and again in 1995. He also served in various capacities at both Stanford University, where he served on the School of Education's Dean's Advisory Board and Stanford Law School—including as a member of the law school's Dean's Advisory Council. He was also elected to membership in the Stanford Associates for his long-standing volunteer service to the university. Roos also served as an honorary captain—alongside John Elway—for Stanford before the Cardinal's victory in the January 2011 Orange Bowl.

Roos supported Democrats including Walter Mondale, Bill Bradley, John Kerry, and Barack Obama, for whom he co-chaired the California financing operation.."

=== Ambassadorship ===
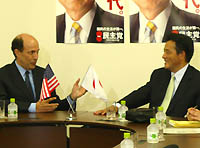
Roos with Foreign Minister Katsuya Okada

In May 2009 Obama named Roos to replace the departing Tom Schieffer as United States Ambassador to Japan.

On August 7, 2009, the U.S. Senate confirmed Roos by unanimous consent. On August 16, 2009, Roos was formally sworn in as the new ambassador. Three days later he and his family arrived in Japan and on August 20 he presented his credentials to Emperor Akihito.

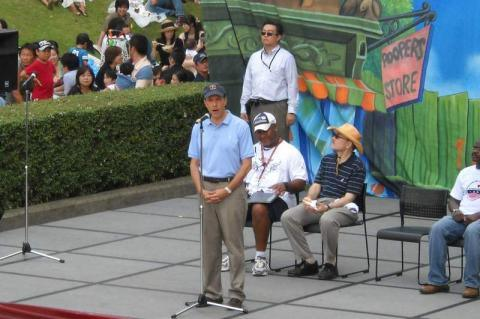
John · V · Roos U.S. Ambassador to greet speech at the Friendship Day at residence of Embassy in Tokyo(2010)

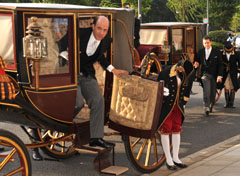
In Tokyo Imperial Palace

Ambassador Roos' tenure in Japan coincided with a historic period in U.S.–Japan relations. Shortly after his arrival, the Democratic Party of Japan assumed power, the first real party transition in the Japanese government in 50 years. Roos played a key role in managing the relationship through that transition, as well as President Obama's rebalance to Asia, placing even more importance on the U.S.-Japan Alliance as the cornerstone of peace and security in the region. In addition to addressing the security, economic, and global challenges that Japan and the United States face, Roos provided a specific focus on areas of cooperation that include people to people connections, innovation, and entrepreneurship, and trade issues, including Japan's interest in joining the Trans-Pacific Partnership. He also worked closely with Japan on issues related to the Hague Convention and handling of International Parent-Child Abduction cases, ultimately resulting in Japan's joining in 2014. During his time in Japan, Ambassador Roos built relationships and established a rich and active dialogue with government leaders, business leaders, media and students over the course of his travels across all 47 of Japan's prefectures.

On August 6, 2010, Roos attended the peace memorial ceremony in Hiroshima, the first US Ambassador to Japan to do so. Survivors of the U.S. atomic bombing welcomed his historic presence, where he offered a silent prayer for the victims of the bombing. His attendance was seen as an important step to advance President Obama's agenda to eliminate nuclear weapons. Roos returned to Hiroshima for the 2012 ceremony, and also became the first Ambassador to attend the Nagasaki memorial ceremony that year. His attendance was reported by all Japanese news media and widely praised.

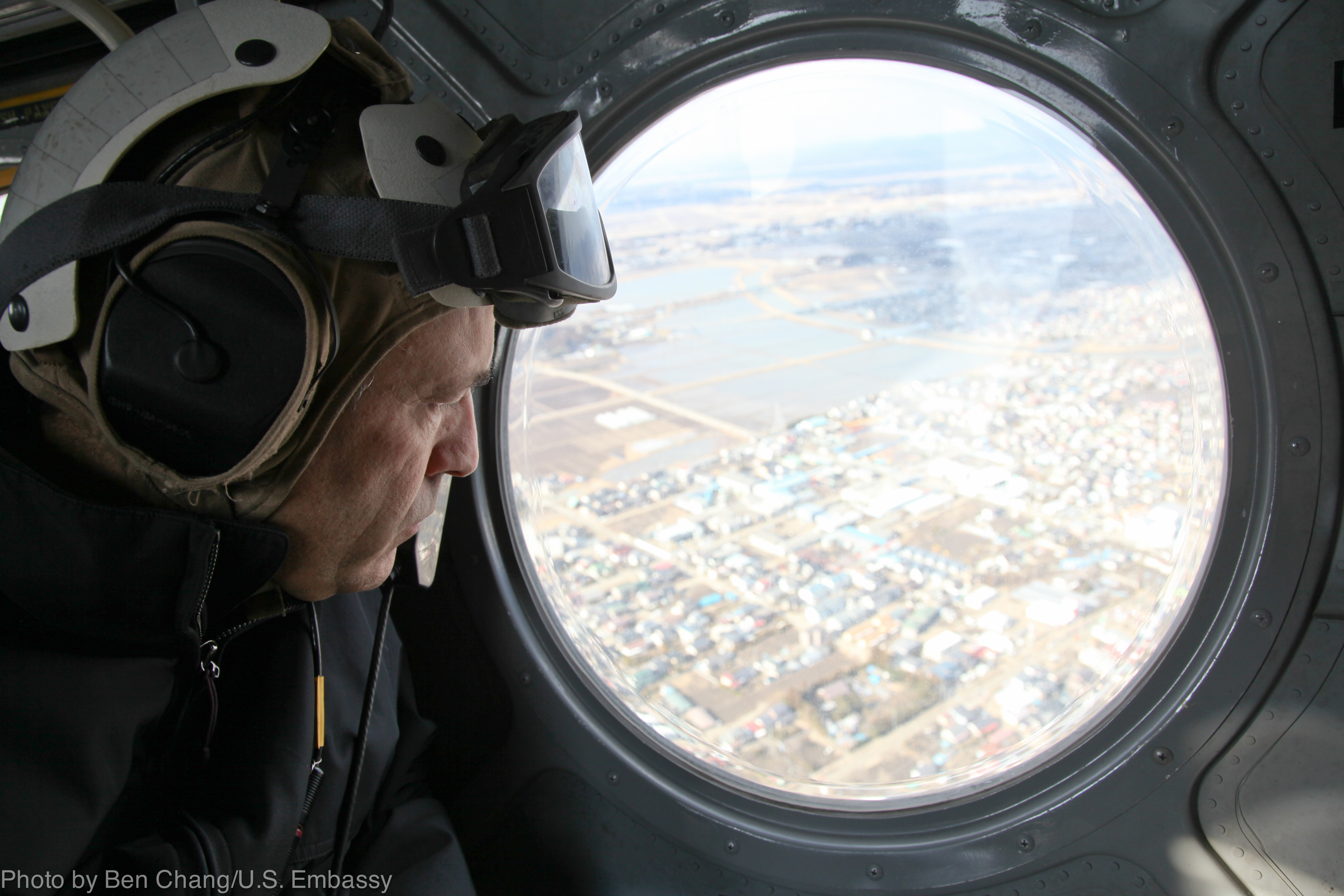
Amb. Roos views tsunami-hit area

Following the devastating 9.0 earthquake, tsunami, and nuclear crisis on March 11, 2011, Ambassador Roos led the American mission to support Japan's response to the multi-dimensional and unprecedented disaster. He made his first visit to Ishinomaki, one of the coast towns heavily damaged by the huge tsunami, just 12 days after the catastrophe, a visit he described as, "one of the most moving events of my life." Roos led the coordination of American relief efforts in what he called "the world's first megadisaster." An hour after the earthquake, Roos declared an emergency and cleared the way for Operation Tomodachi—which means "friend" in Japanese—a massive relief operation. Nearly 200 U.S. military ships and aircraft transported food, clothing, and supplies to those left homeless. He also led the U.S. Embassy's response to the nuclear crisis that ensued when a 50-foot wave hit the Fukushima Dai-ichi nuclear power plant. The disaster was intensified by the limited information available during its initial hours. Roos led the U.S. government's communication, and he used his Twitter feed to assure that the 155,000 Americans living in Japan received timely information about the disaster. Japanese public support of the United States reached historic highs (85% favorability) in the wake of the U.S. response to the disaster.

Roos also led the creation of the TOMODACHI Initiative in the wake of the U.S. relief efforts, after traveling throughout the Tohoku region that had been hit by the earthquake and tsunami and hearing from the mayor of one hard hit town, Rikuzentakata, that what the United States could really do to help recovery was "give hope to our young people." From this suggestion, the Ambassador launched the TOMODACHI Initiative. The initiative is a public-private partnership with the U.S.-Japan Council, a Washington DC–based organization, to invest in Japan's next generation of leaders. The Initiative represents a path-breaking paradigm in U.S. public diplomacy, in which government joins forces with private enterprises and organizations to achieve mutually beneficial, strategic goals. TOMODACHI provides young Japanese and Americans with opportunities to study, live, and work in each other's countries, thereby ensuring a thriving bilateral partnership into the foreseeable future. Roos marshaled assistance from a large number of high-profile celebrities to support the cause, including Lady Gaga, Tom Cruise, Will Smith, Cal Ripken, and will.i.am. Roos also has leveraged his popular Twitter account (over 55,000 followers, making him the most-followed U.S. Ambassador anywhere outside the United States at the time) to share information and generate excitement. As of the end of 2016, TOMODACHI has impacted the lives of more than 5,700 young people in the United States and Japan through cultural exchanges and leadership training. In 2016 alone, more than 1,000 people participated in 47 programs. More than 36,000 people have been involved in TOMODACHI programs and events in the United States and Japan. Roos remains active supporting TOMODACHI even following his Ambassadorship.

In August 2013, Roos' term concluded. He was replaced by Caroline Kennedy.

==== Recognition during Ambassadorship ====
The State Department awarded Ambassador Roos the 2011 Sue M. Cobb Award for Exemplary Diplomatic Service for the "tireless and effective leadership he displayed during the unprecedented disaster," an honor the Ambassador credited to the extraordinary dedication shown by U.S. Embassy employees in the aftermath of the March 11 disasters.

Ambassador Roos' work with the TOMODACHI Initiative was recognized with the Special Gold Standard Award for Public Affairs Excellence in December 2012,

On September 22, 2014, Ambassador Roos was also awarded the Distinguished Public Service Award by Secretary of the Navy Ray Mabus for "his relentless efforts to forge a deeper bilateral security relationship between Japan and the United States," his "dynamic and steadfast leadership during Operation Tomodachi [that] paved the way for nearly 200 American ships and aircraft to transport essential relief supplies and equipment to the thousands left homeless after the March 2011 Tohoku earthquake and tsunami."

=== Founding Partner, Geodesic Capital ===
John Roos is the Founding Partner, Geodesic Capital, which supports U.S.-based entrepreneurs building transformative growth stage technology companies.

=== Boards, Advisory Roles, and Awards ===
Roos is also a senior advisor at Centerview Partners, a mergers & acquisitions advisory firm. He is a member of the board of directors at Salesforce. and an advisor to the Toyota Research Institute. He additionally serves on the board of directors of The Maureen and Mike Mansfield Foundation. Roos also remains active supporting TOMODACHI. In 2022, he received the Grand Cordon of the Order of the Rising Sun

== Personal life ==
Roos is married to his wife Susie, and has two children, Lauren and David. Susie is a former labor attorney who serves as Chief Administration Officer at Geodesic Capital.

Diplomatic posts
Preceded by Tom Schieffer	United States Ambassador to Japan; 2009–2013	Succeeded by Caroline Kennedy
