= Peter Keisler =

American lawyer (born 1960)

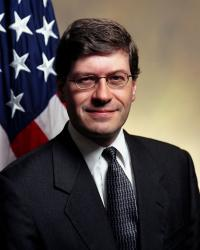

United States Attorney General
- Acting
- In office September 18, 2007 – November 9, 2007
- President: George W. Bush
- Deputy: Craig S. Morford (acting)
- Preceded by: Paul Clement (acting)
- Succeeded by: Michael Mukasey

United States Assistant Attorney General for the Civil Division
- In office July 1, 2003 – September 18, 2007
- President: George W. Bush
- Preceded by: Robert McCallum Jr.
- Succeeded by: Gregory Katsas

United States Associate Attorney General
- Acting
- In office October 7, 2002 – March 28, 2003
- President: George W. Bush
- Preceded by: Jay Stephens
- Succeeded by: Robert McCallum Jr.

Associate Counsel to the President
- In office June 5, 1987 – February 15, 1988
- President: Ronald Reagan
- Succeeded by: Michael J. Astrue

Personal details
- Born: October 13, 1960 (age 66) Hempstead, New York, U.S.
- Party: Republican
- Education: Yale University (BA, JD)

Peter Douglas Keisler (born October 13, 1960) is an American lawyer who served as Assistant Attorney General for the U.S. Department of Justice Civil Division from 2003 to 2007, and, upon the resignation of Alberto Gonzales, as Acting Attorney General of the United States from September to November in 2007. His 2006 nomination by President George W. Bush to the U.S. Court of Appeals for the District of Columbia Circuit became embroiled in partisan controversy. In 1982, while at Yale Law School, he was a co-founder of the Federalist Society. He is a partner at the law firm Sidley Austin in Washington, D.C.

== Education ==
Keisler was born in Hempstead, New York. A 1977 graduate from George W. Hewlett High School in Long Island, he went to Yale University both for undergraduate and law school. As an undergraduate, Keisler was the Speaker of Yale Political Union, a debate society, and the Chairman of one of its seven parties, the Party of the Right. He was also a member of the secret society for conservative students, the Calliopean Society. He graduated magna cum laude from Yale College in 1981 and then entered Yale Law School. In 1982, he helped to co-found the Federalist Society, a conservative think tank. He received his J.D. in 1985.

== White House career ==
After law school, Keisler clerked for Judge Robert Bork on the D.C. Circuit from 1985 to 1986. After this clerkship, he joined President Ronald Regan's White House Counsel's office as an Assistant Counsel. He was promoted to Associate Counsel in 1987. While there, he worked on the failed Supreme Court nomination of his former boss, Robert Bork, serving as Bork's "aide-de-camp" through the Senate hearings. Following this, Keisler also worked on the successful Supreme Court nomination of Anthony Kennedy. Afterward, Keisler served as a clerk for Justice Kennedy in 1988. One of his fellow clerks during that year was Miguel Estrada, also a conservative, whose nomination to the D.C. Circuit would be controversially filibustered by the Democrats in 2003.

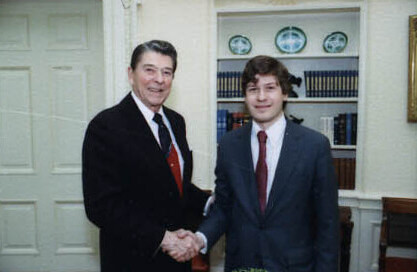
Keisler with President Ronald Reagan in 1988

After finishing his Supreme Court clerkship, Keisler became a partner in the Washington, D.C. office of the law firm Sidley Austin. He specialized in general and appellate litigation and telecommunications law, and argued before the U.S. Supreme Court and numerous federal Courts of Appeals. In 2002, he left his job in order to join the Department of Justice as the Principal Deputy Associate Attorney General.

Peter Keisler was sworn in as the Civil Division's Assistant Attorney General on July 1, 2003. Keisler was involved in defending the Bush Administration's policies in the Global War on Terror. He has also represented the government in defense of laws protecting access to abortion clinics and imposing requirements on telemarketing companies.

In probably the most well-known case he handled, Keisler argued on behalf of the government in Hamdan v. Rumsfeld in the D.C. Circuit in 2004 and participated in both the case's Appellate (2005) and Supreme Court (2006) briefs. In addition, he personally led the team that responded to a legal appeal by Sabin Willett, the lawyer for the seventeen remaining Uyghur captives in Guantanamo, that tested the use of a provision of the Detainee Treatment Act in terms of whether or not captives could challenge the rulings of their Combatant Status Review Tribunals.

On September 6, 2007, Keisler announced his resignation from the Department of Justice in order to "spend time with his family." On September 17, 2007, President George W. Bush announced that Keisler had agreed to remain at the Department of Justice as Acting Attorney General until the Senate confirmation of a new Attorney General; Bush also announced the nomination of Michael Mukasey for Attorney General at the same time.

Bush had previously stated his intention for the position of Acting Attorney General to be filled by then-Solicitor General Paul Clement, but later changed his mind and went with Keisler instead. This decision was made in part on the basis that Republicans considered Keisler to be what they called a "movement conservative". As Scott Horton explained in an article for Harper's, "What distinguishes 'movement conservatives' from others is their willingness to use all the institutions of government aggressively to accomplish the movement's agenda. And the movement's agenda and the party's agenda are essentially the same. [...] It seems clear that Keisler was a deeply committed partisan 'movement conservative,' deeply engaged in tactical planning to elect other 'movement conservatives,' to secure and promote their control of the institutions of government in all branches."

== Nomination to U.S. Court of Appeals for the Fourth Circuit ==
In 2001, President George W. Bush nominated Keisler, a resident of Bethesda, Maryland and a practising lawyer in Washington, D.C., for seat on the U.S. Court of Appeals for the Fourth Circuit, which had traditionally gone to a Maryland resident. However Maryland's two Democratic senators, Paul Sarbanes and Barbara Mikulski, successfully blocked the nomination on the grounds that, although Keisler was a resident of the state, he was not licensed to practice law there.

Keisler was later nominated for a position on the D.C. Circuit Court of Appeals on June 29, 2006 by President George W. Bush to fill a seat vacated by John Roberts, who had just become Chief Justice on the Supreme Court. At the time, the 109th Senate was controlled by the Republican Party. On August 1, 2006, he received a hearing before the Senate Judiciary Committee. On September 29, 2006 the Senate returned the nomination to the President without acting on it, a day prior to adjourning for the 2006 midterm elections.

After the 2006 elections (in which the Democrats reclaimed control of the Senate), President Bush renominated Keisler again on November 15, 2006. The Senate returned the nomination to Bush on December 9, without acting on it, before the 109th Congress's final adjournment. President Bush renominated Keisler on January 9, 2007 for consideration by the Senate during the 110th Congress. The Democratic leadership of the Senate Judiciary Committee, however, refused to act on the nomination.

It was reported at the time that the Democrats in the Senate opposed Keisler for four reasons; first, he was a co-founder of the Federalist Society, a conservative legal group which many Democrats saw as seeking to control the federal judiciary, and had been on its board of directors from 1983 until 2000; second was his having clerked for Robert Bork; third was his having been instrumental in defending some of the most controversial of Bush's policies concerning the "War on Terror"; and fourth was their concern that Keisler was a possible future Republican contender for the Supreme Court.

== Current life ==
On March 18, 2008, it was announced that Keisler would be returning to his former position as a partner of Sidley Austin as a global coordinator of the firm's appellate practice in its Washington, D.C. office. On October 21, 2008, Sidley Austin announced that Keisler would be joining the firm's Executive Committee, which exercises general authority over the affairs of the firm.

In 2018, Keisler was a founding member of The Society for the Rule of Law (known as Checks and Balances until 2023), a group of conservative-libertarian, anti-Trump attorneys.

In 2025, Keisler joined the Washington Litigation Group, a boutique non profit law firm which focuses on challenging Trump's executive orders and providing pro bono legal services to targets of criminal and congressional investigations.

Keisler and his wife, Susan, have three children; Sydelle, Alexander, and Philip. Philip formerly played ultimate frisbee for Washington University in St. Louis.

== See also ==
- List of law clerks for the first seat of the Supreme Court of the United States
- George W. Bush judicial appointment controversies
- George W. Bush Supreme Court candidates

Legal offices
Preceded by Jay Stephens	United States Associate Attorney General; Acting; 2002–2003	Succeeded by Robert McCallum
Preceded by Robert McCallum Jr.	United States Assistant Attorney General for the Civil Division; 2003–2007	Succeeded by Gregory Katsas
Preceded by Paul Clement; Acting	United States Attorney General; Acting; 2007	Succeeded by Michael Mukasey
