= Holmes Baldridge =

American attorney

10th United States Assistant Attorney General for the Claims Division
- In office April 3, 1951 – January 20, 1953
- President: Harry S. Truman
- Preceded by: H. Graham Morison
- Succeeded by: Warren E. Burger

Personal details
- Born: Albert Holmes Baldridge; September 27, 1902; Connerville, Oklahoma, U.S.
- Died: June 23, 1987 (aged 84); Denver, Colorado, U.S.
- Resting place: Rose Hill Burial Park (Oklahoma City, Oklahoma)
- Political party: Democratic
- Education: University of Oklahoma; University of Nebraska College of Law
- Profession: Attorney

Holmes Baldridge (September 27, 1902 – June 23, 1987) was an American attorney who served as the United States Assistant Attorney General for the Claims Division from 1951 to 1953.

Baldridge was born in Connerville, Oklahoma (then Indian Territory) on September 27, 1902, the son of Albert Sidney and Ripple (Holmes) Baldridge. He graduated from Oklahoma City's Central High School in 1921. He received his Bachelor of Arts degree from the University of Oklahoma in 1925, and received his LL.B. degree from the University of Nebraska College of Law in 1931.

After graduating from the University of Oklahoma, Baldridge taught speech at the University of Oregon for two years. After completing law school and attaining admission to the bar, he served as general counsel for the Oklahoma Corporation Commission from 1933 to 1936. From 1935 to 1938, Baldridge was counsel for the Federal Communications Commission, and was responsible for a nationwide investigation into the telephone industry. He then moved to the Department of Justice as special assistant to the Attorney General, and served in several other positions before becoming head of the Claims Division.

Baldridge died in Denver, Colorado on June 23, 1987. He was buried at Rose Hill Burial Park in Oklahoma City. Baldridge was survived by his wife Anne and son Cates.
