= Gregory G. Katsas =

American federal judge (born 1964)

Greg Katsas
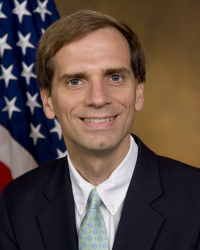
- Official portrait, 2008

Judge of the United States Court of Appeals for the District of Columbia Circuit
- Incumbent
- Assumed office December 8, 2017
- Appointed by: Donald Trump
- Preceded by: Janice Rogers Brown

United States Assistant Attorney General for the Civil Division
- In office July 2008 – January 20, 2009
- President: George W. Bush
- Preceded by: Peter Keisler
- Succeeded by: Tony West

United States Associate Attorney General
- Acting
- In office June 22, 2007 – April 2008
- President: George W. Bush
- Preceded by: William W. Mercer (acting)
- Succeeded by: Kevin O'Connor

Personal details
- Born: Gregory George Katsas; August 6, 1964 (age 62) Boston, Massachusetts, U.S.
- Party: Republican
- Education: Princeton University (BA); Harvard University (JD)

Gregory George Katsas (born August 6, 1964) is an American lawyer and jurist serving as a United States circuit judge of the United States Court of Appeals for the District of Columbia Circuit. He was appointed in 2017 by President Donald Trump. Before his appointment to the bench, Katsas served as Deputy White House Counsel in the first Trump administration, as an assistant attorney general in the United States Department of Justice, and as a partner at the law firm Jones Day.

== Early life and education ==
Katsas was born on August 6, 1964, in Boston, Massachusetts. His parents were Greek immigrants. Katsas graduated from Princeton University in 1986 with a Bachelor of Arts, cum laude, in philosophy. He then attended Harvard Law School, where he was an executive editor of the Harvard Law Review and an editor of the Harvard Journal of Law and Public Policy. He graduated in 1989 with a Juris Doctor, cum laude.

== Career ==
After law school, Katsas was a law clerk to Judge Edward R. Becker of the United States Court of Appeals for the Third Circuit from 1989 to 1990. From 1990 to 1991, Katsas clerked for Clarence Thomas, who was then a judge of the District of Columbia Circuit. After President George H. W. Bush appointed Thomas to the United States Supreme Court in 1991, Katsas again clerked for Thomas from 1991 to 1992.

Katsas then entered private practice at the Washington, D.C., office of the law firm Jones Day, where he specialized in civil and appellate litigation. He argued more than 75 appeals, including three cases in the U.S. Supreme Court. He was at Jones Day from 1992 to 2001, becoming a partner in 1999.

From 2001 to 2009, Katsas served in various positions within the United States Department of Justice, including assistant attorney general for the Civil Division and Acting associate attorney general. Katsas returned to Jones Day from 2009 to 2017. From January to December 2017, Katsas served as deputy White House counsel.

=== Federal judicial service ===
On September 7, 2017, President Donald Trump nominated Katsas to serve as a United States circuit judge of the United States Court of Appeals for the District of Columbia Circuit, to the seat vacated by Judge Janice Rogers Brown, who retired on August 31, 2017.

On October 17, 2017, a hearing on his nomination was held before the Senate Judiciary Committee. On November 9, 2017, his nomination was reported out of committee by an 11–9 vote.

On November 27, 2017, the United States Senate invoked cloture on his nomination by a 52–48 vote. On November 28, 2017, by a party line vote except for John Neely Kennedy R-LA and Joe Manchin D-WV, with Bob Corker and John McCain absent, Katsas was confirmed by a 50–48 vote. He received his judicial commission on December 8, 2017.

He is currently considered the top “feeder” judge, sending the highest number of his law clerks to clerk on the Supreme Court since his appointment to the bench in 2018. Katsas “has sent at least 18 of his law clerks to the high court since the October 2019 term,” according to National Law Journal.

=== Notable cases ===
- In 2017, Katsas recused himself from matters regarding the Mueller probe on which he personally worked, but said he would consider the facts of a case before making a decision.
- On September 9, 2020, President Trump included him on a list of his potential nominees to the Supreme Court. He has been suggested as a potential nominee in a second Trump administration.
- On July 6, 2021, Judge Katsas gave the tie-breaking 2–1 vote that overturned the FDA's ban on GEDs used predominantly by the Judge Rotenberg Center on disabled patients in Canton, MA.
- On April 7, 2023, Katsas authored a dissent in Fischer v. United States, a case interpreting whether January 6 participants could be charged under 18 U.S.C. § 1512(c), a provision of the Sarbanes–Oxley Act enacted to combat corporate fraud that penalizes anyone who “otherwise obstructs, influences, or impedes any official proceeding.” Rejecting the government's argument, Katsas argued that interpreting “the structure and history of section 1512, and with decades of precedent applying section 1512(c) only to acts that affect the integrity or availability of evidence” suggest that the government's reading is “implausibly broad and unconstitutional in a significant number of its applications.”

== Memberships ==
He is a member of the Federalist Society, and also a member of the American Academy of Appellate Lawyers.

== Awards ==
In 2009, he was awarded the Edmund Randolph award for outstanding service, the highest award bestowed by the United States Department of Justice.

== Scholarly works ==
- Katsas, Gregory G. (2015). "Targeted Drone Killings: Legal Justifications Under the Bush and Obama Administrations" (PDF). Harvard Journal of Law & Public Policy. 38 (1): 251–60.

== See also ==
- List of law clerks for the tenth seat of the Supreme Court of the United States
- Donald Trump Supreme Court candidates

Legal offices
Preceded by William W. Mercer; Acting	United States Associate Attorney General; Acting; 2007–2008	Succeeded by Kevin J. O'Connor
Preceded by Peter Keisler	United States Assistant Attorney General for the Civil Division; 2008–2009	Succeeded by Tony West
Preceded by Janice Rogers Brown	Judge of the United States Court of Appeals for the District of Columbia Circuit; 2017–present	Incumbent
