= Chad Readler =

American judge (born 1972)

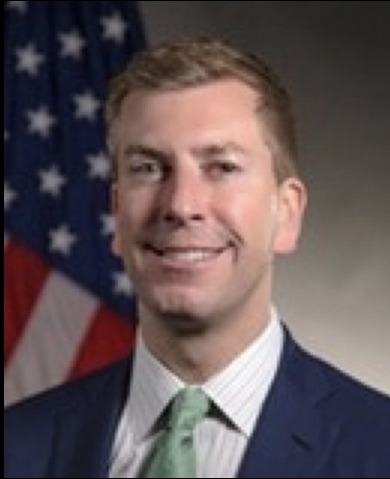

Judge of the United States Court of Appeals for the Sixth Circuit
- Incumbent
- Assumed office March 7, 2019
- Appointed by: Donald Trump
- Preceded by: Deborah L. Cook

United States Assistant Attorney General for the Civil Division
- Acting
- In office December 11, 2017 – September 4, 2018
- President: Donald Trump
- Preceded by: Himself
- Succeeded by: Jody Hunt
- In office January 30, 2017 – November 16, 2017
- President: Donald Trump
- Preceded by: Benjamin C. Mizer (acting)
- Succeeded by: Himself

Personal details
- Born: Chad Andrew Readler; 1972 (age 53–54) Pontiac, Michigan, U.S.
- Party: Republican
- Education: University of Michigan (BA, JD)

Chad Andrew Readler (RAYD-ler; born 1972) is an American lawyer and adjunct professor who serves as a United States circuit judge of the United States Court of Appeals for the Sixth Circuit. Prior to his appointment, he was a principal deputy and former acting assistant attorney general for the Civil Division of the United States Department of Justice. He was also a partner at the law firm Jones Day.

== Education ==
Readler graduated from the University of Michigan in 1994. He attended the Ohio State University Moritz College of Law for one year, then transferred to the University of Michigan Law School, where he was an editor of the University of Michigan Journal of Law Reform. He graduated in 1997 with a Juris Doctor degree cum laude.

== Legal career ==
After graduating from law school, Readler served as a law clerk for Judge Alan Eugene Norris of the Sixth Circuit from 1997 to 1998. From 1998 to 2017, Reader was in private practice at the law firm Jones Day in its Columbus, Ohio, office, becoming a partner in 2007 in the firm's Issues and Appeals practice. While at Jones Day, Readler represented the R. J. Reynolds Tobacco Company in challenging a Buffalo, New York, restriction prohibiting tobacco ads from appearing within 1,000 feet of schools, playgrounds, and day-care centers. He argued that the law infringed upon the Company's First Amendment right to advertise.

He also successfully argued before the Supreme Court of the United States in McQuiggin v. Perkins on behalf of a pro bono client claiming actual innocence. His other pro bono representations include representing capital defendants before the United States Court of Appeals for the Tenth Circuit and the Supreme Court of Ohio, representing defendants sentenced to life in prison before the Sixth Circuit, and challenging dismissals of claims filed by pro se litigants. While at Jones Day, Readler traveled to Nairobi with Lawyers Without Borders to train Kenyan lawyers in prosecuting domestic violence cases, and he was also a recipient of the American Marshall Memorial Fellowship awarded by the German Marshall Fund of the United States.

Prior to becoming a judge, Readler served as Acting United States Assistant Attorney General for the Civil Division from January 2017 to September 2018. In that role, Readler led and supervised the Department of Justice's largest litigating division and actively briefed and argued several cases on behalf of the United States in federal courts across the country.

He was involved in some of the most high-profile cases in the first Trump administration. As Acting U.S. Assistant Attorney General, Readler defended the Trump administration's attempt to add a citizenship question on the 2020 Census, based on the allegation that the Department of Justice had requested the Department of Commerce to add the question. In a fractured majority, the Supreme Court later determined that false, "ruling that the justification that the government offered at the time for including the citizenship question was just a pretext."

== Federal judicial service ==
On June 7, 2018, President Donald Trump announced his intent to nominate Readler to serve as a United States Circuit Judge of the United States Court of Appeals for the Sixth Circuit. On June 18, 2018, his nomination was sent to the Senate. President Trump nominated Readler to the seat being vacated by Judge Deborah L. Cook, who previously announced her intention to assume senior status on a date to be determined. In June 2018, U.S. Senator Sherrod Brown said he did not plan to return a blue slip for Readler's nomination, while U.S. Senator Rob Portman said he planned to support Readler's nomination. On October 10, 2018, a hearing on his nomination was held before the Senate Judiciary Committee.

During his confirmation hearing, Democrats criticized Readler for having supported a Republican lawsuit aimed at dismantling the Affordable Care Act, including its protections for individuals with pre-existing conditions.

On January 3, 2019, his nomination was returned to the President under Rule XXXI, Paragraph 6 of the United States Senate. He was renominated on January 23, 2019. On February 7, 2019, his nomination was reported out of committee by a 12–10 vote. On March 5, 2019, the Senate invoked cloture on his nomination by a 53–45 vote. On March 6, 2019, his nomination was confirmed by a 52–47 vote. He received his judicial commission on March 7, 2019.

Readler currently teaches a Presidential Powers Seminar at the University of Michigan Law School and the Moritz College of Law at The Ohio State University.

Notable cases as a circuit court judge

- In Davenport v. MacLaren, 975 F.3d 537 (6th Cir. 2020), a panel of the Sixth Circuit vacated the first-degree murder conviction of Earl Davenport, a man accused of strangling Annette White. Judge Readler dissented, arguing that the U.S. Supreme Court's decision in Brecht v. Abrahamson, 507 U.S. 619 (1993), and AEDPA "set forth independent tests, and that both must be satisfied before habeas relief becomes permissible." The Sixth Circuit voted 8 to 7 against rehearing the case en banc. The U.S. Supreme Court then granted certiorari in the case and ruled that the Sixth Circuit erred, citing Judge Readler's dissenting opinion.
- In United States v. Wooden, 945 F.3d 498 (6th Cir. 2019), Judge Readler authored a majority opinion holding that ACCA's occasions clause, which can trigger a mandatory minimum prison sentence, is satisfied whenever a criminal defendant commits certain crimes "at different moments in time." The U.S. Supreme Court granted certiorari and reversed, holding that "[c]onvictions arising from a single episode, in the way Wooden's did, can count only once under ACCA."

== Memberships ==
Readler is a member of the Federalist Society.

== See also ==
- Donald Trump judicial appointment controversies

Legal offices
Preceded by Benjamin C. Mizer; Acting	United States Assistant Attorney General for the Civil Division; Acting; 2017–2018	Succeeded by Jody Hunt
Preceded by Deborah L. Cook	Judge of the United States Court of Appeals for the Sixth Circuit; 2019–present	Incumbent
