= Frank W. Hunger =

American attorney

Frank Hunger

United States Assistant Attorney General for the Civil Division
- In office July 1, 1993 – January 31, 1999
- President: Bill Clinton
- Preceded by: Stuart M. Gerson
- Succeeded by: David W. Ogden

Personal details
- Born: July 22, 1936 (age 89) Winona, Mississippi, U.S.
- Party: Democratic
- Spouse: Nancy Gore (m. 1966; died 1984)
- Education: University of Mississippi (BBA); Duke University (LLB)

Frank Watson Hunger (born July 22, 1936) is an American attorney who served as the United States Assistant Attorney General for the Civil Division from 1993 to 1999. The son-in-law of Al Gore Sr. and brother-in-law of Al Gore during his marriage to Nancy Gore, Hunger was considered one of Gore's closest confidantes and friends.

== Biography ==
Hunger was born in Winona, Mississippi on July 22, 1936. Hunger received a Bachelor of Business Administration (B.B.A.) degree from the University of Mississippi and his LL.B. from the Duke University School of Law.
