= Raymond C. Fisher =

American judge (1939–2020)

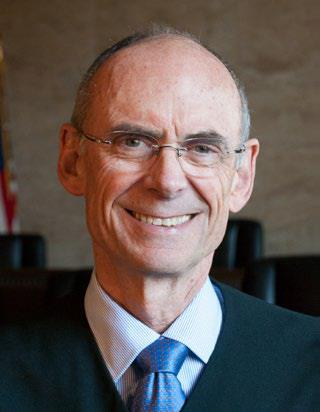
- Fisher in 2014

Senior Judge of the United States Court of Appeals for the Ninth Circuit
- In office March 31, 2013 – February 29, 2020

Judge of the United States Court of Appeals for the Ninth Circuit
- In office October 12, 1999 – March 31, 2013
- Appointed by: Bill Clinton
- Preceded by: David R. Thompson
- Succeeded by: Michelle Friedland

United States Associate Attorney General
- In office 1997–1998
- President: Bill Clinton
- Preceded by: John Schmidt
- Succeeded by: Daniel Marcus

Personal details
- Born: Raymond Corley Fisher; July 12, 1939 Oakland, California
- Died: February 29, 2020 (aged 80) Sherman Oaks, California
- Party: Democratic
- Education: University of California, Santa Barbara (BA); Stanford University (LLB)

Raymond Corley Fisher (July 12, 1939 – February 29, 2020) was a United States circuit judge of the United States Court of Appeals for the Ninth Circuit.

== Early life and education ==
Fisher attended University High School, earned his Bachelor of Arts degree at the University of California at Santa Barbara in 1961, and his Bachelor of Laws from Stanford Law School in 1966, where he was president of the Stanford Law Review. One of his professors at Stanford was Joseph Tyree Sneed III, who would later be one of Fisher's colleagues on the Ninth Circuit. He clerked for Judge J. Skelly Wright of the United States Court of Appeals for the District of Columbia Circuit from 1966 to 1967. He then clerked for Justice William J. Brennan Jr. of the United States Supreme Court from 1967 to 1968.

== Career ==
Fisher was in private practice from 1968 to 1997 in Los Angeles, California. He also served as a special assistant to California Governor Jerry Brown in 1975. He was a member of the Los Angeles City Civil Service Commission from 1984 to 1989 and was deputy general counsel to the Independent Commission on the Los Angeles Police Department in 1990. Fisher then served as president of the Los Angeles Police Commission from 1995 to 1997 and Associate Attorney General from 1997 to 1999.

=== Federal judicial service ===
Fisher was nominated by President Bill Clinton for the seat vacated by Judge David R. Thompson on the United States Court of Appeals for the Ninth Circuit on March 15, 1999. He was confirmed by the United States Senate in a 69–29 vote on October 5, 1999. He received his commission on October 12, 1999.

In 2004, Fisher granted the habeas corpus petition of a death row inmate whose jury had considered invalid sentencing factors, which the Supreme Court of the United States then reversed, by a vote of 5-4. In 2006, Judge Fisher dissented when the circuit upheld a county’s practice of requiring home searches of welfare recipients. He took senior status on March 31, 2013. Fisher died on February 29, 2020.

== See also ==
- List of law clerks for the third seat of the Supreme Court of the United States
- United States v. Camacho

Legal offices
Preceded by John Schmidt	United States Associate Attorney General; 1997–1999	Succeeded by Daniel Marcus
Preceded by David R. Thompson	Judge of the United States Court of Appeals for the Ninth Circuit; 1999–2013	Succeeded by Michelle Friedland
