= William Baer (lawyer) =

American lawyer (born 1950)

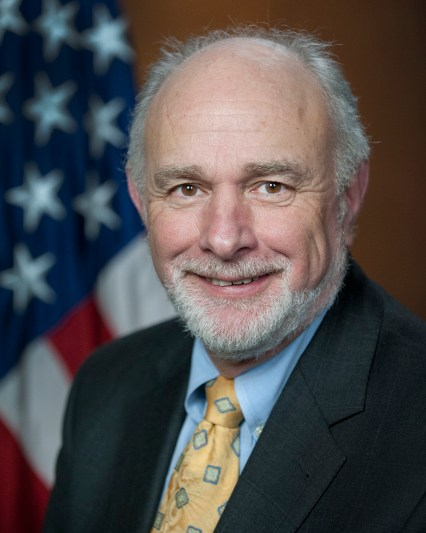

United States Associate Attorney General
- Acting
- In office April 17, 2016 – January 20, 2017
- President: Barack Obama
- Preceded by: Stuart F. Delery (acting)
- Succeeded by: Jesse Panuccio (acting)

United States Assistant Attorney General for the Antitrust Division
- In office January 2013 – April 2016
- President: Barack Obama
- Preceded by: Christine A. Varney
- Succeeded by: Makan Delrahim

Personal details
- Born: William Joseph Baer; May 31, 1950 (age 75) Baraboo, Wisconsin, U.S.
- Education: Lawrence University (BA); Stanford University (JD)

William Joseph Baer (born May 31, 1950) is an American lawyer who served as the Assistant Attorney General for the United States Department of Justice Antitrust Division under the administration of President Barack Obama. He is a partner at the American law firm Arnold & Porter, where he works in antitrust law and white collar defense. Since January 2020, Baer has been a visiting fellow in Governance Studies at the Brookings Institution.

== Early life and education ==
Baer was born on May 31, 1950, in Baraboo, Wisconsin. He graduated from Lawrence University in 1972 and from Stanford Law School in 1975, where he was a senior articles editor of the Stanford Law Review.

== Legal career ==
Upon graduating law school in 1975, Baer took a job with the Federal Trade Commission (FTC) where he held positions as Assistant General Counsel and Director of Congressional Relations; Attorney Advisor to the Chairman; Assistant to the Director, Bureau of Consumer Protection; and Trial Attorney, Bureau of Consumer Protection.

=== Arnold & Porter ===
Baer left the FTC in 1980 to join the law firm Arnold & Porter. He was an associate at the firm from 1980 until 1984, when he became a partner. He remained a partner at Arnold & Porter until 1995, and among his higher-profile cases was successfully defending General Electric against price-fixing accusations in the 1990s. In 1995, Baer left Arnold & Porter to rejoin the FTC as the director of its Bureau of Competition. Baer left the FTC in October 1999.

In January 2000, Baer returned to Arnold & Porter as a partner. In his practice, he represented a broad range of firms in U.S. and cartel investigations, mergers and acquisitions reviews, and antitrust litigation. During his work at Arnold & Porter, Baer's clientele included Monsanto, General Electric, Intel, Micron Technology, and Cisco Systems.

Baer retired from the practice in 2012. However, per his disclosure when he joined the Department of Justice in 2012, Baer will continue to receive payments from the firm until 2025 as part of his retirement package.

=== Assistant Attorney General ===
On February 6, 2012, President Obama nominated Baer to serve as Assistant Attorney General for the Antitrust Division, filling the slot vacated by Christine A. Varney. During his hearings before the United States Senate Committee on the Judiciary in July 2012, Baer told senators that he felt that the Antitrust Division had been "well run in recent years." However, his nomination stalled in the second half of 2012 after some Republican senators said they did not like something discovered in Baer's background check.

On September 20, 2012, Baer's nomination was voted out of committee to the full U.S. Senate in a 12–5 vote. On December 30, 2012, the full U.S. Senate confirmed Baer in a 64–26 vote, with all votes against him coming from Republicans.

The first case for Baer to oversee in June 2013 was a trial that the Division filed accusing book publishers of conspiring with Apple to fix the prices of e-books.<no ref name="nytimes1" /> The Justice Department contends that since the trial, the average price of best-selling e-books has dropped to about $6 from $12.99 before.

On March 1, 2016, Baer filed an Antitrust Division indictment against oilman Aubrey McClendon alleging conspiracy to fix bidding on freehold oil and natural gas leases. The following day, McClendon drove his vehicle at high speed into a bridge embankment in Oklahoma City and died instantly in what the police ruled an accidental death. On March 3, 2016, the Justice Department withdrew the charges.

=== Acting Associate Attorney General ===
On April 17, 2016, Baer became acting Associate Attorney General, a position he held until January 20, 2017.

== Post-government career ==
After leaving government, Baer returned to Arnold & Porter. Since January 2020, Baer has been a visiting fellow in Governance Studies at the Brookings Institution. In 2023, Baer testified in a hearing held by the Senate Committee on the Judiciary that assessed the relationship between pricing algorithms and anti-competitive conduct.

== Personal life ==
Baer is a resident of Bethesda, Maryland.
