= Jay B. Stephens =

American lawyer (born 1946)

United States Associate Attorney General
- In office 2001–2002
- President: George W. Bush
- Preceded by: Daniel Marcus
- Succeeded by: Peter Keisler (acting)

United States Attorney for the District of Columbia
- In office 1988–1993
- President: Ronald Reagan; George H. W. Bush
- Preceded by: Timothy J. Reardon III (acting)
- Succeeded by: J. Ramsey Johnson (acting)

Personal details
- Born: November 5, 1946 (age 79) Akron, Iowa, U.S.
- Party: Republican
- Education: Harvard University (BA, JD)

Jay B. Stephens (born November 5, 1946) is an American attorney who served as President George W. Bush's first Associate Attorney General.

== Biography ==
Stephens grew up on a livestock and grain farm in northwest Iowa. He graduated from Harvard College in 1968 and Harvard Law School in 1973. After law school, he spent a year as an associate at Wilmer, Cutler & Pickering and then served as an assistant special prosecutor on the Watergate prosecution team from 1974 to 1975. From 1976 to 1977, he was an associate general counsel at the Overseas Private Investment Corporation. He then spent four years as an Assistant United States Attorney in Washington, D.C., before moving to the Justice Department, where he served in various capacities from 1981 to 1986. In 1986, he was appointed Deputy White House Counsel.

In 1988, Stephens was nominated and confirmed as United States Attorney for the District of Columbia. He served in that position through the end of the George H. W. Bush administration, overseeing the beginning of the prosecution of Representative Dan Rostenkowski. On March 24, 1993, President Bill Clinton's new Attorney General, Janet Reno, demanded the resignation of all United States Attorneys; the Clinton administration is the first and only administration to do this in over 243 years. Stephens suggested Reno was attempting to impede the investigation of Rostenkowski, a Democrat, but the prosecution continued under his successors and Rostenkowski pled guilty in 1994. After resigning, Stephens became a partner in the D.C. office of Pillsbury, Madison & Sutro. From 1997 to 2001, he was a Corporate Vice President and Deputy General Counsel for Honeywell.

When George W. Bush became president, he nominated Stephens to be United States Associate Attorney General, and the Senate confirmed him on November 8, 2001. On September 27, 2002, he announced his resignation, effective October 7, to become Senior Vice President and General Counsel at Raytheon. He left Raytheon in 2015 and is currently of counsel at Kirkland & Ellis.
