= Brett Shumate =

American lawyer and government official

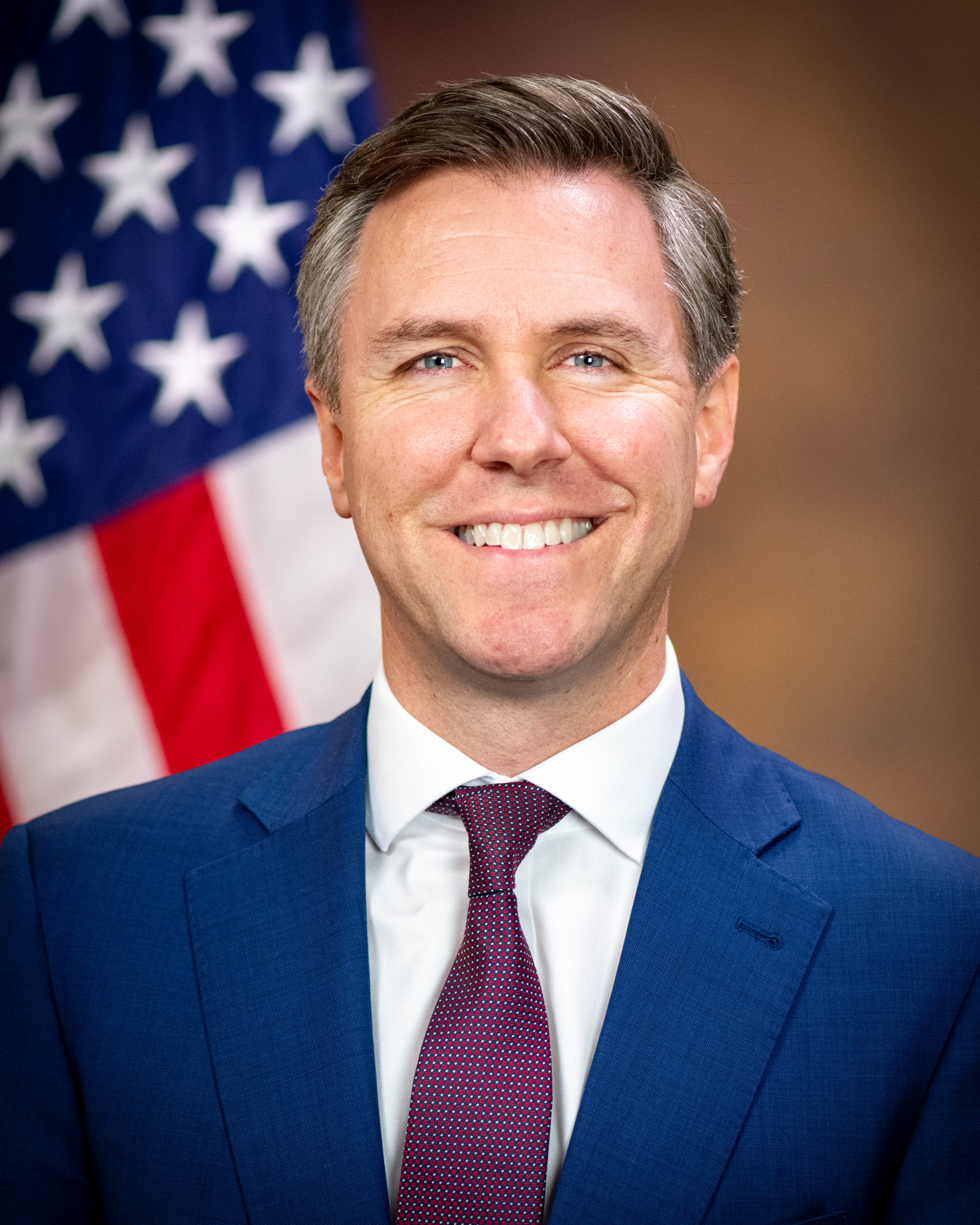
- Shumate in 2025

United States Assistant Attorney General for the Civil Division
- In office June 9, 2025 – November 9, 2026
- President: Donald Trump
- Preceded by: Yaakov M. Roth (acting)
- Succeeded by: Jonathan Guynn (acting)

Personal details
- Education: Furman University; Wake Forest University

Brett Shumate is an American lawyer who served as the assistant attorney general for the U.S. Department of Justice Civil Division from 2025 to 2026. He was previously a partner in the government regulation practice at Jones Day.

== Education ==
Shumate graduated magna cum laude from Furman University in 2003. He was elected to Phi Beta Kappa. In 2006, he completed a J.D. magna cum laude from Wake Forest University School of Law. Shumate was elected Order of the Coif and served as the executive editor of the Wake Forest Law Review. He was a federal law clerk for judge Edith Jones on the U.S. Court of Appeals for the Fifth Circuit.

== Career ==
Shumate was a senior litigator in the federal programs branch of the U.S. Department of Justice Civil Division during the first Trump administration. He represented the administration in cases challenging whether president Donald Trump's business holdings violated the emoluments clauses. Shumate participated in cases on Deferred Action for Childhood Arrivals, the Consumer Financial Protection Bureau, and a proposed citizenship question for the 2020 U.S. census.

In the summer of 2019, Shumate joined Jones Day, working in its government regulation practice under Don McGahn. When he left the firm on January 17, 2025, he was a partner. Trump's intent to nominate Shumate to head the Department of Justice Civil Division was announced that month. By February he was serving as the acting head and overseeing the defense of the second Trump administration regarding the 2025 U.S. federal mass layoffs and Department of Government Efficiency.

On June 9, 2025, the U.S. Senate voted 51-41 along party lines to confirm Shumate as the assistant attorney general for the civil division. He resigned his post on November 9, 2026.
