= United States Department of Justice Civil Division =

United States government department division

- Seal of the United States Department of Justice

Division overview
- Formed: 1930; 96 years ago
- Jurisdiction: Federal government of the United States
- Headquarters: Robert F. Kennedy Department of Justice Building 950 Pennsylvania Avenue NW Washington, D.C., United States
- Division executive: Jonathan Guynn (acting), Assistant Attorney General
- Parent department: United States Department of Justice
- Website: justice.gov/civil

The United States Department of Justice Civil Division represents the United States, its departments and agencies, members of Congress, cabinet officers, and other federal employees. Led by the United States Assistant Attorney General for the Civil Division, the Division's litigation reflects the diversity of government activities, involving, for example, the defense of challenges to presidential actions; national security issues; benefit programs; energy policies; commercial issues such as contract disputes, banking insurance, patents, fraud, and debt collection; all manner of accident and liability claims; enforcement of immigration laws; and civil and criminal violations of consumer protection laws. Each year, Division attorneys handle thousands of cases that collectively involve billions of dollars in claims and recoveries. The Division confronts significant policy issues, which often rise to constitutional dimensions, in defending and enforcing various Federal programs and actions.

In April 2021, President Joe Biden nominated Javier Guzman to lead the division as Assistant Attorney General. That nomination was withdrawn on July 20, 2021.

== Organization ==
The Civil Division is made up of the following offices:

- Appellate Staff
- Commercial Litigation Branch
  - Civil Fraud Section
  - General Corporate/Financial Litigation Section
  - Intellectual Property Section
  - Foreign Litigation Section
  - National Courts Section
- Consumer Protection Branch
- Federal Programs Branch
  - National Security, Foreign Relations, and Law Enforcement Section
  - Interstate and Foreign Commerce Section
  - Government Agencies and Corporations Section
  - Nondiscrimination Personnel Litigation Section
  - Discrimination in Employment Litigation Section
  - Human Resources Section
  - Interior, Agriculture, and Energy Concerns Section
  - Housing and Community Development Section
  - Freedom of Information and Privacy Section
  - Regulatory Enforcement and Defensive Banking Litigation Section
  - Disability Litigation Section
- Office of Immigration Litigation (OIL)
  - Appellate Section
  - District Court Section
- Office of Management Programs
- Torts Branch
  - Aviation, Space & Admiralty Section
  - Federal Tort Claims Act Section
  - Environmental Torts Section
  - Constitutional and Specialized Torts Section
  - Tobacco Litigation Section

== Office of the Assistant Attorney General ==
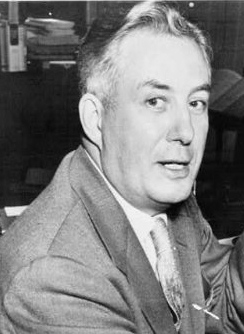
Former assistant attorney general and future Chief Justice of the United States, Warren E. Burger

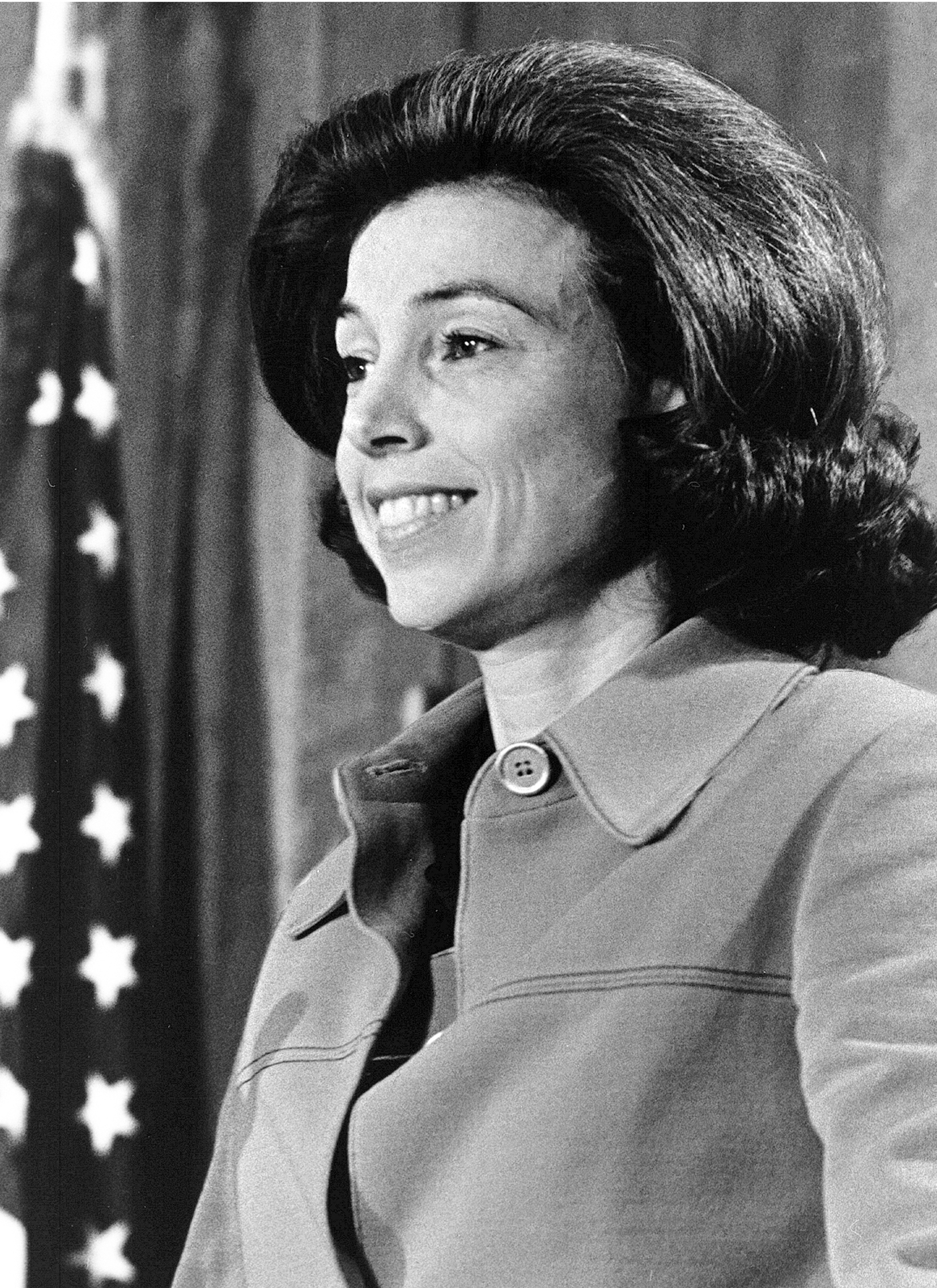
Carla Anderson Hills, the first female Assistant Attorney General

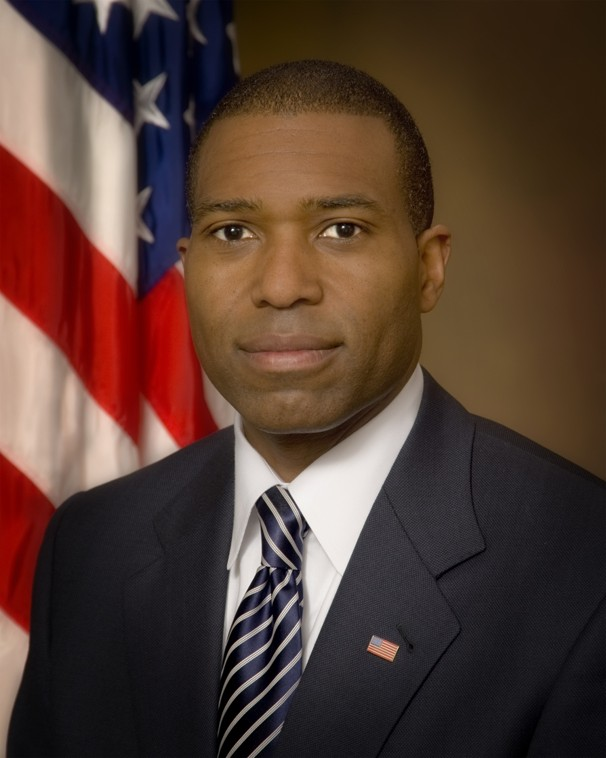
Tony West, the first African American Assistant Attorney General

#	Name	Term began	Term ended	President(s) served under
1	Charles B. Rugg	1930	1933	Herbert Hoover
2	George C. Sweeney	1933	1935	Franklin Delano Roosevelt
3	Angus D. MacLean	1935		Franklin Delano Roosevelt
4	James W. Morris	1935	1937	Franklin Delano Roosevelt
5	Sam E. Whitaker	1937	1939	Franklin Delano Roosevelt
6	Francis M. Shea	1939	1945	Franklin Delano Roosevelt
7	John F. Sonnett	1945	1947	Harry S. Truman
8	Peyton Ford	1947	1949	Harry S. Truman
9	H. Graham Morison	1949	1951	Harry S. Truman
10	Holmes Baldridge	1951	1953	Harry S. Truman
11	Warren E. Burger	1953	1956	Dwight D. Eisenhower
12	George Cochran Doub	1956	1960	Dwight D. Eisenhower
13	William Horsley Orrick Jr.	1961	1963	John F. Kennedy
14	John W. Douglas	1963	1966	John F. Kennedy; Lyndon B. Johnson
15	H. Barefoot Sanders Jr.	1966	1967	Lyndon B. Johnson
16	Edwin L. Weisl Jr.	1967	1969	Lyndon B. Johnson
17	William Ruckelshaus	1969	1970	Richard M. Nixon
18	L. Patrick Gray	1970	1972	Richard M. Nixon
19	Harlington Wood Jr.	1972	1973	Richard M. Nixon
20	Carla Anderson Hills	1973	1975	Richard M. Nixon
21	Rex E. Lee	1975	1977	Gerald R. Ford
22	Barbara A. Babcock	1977	1979	Jimmy Carter
23	Alice Daniels	1979	1981	Jimmy Carter
24	Paul J. McGrath	1981	1985	Ronald Reagan
25	Richard K. Willard	1985	1988	Ronald Reagan
26	John R. Bolton	1988	1989	Ronald Reagan
27	Stuart M. Gerson	1989	1993	George H. W. Bush
28	Frank W. Hunger	1993	1999	Bill Clinton
29	David W. Ogden	1999	2001	Bill Clinton
30	Robert D. McCallum Jr.	2001	2003	George W. Bush
31	Peter D. Keisler	2003	2007	George W. Bush
32	Gregory G. Katsas	2008	2009	George W. Bush
33	Tony West	2009	2012	Barack Obama
34	Stuart F. Delery	2012	2016	Barack Obama
—	Benjamin C. Mizer (acting)	2016	2017	Barack Obama
—	Chad Readler (acting)	2017	2018	Donald Trump
35	Jody Hunt	2018	2020	Donald Trump
—	Ethan P. Davis (acting)	2020	2020	Donald Trump
—	Jeffrey Clark (acting)	2020	2021	Donald Trump
—	Brian Boynton (acting)	2021	2025	Joe Biden
—	Yaakov M. Roth (acting)	2025	2025	Donald Trump
36	Brett A. Shumate	2025	2026	Donald Trump
—	Jonathan Guynn (acting)	2026	Incumbent	Donald Trump
