= Kevin J. O'Connor (attorney) =

American lawyer (born 1967)

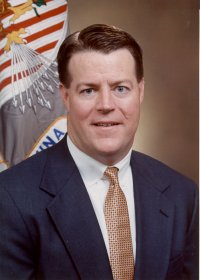

United States Associate Attorney General
- In office 2008–2009
- President: George W. Bush
- Preceded by: Gregory G. Katsas (acting)
- Succeeded by: Thomas J. Perrelli

Chief of Staff to the United States Attorney General
- In office April 2007 – November 2007
- Attorney General: Alberto Gonzales; Paul Clement; Peter Keisler; Michael Mukasey

United States Attorney for the District of Connecticut
- In office 2002–2008
- President: George W. Bush
- Preceded by: John A. Danaher III
- Succeeded by: Nora Dannehy

Personal details
- Born: Kevin James O'Connor; May 3, 1967 (age 58) Hartford, Connecticut, U.S.
- Party: Republican
- Education: University of Notre Dame (BA); University of Connecticut (JD)

Kevin James O'Connor (born May 3, 1967) is an American lawyer who serves as senior vice president, general counsel and corporate secretary for Lockheed Martin. Previously, he served as an attorney appointed by President George W. Bush and was unanimously confirmed by the United States Senate as Connecticut’s 48th United States Attorney in 2002. From January to April 2006, O'Connor served as an associate deputy attorney general. In 2007, O'Connor served as Chief of Staff to United States Attorney General Alberto R. Gonzales. In 2008, O'Connor was unanimously confirmed as Associate Attorney General of the United States, the number three position at the U.S. Department of Justice (DOJ), a post he held until 2009, when he left the DOJ to join the law firm of Bracewell and Giuliani.

== Legal Education ==
O’Connor graduated in 1992 with high honors from the University of Connecticut School of Law and with honors from the University of Notre Dame in 1989.

== Legal career ==
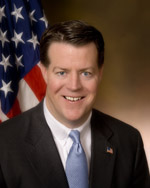
O'Connor as Associate Attorney General

From 1992 to 1993, O'Connor served as a law clerk to the Honorable William H. Timbers of the United States Court of Appeals for the Second Circuit.

From 1993 to 1995, O'Connor was a litigation associate at the law firm of Cahill Gordon & Reindel in New York City.

From 1995 to 1997, O'Connor served as a Staff Attorney and Senior Counsel in the Division of Enforcement of the United States Securities & Exchange Commission in Washington, D.C.

Prior to his appointment as United States Attorney, O'Connor was a partner in the law firm of Day, Berry & Howard. While with Day, Berry & Howard, O'Connor also served from 1999 to 2001 as Corporation Counsel for the Town of West Hartford, Connecticut.

In 1998, O'Connor was the Republican nominee for the U.S. House of Representatives in Connecticut's heavily Democratic 1st district. He was defeated by John Larson 58% to 41%.

O'Connor served as an adjunct professor at the University of Connecticut School of Law through 2015. From 1996 to 1997, O’Connor served as adjunct professor at the National Law Center at George Washington University.

In 2010, O'Connor considered a bid for Governor of Connecticut.

In 2015, O'Connor was appointed general counsel at Steven A. Cohen's Point72 Asset Management.

In 2016, he was a member of the Donald Trump's transition planning team. His job was to oversee the hiring process within the Department of Justice. However, he was let go on November 15, 2016.

In late November 2019, O'Connor joined Carrier Corporation (formerly a division of United Technologies Corporation) as General Counsel.

In January 2025, O'Connor joined Lockheed Martin as General Counsel.

Legal offices
Preceded by John A. Danaher III	United States Attorney for the District of Connecticut; 2002–2008	Succeeded by Nora Dannehy
Preceded by Gregory G. Katsas; Acting	United States Associate Attorney General; 2008–2009	Succeeded by Thomas J. Perrelli
