= United States Assistant Attorney General =

Government official rank in the Department of Justice

Flag of a U.S. assistant attorney general. Motto in English: For The Lady Who Pursues Justice.

Many of the divisions and offices of the United States Department of Justice (DOJ) are headed by an assistant attorney general.

The president of the United States appoints individuals to the position of assistant attorney general with the advice and consent of the Senate. United States Department of Justice components that are led by an assistant attorney general are:

- Antitrust Division
- Civil Division
- Civil Rights Division
- Criminal Division
- Environment and Natural Resources Division (ENRD)
- Justice Management Division (JMD)
- National Security Division
- Office of Justice Programs (OJP)
- Office of Legislative Affairs (OLA)
- Office of Legal Counsel (OLC)
- Office of Legal Policy (OLP)
- Tax Division
- National Fraud Enforcement Division

Assistant attorneys general report either to the deputy attorney general (in the case of the Criminal Division, the Justice Management Division and the Offices of Legal Counsel, Legislative Affairs, and Legal Policy) or to the associate attorney general (in the case of the Antitrust, Civil, Civil Rights, Environment & Natural Resources, and Tax Divisions and the Office of Justice Programs).

== List of U.S. assistant attorneys general ==
=== Assistant Attorney General ===
Name	Years of service	Appointed by President
Titian J. Coffey	1880–1884	Chester A. Arthur
Zachariah Montgomery	1885–1889	Grover Cleveland
John C. Chaney	1889–1893	Benjamin Harrison
William Arden Maury	1889–1893	Benjamin Harrison
Holmes Conrad	1893–1895	Grover Cleveland
Joshua Eric Dodge	1893–1897	Grover Cleveland
Edward Baldwin Whitney	1895–1897	Grover Cleveland
James Edmund Boyd	1897–1900	William McKinley
James M. Beck	1900–1903	William McKinley
James Clark McReynolds	1903–1907	Theodore Roosevelt
Edward Terry Sanford	1907–1908	Theodore Roosevelt
James Alexander Fowler	1908–1911	Theodore Roosevelt
William H. Lewis	1911	William Taft
Ernest Knaebel	1912–1916	William Taft
William L. Frierson	1917–1920	Woodrow Wilson
Annette Abbott Adams	1920–1921	Woodrow Wilson
Mabel Walker Willebrandt	1921–1929	Warren G. Harding, Calvin Coolidge
Roger Wilkins	1966–1969	Lyndon Johnson
Wesley Pomeroy	1968–1969	Richard Nixon

=== Antitrust Division ===
Name	Years of service	Appointed by
William Joseph Donovan	1926–1927	Calvin Coolidge
John Lord O'Brian	1929–1933	Herbert Hoover
Robert H. Jackson	1937–1938	Franklin D. Roosevelt
Thurman Arnold	1938–1943	Franklin D. Roosevelt
Wendell Berge	1943–1947	Franklin D. Roosevelt
John F. Sonnett	1947–1948	Harry S. Truman
Herbert Bergson	1948–1950	Harry S. Truman
Leonard Bessman	1950–1951	Harry S. Truman
H. Graham Morison	1951–1952	Harry S. Truman
Newell A. Clapp	1952–1953	acting
Stanley Barnes	1953–1956	Eisenhower
Victor R. Hansen	1956–1959	Eisenhower
Robert A. Bicks	1959–1961	Eisenhower
Lee Loevinger	1961–1963	Kennedy
William H. Orrick Jr.	1963–1965	Kennedy
Donald F. Turner	1965–1968	Lyndon Johnson
Edwin Zimmerman	1968–1969	Lyndon Johnson
Richard W. McLaren	1969–1972	Richard Nixon
Walker B. Comegys	1972	acting
Thomas E. Kauper	1972–1976	Richard Nixon
Donald I. Baker	1976–1977	Gerald R. Ford
John H. Shenefield	1977–1979	Jimmy Carter
Sanford Litvack	1979–1981	Jimmy Carter
William Baxter	1981–1983	Ronald Reagan
J. Paul McGrath	1983–1985	Ronald Reagan
Douglas H. Ginsburg	1985–1986	Ronald Reagan
Charles Rule	1986–1989	Ronald Reagan
James F. Rill	1989–1992	George H.W. Bush
Charles James	1992	acting
J. Mark Gidley	1992–1993	acting
Anne Bingaman	1993–1996	Bill Clinton
Joel Klein	1996–2000	Bill Clinton
Douglas Melamed	2000–2001	acting
Charles James	2001–2003	George W. Bush
R. Hewitt Pate	2003–2005	George W. Bush
Thomas O. Barnett	2005–2008	George W. Bush
Deborah A. Garza	2008–2009	acting
Christine A. Varney	2009–2011	Barack Obama
Sharis Pozen	2011–2012	acting
Joseph F. Wayland	2012	acting
Renata Hesse	2012–2013	acting
William Baer	2013–2017	Barack Obama
Makan Delrahim	2017–2021	Donald Trump
Jonathan Kanter	2021–2024	Joe Biden
Doha Mekki	2024–2025	acting
Gail Slater	2025–2026	Donald Trump

=== Civil Division ===
#	Name	Term began	Term ended	President(s) served under
1	Charles B. Rugg	1930	1933	Herbert Hoover
2	George Clinton Sweeney	1933	1935	Franklin D. Roosevelt
3	Angus D. MacLean	1935		Franklin D. Roosevelt
4	James W. Morris	1935	1937	Franklin D. Roosevelt
5	Sam E. Whitaker	1937	1939	Franklin D. Roosevelt
6	Francis M. Shea	1939	1945	Franklin D. Roosevelt
7	John F. Sonnett	1945	1947	Harry S. Truman
8	Peyton Ford	1947	1949	Harry S. Truman
9	H. Graham Morison	1949	1951	Harry S. Truman
10	Holmes Baldridge	1951	1953	Harry S. Truman
11	Warren E. Burger	1953	1956	Dwight D. Eisenhower
12	George Cochran Doub	1953	1960	Dwight D. Eisenhower
13	William H. Orrick Jr.	1961	1963	John F. Kennedy
14	John W. Douglas	1963	1966	John F. Kennedy; Lyndon B. Johnson
15	Barefoot Sanders	1966	1967	Lyndon B. Johnson
16	Edwin L. Weisl Jr.	1967	1969	Lyndon B. Johnson
17	William Ruckelshaus	1969	1970	Richard Nixon
18	L. Patrick Gray	1970	1972	Richard Nixon
19	Harlington Wood Jr.	1972	1973	Richard Nixon
20	Carla Anderson Hills	1973	1975	Richard Nixon
21	Rex E. Lee	1975	1977	Gerald Ford
22	Barbara A. Babcock	1977	1979	Jimmy Carter
23	Alice Daniels	1979	1981	Jimmy Carter
24	J. Paul McGrath	1981	1985	Ronald Reagan
25	Richard K. Willard	1985	1988	Ronald Reagan
26	John Bolton	1988	1989	Ronald Reagan
27	Stuart M. Gerson	1989	1993	George H. W. Bush
28	Frank W. Hunger	1993	1999	Bill Clinton
29	David W. Ogden	1999	2001	Bill Clinton
30	Robert McCallum Jr.	2001	2003	George W. Bush
31	Peter Keisler	2003	2007	George W. Bush
32	Gregory G. Katsas	2008	2009	George W. Bush
33	Tony West	2009	2012	Barack Obama
34	Stuart F. Delery	2012	2014	Barack Obama
-	Benjamin C. Mizer (acting)	2014	2017	Barack Obama
-	Chad Readler (acting)	2017	2018	Donald Trump
35	Jody Hunt	2018	2020	Donald Trump
-	Ethan P. Davis (acting)	2020	2020	Donald Trump
-	Jeffrey Clark (acting)	2020	2021	Donald Trump
-	Brian Boynton (acting)	2021	2025	Joe Biden
-	Brett Shumate (acting)	2025	2025	Donald Trump
-	Yaakov M. Roth (interim)	2025	Present	Donald Trump

=== Civil Rights Division ===
- Jesus A. Osete (Acting 2026–present)
- Harmeet Dhillon (2025–2026)
- Mac Warner (Acting 2025–present)
- Kristen Clarke (2021–2025)
- Eric Dreiband (2018–2021)
- John M. Gore (Acting 2017–2018)
- Thomas E. Wheeler II (Acting 2017)
- Vanita Gupta (Acting 2014–2017)
- Molly J. Moran (Acting 2014)
- Jocelyn Samuels (Acting 2013–2014)
- Thomas Perez, (2009–2013)
- Grace Chung Becker (Acting 2008)
- Wan J. Kim, (2005–2007)
- R. Alexander Acosta (2003–2005)
- Bradley Schlozman (Acting 2003)
- Ralph F. Boyd Jr. (2001–2003)
- William R. Yeomans (Acting 2001)
- Bill Lann Lee (1997–2001)
- Deval Patrick, (1994–1997)
- James P. Turner (Acting 1993–94)
- John R. Dunne(1990–1993)
- James P. Turner (Acting 1989–1990)
- William C. Lucas (Acting 1988–1989)
- William Bradford Reynolds (1981–1988)
- Drew S. Days, III (1977–1980)
- J. Stanley Pottinger (1973–1977)
- David Luke Norman (1971–1973)
- Jerris Leonard (1969–1971)
- Stephen J. Pollak (1968–1969)
- John Michael Doar (1965 to 1967)
- Burke Marshall (1961–1964)
- Harold R. Tyler (1960–1961)
- W. Wilson White (1957–1960)

=== Criminal Division ===
- Andrew Tysen Duva (2025-present)
- Kenneth Polite (2021–2023)
- Brian Benczkowski (2018–2020)
- Leslie Caldwell (2014–2017)
- Lanny Breuer (2009–2013)
- Alice Fisher (2005–2008)
- Christopher A. Wray (2003–2005)
- Michael Chertoff (2001–2003)
- James Robinson (1998–2001)
- Jo Ann Harris (1993–1995)
- Robert Mueller (1990–1993)
- Edward S.G. Dennis (1988–1990)
- William Weld (1986–1988)
- Stephen S. Trott (1983–1986)
- D. Lowell Jensen (1981–1983)
- Philip Heymann (1978–1981)
- Benjamin Civiletti (1977–1978)
- Dick Thornburgh (1975–1977)
- Henry E. Petersen (1972–1974)
- Will Wilson (1969–1971)
- Fred Vinson Jr. (1965–1969)
- Herbert Miller Jr. (1961–1965)
- Malcolm R. Wilkey (1959–1961)
- Malcolm Anderson (1958–1959)
- Warren Olney III (1953–1957)
- Charles B. Murray (1952–1953)
- James M. McInerney (1950–1952)
- Alexander M. Campbell (1948–1949)
- T. Vincent Quinn (1947–1948)
- Theron Caudle (1945–1947)
- Tom C. Clark (1943–1945)
- Wendell Berge (1940–1943)
- O. John Rogge (1939–1940)
- Brien McMahon (1936–1939)
- Joseph B. Keenan (1934–1936)
- Pat Malloy (1933)
- E. Nugent Dodds (1931–1933)
- Oscar R. Luhring (1925–1930)
- William J. Donovan (1924–1925)
- Earl J. Davis (1924)
- John Crim (1921–1923)
- Robert P. Stewart (1919–1921)

=== National Security Division ===
Name	President(s)	Announcement	Nomination sent to the Senate	Confirmation by the Senate	Sworn in	Left office
Kenneth L. Wainstein	George W. Bush	March 13, 2006		September 21, 2006	September 28, 2006	March 30, 2008, to become Homeland Security Advisor (Assistant to the President for Homeland Security and Counterterrorism)
J. Patrick Rowan	George W. Bush	June 19, 2008		September 26, 2008	October 3, 2008	January 20, 2009
David S. Kris	Barack Obama	January 22, 2009	February 11, 2009	March 25, 2009	–	–
Lisa Monaco	Barack Obama	March 17, 2011		June 28, 2011	July 1, 2011	March 8, 2013
John Demers	Donald Trump, Joe Biden	September 2, 2017	September 5, 2017	February 15, 2018	February 22, 2018	June 21, 2021
Matthew G. Olsen	Joe Biden	May 26, 2021	May 27, 2021	October 28, 2021	November 1, 2021	January 20, 2025
John A. Eisenberg	Donald Trump	February 19, 2025	March 10, 2025	June 5, 2025	June 5, 2025	

=== Environment and Natural Resources Division ===
- Ernest Knaebel (1911–1916)
- Francis J. Kearful (1917-1919)
- Frank K. Nebeker (1919-1920)
- Leslie C. Garnett (1920-1921)
- William D. Riter (1921-1924)
- Ira K. Wells (1924-1925)
- Bertice M. Parmentier (1925-1929)
- Seth W. Richardson (1929-1933)
- Harry W. Blair (1933-1937)
- Carl McFarland (1937-1939)
- Norman Littel (1939-1944)
- David L. Bazelon (1946-1947)
- A. Devitt Vanech (1947-1951)
- William Amory Underhill (1951-1952)
- James M. McInerney (1952-1953)
- Perry W. Morton (1953-1961)
- Ramsey Clark (1961–1965)
- Edwin L. Weisl Jr. (1965-1967)
- Clyde O. Martz (1967-1969)
- Shiro Kashiwa (1969-1972)
- Kent Frizzell (1972-1973)
- Wallace H. Johnson (1973-1975)
- Peter Taft (1975-1977)
- James W. Moorman (1977-1981)
- Carol E. Dinkins (1981-1983)
- F. Henry Habicht II (1983-1987)
- Roger J. Marzulla (1988-1989)
- Richard B. Stewart (1989-1991)
- Lois J. Schiffer (1993-2001)
- Thomas L. Sansonetti (2001-2005)
- Sue Ellen Wooldridge (2005-2007)
- Ronald J. Tenpas (2007-2009)
- Ignacia S. Moreno (2009-2013)
- John C. Cruden (2015-2017)
- Jeffrey Clark (2018–2021)
- Jean E. Williams (2021)
- Todd Kim (2021–2025)
- Adam F. Gustafson (acting) (2025-)

=== Justice Management Division ===
- Jolene Ann Lauria (2023-present)

=== Tax Division ===
- Robert H. Jackson (1936–1938)
- Mabel Walker Willebrandt (1921–1929)
- Tamara W. Ashford (2014)
- David A. Hubbert (2021-present)

=== Office of Justice Programs ===
- Jimmy Gurulé (1990–1992)
- Laurie O. Robinson (1993-2000)
- Maureen A. Henneberg (2015-present)

=== Office of Legal Counsel ===
Name	Years served	Appointed by	Notes
Angus D. MacLean	1933–1935	Franklin D. Roosevelt	
Golden W. Bell	1935–1939	Franklin D. Roosevelt	
Charles Fahy	1940–1941	Franklin D. Roosevelt	
Oscar S. Cox	1942–1943	Franklin D. Roosevelt	
Hugh B. Cox	1943–1945	Franklin D. Roosevelt	
Harold W. Judson	1945–1946	Franklin D. Roosevelt	
George T. Washington	1946–1949	Harry Truman	
Abraham J. Harris	1950–1951	Harry Truman	
Joseph C. Duggan	1951–1952	Harry Truman	
J. Lee Rankin	1953–1956	Dwight Eisenhower	Became Solicitor General in 1956.
W. Wilson White	1957	Dwight Eisenhower	After a short tenure, selected to be first head of the Justice Department's Civil Rights Division.
Malcolm R. Wilkey	1958–1959	Dwight Eisenhower	
Robert Kramer	1959–1961	Dwight Eisenhower	
Nicholas Katzenbach	1961–1962	John F. Kennedy	
Norbert A. Schlei	1962–1966	John F. Kennedy	
Frank H. Wozencraft	1966–1969	Lyndon Johnson	
William H. Rehnquist	1969–1971	Richard Nixon	Later nominated and confirmed as Associate, and subsequent Chief Justice of the U.S. Supreme Court.
Ralph E. Erickson	1971–1972	Richard Nixon	
Roger C. Cramton	1972–1973	Richard Nixon	
Antonin Scalia	1974–1977	Gerald Ford	Later nominated and confirmed as Associate Justice of the U.S. Supreme Court.
John M. Harmon	1977–1981	Jimmy Carter	
Theodore B. Olson	1981–1984	Ronald Reagan	Later became U.S. Solicitor General.
Charles J. Cooper	1985–1988	Ronald Reagan	
Douglas Kmiec	1988–1989	Ronald Reagan	Later U.S. Ambassador to the Republic of Malta during the "Arab Spring" uprisings.
William P. Barr	1989–1990	George H. W. Bush	
Michael Luttig	1990–1991	George H. W. Bush	
Timothy Flanigan	1991–1992	George H. W. Bush	
Walter Dellinger	1993–1994	Bill Clinton	Later became acting U.S. Solicitor General.
Beth Nolan	1995	acting	Served as acting Assistant AG, OLC, while Deputy Assistant Attorney General. Nominated to become Assistant AG, OLC, but Senate did not vote on the nomination. Became White House Counsel in 1996.
Dawn Johnsen	1996–1998	acting	
Randolph D. Moss	1998–2001	Bill Clinton	Served as acting AAG from 1998 to 2000; nominated November 9, 1999; Recess-appointed August 3, 2000; confirmed by United States Senate December 15, 2000
Jay S. Bybee	2001 – March 2003	George W. Bush	In charge when the OLC issued the Bybee memo and other Torture memos; appointed as a federal judge; started March 21, 2003
Jack Goldsmith	October 2003 – June 2004	George W. Bush	Later Professor at Harvard Law School and author of The Terror Presidency (2007)
Daniel Levin	2004–2005	acting	
Steven G. Bradbury	2005–2009	acting	Served as acting AAG 2005–2007 (nominated June 23, 2005; nomination approved by Senate Judiciary Committee but never voted on by full Senate), continued to function as senior appointed official in charge of OLC until January 20, 2009.
David J. Barron	2009–2010	acting	Professor at Harvard Law School and served as Acting AAG from January 2009 to July 2010.
Jonathan G. Cedarbaum	2010–2011	acting	Served as acting AAG, July–November 2010; continued to function as senior appointed official in charge of OLC until the end of January 2011.
Caroline D. Krass	2011	acting	Senior appointed official leading OLC since the end of January 2011 until June 2011, when Virginia A. Seitz was confirmed.
Virginia A. Seitz	2011–2013	Barack Obama	Confirmed by the Senate in a voice vote on June 28, 2011. Resigned effective December 20, 2013.
Karl R. Thompson	2014–2017	acting	Appointed Principal Deputy AAG on March 24, 2014.
Curtis E. Gannon	2017	acting	Appointed Principal Deputy AAG on January 20, 2017.
Steven Engel	2017–2021	Donald Trump	
Christopher H. Schroeder	2021–2023	Joe Biden	
Benjamin C. Mizer	2023	acting	
Gillian E. Metzger	2023–2024	acting	
Christopher Fonzone	2024–2025	Joe Biden	
Henry C. Whitaker	2025–2025	Donald Trump	Appointed acting head for a limited period.
T. Elliot Gaiser	2025–present	Donald Trump	

=== Office of Legal Policy ===
- Viet D. Dinh (2001–2003)
- Daniel J. Bryant (2003–2005)
- Rachel Brand (2005–2007)
- Elisebeth C. Cook (2008–2009)
- Christopher H. Schroeder (2010–2012)
- Beth Ann Williams (2017–2020)
- Hampton Dellinger (2021–2024)
- Aaron Reitz (2025)
- Daniel E. Burrows (2026–present)

=== Office of Legislative Affairs ===
- Patrick D. Davis (2025-present)
- Carlos Uriarte (August 2022 - January 2025)
- Peter Hyun (November 2021 – August 2022; acting)
- Helaine Greenfeld (January 2021 – November 2021; acting)
- Stephen Boyd (August 2017 – January 2021)
- Peter J. Kadzik (June 2014 – January 2017)
- Judith C. Appelbaum (June 13, 2012–?)
- Ronald H. Weich (April 29, 2009 – April 25, 2012)
- Richard Hertling (2003–2007)
- Daniel J. Bryant (2001–2003)
- Robert Raben (1999–2001)
- Jon Jennings Acting (1998–1999)
- L. Anthony Sutin (1998)
- John R. Bolton (1985–1989)
- Robert A. McConnell (1981–1985)
- Patricia Wald (1977–1979)
- Michael Uhlmann (1975–1977)
- Mitch McConnell (1975, acting)
- W. Vincent Rakestraw (March 3, 1974 – February 1, 1975)
- Mike McKevitt (1973)

=== National Fraud Enforcement Division ===
- Colin McDonald (2026)

=== War Division (1942-1945) ===
- James W. Morris (1942–1943)
- Tom C. Clark (1943–1945)
