= List of Department of Justice appointments by Joe Biden =

President Biden will make many nominations to key roles in the Department of Justice, including the attorney general, deputy attorney general, and solicitor general. As with all other nominations, almost all of them have to be confirmed by the United States Senate before they can start their service.

Below is a list of nominations and appointments to the Department of Justice by Joe Biden, the 46th president of the United States. As of July 19, 2024, according to tracking by The Washington Post and Partnership for Public Service, 13 nominees have been confirmed, 1 nominee is being considered by the Senate, 11 positions do not have nominees, and 6 appointments have been made to positions that don't require Senate confirmation.

== Color key ==
Denotes appointees awaiting Senate confirmation.

Denotes appointees serving in an acting capacity.

Denotes appointees who have left office or offices which have been disbanded.

== Leadership ==
Office	Nominee	Assumed office	Left office
— Attorney General	Merrick Garland	March 11, 2021 (Confirmed March 10, 2021, 70–30)	January 20, 2025
— Deputy Attorney General	Lisa Monaco	April 21, 2021 (Confirmed April 20, 2021, 98–2)	January 20, 2025
— Associate Attorney General
— Associate Attorney General	Ben Mizer	February 2, 2024	January 20, 2025
— Associate Attorney General	Vanita Gupta	April 22, 2021 (Confirmed April 21, 2021, 51–49)	February 2, 2024
— Solicitor General	Elizabeth Prelogar	October 28, 2021 (Confirmed October 28, 2021, 53–36)	January 20, 2025

== Divisions ==
Office	Nominee	Assumed office	Left office
— Assistant Attorney General (Antitrust Division)	Jonathan Kanter	November 16, 2021 (Confirmed November 16, 2021, 68–29)	December 20, 2024
— Assistant Attorney General (Civil Rights)	Kristen Clarke	May 25, 2021 (Confirmed May 25, 2021, 51–48)	—
— Assistant Attorney General (Criminal Division)	Kenneth Polite	July 21, 2021 (Confirmed July 20, 2021, 56–44)	July 28, 2023
— Assistant Attorney General (Environment and Natural Resources Division)	Todd Kim	July 28, 2021 (Confirmed July 27, 2021, 58–41)	—
— Assistant Attorney General (National Security Division)	Matthew G. Olsen	November 1, 2021 (Confirmed October 28, 2021, 53–45)	—

== Offices ==
Office	Nominee	Assumed office	Left office
— Assistant Attorney General (Office of Legal Counsel)	Christopher Fonzone	January 5, 2024 (Confirmed December 19, 2023, 50–17)	—
— Assistant Attorney General (Office of Legal Counsel)	Christopher H. Schroeder	October 29, 2021 (Confirmed October 28, 2021, 56–41)	July 9, 2023
— Assistant Attorney General (Office of Legal Policy)	Hampton Dellinger	November 1, 2021 (Confirmed October 28, 2021, 53–37)	June 15, 2023
— Assistant Attorney General (Office of Legislative Affairs)	Carlos Uriarte	August 15, 2022 (Confirmed August 4, 2022 by voice vote)	—

== Federal agencies ==
Office	Nominee	Assumed office	Left office
Bureau of Alcohol, Tobacco, Firearms and Explosives
— Director of the Bureau of Alcohol, Tobacco, Firearms and Explosives	Steve Dettelbach	July 13, 2022 (Confirmed July 12, 2022, 48–46)	January 17, 2025
Drug Enforcement Administration
— Administrator of the Drug Enforcement Administration	Anne Milgram	June 28, 2021 (Confirmed June 24, 2021 by voice vote)	—
United States Marshals Service
— Director of the United States Marshals Service	Ronald L. Davis	September 27, 2021 (Confirmed September 22, 2021 by voice vote)	January 17, 2025

== Other offices and agencies ==
Office	Nominee	Assumed office	Left office
Office of Justice Programs
— Assistant Attorney General (Office of Justice Programs)	Amy L. Solomon	May 2, 2023 (Confirmed April 18, 2023, 59–40)	July 19, 2024
— Director of the Bureau of Justice Assistance	Karhlton F. Moore	February 28, 2022	—
— Director of the Bureau of Justice Statistics	Alex Piquero	August 15, 2022	—
— Director of the National Institute of Justice	Nancy La Vigne	May 9, 2022	—
— Director of the Office for Victims of Crime	Kristina Rose	July 12, 2021	—
— Administrator of the Office of Juvenile Justice and Delinquency Prevention	Liz Ryan	May 16, 2022	—
— Director of the Office of Sex Offender Sentencing, Monitoring, Apprehending, Registering, and Tracking (SMART)	Helena Heath	January 30, 2023	—
Community Relations Service
— Director of Community Relations Service	Paul Monteiro	May 26, 2022 (Confirmed April 28, 2022 by voice vote)	April 3, 2023 Appointed as Secretary of Service of Maryland
Office on Violence Against Women
— Director of the Office on Violence Against Women	Rosie Hidalgo	July 18, 2023 (Confirmed July 11, 2023, 51–42)	—

== Withdrawn nominations ==
Office	Nominee	Announced	Withdrawn	Notes
— Assistant Attorney General (Civil Division)	Javier M. Guzman	April 27, 2021	July 20, 2021	
— Director of the Bureau of Alcohol, Tobacco, Firearms and Explosives	David Chipman	April 6, 2021	September 9, 2021	
— Assistant Attorney General (Office of Legislative Affairs)	Helaine Greenfeld	April 23, 2021	January 3, 2022	Nomination not resubmitted
— Commissioner of the United States Parole Commission	Almo J. Carter	July 27, 2022	January 3, 2025	Nomination not resubmitted

== See also ==
- List of federal judges appointed by Joe Biden
- Joe Biden Supreme Court candidates
- Cabinet of Joe Biden, for the vetting process undergone by top-level roles including advice and consent by the Senate
- List of executive branch 'czars' e.g. Special Advisor to the President

== Notes ==
Confirmation votes

Confirmations by roll call vote

Confirmations by voice vote
