= Walter Dellinger =

American attorney, law professor, and government official (1941–2022)

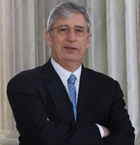

Solicitor General of the United States
- Acting
- In office July 1, 1996 – November 13, 1997
- President: Bill Clinton
- Preceded by: Drew Days
- Succeeded by: Seth P. Waxman

United States Assistant Attorney General for Office of Legal Counsel
- In office October 1993 – June 30, 1996
- President: Bill Clinton
- Preceded by: Timothy Flanigan
- Succeeded by: Christopher H. Schroeder (Acting)

Personal details
- Born: Walter Estes Dellinger III; May 15, 1941 Charlotte, North Carolina, U.S.
- Died: February 16, 2022 (aged 80) Chapel Hill, North Carolina, U.S.
- Party: Democratic
- Spouse: Anne Maxwell (died 2021)
- Children: 2, including Hampton
- Education: University of North Carolina at Chapel Hill (BA); Yale University (JD)

Walter Estes Dellinger III (May 15, 1941 – February 16, 2022) was an American attorney and legal scholar who served as the Douglas B. Maggs Professor of Law at Duke University School of Law. He also led the appellate practice at O'Melveny & Myers in Washington, D.C., and Harvard Law School's Supreme Court and Appellate Litigation Clinic. He served as Acting United States Solicitor General under the administration of President Bill Clinton, from 1996 to 1997.

== Early life and education ==
Dellinger was born in Charlotte, North Carolina, to Grace (Lawning) Dellinger, who worked selling men's clothing, and Walter Dellinger II, who died at an early age. He earned a Bachelor of Arts degree in political science from the University of North Carolina at Chapel Hill in 1963 and a Juris Doctor from Yale Law School in 1966. He clerked for Justice Hugo Black of the U.S. Supreme Court.

== Career ==
In 1969, Dellinger became a professor at Duke University School of Law.

In 1993, he joined the Clinton Administration as Assistant Attorney General in charge of the Office of Legal Counsel. Because of his advocacy for liberal causes, his nomination was filibustered by the two conservative senators from his home state of North Carolina, Jesse Helms and Lauch Faircloth, but Dellinger was ultimately confirmed.

Dellinger served as the acting United States Solicitor General for the 1996–1997 Term of the Supreme Court. He argued nine cases and won five, including a case defending the president's line-item veto and two cases defending laws that barred assisted suicide.

He also appeared as a commentator on This Week, the ABC News Sunday morning program hosted by George Stephanopoulos.

On March 18, 2008, he unsuccessfully represented the District of Columbia before the United States Supreme Court in District of Columbia v. Heller. The District argued that its Firearms Control Regulations Act of 1975 should not be restricted by the Second Amendment. The ban was overturned by the Supreme Court.

In February 2008, Dellinger represented ExxonMobil in the Supreme Court in Exxon Shipping Co. v. Baker, which addressed whether certain punitive damages are available under federal maritime law. This case relates to the Exxon Valdez oil spill of 1989.

On March 5, 2010, the Washington Post published an op-ed by Dellinger defending Karl Thompson.

In 2010, North Carolina Governor Bev Perdue inducted Dellinger into the Order of the Long Leaf Pine, calling him "North Carolina’s best friend, legally, that we’ve ever had."

In early 2012, Dellinger represented the defendant in United States v. Antoine Jones, in which the US Supreme Court barred the government's warrantless use of a GPS device on Jones' Jeep Grand Cherokee as part of a drug trafficking investigation. Dellinger said the decision in the case was "a signal event in Fourth Amendment history".

== Personal life and death ==
Dellinger and his wife, the former Anne Maxwell, had two sons: Andrew, a poet and professor; and Hampton, a lawyer. Dellinger died from pulmonary fibrosis at his home in Chapel Hill, North Carolina, on February 16, 2022, at the age of 80.

== See also ==
- List of law clerks for the first seat of the Supreme Court of the United States

Legal offices
Preceded by Drew Days	Solicitor General of the United States (Acting); 1996–1997	Succeeded by Seth P. Waxman
