= Dawn Johnsen =

American lawyer

Dawn Elizabeth Johnsen

Acting Assistant Attorney General for the Office of Legal Counsel
- In office January 20, 2021 – October 29, 2021
- President: Joe Biden
- Preceded by: Steven Engel
- Succeeded by: Christopher H. Schroeder
- In office 1997–1998
- President: Bill Clinton
- Preceded by: Beth Nolan (acting)
- Succeeded by: Randolph Moss

Personal details
- Born: August 14, 1961 (age 65) Manhasset, New York, U.S.
- Education: Yale University (BA, JD)

Dawn Elizabeth Johnsen (born August 14, 1961) is an American lawyer and the Walter W. Foskett Professor of Constitutional law, on the faculty at Maurer School of Law at Indiana University in Bloomington, Indiana. She previously served in the Biden administration as Acting Attorney General at the Office of Legal Counsel, having been appointed on January 20, 2021, by President Joe Biden, to return to the role she previously held in the Clinton administration. She was succeeded in that role in a permanent capacity by Christopher H. Schroeder, and is currently serving as the Principal Deputy Assistant Attorney General in the same office.

Johnsen worked at the Office of Legal Counsel in the United States Department of Justice from 1993 to 1998 and served as acting Assistant Attorney General from 1997 to 1998; she was twice nominated to the post in the Obama administration. Johnsen's first nomination was approved by the Senate Judiciary Committee in March 2009 in a party line vote, but was not acted on by the full Senate before it recessed at the end of 2009. Obama then renominated her to the post on January 20, 2010, but on April 9, 2010, Johnsen withdrew her name from consideration.

== Early life and education ==
Born in Manhasset, New York, Johnsen attended Carle Place High School in Carle Place, New York, graduating in 1979 as its salutatorian. She received her B.A. summa cum laude in economics and political science at Yale College in 1983 and her J.D. at Yale Law School in 1986, where she served as an Articles Editor of the Yale Law Journal.

After graduating law school, Johnsen clerked for United States Appeals Court Judge Richard Dickson Cudahy of the United States Court of Appeals for the Seventh Circuit from September 1986 until August 1987.

== Professional career ==
Johnsen worked for the American Civil Liberties Union as a staff counsel fellow on a one-year fellowship from 1987 until 1988, and then worked for the National Abortion & Reproductive Rights Action League (currently NARAL Pro-Choice America) from 1988 until 1993. From 1993 to 1998, Johnsen worked in the Office of Legal Counsel. She was a Deputy Assistant Attorney General from 1993 until 1996, and served as Acting Assistant Attorney General heading the OLC from 1997 until 1998. Johnsen joined the Indiana University faculty in 1998 upon leaving government service. She teaches Constitutional Law, the First Amendment, and Seminars in the Separation of Powers and Sexuality, Reproduction and the Constitution.

Johnsen is a member of the national boards of the American Constitution Society for Law and Policy and the Guttmacher Institute.

In November 2020, Johnsen was named a volunteer member of the Joe Biden presidential transition Agency Review Team to support transition efforts related to the United States Department of Justice.

== Nominations to Assistant Attorney General ==
=== 2009 nomination ===
As President-Elect, Obama announced his intention to nominate Johnsen to head the Office of Legal Counsel in the United States Department of Justice. Her nomination was approved by the Judiciary Committee on a party-line vote and sent to the full Senate on March 19, 2009.

In December 2009, Senator Patrick Leahy, the Chair of the Judiciary Committee, called on the Senate to approve Johnsen and several other nominees, and denounced the "unprecedented delays in the consideration of qualified and noncontroversial nominations". The Washington Post agreed, editorializing that the treatment of Johnsen's nomination was a "travesty" and adding: "Ms. Johnsen is highly qualified and should be confirmed. At the very least, senators should have the decency to give her an up-or-down vote." Nevertheless, the Senate did not act on the nomination before it ended its 2009 session. As a result, the nomination was sent back to the White House, leaving Obama to decide whether to renominate Johnsen. Obama also had the option of making a recess appointment, which would have enabled Johnsen to fill the post until the end of the 2010 session of the Senate.

==== Support ====
On April 16, 2009, Johnsen's nomination was endorsed by the Society of American Law Teachers, which described her as "an expert on Constitutional Law with an impressive resume of scholarship that illustrates the depth of her understanding of American jurisprudence."

After Arlen Specter switched to the Democratic Party, Representative Joe Sestak announced that he would challenge Specter in the Democratic primary in 2010. In January 2010, Sestak criticized Specter for his role in blocking Johnsen's nomination. Shortly thereafter, Specter announced that he would vote to confirm Johnsen. By some counts, therefore, Johnsen's nomination may have had the 60 votes needed to overcome the threatened Republican filibuster, although the special election of Republican Scott Brown to be Massachusetts' junior senator might have complicated that.

==== Opposition ====
The nomination encountered opposition from Republican senators who cited Johnsen's criticisms of the OLC during the administration of President George W. Bush. The New York Times reported that she had criticized OLC memoranda that said the president could largely ignore international treaties and Congress in fighting terrorists and that critics have portrayed as allowing torture in interrogation, and criticized the legal theories behind the OLC's position in detail The broad reading of presidential authority was “outlandish,” and the constitutional arguments were “shockingly flawed,” Ms. Johnsen had written. One Republican member of the Senate Judiciary Committee, Senator John Cornyn, said that Johnsen did not have the “requisite seriousness” for the post. A Democratic member of the committee, Senator Sheldon Whitehouse, called such attacks hypocritical in light of Republicans' silence about the OLC during the Bush administration: "Where were you when those incompetent, ideological opinions were being issued?"

As of May 2009, there were believed to be 37 Republican senators (out of 40) who would vote against confirming Johnsen. Her nomination was endorsed by Senator Richard Lugar, a senior Republican from Johnsen's state of Indiana. The remaining two Republicans, Senators Susan Collins and Olympia Snowe of Maine, have not announced their positions. One other Democrat, Senator Ben Nelson of Nebraska, joined Specter in expressing opposition to the nomination, but neither Nelson nor Specter publicly stated whether he would vote for a cloture motion to end a threatened Republican filibuster. Johnsen was supported by the remaining 57 Democrats as of May 2009.

=== 2010 nomination ===
In early January 2010, White House officials began telling reporters that Obama was planning to renominate Johnsen to head the OLC. On January 20, 2010, Obama renominated Johnsen to the post. Johnsen's nomination was withdrawn on April 9, 2010. In a statement, Johnsen mentioned that the delays and strong political opposition had threatened her ability to restore the non-partisanship and efficiency of the Office of Legal Counsel.

In January 2017, in an article for Slate.com, Johnsen described the "personal toll" of the Senate's refusal to vote on her nomination to head the Department of Justice's Office of Legal Counsel in 2009 and 2010. (She posited that Merrick Garland should be appointed to the U.S. Supreme Court and then any future vacancy should be filled in proper order, claiming that the vacancy caused by the death of Antonin Scalia "exists only as the result of the wrongful denial of the legitimacy of Obama's presidency. It is a breakdown of the very functioning of our democracy and a slap in the face to constitutional norms. It is an attempted theft that, if permitted, would bring longstanding consequences.")

== Office of Legal Counsel (2021–) ==
On January 20, 2021, President Joe Biden swore Johnsen into office once more as the Acting Attorney General for OLC, pending nomination of a Senate-confirmed candidate for the full-time role.

On July 30, 2021, Johnsen wrote an opinion directing the Department of the Treasury to turn over the tax returns of Donald Trump to the United States House Committee on Ways and Means, stating that the committee had "invoked sufficient reasons" to request the tax information. This reversed the June 2019 OLC opinion by Steven Engel which had argued that the House had lacked a "legitimate legislative purpose" to warrant receiving the information. Johnsen wrote that Engel's opinion "failed to afford the Committee the respect due to a coordinate branch of government."

== Personal ==
Johnsen is a Methodist who teaches Sunday school. Her husband, John Hamilton, was Mayor of Bloomington, Indiana, from 2016 to 2023. They have two children. Prior to being mayor, Hamilton served as Secretary of the Indiana Family and Social Services Administration, Commissioner of the Indiana Department of Environmental Management and served as an elected member of the Board of Trustees for the Monroe County Community School Corporation. He also founded City First Bank of D.C. (City First), a certified Community Development Financial Institution dedicated to strengthening low-to-moderate-income communities.

Johnsen's brother-in-law is United States Court of Appeals for the Seventh Circuit Senior Circuit Judge David Hamilton.
