= Paul McGrath =

Paul McGrath may refer to:

- Paul McGrath (actor) (1904–1978), American actor
- J. Paul McGrath (1940–2013), American attorney
- Paul McGrath (politician) (born 1948), Irish politician
- Paul McGrath (footballer) (born 1959), Irish international footballer
- Paul McGrath (conductor) (born 1964), British conductor
- Paul McGrath (Gaelic footballer) (born 1966), Irish Gaelic footballer
- Paul McGrath (race walker) (born 2002), Spanish race-walker
