= Office of Legal Counsel =

Office of the United States Department of Justice

United States Department of Justice Office of Legal Counsel
- Seal of the U.S. Department of Justice

Office overview
- Formed: 1934; 92 years ago
- Jurisdiction: Federal government of the United States
- Headquarters: Robert F. Kennedy Department of Justice Building; 950 Pennsylvania Avenue NW; Washington, D.C., United States
- Office executive: T. Elliot Gaiser, Assistant Attorney General
- Parent department: U.S. Department of Justice
- Website: Official website

The Office of Legal Counsel (OLC) is an office in the United States Department of Justice that supports the attorney general in their role as legal adviser to the president and all executive branch agencies. It drafts legal opinions of the attorney general and provides its own written opinions and other advice in response to requests from the counsel to the president, the various agencies of the executive branch, and other components of the Department of Justice. The office reviews and comments on the constitutionality of pending legislation. The office reviews any executive orders and substantive proclamations for legality if the president proposes them. All proposed orders of the attorney general and regulations that require the attorney general's approval are reviewed. It also performs a variety of special assignments referred by the attorney general or the deputy attorney general.

== History ==
The Office of Legal Counsel was created in 1934 by an act of Congress, as part of a larger reorganization of executive branch administrative agencies. It was first headed by an assistant solicitor general. In 1951, attorney general J. Howard McGrath made it a division led by an assistant attorney, and named it the Executive Adjudications Division. This name was changed to Office of Legal Counsel in an administrative order by attorney general Herbert Brownell Jr., issued April 3, 1953. The post has been held by the leading icons of the conservative legal movement, including two former Supreme Court justices William Rehnquist and Antonin Scalia.

== Responsibilities ==
The Office of Legal Counsel (OLC) assists the attorney general of the United States in their function as legal adviser to the president and all the executive branch agencies, hence the appellation "the president's law firm." OLC drafts legal opinions of the attorney general and also provides its own written opinions and oral advice in response to requests from the counsel to the president, the various agencies of the executive branch, and offices within the Department of Justice. Such requests typically deal with legal issues of particular complexity and importance or about which two or more agencies are in disagreement. The office also is responsible for providing legal advice to the executive branch on all constitutional questions and reviewing pending legislation for constitutionality.

Usually all executive orders and proclamations proposed to be issued by the president are reviewed by OLC for form and legality, as are various other matters that require the president's formal approval. In addition to serving as, in effect, outside counsel for the other agencies of the executive branch, OLC also functions as general counsel for the Department of Justice itself. It reviews all proposed orders of the attorney general and all regulations requiring the attorney general's approval.

According to press accounts, OLC has historically acted as a referee within the executive branch and its legal opinions have generally been given deference among the agencies and departments. The Brennan Center for Justice described opinions of the Office of Legal Counsel as "authoritative legal interpretations that have the same legal force as the statutes they interpreted."

== Controversies ==
=== George W. Bush administration ===
During President George W. Bush's first term in office, OLC deputy assistant attorney general John Yoo drafted, and assistant attorney general Jay S. Bybee signed, a set of legal memoranda that became known as the "torture memos." These memos advised the CIA and the Department of Defense that the president may lawfully authorize the torture of detainees (euphemistically referred to as "enhanced interrogation techniques"), including beating, binding in contorted stress positions, hooding, subjection to deafening noise, sleep disruption, sleep deprivation to the point of hallucination, deprivation of food, drink, and withholding medical care for wounds, as well as waterboarding, walling, sexual humiliation, subjection to extreme heat or extreme cold, and confinement in small, coffin-like boxes. The Justice Department's Office of Professional Responsibility (OPR) later concluded that Yoo committed "intentional professional misconduct" in advising the CIA that it could torture detainees and that by signing Yoo's memorandum, Bybee had "acted in reckless disregard of his obligation to provide thorough, objective, and candid legal advice."

In May 2005, during President George W. Bush's second term, a set of similar torture memos were approved by Steven G. Bradbury, who served as acting head of OLC from February 2005 through the remainder of President Bush's second term. Bradbury was first officially nominated on June 23, 2005, and then repeatedly re-nominated because of Senate inaction. His position became a point of political friction between the Republican president and the Democratic-controlled 110th Congress, when Democrats contended that Bradbury was in the position illegally, while Republicans argued that Democrats were using his nomination to score political points. An opinion issued by the Government Accountability Office concluded that his status was not a violation of the Federal Vacancies Reform Act of 1998.

=== Obama administration ===
In the first two years of the Obama administration, OLC at least twice reached an outcome with which Administration officials disagreed. In June 2011, New York Times reporter Charlie Savage revealed that President Obama took the unusual step of overruling the Office of Legal Counsel's advice with respect to the legality of military action in Libya. OLC's written opinions have historically been considered binding on the executive branch, unless they are overturned by the attorney general or president. In 2009, attorney general Eric Holder overturned an unpublished OLC opinion that had concluded that a D.C. voting rights bill pending in Congress was unconstitutional.

=== Trump administration ===
Early in the Trump administration, OLC approved Executive Order 13769 (referred to as the "travel ban" because it restricted entry from certain foreign countries which had Muslim-majority populations). Days later, acting attorney general Sally Yates announced that the Department of Justice would not defend the order in court. Explaining her decision, Yates stated that OLC's review assessed only whether a "proposed executive order is lawful on its face and properly drafted," not outside evidence about the order's purposes or whether the policy of the order is "wise or just." Yates was fired later that day. Her successor as acting attorney general, Dana Boente, referenced OLC's analysis when he reversed her decision. The executive order was challenged in court, then superseded by subsequent executive orders and presidential proclamations.

In a United States Senate hearing, Yates was asked whether she was aware of any past instance of an attorney general rejecting an executive order that had been approved by OLC. Yates testified that she was not aware of that ever happening, but that she was also not aware of a situation in which OLC failed to tell the attorney general about an executive order before it was issued.

==== Barr letter ====
In March 2019, the Mueller investigation delivered its final report to attorney general Bill Barr. Even before reading the report, Barr had already made the decision to clear Trump of obstruction of justice. Upon receiving the report, Barr tasked the OLC with preparing a memorandum that would pretextually justify Barr's decision, instead of providing candid counsel. This memorandum was written in tandem with the Barr letter over the course of two days; the final version was signed by Steven Engel and Ed O'Callaghan. The D.C. Circuit held that the memo was not shielded from disclosure by the deliberative process privilege, because then-attorney general Barr had already determined, by the time the memo was written, that DOJ would not charge Trump with a crime, making the memo akin to a "thought experiment."

==== Whistleblower complaint ====
In September 2019, Engel authored an OLC opinion that the Justice Department should not forward the Trump–Ukraine scandal whistleblower complaint to Congress. In an October 2019 letter, 67 inspectors general from the Council of the Inspectors General on Integrity and Efficiency sharply criticized the Justice Department's decision to withhold the complaint from Congress, describing the memo as having a "chilling effect on effective oversight" and being "wrong as a matter of law and policy." The inspectors general recommended the OLC memo be withdrawn or amended because it "effectively overruled the determination by the ICIG regarding an 'urgent concern' complaint" that the ICIG concluded was "credible and therefore needed to be transmitted to Congress."

== List of assistant attorneys general in charge ==
Name	Years served	Appointed by	Notes
Angus D. MacLean	1933–1935	Franklin D. Roosevelt	
Golden W. Bell	1935–1939	Franklin D. Roosevelt	
Charles Fahy	1940–1941	Franklin D. Roosevelt	
Oscar S. Cox	1942–1943	Franklin D. Roosevelt	
Hugh B. Cox	1943–1945	Franklin D. Roosevelt	
Harold W. Judson	1945–1946	Franklin D. Roosevelt	
George T. Washington	1946–1949	Harry Truman	
Abraham J. Harris	1950–1951	Harry Truman	
Joseph C. Duggan	1951–1952	Harry Truman	
J. Lee Rankin	1953–1956	Dwight Eisenhower	Became Solicitor General of the United States in 1956.
W. Wilson White	1957	Dwight Eisenhower	After a short tenure, selected to be first head of the Justice Department's Civil Rights Division.
Malcolm R. Wilkey	1958–1959	Dwight Eisenhower	Later appointed to the United States Court of Appeals for the District of Columbia Circuit and served as United States Ambassador to Uruguay.
Robert Kramer	1959–1961	Dwight Eisenhower	
Nicholas Katzenbach	1961–1962	John F. Kennedy	Served as United States attorney general from 1965 to 1966.
Norbert A. Schlei	1962–1966	John F. Kennedy	
Frank M. Wozencraft	1966–1969	Lyndon Johnson	
William H. Rehnquist	1969–1971	Richard Nixon	Later nominated and confirmed to the Supreme Court of the United States as Associate Justice and later Chief Justice.
Ralph E. Erickson	1971–1972	Richard Nixon	
Roger C. Cramton	1972–1973	Richard Nixon	
Antonin Scalia	1974–1977	Gerald Ford	Later nominated and confirmed as Associate Justice of the U.S. Supreme Court.
John M. Harmon	1977–1981	Jimmy Carter	
Theodore B. Olson	1981–1984	Ronald Reagan	Later became U.S. Solicitor General.
Charles J. Cooper	1985–1988	Ronald Reagan	
Douglas Kmiec	1988–1989	Ronald Reagan	Later U.S. Ambassador to the Republic of Malta during the "Arab Spring" uprisings.
William P. Barr	1989–1990	George H. W. Bush	77th and 85th (until December 2020) attorney general.
Michael Luttig	1990–1991	George H. W. Bush	Appointed to the United States Court of Appeals for the Fourth Circuit in 1991.
Timothy Flanigan	1991–1992	George H. W. Bush	
Walter Dellinger	1993–1996	Bill Clinton	Later became acting U.S. Solicitor General.
Christopher Schroeder	1996	acting	
Dawn Johnsen	1997–1998	acting	First term as acting AAG; also nominated to the role under President Obama but the Senate neglected to take up the nomination
Randolph D. Moss	1998–2001	Bill Clinton	Served as acting AAG from 1998 to 2000; nominated November 9, 1999; recess-appointed August 3, 2000; confirmed by United States Senate December 15, 2000; appointed to the United States District Court for the District of Columbia in 2014.
Jay S. Bybee	2001 – March 2003	George W. Bush	In charge when the OLC issued the Bybee memo and other Torture memos; appointed to the United States Court of Appeals for the Ninth Circuit in March 2003.
Jack Goldsmith	October 2003 – June 2004	George W. Bush	Later Professor at Harvard Law School and author of The Terror Presidency (2007)
Daniel Levin	2004–2005	acting	
Steven G. Bradbury	2005–2009	acting	Served as acting AAG 2005–2007 (nominated June 23, 2005; nomination approved by Senate Judiciary Committee but never voted on by full Senate), continued to function as senior appointed official in charge of OLC until January 20, 2009.
David J. Barron	2009–2010	acting	Professor at Harvard Law School and served as acting AAG from January 2009 to July 2010; appointed to the United States Court of Appeals for the First Circuit in 2014.
Jonathan G. Cedarbaum	2010–2011	acting	Served as acting AAG, July–November 2010; continued to function as senior appointed official in charge of OLC until the end of January 2011.
Caroline D. Krass	2011	acting	Senior appointed official leading OLC since the end of January 2011 until June 2011, when Virginia A. Seitz was confirmed.
Virginia A. Seitz	2011–2013	Barack Obama	Confirmed by the Senate in a voice vote on June 28, 2011. Resigned effective December 20, 2013.
Karl R. Thompson	2014–2017	acting	Appointed Principal Deputy AAG on March 24, 2014.
Curtis E. Gannon	2017	acting	Appointed Principal Deputy AAG on January 20, 2017.
Steven Engel	2017–2021	Donald Trump	
Dawn Johnsen	2021	acting	Second term as acting AAG
Christopher H. Schroeder	2021–2023	Joe Biden	
Benjamin C. Mizer	2023	acting	
Gillian E. Metzger	2023–2024	acting	
Christopher Fonzone	2024–2025	Joe Biden	
Henry C. Whitaker (acting)	2025	Donald Trump	As of February, his name was no longer on the OLC website.
T. Elliot Gaiser	2025–present	Donald Trump	

Only one woman, Obama-appointee Virginia Seitz, has served as the confirmed head of OLC.

=== Political appointees as of 2025 ===
Political appointees at the Office of Legal Counsel include:

- T. Elliot Gaiser, assistant attorney general
- Vacant, principal deputy assistant attorney general
- Vacant, deputy assistant attorney general
- Vacant, deputy assistant attorney general
- Vacant, deputy assistant attorney general

== See also ==
- White House counsel
