= Beth Ann Williams =

American lawyer (born 1979)

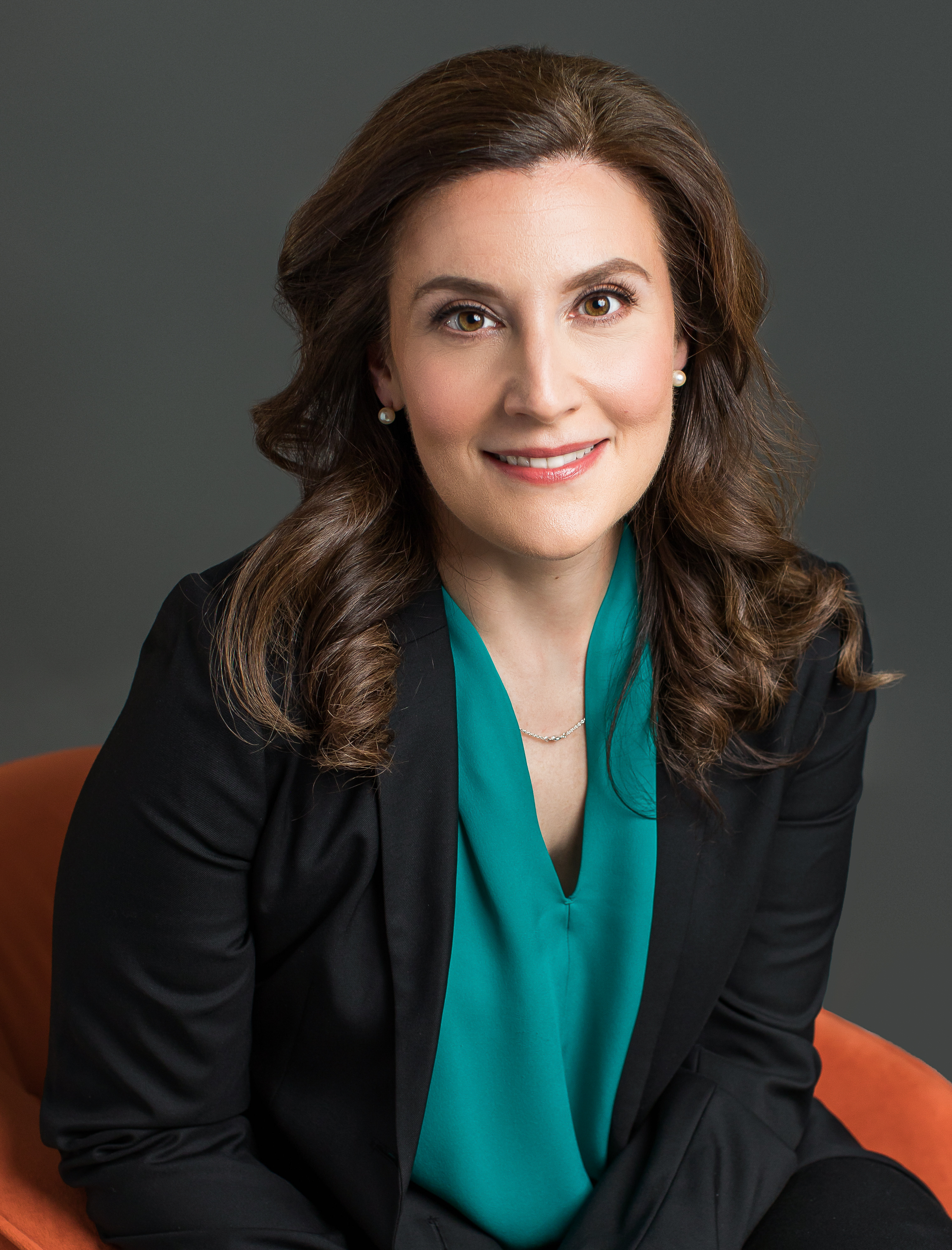

Member of the Privacy and Civil Liberties Oversight Board
- Incumbent
- Assumed office February 23, 2022
- Nominated by: Joe Biden
- Preceded by: Aditya Bamzai

United States Assistant Attorney General for the Office of Legal Policy
- In office August 21, 2017 – December 11, 2020
- President: Donald Trump
- Preceded by: Christopher H. Schroeder
- Succeeded by: Hampton Dellinger

Personal details
- Born: Beth Ann Schonmuller; July 14, 1979 (age 47) Glen Ridge, New Jersey, U.S.
- Party: Republican
- Education: Harvard University (BA, JD)

Beth Ann Williams (née Schonmuller; born July 14, 1979) is an American lawyer who has served as a board member of the Privacy and Civil Liberties Oversight Board since 2022 and was the United States Assistant Attorney General for the Office of Legal Policy from 2017 to 2020. In her role as Assistant Attorney General, Williams served as the primary policy advisor to the United States Attorney General and the United States Deputy Attorney General. Before her governmental work, she was a partner at the law firm of Kirkland & Ellis.

== Early life and education ==
Williams was born on July 14, 1979. She graduated magna cum laude from Harvard College with a Bachelor of Arts degree in history and literature. She received her Juris Doctor from Harvard Law School, where she was president of the school's chapter of the Federalist Society. After completing law school, Williams served as a law clerk to Judge Richard C. Wesley of the United States Court of Appeals for the Second Circuit.

== Career ==
From 2005 to 2006, Williams served as Special Counsel to the United States Senate Committee on the Judiciary. In her role at the Senate Judiciary Committee, Williams assisted with the confirmations of Chief Justice of the United States John Roberts and Associate Justice Samuel Alito.

Williams became a litigation and appellate partner at Kirkland & Ellis, where her practice focused on complex commercial, securities, and First Amendment litigation. She was on the Kirkland team that represented Shirley Sherrod in her defamation lawsuit against Breitbart News. Her pro bono work included a United States Court of Appeals for the Second Circuit appointment to represent Patrick Proctor, a New York state inmate who had been held in solitary confinement for 18 years. Williams won a decision allowing Proctor to proceed with a challenge to his confinement. Williams also crafted six U.S. Supreme Court briefs at the certiorari and merits stages.

On June 12, 2017, President Donald Trump announced that he would nominate Williams to become the next United States Assistant Attorney General for the Office of Legal Policy. She was confirmed by the United States Senate on August 3, 2017, and sworn in on August 21, 2017.

On February 7, 2022, the Senate confirmed her to the PCLOB. She was sworn-in on February 23, 2022.

Legal offices
Preceded by Christopher H. Schroeder	United States Assistant Attorney General for the Office of Legal Policy; 2017–2020	Succeeded by Hampton Dellinger
