= JMD =

JMD may refer to:

- Jamaican dollar, ISO 4217 currency code for the currency of Jamaica
- United States Department of Justice Justice Management Division
