= Gillian E. Metzger =

American constitutional law and administrative law scholar

Assistant Attorney General for the Office of Legal Counsel
- Acting; September 2023 – January 5, 2024
- Preceded by: Benjamin C. Mizer (acting)
- Succeeded by: Christopher Fonzone

Personal details
- Born: October 2, 1965 (age 60)
- Profession: Law professor, government official
- Scientific career
- Education: Yale University (BA); University of Oxford (BPhil); Columbia University (JD)
- Fields: Constitutional law, administrative law, federalism
- Institutions: Columbia Law School

Gillian E. Metzger (born October 2, 1965) is an American legal scholar and a professor of law at Columbia Law School who served in the U.S. Office of Legal Counsel until 2024.

== Early life and education ==
The daughter of Columbia University history professor Walter P. Metzger, Gillian grew up on campus in faculty housing. She earned a bachelor's degree in political science from Yale University in 1987, and then worked as a legislative aide for District Council 37, a local union in New York City. Metzger then earned a Bachelor of Philosophy at the University of Oxford. After several years as a staff analyst for New York City government, Metzger enrolled in Columbia Law School, earning her J.D. degree in 1995.

== Professional career ==
After law school, Metzger first clerked with U.S. Court of Appeals for the District of Columbia Circuit judge Patricia Wald and then clerked for U.S. Supreme Court Associate Justice Ruth Bader Ginsburg.

After completing her clerkship with Ginsburg, Metzger became a staff attorney for the Brennan Center for Justice at the New York University School of Law for several years. During her time at the Brennan Center, Metzger worked on two notable causes: challenging Florida's permanent disenfranchisement of convicted felons and defending campaign finance reform measures. Her work on felon disenfranchisement earned her an invitation to testify before the United States House Committee on the Judiciary on October 21, 1999.

Metzger joined Columbia Law's faculty in 2001. Her areas of expertise are constitutional law, administrative law, federalism, and institutional reform. She also has served as the faculty advisor to the school's American Constitution Society for Law and Policy chapter. She has argued for an expanded reading of Article Four of the United States Constitution.

In 2023 Metzger joined the U.S. Office of Legal Counsel as a deputy assistant attorney general. She served as the Acting Assistant Attorney General before the confirmation of Christopher Fonzone. She is currently on the board of directors of the Columbia Law Review.

== Personal ==
Metzger and her husband, New York City Department of Finance Director of Tax Policy Research Michael Hyman, live on Manhattan's Upper West Side. They have two sons, Oliver and Nathaniel Hyman-Metzger.

== See also ==
- List of law clerks for the sixth seat of the Supreme Court of the United States
