= Paul Corts =

American educator and public official

Paul Corts (born 1943) is an American educator and public official. Most of his career was spent in leadership positions in Christian higher education, including as President of Wingate College and later Palm Beach Atlantic University. He then served as Assistant Attorney General during the George W Bush administration. Later, he served as President of the Council of Christian Colleges and Universities.

He is perhaps most popularly known for his 2005 role in removing the robes that had covered semi-nude statues at the US Department of Justice. His role in this was humorously revisited in the widely read comic strip series "Sylvia."

== Education ==
Paul Corts attended Georgetown College from 1962 to 1965. During his time there, he founded the President's House Association, a non-Greek honors brotherhood. He graduated with a Bachelor of Arts in Communications in 1965. He continued his education at Indiana University Bloomington, obtaining his Masters of Arts and PhD in Communications, Rhetoric, and History in 1968.

== Positions ==
- 1983–1991: President, Wingate College (now Wingate University), Wingate North Carolina
- 1991–2002: President, Palm Beach Atlantic University, West Palm Beach, Florida
- 2002–2006: Assistant Attorney General for Administration, US Department of Justice (United States Department of Justice Justice Management Division)
- 2006–2012: President, Council of Christian Colleges and Universities
