= Curtis E. Gannon =

American lawyer

Curtis Gannon

Acting United States Assistant Attorney General for the Office of Legal Counsel
- In office January 20, 2017 – November 13, 2017
- President: Donald Trump
- Preceded by: Karl R. Thompson (acting)
- Succeeded by: Steven Engel

Personal details
- Born: October 7, 1973 (age 53) Imperial, California, U.S.
- Education: Harvard University (BA); University of London (MA); University of Chicago (JD)
- Gannon's voice Gannon's opening statements to the Supreme Court in Harrington v. Purdue Pharma; Recorded December 4, 2023

Curtis E. Gannon (born October 7, 1973) is an American lawyer. He is a deputy solicitor general, a career position, in the Office of the Solicitor General of the United States. He previously served as the principal deputy assistant attorney general for the Office of Legal Counsel of the United States Department of Justice. He was appointed to this position on January 20, 2017, by President Donald Trump.

== Early life and education ==
Gannon graduated from Harvard University in 1994 and earned his master's degree at University of London, before earning a J.D. from the University of Chicago Law School (where he was an editor of the University of Chicago Law Review) in 1998.

== Legal career ==
Prior to assuming office as acting head of the Office of Legal Counsel, Gannon was assistant to the Solicitor General. Before that, Gannon was in private practice at Gibson, Dunn & Crutcher. Gannon clerked for Supreme Court Justice Antonin Scalia during the 2004 Term, and Fifth Circuit Judge Edith Jones.

In 2014, Gannon argued the work shift case of Integrity Staffing Solutions, Inc. v. Busk on behalf of the Government. During oral arguments, Justice Kagan posed a hypothetical to him: There was a federal judge in New York "ages ago . . . who had his clerks — all that they did was help him with his opinions and his cases and that was their principal activity — but had his clerks come early in order to cut his grapefruit and otherwise make breakfast for him." Is cutting grapefruit compensable? The identity of the judge whose clerks prepared grapefruit was later revealed as Edward Weinfeld of the U.S. District Court for the Southern District of New York.

On January 27, 2017, Gannon issued a memorandum approving the legality of Executive Order 13769, the controversial "refugee ban" limiting immigration from seven countries.

Upon the confirmation of Steven Engel on November 7, 2017, Gannon's tenure as Acting Assistant Attorney General concluded. In August 2020, he returned to the Office of the Solicitor General as a career Deputy.

Gannon is a member of the American Law Institute.

== See also ==
- List of law clerks for the ninth seat of the Supreme Court of the United States
