= Karl R. Thompson =

American lawyer

Acting Assistant Attorney General for the Office of Legal Counsel
- In office March 24, 2014 – January 20, 2017
- Preceded by: Virginia A. Seitz
- Succeeded by: Curtis E. Gannon (acting)

Personal details
- Born: Karl Remón Thompson
- Education: Harvard University (BA); University of Cambridge (PhD); University of Chicago (JD)
- Profession: Lawyer

Karl R. Thompson is an American lawyer and was the Principal Deputy Assistant Attorney General for the Office of Legal Counsel of the United States Department of Justice from 2014 until 20 January 2017; he served as the Acting Assistant Attorney General during that period.

== Education ==
Thompson received his Bachelor of Arts from Harvard University in 1991, a Doctor of Philosophy from the University of Cambridge in 1998, and his J.D. degree from the University of Chicago Law School with high honors in 2000.

== Career ==
Thompson clerked for Judge David S. Tatel of the U.S. Court of Appeals for the D.C. Circuit and for Justice Ruth Bader Ginsburg of the U.S. Supreme Court during the 2002 Term. He worked in private practice at the law firm O'Melveny & Myers, specializing in international and appellate litigation. He then joined the Office of Legal Counsel as Counsel to the Assistant Attorney General. He later became Deputy Assistant Attorney General and also served as Counselor to the Attorney General. In March 2014, he became Principal Deputy Assistant Attorney General of the Office of Legal Counsel, serving as the acting head of the office.

== Controversy ==
In late 2009 the New York Post and the Washington Times started to criticize the Obama Presidency for its employment of lawyers who had helped provide legal assistance to Guantanamo captives. At first the New York Post and the Washington Times only named two of the nine lawyers they were reporting had "aided terrorists". But March 2010 the other seven had been named, including Thompson.

Thompson was one of nine lawyers whose appointment these commentators criticized. On March 9, 2010, Thompson's boss at O'Melveny & Myers, Walter Dellinger, described asking Thompson to aid Lieutenant Commander William Kuebler in preparing his defense for Canadian Guantanamo captive Omar Khadr. According to Dellinger Thompson's assistance on the Khadr case lasted several months, and was conducted in parallel with Thompson's prior duties with the firm.

Lawyers and commentators from across the political spectrum came forward to defend Thompson and the other appointees who had been singled out for criticism.

On May 24, 2010, the Vancouver Sun reported that the Canwest News Service had recently learned that there was internal controversy within the Obama administration over new rules for conducting Guantanamo military commissions. A new 281 page manual was prepared, to update the commissions to comply with changes following the passage of the Military Commissions Act of 2009. Edwards wrote that the change would have triggered dropping charges against a third of the Guantanamo captives the Prosecution planned to charge with murder.

Edwards noted that persons from OLC sought an edit to get new rules. Edwards also noted that OLC employed two lawyers including Thompson, who had been dubbed members of the "Al Qaeda 7" because they had worked on behalf of terrorism suspects prior to joining the government. The article does not state, however, that Thompson played any role in this matter or any role in seeking these edits.

=== Inspector General access ===
In July 2015, Thompson signed a legal opinion regarding the Department of Justice Inspector General's access to certain narrow classes of information protected by the Federal Wiretap Act, Federal Rule of Criminal Procedure 6(e) (which deals with grand jury matters), and section 626 of the Fair Credit Reporting Act. These laws protect highly sensitive information such as the contents of wiretapped private phone conversations, confidential grand jury testimony, and private credit, banking, and employment information obtained by the FBI. The opinion concludes that the Inspector General's access to such information is controlled by the terms of these laws, which say the Department "must not disclose," "may not disseminate," or would violate the law by disclosing the information except as specified in these laws, rather than by the terms of the Inspector General Act, which says the Department shall grant the Inspector General access to "all records" available to the Department.

The opinion also concludes that, under the terms of these laws, the Inspector General can obtain protected information for use in reviews of the Department's law enforcement operations (including misconduct investigations), but not for use in connection with reviews (like routine financial audits) that have no significant connection to the Department's conduct of its law enforcement functions. The opinion further concludes that when the Inspector General seeks access to protected information under these laws, a determination must be made that the investigation is related to the Department's law enforcement activities. In the case of wiretap and consumer credit information, the opinion does not say who must make that determination. In the case of grand jury information, the opinion concludes that, under the plain language of the Rules of Criminal Procedure, a government prosecutor must determine that the information can be shared. This involves an objective determination about whether the Inspector General's investigation is related to law enforcement, not a discretionary determination about whether the prosecutor feels that the Inspector General should receive the information. To date no documents have been ultimately denied but the OIG has complained that the need to comply with the terms of these laws is contrary to the letter and the spirit of the IG Act and has delayed the issuance of reports critical of the Justice Department.

== See also ==
- List of law clerks for the sixth seat of the Supreme Court of the United States
