= Thomas Raeburn White =

American lawyer

- Born: August 30, 1875; Rich Square, Indiana
- Died: December 16, 1959 (aged 84); Penllyn, Pennsylvania
- Education: Earlham College; Penn Law
- Occupations: Attorney and political reformer
- Children: 3, incl. W. Wilson White

Thomas Raeburn White (1875–1959) was a prominent attorney, political reformer, newspaper publisher and law professor in Philadelphia, Pennsylvania. He practiced law at White and Williams LLP, wrote extensively on the Pennsylvania Constitution and taught at the University of Pennsylvania School of Law.

== Personal life ==
White was born on August 30, 1875, in Rich Square, Indiana. White graduated from Earlham College before attending the University of Pennsylvania Law School. In 1901, White married Elizabeth Wilson, she died in 1921. They had three children Mary, W. Wilson White and Thomas Raeburn White Jr. In 1924 he married Dorothy Shipley (b.1896-d.2001), author, journalist and lecturer, who was educated at Bryn Mawr College, at Columbia University, and received her doctorate from the University of Pennsylvania. She brought three children of her own to the family.

== Professional life ==
White graduated from University of Pennsylvania Law School in 1899 and was admitted to the bar that year. Throughout his professional life he was a partner in the law firm of White and Williams LLP, which he founded in 1899. Although he was technically retired he continued to visit the office regularly and counsel younger attorneys until his death. He died in Penllyn, Pennsylvania, on December 16, 1959.

== Political reformer ==
In 1905 the Committee of Seventy, a good government group in Philadelphia, Pennsylvania, selected White as their counsel. In this capacity he investigated voting fraud and political crime.

== Published works ==
Commentaries on the Constitution

Business Law: A Text-Book for Schools and Colleges
