= Barr letter =

2019 letter from William Barr about the Mueller report

The four-page letter Attorney General William Barr sent to leaders of the House and Senate judiciary committees on March 24, 2019. It claims to describe the principal conclusions of the Special Counsel investigation.

The Barr letter is a four-page letter sent on March 24, 2019, from Attorney General William Barr to leaders of the House and Senate Judiciary Committees purportedly detailing the "principal conclusions" of the Mueller report of the Special Counsel investigation led by Robert Mueller into Russian efforts to interfere in the 2016 United States presidential election, allegations of conspiracy or coordination between Donald Trump's presidential campaign and Russia, and allegations of obstruction of justice.

Even before seeing the Mueller report, Barr had already decided to clear Trump of obstruction. To this end, he tasked the Office of Legal Counsel with writing a memo that would justify this decision. The Barr letter was written over the course of two days in tandem with the legal memo on which the letter ostensibly relied.

After the release of the redacted report on April 18, 2019, Barr's letter was criticized as a deliberate mischaracterization of the Mueller Report and its conclusions, and as an attempt at spinning the media narrative to undermine Mueller's investigation. In March 2020, a federal judge sharply criticized Barr's characterizations and ordered the Justice Department to provide him the redacted portions from the public version of the report so he could determine if they were justified. Following litigation under the Freedom of Information Act, the Justice Department released the full text of the memorandum in August 2022.

== Background ==
On May 17, 2017, Deputy Attorney General Rod Rosenstein appointed a special counsel, Robert Mueller, to investigate Russian interference in the 2016 presidential election and "any matters that arose or may arise directly from the investigation". Mueller concluded his investigations and sent a 448-page written report to Attorney General William Barr on March 22, 2019.

The March 24, 2019 Office of Legal Counsel memo.

Barr tasked the Office of Legal Counsel (OLC) in the Department of Justice with authoring a memo that would justify the decision Barr had already made to clear Trump of obstruction. The group authored both the memo and Barr letter in tandem over the course of two days; the final memo was signed by Steven Engel and Ed O'Callaghan.

On March 24, Barr sent a four-page letter to the leaders of the House and Senate Judiciary Committees detailing what he said were the report's principal conclusions on Russian interference in the 2016 presidential election, allegations of coordination between Donald Trump's presidential campaign and Russia, and allegations of obstruction of justice.

On April 18, 2019, the Department of Justice released to the public a two-volume redacted version of Report on the Investigation into Russian Interference in the 2016 Presidential Election, informally known as the "Mueller report".

== Contents ==
Barr's letter describes the conclusions investigated by the Special Counsel investigation. It is split into two sections: Russian interference in the 2016 presidential election and allegations of obstruction of justice.

=== Russian interference in the 2016 presidential election ===
Barr's letter mentioned two methods found by the special counsel that Russia tried to do to influence the 2016 presidential election. First method: disinformation through social media campaigns by the Internet Research Agency (IRA) "to sow social discord"; and secondly, hacking computers for emails that came from the 2016 Clinton presidential campaign and Democratic National Committee.

Barr quoted the report as saying the "investigation did not establish that members of the Trump Campaign conspired or coordinated with the Russian government in its election interference activities."

=== Obstruction of justice ===
Barr wrote that the special counsel "did not draw a conclusion – one way or the other – as to whether the examined conduct constituted obstruction" and that "The Special Counsel's decision to describe the facts of his obstruction investigation without reaching any legal conclusions leaves it to the Attorney General to determine whether the conduct described in the report constitutes a crime". Barr concluded on obstruction of justice by saying: "Deputy Attorney General Rod Rosenstein and I have concluded that the evidence developed during the Special Counsel's investigation is not sufficient to establish that the President committed an obstruction-of-justice offense".

== Comparison between Barr memo and Barr letter ==
After the Barr letter was released, media commentators have pointed out that previously in June 2018, Barr (who was not working for the government then) wrote an unsolicited 19-page memo to the Department of Justice protesting that Mueller's investigation of President Trump for obstruction is "legally insupportable", and "fatally misconceived". The memo continued by saying that Trump was within his power to firstly ask then-FBI Director James Comey to stop investigating Michael Flynn, first and former National Security Advisor to Trump, and to secondly fire Comey. Barr further wrote that it would be detrimental to the institution of the presidency if Trump were accused of a crime when he fired Comey, a subordinate.

Both the 2018 memo and the Barr letter argued that an underlying crime (in this case, "related to Russian election interference") was needed for obstruction to occur. Democrats referred to the memo in suggesting that Barr's decision on obstruction was biased. Time magazine said "Barr has already realized some of Democrats' biggest fears", then went on to describe the memo. USA Today wrote that Barr's decision in the letter "rekindled concerns among Democratic lawmakers" about the memo, while CNN wrote that the Barr letter gave the memo "heightened relevance". Deputy Attorney General Rod Rosenstein previously said that the memo had "no impact on the investigation", but The Guardian points to the memo as why Barr's decision on obstruction in the letter is "controversial".

The New Yorker wrote that in light of Barr's decision in the Barr letter, the memo raises questions on whether Barr should have recused from the special counsel investigation, as it has already done before when Barr was nominated for Attorney General. The Los Angeles Times wrote that Barr used similar reasoning in both the 2018 memo and Barr letter, while NPR similarly wrote that the memo which "was a precursor to" the Barr letter. Regarding the decision on obstruction in the Barr letter, The Washington Post wrote that the memo "suggests Barr didn't think there was much of a case in the first place", while The Irish Times wrote that "Barr already made his views clear" earlier in the memo.

== Comparison of findings between Barr letter and Mueller Report ==
After the release of the redacted report, Barr's letter was criticized as a deliberate mischaracterization of the Mueller Report and its conclusions, and as an attempt at spinning the media narrative to undermine Mueller's investigation. Numerous legal analysts concluded that Barr's letter did not accurately portray some of the findings of the investigation, casting Trump in a better light than was intended in the report. The New York Times reported instances in which the Barr letter omitted information and quoted sentence fragments out of context in ways that significantly altered the findings in the report, including:

- Omission of language that indicated Trump could be subject to indictment after leaving office, inaccurately suggesting that Trump was "totally exonerated".
- A sentence fragment described only one possible motive for Trump to obstruct justice, while the Mueller Report listed multiple possible motives.
- Omission of words and a full sentence that twice suggested there was knowing and complicit behavior between the Trump campaign and Russians that stopped short of direct coordination, which may constitute conspiracy.

CNN wrote that while Barr in his letter took it upon himself to deliver a ruling on whether Trump had committed obstruction, the redacted report indicates that Mueller intended that decision to be made by Congress, not Barr.

Numerous other political and legal analysts, including Bob Woodward and Brian Williams, observed significant differences in what Barr said about Mueller's findings in his letter, and in his April 18 press conference, compared to what the Mueller Report actually found. This commentary included a comparison of Barr to Baghdad Bob, calling him "Baghdad Bill".

Barr wrote that his letter provided "the principal conclusions" of the Mueller Report. Ryan Goodman, a professor at the New York University School of Law and co-editor of Just Security, observed that in 1989, Barr also wrote a letter which he stated contained "the principal conclusions" of a controversial legal opinion "that the FBI could forcibly abduct people in other countries without the consent of the foreign state" when he worked on as head of the OLC. Barr declined to provide the full opinion to Congress, but it was later subpoenaed and released to the public, showing that the 1989 letter did not fully disclose the principal conclusions.

== Reactions ==
=== Robert Mueller ===
Letter from Robert Mueller III to William P. Barr objecting to Barr's characterization of the conclusions of the Mueller Report

On March 25, a day after the Barr letter was released, Robert Mueller himself reportedly wrote a letter to Barr, as described in the New York Times as "expressing his and his team's concerns that the attorney general had inadequately portrayed their conclusions". In USA Today it was described that Mueller "expressed his differences with Barr".

On March 27, Mueller sent Barr another letter describing his concerns of Barr's letter to Congress and the public on March 24. Mueller thought that Barr's letter "did not fully capture the context, nature, and substance" of the findings. "There is now public confusion about critical aspects of the results of our investigation. This threatens to undermine a central purpose for which the Department appointed the Special Counsel: to assure full public confidence in the outcome of the investigations." Mueller also requested Barr release the Mueller Report's introductions and executive summaries. This was first reported on April 30, 2019.

Letter from Attorney General William P. Barr on March 29 to the chairs of the House and Senate Judiciary Committees

The next day on March 28, Mueller had a phone conversation with Barr and reportedly expressed concerns about public misunderstandings of the obstruction investigation due to a lack of context released by Barr's letter. In their phone conversation, Barr reportedly said that his letter was not intended to be a summary, but rather only as a description of the principal findings of Mueller's report, and said he preferred not to release more information until a more complete redacted version of the report could be prepared. Barr then sent a subsequent letter to Congress in which he reiterated that his letter had not been intended as a summary of the Mueller Report and volunteered to testify before Congress in early May.

=== Some members of the special counsel team ===
On April 3, 2019, some members of the Mueller investigation team, who spoke on condition of anonymity, expressed concerns to the press that Barr's letter did not accurately portray some of the findings of the investigation, casting Trump in a better light than was intended in the report.

=== President Donald Trump ===
On Barr's decision to clear him on obstruction, Trump said in late April 2019 that Barr read the Mueller Report "and he made a decision right on the spot. No obstruction."

=== Members of Congress ===
In a joint statement, Democrats House Speaker Nancy Pelosi and Senate Minority Leader Chuck Schumer said that Barr is "not a neutral observer". They also said that Barr's past "bias" against the special counsel (Barr's memo) showed that he was "not in a position to make objective determinations".

In May 2019, Republican US Representative Justin Amash (who in July 2019 became an Independent) stated "it is clear that Barr intended to mislead the public about Special Counsel Robert Mueller's analysis and findings", adding, "Barr's misrepresentations are significant but often subtle, frequently taking the form of sleight-of-hand qualifications or logical fallacies, which he hopes people will not notice."

In his own statement, Republican House Minority Leader Kevin McCarthy declared, based on the conclusions in the Barr Letter and the vast scope and resources made available to Mueller, that "This case is closed." McCarthy emphasized a need to move on from the investigation "after months upon months of manufactured outrage."

== Freedom of Information Act Litigation ==
In 2019, following the release of the Barr letter, several parties, including Jason Leopold, Electronic Privacy Information Center and Citizens for Responsibility and Ethics in Washington, filed records requests under the Freedom of Information Act regarding the Justice Department's handling of the Mueller report, including the internal Office of Legal Counsel memorandum that recommended against charging Trump. The Department of Justice refused to release the memorandum and related records, citing the doctrine of deliberative process privilege and attorney-client privilege, a decision which the filers appealed in court.

On March 5, 2020, Reggie Walton, a senior judge of the D.C. district court, sharply criticized Barr's characterizations of the Mueller Report as "distorted" and "misleading" and called "into question Attorney General Barr's credibility and, in turn, the department's" representations to the Court. Walton asked if Barr's characterizations were a "calculated attempt" to help the president. He ordered the Justice Department to show him the redacted portions from the public version of the report so he could determine if they were justified.

In May 2021, D.C. district court judge Amy Berman Jackson ordered the release of the OLC memo supporting the Barr letter, criticizing Barr's characterizations of the Mueller report as "disingenuous" and ruling that deliberative process privilege did not apply because "[t]he review of the document reveals that the Attorney General was not then engaged in making a decision about whether the President should be charged with obstruction of justice; the fact that he would not be prosecuted was a given." The Justice Department appealed this decision, and in August 2022, a three-judge panel of the D.C. Circuit Court of Appeals unanimously upheld Jackson's order, ruling that Barr had never considered charging Trump and likened the memo to a "thought experiment"; the Department of Justice released the full memo the following week.

== See also ==
- Mueller Report § Mueller Report findings compared to Barr letter
