= Committee of Seventy =

Advocate for better government in Philadelphia

- Founded: 1904
- Purpose: Clean and effective government. Fair Elections. Informed Citizens.
- Location(s): 123 South Broad St., Suite 2830; Philadelphia, Pennsylvania, US
- Region served: Philadelphia and five suburban counties
- President and CEO: Lauren Cristella
- Website: http://www.seventy.org/

The Committee of Seventy is an independent, nonpartisan, nonprofit organization which advocates for the improvement of government in Philadelphia and Pennsylvania. Founded in 1904, its board of directors is made up of 70 business, legal, and civic leaders. The Committee of Seventy focuses on issues such as elections and voting, campaign finance, ethics and transparency, and redistricting.

== History ==
On December 19, 1904, an initial Committee of Seven was formed with the goal of getting competent and honest people into government in Philadelphia, improving voting, fighting corruption, and keeping people informed and involved in the important issues of the day. The initial seven members were soap manufacturer Samuel Simeon Fels, attorney Frank P. Prichard, Dr. George Stanley Woodward, William Henry Pfahler, J. Percy Keating, trade unionist Alfred D. Clavert, and dry-goods merchant Frederic H. Strawbridge. In January 1905, this core group expanded to form the ongoing Committee of Seventy, "to keep watch and ward over the public interests". New members included engineer Morris Llewellyn Cooke, book publisher John C. Winston, banker George Washington Norris, dye manufacturer Joseph Henry Scattergood, Quaker merchant Joshua Longstreth Baily, William W. Justice, William H. Jenks, Louis Childs Madeira, Walter Wood, Francis B. Reeves, and lawyer Russell Duane.

For the 1905 election, the Committee originally intended to recommend a slate of candidates. However, in some cases they found no candidates that met their standards. The group then formed a "City Party", which entered fifteen candidates for magisterial posts. They built support among press, civic and religious organizations for broad reforms, challenging candidates from the entrenched Republican political machine. In the county elections of November 1904 the reformers won strongly, gaining (for a time) support from Mayor John Weaver, and putting pressure on the state government to enact reform legislation. The election of Rudolph Blankenburg as Mayor of Philadelphia in 1911 was seen as a major achievement of the Committee of Seventy. Blankenburg headed a nonpartisan administration that focused on the businesslike provision of city services, cutting costs while improving schools, hospitals and transit. However, in 1915, Republican Thomas B. Smith defeated reform candidate George D. Porter.

The Committee of Seventy independently investigated electoral fraud, through the work of their counsel Thomas Raeburn White. Members reviewed electoral lists, and were instrumental in introducing legislation to reduce voter fraud. They contributed significantly to changes made to the civil service and the passage of the Philadelphia Home Rule Charters of 1919 and 1951. By the mid-century, the Committee of Seventy had broadened its focus to include public policy and civic education.

The Committee of Seventy provides information and analysis about Philadelphia's political culture and government. From 2005 to 2018, the Committee of Seventy led fights to defend campaign financing limits, including a lawsuit initiated by Seventy that was eventually heard by the Supreme Court of Pennsylvania, to implement tough new public ethics laws, and to sever the tie between contracts and political contributions in Philadelphia.

In 2018, the Committee of Seventy launched Draw the Lines PA, leading a coalition of academic and civic groups that developed its own redistricting map based on 1,500 submissions. Patrick Christmas, policy director of the organization, has raised concerns about the use of dark money in Philadelphia elections. The organization has also proposed amending Philadelphia's Home Rule Charter to address concerns about the Philadelphia Sheriff’s Office.

== Name ==
The name comes from the Bible. From the organization's website, "Chronicling the Israelites’ journey through the desert, Exodus tells of seventy elders who were appointed to assist Moses in the governance of the people." The references appear in Exodus 24:1–9, in which God instructs Moses on how to proceed once Israel accepts the Covenant: "And he said unto Moses, Come up unto the Lord, thou, and Aaron, Nadab, and Abihu, and seventy of the elders of Israel; and worship ye afar off." In 1905, this Philadelphia Committee of Seventy was so named to serve an analogous function: "to be the ethical backbone of a city forgetting its conscience." An organization of the same name and derivation already existed in 19th-century New York City.

== Organization and leadership ==
The Committee of Seventy has a Board made up of more than 70 civic, business, labor, and nonprofit leaders. Its current Chair is Eric Kraeutler, a retired Partner at the law firm of Morgan, Lewis & Bockius. Lauren Cristella has served as the president and CEO since June 6, 2023, when she became its first woman president and CEO. She succeeded Al Schmidt, a civic leader in Philadelphia and a former Philadelphia City Commissioner, who left the organization in January 2023 to serve as the Pennsylvania Secretary of State. In 2024, Schmidt was named to lead the Pennsylvania Governor's Election Threats Task Force. David Thornburgh led the Committee of Seventy from December 2014 to January 2022.

== Publications ==
The Committee of Seventy provides nonpartisan information on a variety of issues related to government and politics, traditionally focusing on elections and voting, campaign finance, ethics and transparency, and redistricting.

== Funding ==
The Committee of Seventy is an independent, non-profit organization that depends on charitable donations to advance its mission for better government in Philadelphia and Pennsylvania. Seventy's IRS Form 990s are available on their website.

== Archives ==
- Committee of Seventy Photograph Collection | Temple University ArchivesSpace
