= Norbert A. Schlei =

American lawyer and government official (1929–2003)

United States Assistant Attorney General for the Office of Legal Counsel
- In office 1962–1966
- President: John F. Kennedy; Lyndon B. Johnson
- Preceded by: Nicholas Katzenbach
- Succeeded by: Frank M. Wozencraft

Personal details
- Born: June 14, 1929
- Died: April 17, 2003 (aged 73)
- Party: Democratic

Nobert Anthony Schlei (1929–2003) was an American lawyer who served as Assistant Attorney General for the Office of Legal Counsel at the United States Department of Justice from 1962 to 1966. In this role, he helped draft major legislation including the Civil Rights Act of 1964. He was an unsuccessful Democratic candidate for the California state legislature in 1962 and for Secretary of State of California in 1966.

== Early life ==
Schlei was born on June 14, 1929 in Dayton, Ohio. In 1950, he graduated from Ohio State University with a degree in English literature and international relations. He served as a naval officer during the Korean War. After the war, he attended Yale Law School, becoming the editor of The Yale Law Journal, graduating in 1956.

== Career ==
After graduating from law school, Schlei served as a clerk for Supreme Court Justice John Marshall Harlan from 1956 to 1957. He then practiced law in Los Angeles and became the Democratic nominee for the 57th district in the California State Assembly in the 1962 election.

In August 1962, President John F. Kennedy appointed Schlei as Assistant Attorney General in charge of the Office of Legal Counsel in the Department of Justice. He succeeded Nicholas Katzenbach, who was appointed Deputy Attorney General. As there was no mechanism for a candidate to withdraw at this stage, Schlei's name remained on the ballot in the California State Assembly election, which he later lost to incumbent Republican Charles Conrad.

Shortly after his appointment at the Office of Legal Counsel, he was sent to Mississippi to help the administration's response to the University of Mississippi's refusal to enroll James Meredith. During the Cuban Missile Crisis, Schlei was tasked with developing a legal justification for a naval blockade of military equipment shipments to Cuba. Kennedy's announcement of a blockade (which the administration called a "quarantine") on October 22, 1962, drew on Schlei's reasoning. As Assistant Attorney General, Schlei drafted several proposed bills for the Kennedy and Johnson administrations, including the bills that would eventually become the Civil Rights Act of 1964, the Economic Opportunity Act of 1964, and the Voting Rights Act of 1965. Schlei was part of a group of Justice Department officials who worked closely together on civil rights issues during the 1960s, including Katzenbach, Burke Marshall, John Doar, and Harold F. Reis.

Schlei left the Department of Justice in 1966 to run for Secretary of State of California. He defeated six other candidates in the Democratic primary but lost to incumbent Republican Frank M. Jordan. In the 1968 presidential election, he served as a delegate to the Democratic National Convention and was in the room during the assassination of Robert F. Kennedy.

After his 1966 election defeat, Schlei returned to private practice as a trial and securities lawyer. In 1995, Schlei was charged with fraud, conspiracy, and money laundering for his alleged role in the sale of fake Japanese government bonds worth $16 billion. He was acquitted of some of the charges but convicted of conspiracy and securities fraud. The conviction was vacated by the 11th Circuit Court of Appeals, and although Schlei maintained his innocence, he agreed to a negotiated settlement and plead guilty to a misdemeanor instead of facing retrial.

== Personal life ==
In March 2002, Schlei was jogging in Santa Monica, California, where he suffered a heart attack, which left him "virtually unconscious" for over a year until his death on April 17, 2003.

He was married three times and is survived by his third wife, Joan, and his three daughters and three sons.
