= Steven Engel =

American lawyer (born 1974)

Steve Engel
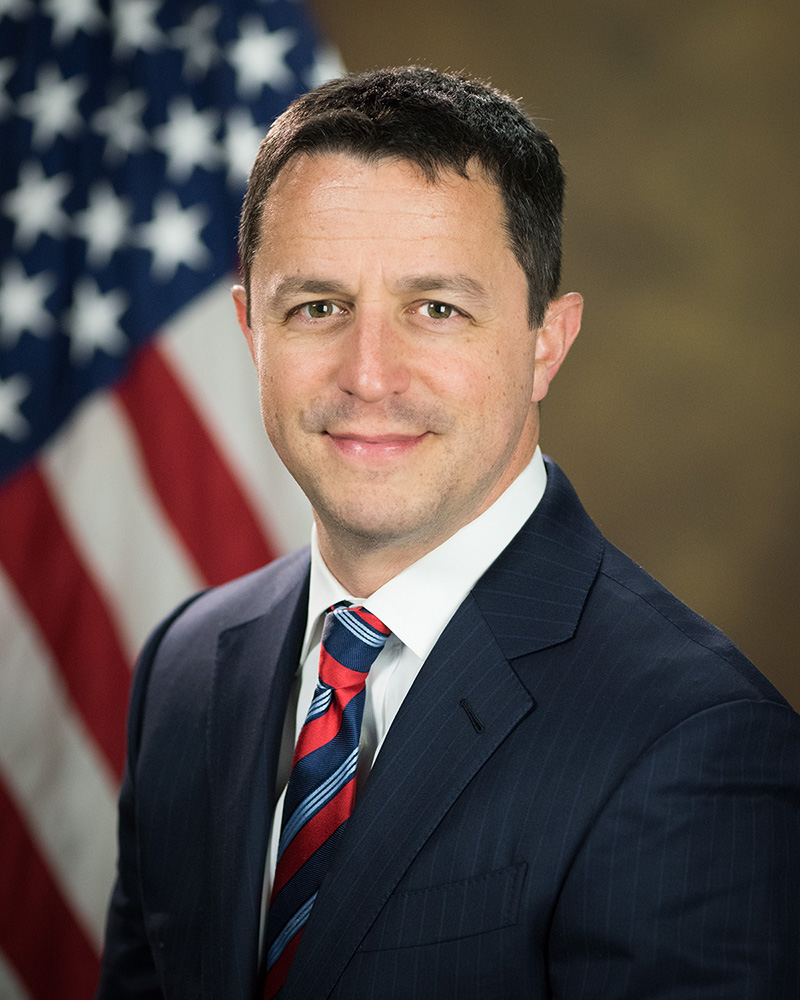
- Official portrait, 2018

United States Assistant Attorney General for the Office of Legal Counsel
- In office November 13, 2017 – January 20, 2021
- President: Donald Trump
- Preceded by: Curtis E. Gannon
- Succeeded by: Christopher H. Schroeder

Personal details
- Born: Steven Andrew Engel; June 29, 1974 (age 52) New Hyde Park, New York, U.S.
- Party: Republican
- Spouse: Susan Kearns (m. 2004)
- Education: Harvard University (BA); University of Cambridge (MPhil); Yale University (JD)

Steven Andrew Engel (born June 29, 1974) is an American lawyer. He served as the United States assistant attorney general for the Office of Legal Counsel in the first Trump administration. Engel, who previously worked in the George W. Bush administration as deputy assistant attorney general in the Office of Legal Counsel, was nominated by President Donald Trump on January 31, 2017, and confirmed on November 7, 2017.

== Early life and education ==
Engel was born on June 29, 1974, in New Hyde Park, New York, a Long Island suburb of New York City. He was raised in Port Washington, New York, and graduated as valedictorian from Paul D. Schreiber Senior High School in 1992. He then earned a bachelor's degree summa cum laude from Harvard University in 1996.

From 1996 to 1997, Engel was a Knox Fellow at the University of Cambridge. He attended Yale Law School afterwards and earned a Juris Doctor in 2000. He then clerked for Judge Alex Kozinski of the United States Court of Appeals for the Ninth Circuit, followed by a clerkship under Justice Anthony Kennedy of the Supreme Court of the United States.

== Career ==
Engel practiced law at Kirkland & Ellis from 2002 to 2006 before serving as deputy assistant attorney general at the Office of Legal Counsel during the George W. Bush administration from 2006 to 2009. In June 2009, Engel became a partner at Dechert, an international law firm.

=== Office of Legal Counsel ===
On January 31, 2017, the White House announced that President Donald Trump intended to nominate Engel to serve as the Assistant Attorney General heading the Office of Legal Counsel. Engel's nomination was opposed by U.S. Senator John McCain, a former prisoner of war who was tortured while in captivity. McCain cited Engel's involvement in commenting on and reviewing one of the so-called "Torture memos" that signed off on six different "enhanced interrogation techniques." Various human rights groups expressed concerns about Engel's nomination, also citing his involvement with the July 20, 2007, memo authored by Steven G. Bradbury, then-head of the OLC. The Senate Judiciary Committee received support for the nomination from former Attorneys General Mukasay and Gonzales, other former senior executive branch officials, and the Patrolmen's Benevolent Association of the City of New York. Engel was confirmed by a 51–47 vote, largely along party lines with one Democrat, Senator Joe Manchin (West Virginia), voting in favor of confirmation.

In November 2017, Engel issued an opinion supporting the President's appointment of Mick Mulvaney as the acting director of the Consumer Financial Protection Bureau under the Vacancies Reform Act.

Engel approved April 2018 missile strikes against Syria launched by President Trump against facilities associated with Syria's chemical-weapons program without congressional authorization.

The March 24, 2019 Office of Legal Counsel memo.

In March 2019, the special counsel investigation led by Robert Mueller released its findings, the Mueller report, to Attorney General William Barr. Barr tasked the Office of Legal Counsel with authoring a memorandum that would justify the decision Barr had already made to clear Trump on the charges of obstruction of justice. This memorandum was written in tandem with the Barr letter over the course of two days; the final version was signed by Engel and Ed O'Callaghan. The DOJ initially kept the memo secret. The watchdog organization Citizens for Responsibility and Ethics in Washington launched a Freedom of Information Act suit against the Justice Department, and the U.S. Court of Appeals for the D.C. Circuit, in August 2022, ordered the memo's public release. The D.C. Circuit held that the memo was not shielded from disclosure by the deliberative process privilege, because then-Attorney General Barr had already determined, by the time the memo was written, that DOJ would not charge Trump with a crime, making the memo akin to a "thought experiment."

In May 2019, Engel issued an opinion concluding that the former White House Counsel, Don McGahn, was immune from compelled congressional testimony. The House Judiciary Committee challenged that decision, and Engel's opinion was rejected by U.S. District Judge Ketanji Brown Jackson, who was later nominated by Joe Biden to the D.C. Circuit Court of Appeals. Jackson's opinion was twice reversed by a three-judge panel of the D.C. Circuit.

In June 2019, Engel issued an OLC opinion supporting the Justice Department's decision not to release Donald Trump's tax returns.

In September 2019, Engel authored the OLC opinion of the Justice Department to not forward the Trump–Ukraine scandal whistleblower complaint to Congress. The Council of the Inspectors General on Integrity and Efficiency concluded that Engel's opinion had a "chilling effect on effective oversight" and was "wrong as a matter of law and policy"; urging him to withdraw or modify it. Engel responded that the opinion had simply applied the law as it was written and that it did not construe the statutory provisions protecting whistleblowers.

Engel's November 3, 2019 letter

In a letter dated November 3, 2019, Engel argued that White House advisors have "absolute immunity" from being subpoenaed to testify in the impeachment inquiry against Donald Trump.

On September 9, 2020, President Donald Trump identified Engel among a list of potential future nominees to the Supreme Court.

In January 2021, after then-President Donald Trump's re-election bid failed, Trump undertook a number of unprecedented acts to overturn the 2020 election, including a pressure campaign to request the Justice Department to falsely claim fraud and invalidate the results of the election in key battleground states. Engel, along with Richard Donoghue and others, refused to carry out the scheme and reportedly threatened to resign if he replaced acting Attorney General Jeffrey Rosen with Assistant Attorney General Jeffrey Clark in an effort to overturn the election. On June 23, 2022, Engel testified in the fifth public hearing of the United States House Select Committee on the January 6 Attack.

=== Private practice ===
In May 2021, Dechert LLP announced that Engel had rejoined their law firm as a partner.

== Personal life ==
Engel married Susan Kearns in 2004. They met while working as co-clerks to Judge Kozinski, and both served as clerks on the Supreme Court during the 2001 term, with Kearns clerking for Justice Antonin Scalia.

== See also ==
- Donald Trump Supreme Court candidates
- List of law clerks for the first seat of the Supreme Court of the United States

Legal offices
Preceded by Virginia A. Seitz	United States Assistant Attorney General for the Office of Legal Counsel; 2017–2021	Succeeded by Christopher H. Schroeder
