= Daniel E. Burrows =

- Official portrait, 2026

United States Assistant Attorney General for the Office of Legal Policy
- Incumbent
- Assumed office February 17, 2026
- President: Donald Trump
- Preceded by: Aaron Reitz

Deputy Assistant to the President and White House Deputy Staff Secretary
- In office January 20, 2025 – February 17, 2026
- President: Donald Trump
- Preceded by: William McGinley
- Succeeded by: Benjamin H. Moss

Personal details
- Born: 1981 (age 44–45) Arkansas, U.S.
- Education: University of Virginia (BS); University of Iowa College of Law (JD)

Daniel E. Burrows is an American public servant who currently serves as Assistant Attorney General in the U.S. Department of Justice.

== Early life and education ==
Burrows was born in 1981 in Arkansas. He attended the University of Virginia and received his JD from the University of Iowa College of Law.

== Career ==
Burrows is a member of the Federalist Society and has been a featured speaker for many conservative organizations and think tanks.

From January 2023 to January 2025, Burrows served as Chief Deputy Attorney General under Kris Kobach in Kansas.

At the beginning of President Donald Trump's second term in January 2025, Burrows joined the White House staff as deputy staff secretary.

In November 2025, President Trump nominated Burrows to be an Assistant Attorney General; because the Senate did not act on the nomination that year, he was re-nominated in 2026. The Senate confirmed Burrows' nomination in February 2026 on a party-line vote. According to the Department of Justice, Burrows is "responsible for planning, developing, and coordinating the Department of Justice’s major policy initiatives."
