= White and Williams =

US law firm

White and Williams LLP
- Headquarters: Philadelphia, Pennsylvania
- No. of offices: 10
- No. of attorneys: 225
- Major practice areas: General Practice
- Key people: Andrew Susko; (Managing Partner and Chair of the Executive Committee)
- Date founded: 1899
- Founder: Thomas Raeburn White
- Company type: Limited Liability Partnership
- Website: WhiteandWilliams.com

White and Williams LLP is a law firm, headquartered in Philadelphia, Pennsylvania, founded in 1899 by Thomas Raeburn White. White and Williams currently has approximately 225 lawyers and serves clients from ten offices located throughout Pennsylvania, Connecticut, Maryland, Rhode Island, Delaware, New York, New Jersey and Massachusetts.

White and Williams has been nationally ranked as a Tier 1 Best Law Firm by U.S. News & World Report in insurance law and nationally ranked as a Tier 2 Best Law Firm in bankruptcy and creditor debtor rights / insolvency and reorganization law.

In the 1950s, White and Williams assisted in enforcing the desegregation of public schools in the south when W. Wilson White, son of Thomas Raeburn White, was called upon by U.S. President Dwight D. Eisenhower to author legal opinions supporting the use of federal troops in Little Rock, Arkansas. In 1961, the firm became one of the first Philadelphia headquartered law firms to elect a woman, Virginia "Ginny" Barton Wallace, to the partnership.

== Practice areas ==
White and Williams' lawyers cover a number of areas including business, insurance, healthcare, subrogation, labor & employment, financial restructuring and bankruptcy, real estate and finance and higher education.

== Pro Bono Activities and School Adoption Program ==
White and Williams has "adopted" several public schools. From 2012 to 2014, White and Williams "adopted" three public schools in the School District of Philadelphia. Each school has received a donation as well as other gifts. Gifts have included scholarships, school supplies, and winter clothing. In 2014, White and Williams donated $10,000 to Chester A. Arthur School, a K-8 public school, toward the purchase of Chromebooks for the school's middle school students.

== China Business Practice ==
=== Strategic Alliance ===
White and Williams has a "strategic alliance" with the Xue Law Firm in Shanghai (formed in 2007) and the Winners Law Firm in Tianjin (formed in 2012), in order to better serve U.S. companies doing business in China as well as Chinese companies looking to do business in the U.S.

=== World Trade Center Member Company of the Year ===
The World Trade Center of Greater Philadelphia (WTCGP) selected White and Williams as 2012 Member Company of the Year for Pennsylvania. The firm was honored during WTCGP's 10th anniversary celebration and dinner on May 17, 2012, at the Bellevue Hotel in Philadelphia, Pennsylvania.

=== Trade mission to China ===
In November 2012, Gary Biehn, Chair of the China Business Group, was part of a Philadelphia delegation, led by Mayor Michael Nutter, traveling to Philadelphia's Sister City of Tianjin, China. The goal of the trip was to raise Philadelphia's international profile, drum up business opportunities, and renew discussions about direct flights between the Philadelphia and China.

== Coverage College ==
Since 2007, White and Williams LLP has held an annual conference on insurance coverage issues called Coverage College. The "College" provides an opportunity for insurance claims professionals to engage in a study of an insurance coverage curriculum. White and Williams' lawyers serve as the faculty and lecture on a variety of insurance coverage issues. Currently, White and Williams Chair Emeritus/Former Managing Partner, Patricia Santelle serves as Dean of the college. Former Partner Gail White helped to found the annual event.

== Notable Lawyers and Alumni ==
- Warren Kampf, member of the Pennsylvania House of Representatives
- John W. Lord, Jr., Pennsylvania State Senator for the 6th district from 1948 to 1951, Philadelphia City councilman, United States District Judge
- Hugh Scott, United States Senator
- Thomas Raeburn White, founder
- W. Wilson White, Assistant Attorney General for the United States Department of Justice Civil Rights Division (1957–1960)

== Sources used ==
- Philadelphia Business Journal Book of Lists. Philadelphia: Philadelphia Business Journal.
