= Virginia A. Seitz =

American lawyer

Virginia Seitz

United States Assistant Attorney General for the Office of Legal Counsel
- In office September 30, 2011 – December 20, 2013
- President: Barack Obama
- Preceded by: Caroline D. Krass (Acting)
- Succeeded by: Karl R. Thompson (Acting)

Personal details
- Born: August 1, 1956 (age 69) Wilmington, Delaware, U.S.
- Party: Democratic
- Spouse: Roy W. McLeese III
- Parent: Collins J. Seitz (father)
- Relatives: Collins J. Seitz Jr. (brother); John F. R. Seitz (uncle)
- Education: Duke University (BA); Brasenose College, Oxford (BA); University at Buffalo (JD)

Virginia Anne Seitz (born August 1, 1956) is an American attorney who specializes in constitutional law, labor law, employment law and administrative law. She served as the United States Assistant Attorney General for the Office of Legal Counsel in the United States Department of Justice from 2011 until stepping down in December 2013. Seitz was confirmed to the post by the Senate in a voice vote on June 28, 2011.

== Early life and education ==
Seitz was born in Wilmington, Delaware, on August 1, 1956. Her father, Collins J. Seitz, was a chancellor of Delaware who wrote the 1952 decision in Gebhart v. Belton, which paved the way for Brown v. Board of Education.

Seitz earned a bachelor's degree in 1978 from Duke University, and was a Rhodes Scholar. She earned an BA in 1980 from Brasenose College, Oxford (promoted to an MA per tradition). She earned a J.D. degree in 1985 from the University at Buffalo Law School.

After law school, Seitz clerked from 1985 until 1986 for Judge Harry T. Edwards of the United States Court of Appeals for the District of Columbia Circuit, and from 1986 until 1987 for Justice William J. Brennan of the Supreme Court of the United States.

== Career ==
After clerking for the Supreme Court, Seitz worked for the labor law firm of Bredhoff & Kaiser in Washington, DC. In 1998, she joined Sidley Austin as a partner in the firm's Washington office. In November 2008, Legal Times reported that Seitz's name was being discussed as a possible nominee to the Supreme Court of the United States by Barack Obama.

In November 2011, Seitz was included on The New Republic's list of Washington's most powerful, least famous people.

After leaving the Office of Legal Counsel in 2013, Seitz returned to Sidley Austin. She was elected to the American Law Institute in 2017.

=== Assistant Attorney General for the Office of Legal Counsel ===
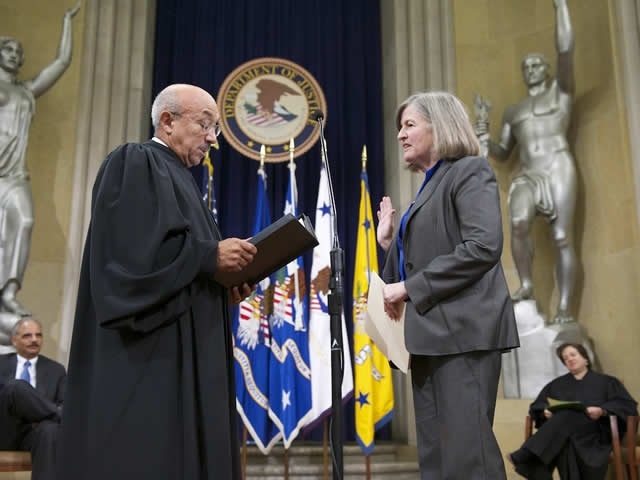
Judge Harry Edwards swears in Seitz as Assistant Attorney General on September 30, 2011

On August 4, 2010, National Public Radio reported that Seitz was the leading candidate to serve as the Assistant Attorney General for the Office of Legal Counsel in the United States Department of Justice. President Obama had not appointed a Senate-confirmed nominee to head the OLC, and his previous nominee for the job, Dawn Johnsen, withdrew her candidacy after it languished for more than a year in the face of opposition from Senate Republicans.

On January 5, 2011, Obama nominated Seitz to be Assistant Attorney General for OLC.

The full United States Senate confirmed Seitz in a voice vote on June 28, 2011.

During Seitz's tenure, she wrote an opinion that stated that the U.S. Senate's periodic pro forma sessions did not interrupt a Senate recess and thus did not prevent the president from making recess appointments. The U.S. Supreme Court rejected this position in National Labor Relations Board v. Noel Canning on June 26, 2014 with the majority opinion by Justice Stephen Breyer stating "the Senate is in session when it says it is." However, the decision allowed the use of recess appointments during breaks within a session for vacancies that existed prior to the break, which also had been a matter of contention. The prior United States Court of Appeals for the District of Columbia Circuit opinion in the same case had held that recess appointments were limited to only those vacancies that "happen" to occur during the inter-session break, not to vacancies that existed prior to the recess.

Seitz resigned as Assistant Attorney General, effective December 20, 2013.

== Personal ==
Seitz's husband, Roy W. McLeese III, is a judge on the District of Columbia Court of Appeals. McLeese served as Assistant to the Solicitor General from 1997 to 1999. He rejoined the Office of the Solicitor General as Acting Deputy Solicitor General to cover the position that longtime deputy Michael Dreeben vacated while on leave to teach. Seitz's brother is Collins J. Seitz Jr., the Chief Justice of the Delaware Supreme Court.

== See also ==
- List of law clerks for the third seat of the Supreme Court of the United States
- Barack Obama Supreme Court candidates
