= John Harmon (attorney) =

American lawyer

John M. Harmon

United States Assistant Attorney General for the Office of Legal Counsel
- In office May 5, 1977 – 1981
- President: Jimmy Carter
- Preceded by: Antonin Scalia
- Succeeded by: Theodore Olson

Personal details
- Born: July 16, 1944 (age 81) Statesville, North Carolina, U.S.
- Education: University of North Carolina (BA); Duke University (JD)
- Profession: Lawyer

John M. Harmon (born July 16, 1944) is an American lawyer who served as United States Assistant Attorney General for the Office of Legal Counsel during the Jimmy Carter administration.

== Biography ==
Harmon was born in Statesville, North Carolina. From 1962 to 1966, he attended the University of North Carolina receiving his Bachelor of Arts and his Juris Doctor from Duke University School of Law in 1969.

Until 1970 he worked as a law clerk for Judge Griffin Bell in the United States Court of Appeals for the Fifth Circuit and Eleventh Circuit. From 1970 to 1971 he was a law clerk in the office of Associate Justice Hugo Black in the United States Supreme Court, after that until 1972 in the office of Chief Justice Warren E. Burger. For the next four years Harmon practiced law with Coudert Frères and served as U.S. Representative to Court of Arbitration of International Chamber of Commerce in Paris, France.

In 1977 he was assigned United States Assistant Attorney General by Jimmy Carter. He worked in the Office of Legal Counsel until 1981. Afterwards Harmon entered the law firm Graves, Dougherty, Hearon, Moody & Garwood in Austin, Texas where he practices Business Litigation and international Litigation.

== Awards ==
Harmon is listed in Best Lawyers in America 2001–2010.
Since 1986 he is Honorary French Counsul.

== See also ==
- List of law clerks for the chief justice of the United States
- List of law clerks for the first seat of the Supreme Court of the United States
