= T. Elliot Gaiser =

American attorney (born 1989)

Elliot Gaiser
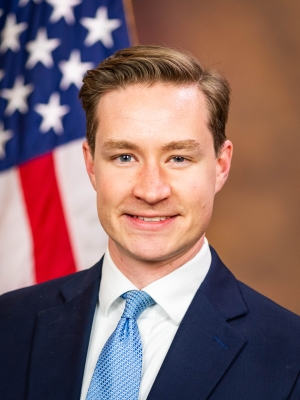
- Official portrait, 2025

United States Assistant Attorney General for the Office of Legal Counsel
- Incumbent
- Assumed office August 4, 2025
- President: Donald Trump
- Preceded by: Christopher Fonzone

Solicitor General of Ohio
- In office November 20, 2023 – August 3, 2025
- Governor: Mike DeWine
- Preceded by: Benjamin Flowers
- Succeeded by: Mathura Sridharan

Personal details
- Born: Thomas Elliot Gaiser; September 6, 1989 (age 37) Cleveland, Ohio, U.S.
- Party: Republican
- Education: Hillsdale College (BA); University of Chicago (JD)

Thomas Elliot Gaiser (born September 6, 1989) is an American attorney who has served as the United States assistant attorney general for the Office of Legal Counsel since 2025.

After graduating from the University of Chicago Law School, Gaiser clerked for appellate judges Edith H. Jones, Neomi Rao, and then Justice Samuel Alito. He was involved in efforts to overturn the 2020 presidential election. In October 2023, Dave Yost, the Attorney General of Ohio, named Gaiser as the state's solicitor general.

In April 2025, president Donald Trump named Gaiser as his nominee for assistant attorney general for the Office of Legal Counsel. He was confirmed by the Senate in July and took office the following month.

== Early life and education (1989–2016) ==
Thomas Elliot Gaiser was born on September 6, 1989, in Cleveland, Ohio. In high school, he participated in speech and debate. Gaiser graduated from Hillsdale College in 2012 with a degree in political economy and speech studies. At Hillsdale, he was a conservative podcaster and was involved in the students' union. Gaiser was a four-time finalist of the Edward Everett Oratory Contest. He interned for The Heritage Foundation and Liberty Central, a political advocacy group founded by Ginni Thomas, the wife of Supreme Court associate justice Clarence Thomas, and wrote for The Daily Caller, RealClearPolicy, The Orange County Register, The Daily Signal, The American Spectator, PJ Media, and The Federalist. He was in Hillsdale's journalism program and served as the opinions editor of The Collegian his senior year. In addition, Gaiser was the president of Hillsdale's chapter of Students for Free Enterprise.

After graduating from Hillsdale College, Gaiser worked for Altus Technologies Corporation for five months. He later attended the Ohio State University Moritz College of Law, transferring into the University of Chicago Law School after a year. In law school, he worked for Cleary Gottlieb Steen & Hamilton, later handling appellate cases for the office of the Ohio solicitor general, including before the Ohio Supreme Court. Before graduating, Gaiser externed for judge Alice M. Batchelder of the Court of Appeals for the Sixth Circuit. He graduated from the University of Chicago in 2016.

== Career ==
=== Clerkships and legal work (2016–2022) ===
After graduating from the University of Chicago, Gaiser clerked for judge Edith H. Jones of the Court of Appeals for the Fifth Circuit for the 2016–2017 term. By November 2017, he had begun working at Gibson Dunn. Gaiser was later a clerk for judge Neomi Rao of the Court of Appeals for the District of Columbia Circuit. By December 2020, he had worked at Boyden Gray & Associates. In July 2021, Gaiser began serving as a clerk to Supreme Court associate justice Samuel Alito for the 2021–2022 term. In September 2022, Gaiser returned to Hillsdale College to co-teach a one week, one-credit course on constitutional interpretation. Jones Day named Gaiser as an associate in December 2022.

=== Efforts to overturn the 2020 presidential election (2020–2021) ===
In 2020, Gaiser worked as legal counsel for Donald Trump's 2020 presidential campaign. White House press secretary Kayleigh McEnany testified before the House Select Committee on the January 6 Attack that she considered him an expert on constitutional law. Gaiser worked on election litigation after the 2020 presidential election and produced a speech that rejected the results of the election. According to McEnany, the speech appeared similar to one Trump later delivered, and Gaiser "mentioned in passing" the theory that vice president Mike Pence could refuse to recognize electors from certain states.

=== Solicitor general of Ohio (2023–2025) ===
On October 18, 2023, Dave Yost, the attorney general of Ohio, named Gaiser as the state's solicitor general. He was sworn into office in November. In February 2025, Gaiser argued on behalf of the Ohio Department of Youth Services in Ames v. Ohio Department of Youth Services, a Supreme Court. The Court ruled against the Ohio Department of Youth Services in June.

=== Assistant Attorney General for the Office of Legal Counsel (2025–present) ===
On April 1, 2025, The New York Times reported that president Donald Trump intended to nominate Gaiser as the United States assistant attorney general for the Office of Legal Counsel. Trump officially announced his nomination the following day. Gaiser appeared before the Senate Committee on the Judiciary on May 21. In his testimony before the committee, Gaiser did not directly answer whether Trump won the 2020 presidential election and avoided questions as to whether he would advise Trump to ignore orders issued by federal courts. The Senate Judiciary Committee voted to advance Gaiser's nomination 12–10 along party lines on June 12. He was confirmed by the Senate in a 53–45 vote along party lines on July 30.

In September, Gaiser signed a memorandum arguing that the U.S.'s maritime strikes on alleged drug traffickers in the Caribbean were lawful, comparing alleged drug traffickers to foreign nations attempting to invade the United States. In November, he told congressional lawmakers that the U.S. strikes on Latin American cartels was not subject to the War Powers Resolution and did not require congressional approval, an interpretation disputed by some legal experts as a violation of U.S. and international law. That month, he authored a memorandum arguing that it was legal to detail military lawyers as immigration judges. The memorandum was criticized by some legal scholars as an unprecedented expansion of executive authority.

In December 2025, Gaiser drafted a memo declaring it lawful for the Trump administration to order a military operation to seize Venezuelan president Nicolás Maduro. The following month, he issued an opinion declaring that a federal statute prohibiting the mailing of concealable firearms was unconstitutional. In April 2026, Gaiser authored an opinion declaring that the Presidential Records Act unconstitutionally infringed on the president's executive authority and that Trump did not need to provide presidential records to the National Archives and Records Administration, claiming that the act was "untethered from any valid and identifiable legislative purpose". In May, he supported a proposal by the Department of Justice to use Keepseagle v. Vilsack (2016), a class-action lawsuit settlement, to establish the Anti-Weaponization Fund, a program to compensate victims of supposed prosecutorial overreach.

=== U.S. federal judge nomination ===
On November 9, 2026, President Trump announced that he would nominate Gaiser to be a judge on the United States District Court for the Northern District of Texas. Senator John Cornyn from Texas announced his refusal to return Gaiser's blue slip, stating that “He’s not from Texas. He hasn’t been vetted. And this is a lifetime job, and there’s better qualified people to hold that job." Cornyn also called him a "bright man" who had been used as a "pawn in this process."
