= Jolene Ann Lauria =

American civil servant

Jolene Lauria
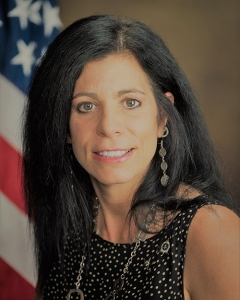

United States Assistant Attorney General for Administration
- Incumbent
- Assumed office June 4, 2022; Acting: June 4, 2022 – December 21, 2023
- President: Joe Biden; Donald Trump
- Preceded by: Lee J. Lofthus

Personal details
- Education: American University

Jolene Ann Lauria Sullens is an American civil servant currently serving as the United States Assistant Attorney General for Administration on a permanent basis since December 21, 2023 after having served in that position in an acting capacity since June 4, 2022.

== Career ==
Prior to serving as in her current role as United States Assistant Attorney General for Administration, she had served as Deputy Assistant Attorney General for Administration and Controller since 2007. Prior to serving as Deputy Assistant Attorney General for Administration and Controller, she was the U.S. Justice Department's Director of Budget Staff, and she was the Deputy Chief Financial Officer/Director of Budget at the National Oceanic and Atmospheric Administration (NOAA). She has held a variety of positions in budget and financial management during her 33 years in the Federal government. From 2015 to 2018, she served on INTERPOL's executive committee as the representative for the Americas Region.

She is currently the Chair of INTERPOL's Advisory Group on Financial Matters that reviews and makes recommendations on INTERPOL's worldwide budget.

She received a master's degree in Public Administration from American University in 1989. In 2013, she graduated from the Federal Bureau of Investigation National Academy, Class 252. She was the recipient of a Meritorious Presidential Rank Award in 2006, and she received a Distinguished Presidential Rank Award in 2010.

Legal offices
Preceded by Lee J. Lofthus	United States Assistant Attorney General for Administration; 2022–present (Acting: 2022–2023)	Incumbent
