= W. Wilson White =

American judge (1906–1964)

United States Assistant Attorney General for the Civil Rights Division
- In office 1957–1960
- Appointed by: Dwight Eisenhower
- Preceded by: Position established
- Succeeded by: Harold R. Tyler Jr.

United States Attorney for the Eastern District of Pennsylvania
- In office 1953–1957
- President: Dwight Eisenhower
- Preceded by: Gerald A. Gleeson
- Succeeded by: Harold Kenneth Wood

Personal details
- Born: February 23, 1906 Philadelphia County, Pennsylvania
- Died: November 11, 1964 (aged 58) Philadelphia County, Pennsylvania
- Resting place: West Laurel Hill Cemetery
- Party: Republican
- Spouse: Mary Lowbar Knight (m. 1932)
- Children: 3
- Parent: Thomas Raeburn White

William Wilson White Sr. (February 23, 1906 – November 11, 1964) was a prominent attorney in Philadelphia, Pennsylvania and served as the first United States Assistant Attorney General for the Department of Justice Civil Rights Division from 1957 to 1960. He was the United States Attorney for the Eastern District of Pennsylvania from 1953 to 1957. White was also a partner in the law firm White and Williams LLP which was founded by his father, Thomas Raeburn White.

He graduated from Harvard College and University of Pennsylvania Law School.

Legal offices
Preceded by Position established	United States Assistant Attorney General for the Civil Rights Division; 1957–1960	Succeeded by Harold R. Tyler Jr.
