= Richard K. Willard =

American attorney

25th United States Assistant Attorney General for the Civil Division
- In office 1983–1988
- President: Ronald Reagan
- Preceded by: J. Paul McGrath
- Succeeded by: John R. Bolton

Personal details
- Born: September 1, 1948 (age 77) Houston, Texas, U.S.
- Party: Republican
- Education: Emory University (BA); Harvard University (JD)

Richard K. Willard (born September 1, 1948) is an American attorney who served as the United States Assistant Attorney General for the Civil Division from 1983 to 1988.

== See also ==
- List of law clerks for the second seat of the Supreme Court of the United States
