= J. Paul McGrath =

American lawyer (1940–2013)

United States Assistant Attorney General for the Antitrust Division
- In office December 16, 1983 – April 1, 1985
- President: Ronald Reagan
- Preceded by: William Baxter
- Succeeded by: Douglas H. Ginsburg

United States Assistant Attorney General for the Civil Division
- In office 1981 – December 16, 1983
- President: Ronald Reagan
- Preceded by: Alice Daniel
- Succeeded by: Richard K. Willard

Personal details
- Born: September 9, 1940 Rochester, New York, U.S.
- Died: July 9, 2013 (aged 72) Montclair, New Jersey, U.S.
- Party: Republican
- Education: College of the Holy Cross (BA); Harvard University (LLB)

John Paul McGrath (September 9, 1940 – July 9, 2013) was an American lawyer who served as the United States Assistant Attorney General for the Civil Division from 1981 to 1983 and as the United States Assistant Attorney General for the Antitrust Division from 1983 to 1985.

== Early life and education ==
McGrath was born on September 9, 1940, in Rochester, New York. His father was Thomas E. McGrath, a vice president at the Eastman Kodak Company.

McGrath graduated from McQuaid Jesuit High School in 1958 as the school's first valedictorian. Afterwards, he attended the College of the Holy Cross in Worcester, Massachusetts, where he graduated with a Bachelor of Arts, cum laude, in history in 1962. He then earned his Bachelor of Laws (LL.B.), cum laude, in 1965 from Harvard Law School, where he was an editor of the Harvard Law Review.

== Career ==
After graduating from law school, McGrath entered private practice at the law firm of Dewey Ballantine, where he spent the entirety of his private career. He was the managing general partner and chairman of the firm's litigation department until 1992. Most of his practice concerned antitrust litigation and counseling.

President Ronald Reagan nominated McGrath to be an assistant attorney general of the United States in 1981. He first served as an assistant attorney general for the Civil Division of the U.S. Justice Department, then became the assistant attorney general for the Antitrust Division on December 16, 1983, succeeding William Baxter. During his time under the Antitrust Division, McGrath attempted to make joint ventures as suitable alternatives to corporate mergers. He also continued the policies established by Baxter regarding mergers and issued guidelines for companies.

After serving for about five years in the Justice Department as the primary antitrust lawyer under the Reagan administration, McGrath announced on December 18, 1984, that he intended to leave and return to private practice. Reagan selected Douglas H. Ginsburg as his successor. After leaving government service, McGrath became the senior vice president, general counsel, and company secretary of American Standard Companies until retiring in 2004.

== Personal life and death ==
McGrath died on July 9, 2013, in Montclair, New Jersey, at age 72. He married his wife, Eileen Patricia Robinson, in 1964. They had four children: John, David, Trish, and Robyn.
