= United States Department of Justice Justice Management Division =

- Seal of the United States Department of Justice

Division overview
- Formed: 1979
- Preceding Division: Office of Management and Finance
- Jurisdiction: United States federal government agency
- Headquarters: Robert F. Kennedy Department of Justice Building; 950 Pennsylvania Avenue NW; Washington, D.C., United States
- Division executive: Jolene Ann Lauria, Assistant Attorney General for Administration
- Parent department: United States Department of Justice
- Website: justice.gov/jmd

The Justice Management Division (JMD) is a division of the United States Department of Justice (DOJ). It is the administrative arm of the Department of Justice. Its mission is to support some 40 senior management offices (SMOs), offices, bureaus, and divisions (collectively called components) of the DOJ. It was formerly called the Office of Management and Finance.

== Organizational chart ==
- Justice Management Division: Assistant Attorney General for Administration (AAG-A) (currently Jolene Ann Lauria), since June 2022 (in an acting capacity until December 2023); succeeding Lee J. Lofthus. The AAG-A reports to the deputy attorney general (DAG).
  - Deputy Assistant Attorney General/Chief Information Officer(DAAG/CIO) is Currently Shantrell (Nikki) Collier
    - Service Delivery Staff
    - Cybersecurity Services Staff
    - Policy and Planning Staff
  - Deputy Assistant Attorney General/Controller
    - Budget Staff
    - Finance Staff
    - Strategic Planning and Performance Staff
    - Debt Collection Management Staff
    - Asset Forfeiture Management Staff
  - Deputy Assistant Attorney General for Human Resources and Administration (DAAG/HRA)
    - Human Resources Staff
    - Equal Employment Opportunity Staff
    - Security and Emergency Planning Staff
    - Library Staff
    - Consolidated Executive Office
    - Departmental Executive Secretariat
  - Deputy Assistant Attorney General for Policy, Management and Procurement
    - Internal Review and Evaluation Office
    - Office of General Counsel
    - Facilities and Administrative Services Staff
    - Departmental Ethics Office
    - Procurement Services Staff
    - Office of Records Management Policy
    - Office of Acquisition Management
