= Christopher H. Schroeder =

American lawyer and professor (born 1948)

Christopher Schroeder
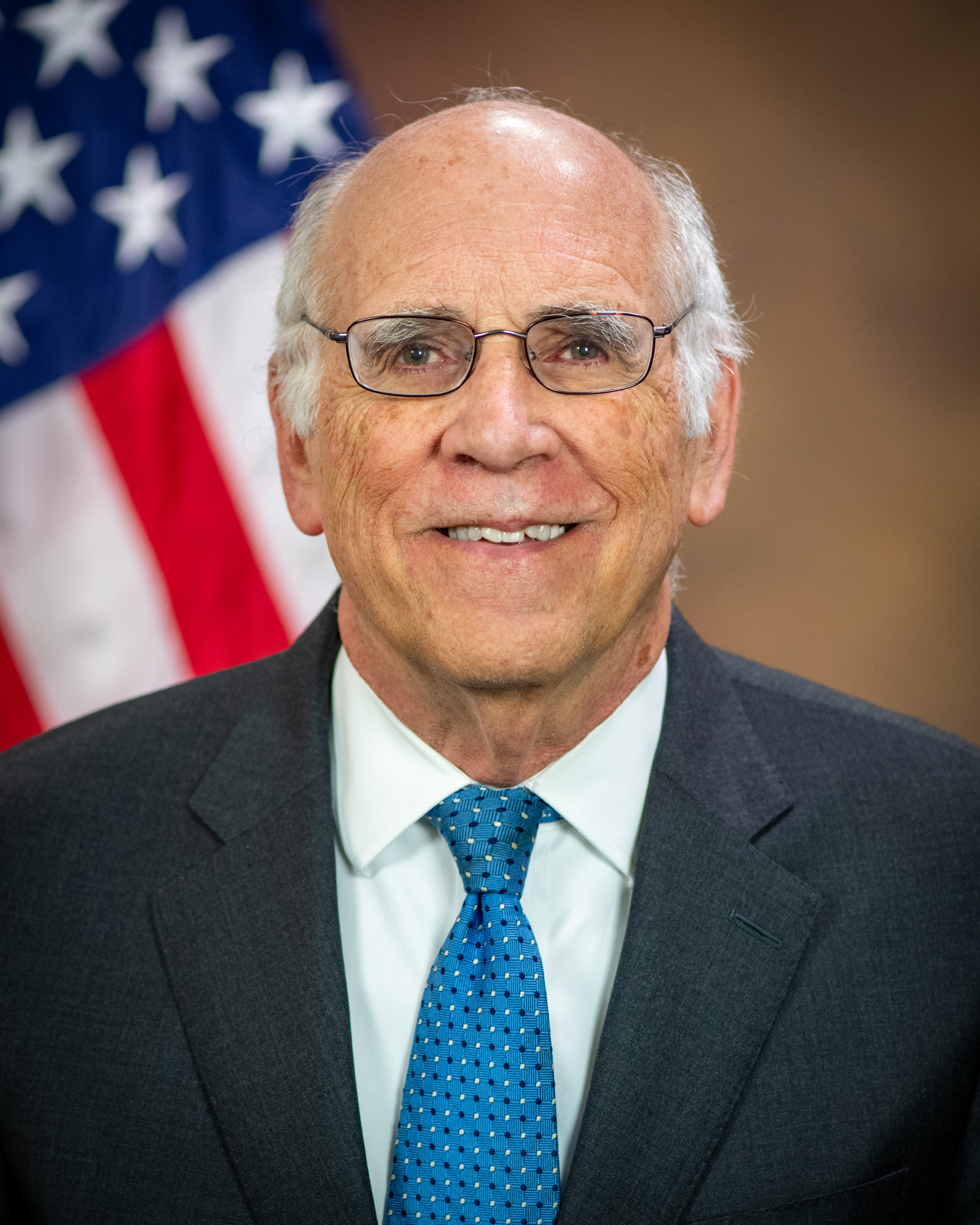
- Schroeder in 2021

United States Assistant Attorney General for the Office of Legal Counsel
- In office October 29, 2021 – July 9, 2023
- President: Joe Biden
- Preceded by: Steven Engel
- Succeeded by: Christopher Fonzone

United States Assistant Attorney General for the Office of Legal Policy
- In office April 21, 2010 – December 2012
- President: Barack Obama
- Preceded by: Kevin R. Jones (acting)
- Succeeded by: Beth Ann Williams

Personal details
- Born: Christopher Henry Schroeder; 1948 (age 77–78) Springfield, Ohio, U.S.
- Party: Democratic
- Spouse: Katharine Bartlett
- Children: 3
- Education: Princeton University (BA); Yale University (MDiv); University of California, Berkeley (JD)

Christopher Henry Schroeder (born 1948) is an American lawyer who served as Assistant Attorney General for the Office of Legal Counsel in the Biden Administration from 2021 to 2023. He served as the Assistant Attorney General for the Office of Legal Policy in the United States Department of Justice during the presidency of Barack Obama, serving from April 2010 until December 2012. Before and after his time as Assistant Attorney General, he was the Charles S. Murphy Professor of Law and Professor of Public Policy Studies at Duke University School of Law. He is now Professor Emeritus of the same institution.

== Early life and education ==
Born in Springfield, Ohio, Schroeder earned a bachelor's degree from Princeton University in June 1968, a master of divinity degree from Yale Divinity School in 1971 and a J.D. degree from University of California, Berkeley, School of Law, in 1974. While at law school, Schroeder was the editor-in-chief of the California Law Review.

== Professional career ==
Schroeder began his legal career in 1974 as an associate in the San Francisco office of the law firm McCutchen, Doyle, Brown and Enersen (later Bingham McCutchen LLP). In June 1976, Schroeder left McCutchen to take a job for one year as a research associate at the Earl Warren Legal Institute (now the Institute for Legal Research) at the University of California Berkeley.

From July 1977 until March 1979, Schroeder worked as a partner at the law firm of Armour, Schroeder, St. John Wilcox and Goodlin, which was a small firm that he had started with four colleagues.

In July 1979, Schroeder became an associate professor of law at Duke University School of Law. He became a full professor of law in 1985, and later added the additional title of Professor of Public Policy Studies. In addition, Schroeder added the responsibilities of Director of the Program in Public Law at Duke's law school in 2000.

Schroeder also served as a consultant for the law firm of O'Melveny & Myers from 2002 until 2005, and he was of counsel for the firm from 2005 until 2009.

== Government service ==
From July 1987 until January 1988, from February 1988 until June 1990, and from July 1991 until October 1991, Schroeder worked as a Special Nominations Counsel for the United States Senate Committee on the Judiciary. He served as Chief Counsel to the committee from July 1992 until February 1993.

From April 1993 until January 1994, Schroeder took a leave of absence from Duke Law to serve as Counselor to the Assistant Attorney General, in the Office of Legal Counsel. From April 1995 until January 1997, Schroeder again took a leave of absence from Duke to serve as Deputy Assistant Attorney General in the United States Department of Justice.

From December 1998 until March 1999, Schroeder served as Impeachment Trial Counsel for then-Sen. Joe Biden.

In May 2009, President Barack Obama selected Schroeder, who had served on Obama's transition team, to be the Assistant Attorney General for the Office of Legal Policy in the Department of Justice. The White House originally had planned to tap Mark Gitenstein for the post but reportedly reconsidered after opposition to his potential nomination because of his lobbying background.

On July 28, 2009, Schroeder was reported out of the United States Senate Committee on the Judiciary in a voice vote.

Despite a false report that he was confirmed by the United States Senate on August 7, 2009, Schroeder was not confirmed with a large number of nominees who were confirmed that day.

Senate Majority Leader Harry Reid filed for cloture on Schroeder's nomination on April 15, 2010. The Senate confirmed Schroeder on April 21, 2010, in a 72–24 vote.

As assistant attorney general, Schroeder served as chief policy adviser to Attorney General Eric Holder and Deputy Attorney General David W. Ogden.

At the end of 2012, Schroeder resigned as assistant attorney general and returned to Duke Law School.

In November 2020, Schroeder was named a volunteer member of the Joe Biden presidential transition Agency Review Team to support transition efforts related to the United States Department of Justice.

== Writings ==
In 2009, Schroeder co-authored the book Keeping Faith with the Constitution, along with Pamela S. Karlan and Goodwin Liu. He also has authored a leading environmental law casebook, Environmental Regulation: Law, Science and Policy.

== Personal life and family ==
Schroeder is married to Katharine T. Bartlett, also a professor of law. They have three adult children: Emily, Theodore, and Elizabeth.

Legal offices
Preceded by Kevin R. Jones (acting)	United States Assistant Attorney General for the Office of Legal Policy; April 21, 2010–December 2012	Succeeded by Elana Tyrangiel (acting)
