= Christopher Fonzone =

American lawyer (born 1975)

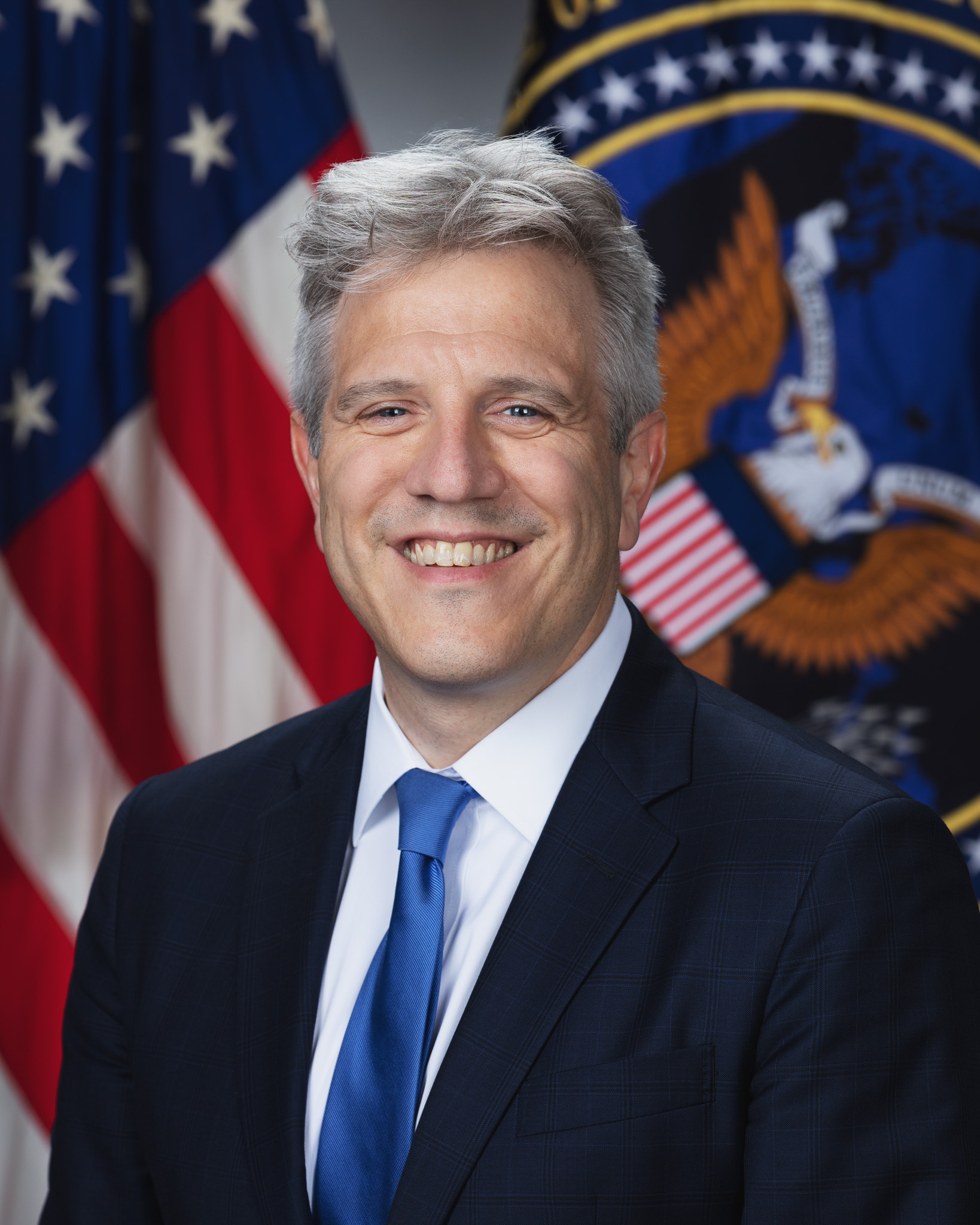

United States Assistant Attorney General for the Office of Legal Counsel
- In office January 5, 2024 – January 20, 2025
- President: Joe Biden
- Preceded by: Christopher H. Schroeder
- Succeeded by: T. Elliot Gaiser

General Counsel to the Office of the Director of National Intelligence
- In office June 24, 2021 – January 5, 2024
- President: Joe Biden
- Preceded by: Jason Klitenic

Personal details
- Born: October 16, 1975 (age 50) Allentown, Pennsylvania, U.S.
- Education: Cornell University (BA); Harvard University (JD)

Christopher Charles Fonzone (born October 16, 1975) is an American attorney who had served as the United States assistant attorney general for the Office of Legal Counsel. He previously served as the general counsel to the Office of the Director of National Intelligence.

== Early life and education ==
Fonzone was born on October 16, 1975 in Allentown, Pennsylvania. He earned a Bachelor of Arts degree in English and economics from Cornell University in 1998 and a Juris Doctor from Harvard Law School in 2007.

== Career ==
From 2000 to 2004, Fonzone worked as a principal and engagement manager at Novantas, a financial services firm. In 2006 and 2007, he served as a law clerk for Judge J. Harvie Wilkinson III. In 2008 and 2009, he served as an appellate attorney in the United States Department of Justice Civil Division. In 2009 and 2010, he served as a law clerk for Supreme Court Justice Stephen Breyer. From 2010 to 2012, he served as special counsel in the United States Department of Defense. In 2012, he also briefly served as an advisor in the Office of Legal Counsel. From 2013 to 2017, he served as deputy assistant and counsel to President Barack Obama, in addition to legal advisor to the United States National Security Council. In 2017, Fonzone became a partner at Sidley Austin.

In 2021, Fonzone was nominated to serve as general counsel to the Office of the Director of National Intelligence. During his confirmation process, he was criticized for his lobbying work on behalf of Huawei and China's Ministry of Commerce during his time at Sidley Austin. Fonzone was confirmed by a vote of 55–45. On September 5, 2023, President Joe Biden announced his intent to nominate Fonzone to serve as the United States assistant attorney general for the Office of Legal Counsel. On September 7, 2023, his nomination was sent to the Senate. On November 1, 2023, a hearing on his nomination was held before the Senate Judiciary Committee. On November 30, 2023, his nomination was reported out of the Senate Judiciary Committee by an 11–10 party-line vote. On December 19, 2023, his nomination was confirmed by the Senate in a 50–17 vote. He was sworn on January 5, 2024 by Attorney General Merrick Garland.
