= Timothy Flanigan =

American lawyer and politician

Personal details
- Born: Timothy Elliott Flanigan; May 16, 1953 (age 73) Fort Belvoir, Virginia, U.S.
- Spouse: Katie
- Children: 14
- Education: Brigham Young University (BA); University of Virginia (JD, MBA)
- Profession: Politician, lawyer

Timothy Elliott Flanigan (born May 16, 1953 in Fort Belvoir, Virginia) is an American lawyer and politician. On May 24, 2005, President George W. Bush nominated him as U.S. deputy attorney general, the second highest position in the Department of Justice. On October 7, 2005, his name was withdrawn from consideration. He was replaced by Paul McNulty.

== Biography ==
In 1976, Flanigan obtained his bachelor's degree from Brigham Young University, where he met his wife Katie. In 1981, he received his Juris Doctor from the University of Virginia, where he later also obtained a Master of Business Administration degree. He is a member of the Church of Jesus Christ of Latter-day Saints and has 14 children. Flanigan was a clerk for Chief Justice Warren Burger from 1985 to 1986. He was also partner at White & Case, where he concentrated on white-collar criminal and civil litigation. During the administration of President George H. W. Bush, he was appointed at the Department of Justice as Assistant Attorney General for the Office of Legal Counsel, from 1990 to 1992.

After the 2000 United States presidential election, Flanigan served as a lawyer in the case of Bush v. Gore over the methods and procedures used in counting the Florida vote. During the administration of President George W. Bush, he served as Deputy White House counsel to Alberto Gonzales, until December 2002. In that role, Flanigan was a principal legal advisor for the President, the Attorney General, and the heads of the executive branch agencies.

In December 2002, Flanigan left his job as White House Deputy Counsel to work as General Counsel, Corporate and International Law, at Tyco International. He was then a partner at McGuireWoods where his practice focused on international transactions and government investigations. A member of the Federalist Society, he is currently Chief Legal and Compliance Officer and Corporate Secretary at Cancer Treatment Centers of America.

In 2015, on the one-year anniversary of the Senate Intelligence Committee report on CIA torture, Human Rights Watch called for the investigation of Flanigan "for conspiracy to torture as well as other crimes."

After his time with McGuireWoods Flanigan became the senior vice president and principal deputy general counsel at BlackBerry. Flanigan has more recently beginning in 2016 worked as chief legal counsel for Cancer Treatment Centers of America.

== See also ==
- List of law clerks for the chief justice of the United States
- Jack Abramoff Indian lobbying scandal
