= Office of Legal Policy =

Main strategic planning division of the US Department of Justice

United States Department of Justice Office of Legal Policy
- Seal of the United States Department of Justice

Office overview
- Formed: 1981; 45 years ago
- Jurisdiction: Federal government of the United States
- Headquarters: Robert F. Kennedy Department of Justice Building; 950 Pennsylvania Avenue NW; Washington, D.C., United States
- Office executive: Daniel E. Burrows, Assistant Attorney General
- Parent department: U.S. Department of Justice
- Website: Official website

The Office of Legal Policy (OLP) is a senior management office within the United States Department of Justice, which describes itself as the "focal point for the development and coordination of departmental policy." In addition to rendering legal advice to the United States attorney general and subordinate offices within the Justice Department, it serves as a nexus where major policy decisions within the department can be developed, coordinated, and implemented. The office is currently led by assistant attorney general Daniel E. Burrows.

== History ==
The Office of Legal Policy (OLP) was established by Attorney General William French Smith in 1981 as the principal department office to plan, develop, and coordinate the implementation of major policy initiatives of high priority to the department and to the administration, and to assist the president and the attorney general in the administration's judicial selection process for Article III judges. OLP devoted considerable efforts to the areas of criminal and civil justice reform, as had some of its predecessor policy offices (among them, the Office of Criminal Justice, the Office of Policy and Planning, and the Office for Improvements in the Administration of Justice). OLP also supervised the work of the Office of Information and Privacy (OIP) with respect to Freedom of Information and Privacy Act matters.

In 1989, the office was renamed the Office of Policy Development (OPD), and OIP was established as a separate department component. For a one-year period, OPD was organized as a component of the newly created Office of Policy and Communications, together with the Office of Public Affairs and the Office of Intergovernmental Affairs. In 1993, that structure was discontinued and OPD was established again as an independent component.

In May 2001, Attorney General John Ashcroft restored the name of the office as the Office of Legal Policy and confirmed its principal policy role within the department.

In December 2024, president-elect Donald Trump announced Aaron Reitz, chief of staff to Senator Ted Cruz, would lead the office.

In February 2026, the Senate confirmed Daniel E. Burrows as Assistant Attorney General to lead policy.
