= Benjamin C. Mizer =

Acting Associate Attorney General of the United States

Ben Mizer
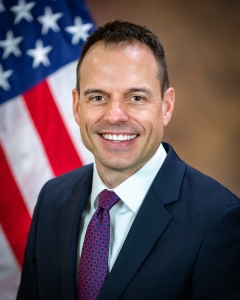

Acting United States Associate Attorney General
- In office February 2, 2024 – January 20, 2025
- President: Joe Biden
- Preceded by: Vanita Gupta
- Succeeded by: Stanley Woodward Jr.

Personal details
- Education: College of Wooster (BA); University of Michigan (JD)

Benjamin Charles Mizer is an American lawyer. He served as the Principal Deputy Associate Attorney General of the United States making him third in rank at the DOJ.
