= Roger J. Marzulla =

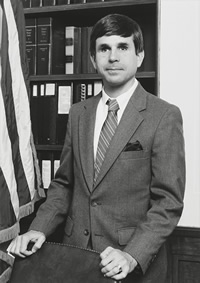

27th United States Assistant Attorney General for the Environment and Natural Resources
- In office 1988–1989
- President: Ronald Reagan
- Preceded by: F. Henry Habicht II
- Succeeded by: Richard B. Stewart

Personal details
- Born: August 12, 1947 (age 78); Glendale, California
- Political party: Republican

Roger J. Marzulla (born August 12, 1947) is an American attorney who served as the United States Assistant Attorney General for the Environment and Natural Resources in the Ronald Reagan administration from 1988 to 1989.

In 1997, he and his wife Nancie founded Marzulla Law, LLC in Washington, D.C., a law firm with close ties to the conservative legal movement. In 2025, the law firm was notable for representing groups that sought to block offshore wind projects.

He began his legal career as a trial lawyer in San Jose, California, after graduating magna cum laude from the University of Santa Clara School of Law. He worked for the Mountain States Legal Foundation, a conservative public interest law firm, of which he became head in 1981. He and his wife Nancie founded Defenders of Property Rights, which represented groups against environmental regulations. The Defenders of Property Rights is part of the Cooler Heads Coalition.
