= United States Department of Justice Environment and Natural Resources Division =

Government Department

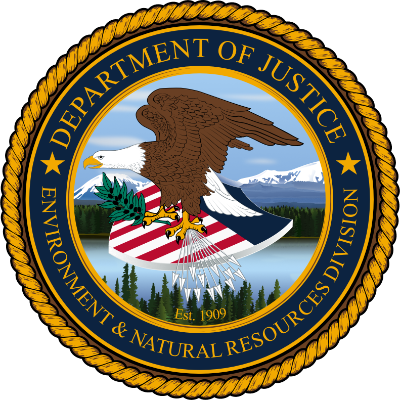
- Seal of the Environment and Natural Resources Division, United States Department of Justice

Agency overview
- Formed: 1909
- Jurisdiction: United States government agency
- Headquarters: Robert F. Kennedy Department of Justice Building 950 Pennsylvania Avenue NW Washington, D.C., United States
- Agency executives: Adam F. Gustafson, Acting Assistant Attorney General; Adam F. Gustafson, Principal Deputy Assistant Attorney General
- Parent department: U.S. Department of Justice
- Website: justice.gov/enrd

The United States Department of Justice Environment and Natural Resources Division (ENRD) is one of seven litigating components of the U.S. Department of Justice. ENRD's mandate is to enforce civil and criminal environmental laws and programs protecting the health and environment of the United States, and to defend suits challenging those laws and programs. In 2026, the division was renamed to the Energy and Natural Resources Division.

== History ==
The richness and complexity of the Division's history is inseparable from the larger story of the growth and changes of American society in the 20th century. In the early 1900s, Americans struggled to balance competing interests stemming from westward expansion, preservation of natural spaces, resource disputes on public and Tribal lands, and other related issues. As a result, disagreements began to erupt over these complex issues. In November 1909, Attorney General George Wickersham signed a two-page order creating "The Public Lands Division" of the Department of Justice to address the critical litigation that ensued. He assigned all cases concerning "enforcement of the Public Land Law", including Indian rights cases, to the new Division, and transferred a staff of nine – six attorneys and three stenographers – to carry out these responsibilities.

As the nation grew and developed, so did the responsibilities of the Division, and its name changed to the "Environment and Natural Resources Division" (ENRD) to better reflect those changes. Today, the Division, which is organized into ten sections, has offices in Washington, D.C., Boston, Denver, Sacramento, San Francisco and Seattle, and a staff of over 600 people. It currently has approximately 7,000 active cases and matters, and has represented virtually every federal agency in courts in all 50 states and U.S. territories.

== Division responsibilities ==
The Division initiates and pursues legal action to enforce federal pollution abatement laws and obtain compliance with environmental protection and conservation statutes. ENRD also represents the United States in all matters concerning protection, use, and development of the nation's natural resources and public lands. The Division defends suits challenging all of the foregoing laws, and fulfills the federal government's responsibility to litigate on behalf of Native American tribes and individual Native Americans. The Division is also responsible for the acquisition of real property by eminent domain for the federal government, and brings and defends cases under wildlife protection laws. ENRD's legal successes have reduced harmful discharges into the air, water, and land, enabled clean-up of contaminated waste sites, and ensured proper disposal of solid and hazardous waste.

== Office of the Assistant Attorney General ==
The head of the Environment and Natural Resources Division is an Assistant Attorney General for the Environment and Natural Resources (AAG-ENRD) appointed by the president of the United States.

ENRD Assistant Attorneys General:

1. Ernest Knaebel (1911–1916)
2. Francis J. Kearful (1917–1919)
3. Frank K. Nebeker (1919–1920)
4. Leslie C. Garnett (1920–1921)
5. William D. Riter (1921–1924)
6. Ira K. Wells (1924–1925)
7. Bertice M. Parmenter (1925–1929)
8. Seth W. Richardson (1929–1933)
9. Harry W. Blair (1933–1937)
10. Carl McFarland (1937–1939)
11. Norman Littell (1939–1944)
12. David L. Bazelon (1946–1947)
13. A. Devitt Vanech (1947–1951)
14. William Amory Underhill (1951–1952)
15. James M. McInerney (1952–1953)
16. Perry W. Morton (1953–1961)
17. Ramsey Clark (1961–1965)
18. Edwin L. Weisl Jr. (1965–1967)
19. Clyde O. Martz (1967–1969)
20. Shiro Kashiwa (1969–1972)
21. Kent Frizzell (1972–1973)
22. Wallace H. Johnson (1973–1975)
23. Peter Taft (1975–1977)
24. James W. Moorman (1977–1981)
25. Carol E. Dinkins (1981–1983)
26. F. Henry Habicht II (1983–1987)
27. Roger J. Marzulla (1988–1989)
28. Richard B. Stewart (1989–1991)
29. Lois J. Schiffer (1993–2001)
30. Thomas L. Sansonetti (2001–2005)
31. Sue Ellen Wooldridge (2005–2007)
32. Ronald J. Tenpas (2007–2009)
33. Ignacia S. Moreno (2009–2013)
34. John C. Cruden (2015–2017)
35. Jeffrey Clark (2018–2021)
36. Jean E. Williams (acting) (2021)
37. Todd Kim (2021-2025)
38. Adam F. Gustafson (acting) (2025-)

== Organization ==
The Environment and Natural Resources Division is overseen by an Assistant Attorney General. The Assistant Attorney General is assisted by a Principal Deputy Assistant Attorney General and four Deputy Assistant Attorneys General, who each oversee a different branch of the Division's sections. The Division divides itself into several sections, each of which has its own unique areas of expertise. A Section Chief heads each section, assisted by one or more Deputy or Assistant Section Chiefs.

- Appellate Section – In a typical year, the Section handles around 250 cases, including several Supreme Court merits cases. More than half of the cases are in the Ninth and Tenth Circuits due to the large amount of federal land in the West. The Section's work includes appeals from district court cases under ENRD's purview, encompassing more than 200 statutes, and petitions for review for clients such as the Department of Energy, the Federal Aviation Administration, and the Federal Energy Regulatory Commission.
- Environmental Crimes Section – The Section prosecutes individuals and corporations who violate our environmental protection laws, including the Clean Water Act, Clear Air Act, and other pollution laws. The Section also brings criminal actions to protect wildlife and marine species under the Endangered Species Act and the Lacey Act.
- Environmental Defense Section – The Section defends challenges to agency conduct under the pollution control laws (including CERCLA). The Section has an extensive petition for review practice, defending EPA rulemaking that is challenged directly in the courts of appeals. The Section brings Clean Water Act enforcement cases to protect wetlands.
- Environmental Enforcement Section – The Section brings civil enforcement actions under the federal environmental protection laws, for: civil penalties and injunctive relief for violations of the Clean Air Act, Clean Water Act, Safe Drinking Water Act, and other pollution abatement laws; cleanup and cost recovery for hazardous waste sites and oil spills under CERCLA (the Superfund law) and the Oil Pollution Act; and damages for injury to natural resources under the trusteeship of federal agencies.
- Executive Office – The Section provides administrative support to the Division, including financial management, human resources, security, technology and litigation support. The Section also provides support to other litigating divisions and client agencies
- Tribal Resources Section – The Section represents the United States in litigation to protect tribal lands, resources, jurisdiction, and treaty rights. The Section's affirmative suits safeguard water rights, promote hunting and fishing rights, collect damages for trespass on Indian lands, and establish reservation boundaries and rights to land. Nearly half of the Section's work involves defense of federal statutes, regulations, programs, and actions benefitting Indian tribes and their members.
- Land Acquisition Section – The Section is responsible for: affirmative condemnation cases, appraisal reviews, and title work. The Section's docket impacts: border security, military preparedness, flood protection, natural resources conservation, federal buildings and infrastructure.
- Law and Policy Section – The Section handles a broad variety of environmental legal and policy matters, including: reviewing pending regulations and legislation; coordinating the Division's international work, including training and capacity building abroad; and Amicus practice in District Courts.
- Natural Resources Section – The Section defends suits relating to federal land management decisions, tribal trust, takings, the National Environmental Policy Act, water rights and water compacts, offshore and subsurface mineral rights, and international boundary disputes.
- Wildlife and Marine Resources Section – The Section defends cases brought under federal wildlife and marine species conservation laws, including the Endangered Species Act, the Migratory Bird Treaty Act and the Marine Mammal Protection Act.
