= Clyde O. Martz =

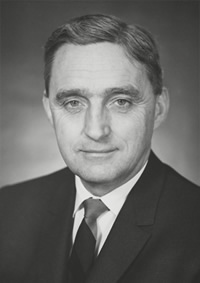

19th United States Assistant Attorney General for the Environment and Natural Resources
- In office 1967 – January 20, 1969
- President: Lyndon B. Johnson
- Preceded by: Edwin L. Weisl Jr.
- Succeeded by: Shiro Kashiwa

Personal details
- Born: August 14, 1920 Lincoln, Nebraska
- Died: May 18, 2010 (aged 89) Albuquerque, New Mexico
- Party: Democratic
- Education: University of Nebraska (BA); Harvard Law School (JD)

Clyde O. Martz (August 14, 1920 – May 18, 2010) was an American attorney who served as the United States Assistant Attorney General for the Environment and Natural Resources from 1967 to 1969. He was also a law professor at the University of Colorado Law School and the Sturm College of Law.

He died on May 18, 2010, in Albuquerque, New Mexico at age 89.
