= F. Henry Habicht II =

U.S. Assistant Attorney General

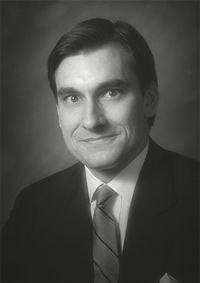

7th Deputy Administrator of the United States Environmental Protection Agency
- In office May 19, 1989 – January 20, 1993
- President: George H. W. Bush
- Preceded by: A. James Barnes
- Succeeded by: Jonathan Z. Cannon (Acting)

26th United States Assistant Attorney General for the Environment and Natural Resources
- In office 1983–1987
- President: Ronald Reagan
- Preceded by: Carol E. Dinkins
- Succeeded by: Roger J. Marzulla

Personal details
- Born: Frank Henry Habicht II; April 10, 1953 (age 71); Oak Park, Illinois
- Political party: Republican

F. Henry "Hank" Habicht II (born April 10, 1953) is an American attorney who served as the United States Assistant Attorney General for the Environment and Natural Resources from 1983 to 1987 and as the Deputy Administrator of the United States Environmental Protection Agency from 1989 to 1993.

== Early life and education ==
Hank graduated magna cum laude from Princeton University’s Woodrow Wilson School of Public and International Affairs in 1975 and received his J.D. degree from the University of Virginia in 1978.
