= Offshore wind port =

Port facility used to support construction and operation of an offshore wind project

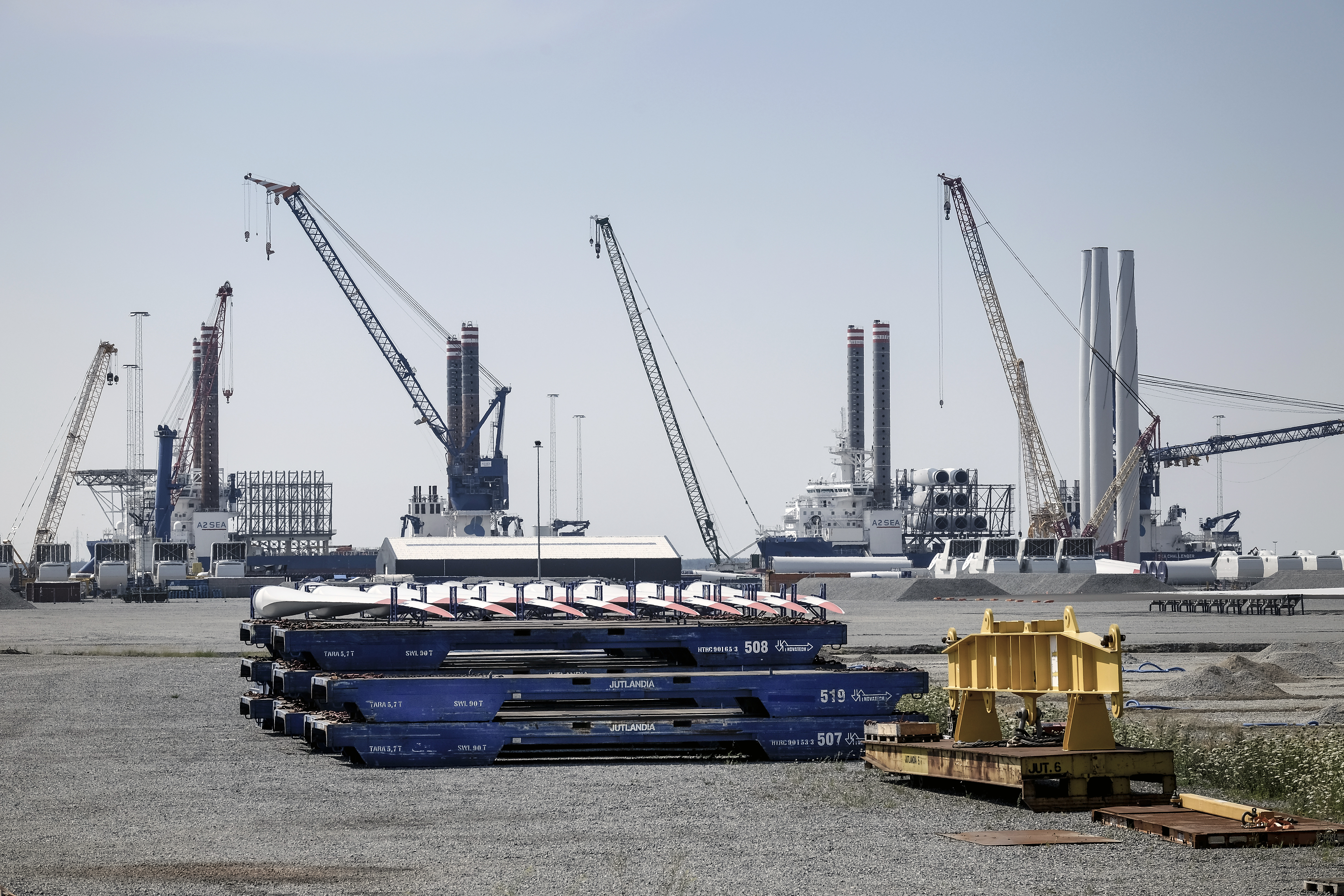
A2SEA ships at Esbjerg offshore wind port

An offshore wind port describes several distinct types of port facilities that are used to support manufacturing, construction and operation of an offshore wind power project. Offshore wind turbine components are larger than onshore wind components. Handling of such large components requires special equipment. Transporting of components between manufacturing and assembling facilities is to be minimized. As a result, a number of offshore wind port facilities have been built in areas with a high concentration of offshore wind developments. For large offshore wind farm projects, some offshore wind ports have become strategic hubs of the industry's supply chain.

The Port of Esbjerg in Denmark is considered the world's largest offshore wind port.

== Types ==
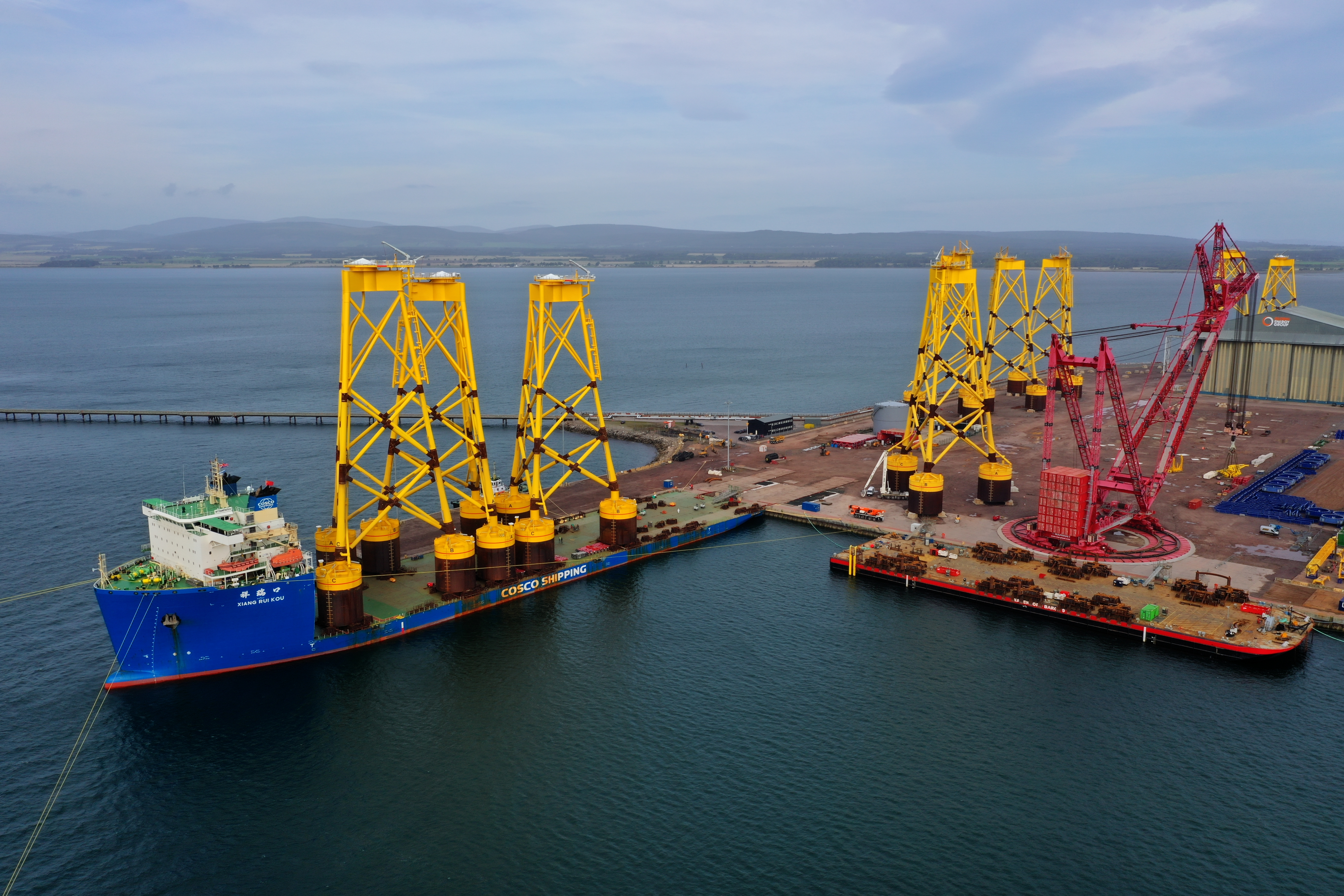
Ring crane and tripod foundations on heavy-lift ship

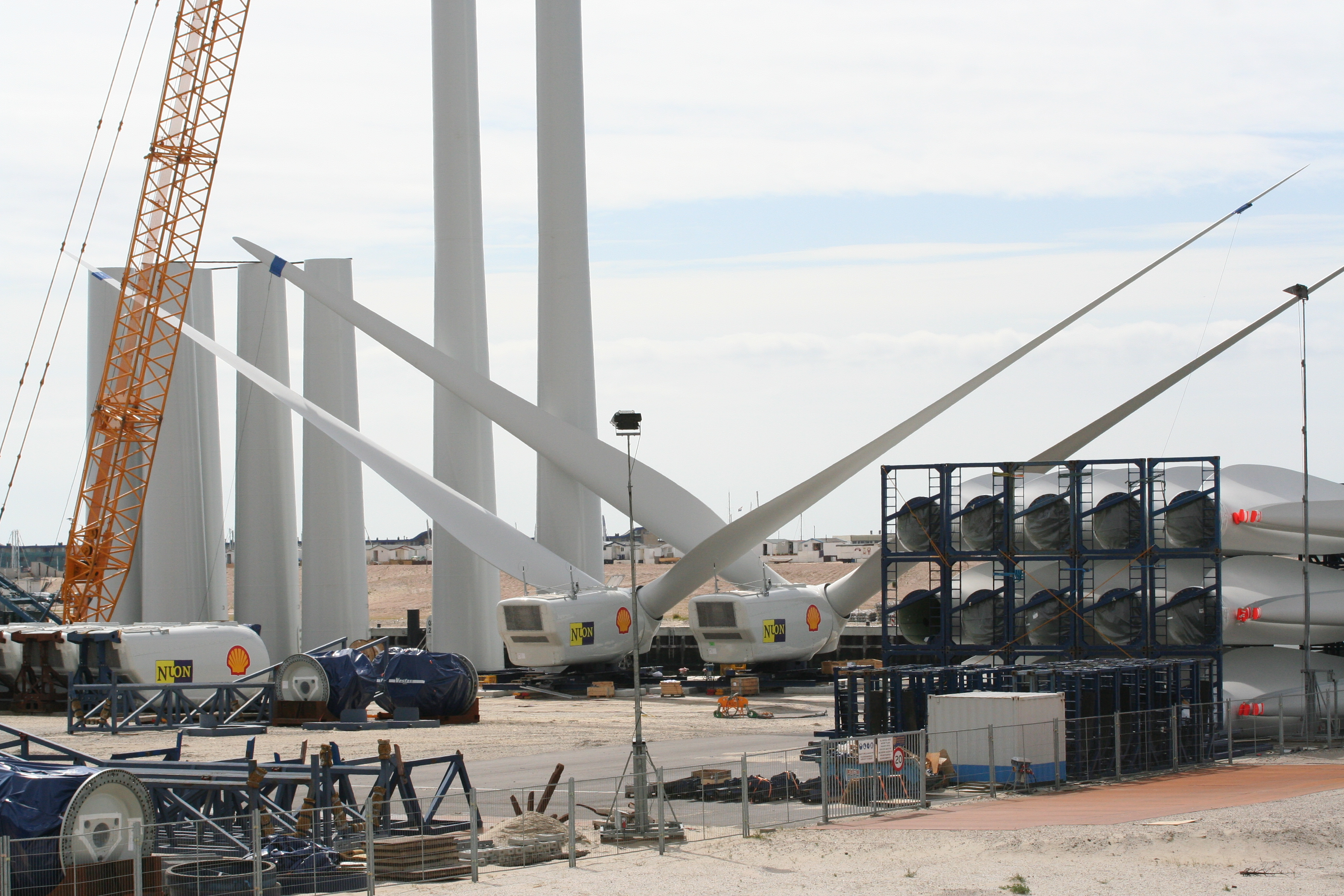
Wind turbines require much space for assembly and transport

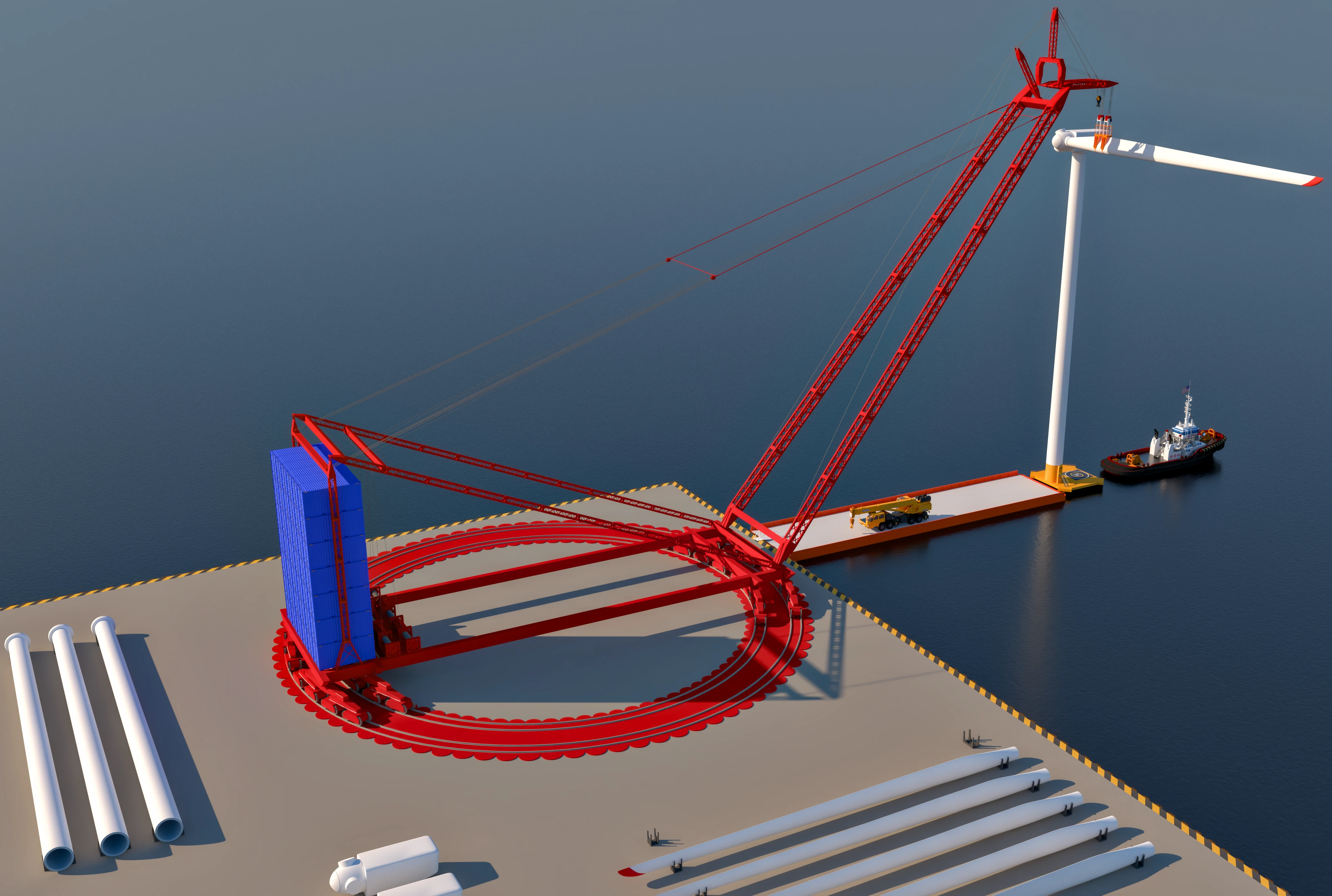
3D sketch of a ring crane doing shoreline assembly of an offshore wind turbine

=== Small oceanic ports ===
These are small port facilities to launch survey vessels used in an early stage of an offshore wind farm development.

=== Manufacturing ports ===
Large offshore wind turbine components are difficult to transport over land. Locating a manufacturing facility at a port is more desirable. Subcomponents and materials may be brought through roads or railways. After components are built, they are typically shipped to a marshaling port for the final assembly.

=== Marshaling ports ===
Marshaling ports (also known as staging ports) are used to collect and store wind turbine components prior to loading them onto wind turbine installation vessels. They are preferably located where there is unrestricted air draft to the wind farm site.

=== Operating and maintenance ports ===
Operating and maintenance ports house facilities and vessels that are required for ongoing operating and maintenance of offshore wind farms. This may include part warehouse, offices, and training facilities.

== By region ==
=== Europe ===
The six leading offshore wind ports in Europe service wind farms in the North Sea. Their respective countries signed the Esbjerg Declaration in 2022 in which they agreed to coordinate supply chain activities to optimize the manufacture and delivery of wind turbine components.

- Port of Esbjerg, (DK), the world's largest offshore wind port
- Port of Ostend, (BE)
- Groningen Seaports/Eemshaven, (NL)
- Niedersachsen Ports/Cuxhaven, (DE)
- Nantes/Saint-Nazaire, (FR)
- Humber/Port of Hull (UK)

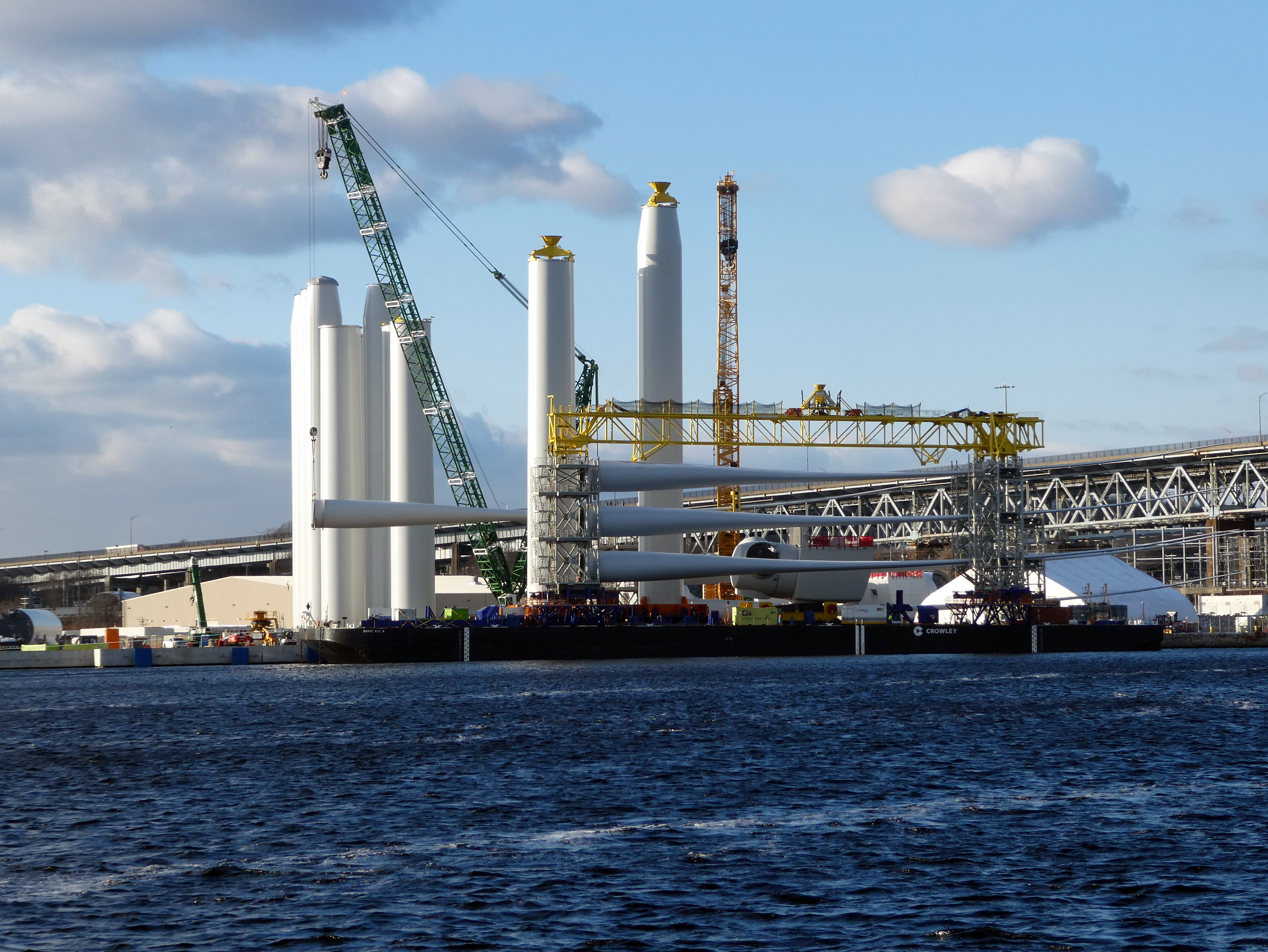
Turbine components at Port of New London

=== United States ===
As of 2021, offshore wind power in the United States was described as a "burgeoning" industry. At that time, a number of ports were proposing to build or convert facilities to handle the large components needed to build potential offshore wind farms.

On the East Coast, from north to south, there are operating or potential ports. In August 2025 the Trump administration's Department of Transportation withdrew or cancelled funding for many pro jects.

- Salem Harbor (MA)
- Port of New Bedford (MA)
- Brayton Point Commerce Center/Mount Hope Bay (MA)
- Port of Providence (RI)
- State Pier, Port of New London (CT)
- South Brooklyn Marine Terminal (NY)
- Arthur Kill Terminal (NY)
- Port of Paulsboro (NJ)
- New Jersey Wind Port, the "first offshore wind port" in the United States, which broke ground in late 2021
- Port of Baltimore (MD) - Sparrows Point
- Portsmouth Marine Terminal (VA)
