= Arthur Kill Terminal =

Proposed offshore wind port in Staten Island

Coordinates: 40.525°N 74.247°W

Arthur Kill Terminal is a proposed purpose-built offshore wind port on the Arthur Kill on the west shore of Staten Island, New York. It is intended to be a wind turbine assembly and staging area for various offshore wind farms in the New York Bight. It is planned to be located on 32 acres (13 ha) just south of the Outerbridge Crossing. The site, which would allow for the docking of heavy-lift ships, is not hindered by air draft restrictions since there is no bridge downstream of the facility.

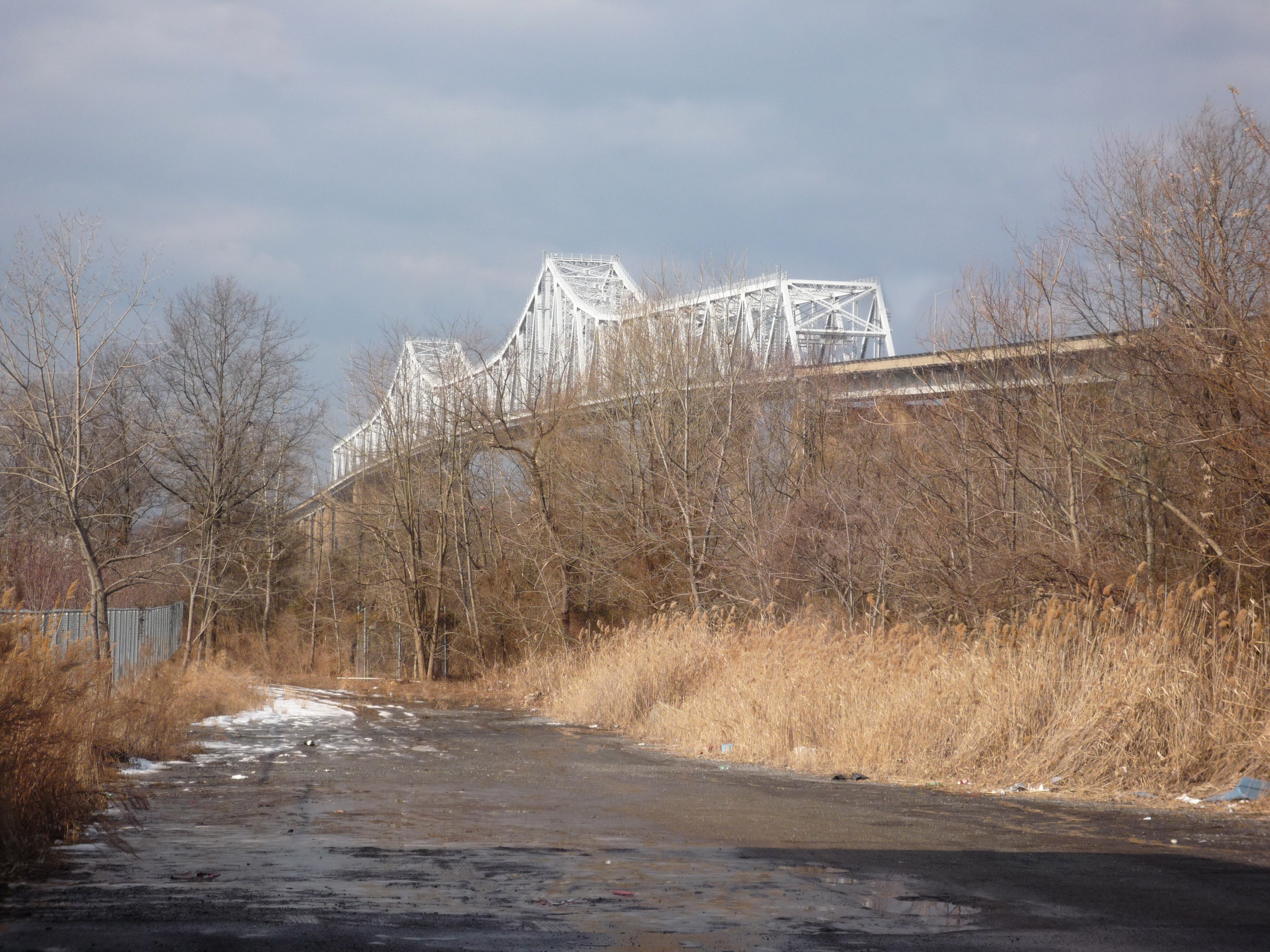
Site of Arthur Kill Terminal is at foot of the south side Outerbridge Crossing

== Funding and development ==
The Arthur Kill Terminal is being developed by a partnership with Empire State Development Corporation (ESD). In October 2022 the project received a $48 million grant from the United States Maritime Administration (part of the US Department of Transportation) for dredging the kill adjacent to the upland site. At that time, construction was expected to begin in late 2023 and projected to begin operating in late 2025.

Despite the loss of federal funding 2025, the project is still expected to be built.

== See also ==
- Offshore wind power in the United States
- List of offshore wind farms in the United States
- Wind power in New York
- Empire Wind
- New Bedford Marine Commerce Terminal
- New Jersey Wind Port
