= Ignacia S. Moreno =

American lawyer (born 1961)

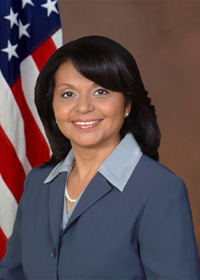
Ignacia S. Moreno

Ignacia Soledad Moreno (born May 8, 1961) is an American lawyer who was the Assistant Attorney General for the United States Department of Justice Environment and Natural Resources Division until June 2013.

== Early life and education ==
Born in Cartagena, Colombia, Moreno earned a bachelor's degree in February 1986 from New York University and a J.D. degree from New York University School of Law in 1990.

== Professional career ==
Moreno began her career in publishing, working for Berkley Publishing Group from November 1983 until August 1986 as the Assistant to the editorial director.

From August 1986 until August 1987, Moreno served as a Trial Preparation Assistant in the Manhattan District Attorney's Office's Sex Crimes Prosecution unit.

During law school, Moreno worked from June 1988 until August 1988 for the United States Senate Committee on the Judiciary as a legal intern for then-U.S. Sen. Joe Biden. She also worked as a summer associate for Kaye Scholer LLP in Washington, D.C. from June 1989 until August 1989.

After graduating law school, Moreno worked from September 1990 until January 1994 as an Associate at the law firm of Hogan & Hartson in Washington, D.C.

From January 1994 until 1995, Moreno joined the United States Department of Justice, serving as the Special Assistant to the Assistant Attorney General for the United States Department of Justice Environment and Natural Resources Division, Lois Schiffer, who held that post from 1993 until 2001. Then, Moreno served from January 1995 until January 2001 as the Counsel and then as the Principal Counsel to the Assistant Attorney General in the Environment and Natural Resources Division.

From June 2001 until August 2001, Moreno served as a lawyer for Lawcorps. Then, from October 2001 until January 2004, Moreno served as an "of counsel" lawyer at the Washington, D.C. law firm of Springs & Hollingsworth. From February 2004 until September 2006, Moreno served as a partner at the firm.

In September 2006, Moreno joined General Electric as the firm's Counsel for the Northeast/Midwest Regions and International, Corporate Environmental Programs.

== Work in the Obama administration ==
On May 12, 2009, President Obama announced his intent to nominate Moreno to the post of Assistant Attorney General for the United States Department of Justice Environment and Natural Resources Division. On June 8, 2009, Obama formally nominated Moreno for the post. The United States Senate Committee on the Judiciary voted Moreno's nomination out of committee on September 24, 2009. The full Senate confirmed Moreno in a 93–0 vote on November 5, 2009.

In May 2013, Moreno announced that she would leave her post in the U.S. Department of Justice in June 2013.
