= Lois J. Schiffer =

American attorney

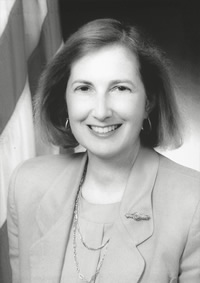

29th United States Assistant Attorney General for the Environment and Natural Resources
- In office 1993 – January 20, 2001
- President: Bill Clinton
- Preceded by: Richard B. Stewart
- Succeeded by: Tom Sansonetti

Personal details
- Born: Lois Jane Schiffer; February 22, 1945 (age 81) Washington, D.C., U.S.
- Party: Democratic
- Education: Radcliffe College (BA); Harvard Law School (JD)

Lois J. Schiffer (born February 22, 1945) is an American attorney who served as the United States Assistant Attorney General for the Environment and Natural Resources from 1993 to 2001.
