= Offshore wind power in the United States =

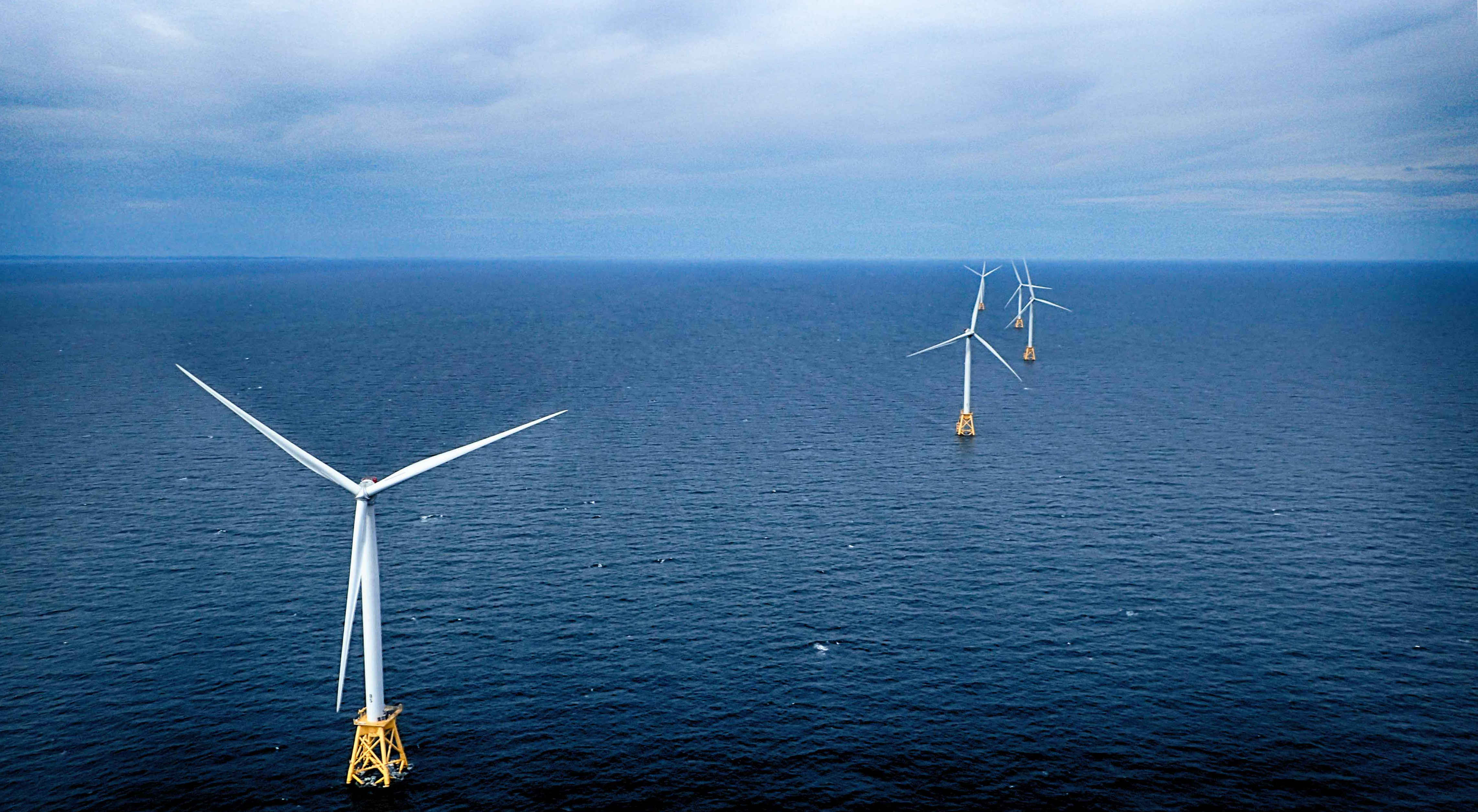
The 30 megawatt (MW) Block Island Wind Farm opened off the coast of Rhode Island in 2016 as the first offshore wind farm in the United States.

Offshore wind power in the United States is in the early stages of development and shifting public opinion. In 2022, the National Renewable Energy Laboratory (NREL) estimated that the country has a "technical" resource potential of 1,476 GW (fixed-bottom) and 2,773 GW (floating) offshore wind power. Offshore wind projects are currently being developed along the East Coast, in the Great Lakes, and on the Pacific Coast, with a focus on areas with high wind potential.

The first operational offshore wind farm in the U.S., Block Island Wind Farm, became operational in 2016. The first commercial-scale offshore wind farm (greater than 100 MW), South Fork Wind (132 MW), began operation in federal waters off the coast of Rhode Island in 2024, with full commissioning on March 14, 2024. As of March 6, 2025, the total installed offshore wind capacity in the U.S. was 174 MW. Power from the first turbine of Vineyard Wind 1 started flowing into the New England grid in January 2024. Construction of the wind farm was completed when the final wind turbine blades were installed on March 13, 2026.

Construction was paused in late December 2025 due to a Trump administration order to pause all offshore wind leases to review "national security risks". A preliminary court injunction in January 2026 allowed construction to resume while the lawsuit proceeded.

== History and background ==
Offshore wind power in the United States began to develop in the early 2000s. The Cape Wind project, proposed for Nantucket Sound in Massachusetts, was the first significant offshore wind project attempted in the U.S. However, it faced numerous challenges, including legal disputes, opposition from local communities, and environmental concerns, and was eventually canceled in 2017.

The first operational offshore wind farm in the U.S., Block Island Wind Farm, was completed in 2016 off the coast of Rhode Island. It consists of five turbines and has a capacity of 30 MW.

In the following years, states along the East Coast, including Massachusetts, New Jersey, and New York, began to set renewable energy targets that included offshore wind, creating a market for new projects. In 2021, the Biden administration announced its goal of installing 30 gigawatts of offshore wind power by 2030, as part of its broader efforts to combat climate change and promote clean energy.

The first commercial-scale offshore wind farm (greater than 100 MW), South Fork Wind (132 MW), began operation in federal waters off the coast of Rhode Island in 2024, with full commissioning on March 14, 2024. As of March 6, 2025, the total installed offshore wind capacity in the U.S. was 174 MW. Power from the first turbine of Vineyard Wind 1 started flowing into the ISO New England grid in January 2024. Construction of the wind farm was completed when the final wind turbine blades were installed on March 13, 2026.

Construction was paused in late December 2025 due to a Trump administration order to pause all offshore wind leases to review "national security risks". A preliminary court injunction in January 2026 allowed construction to resume while the lawsuit proceeded.

Impacted projects included Coastal Virginia Offshore Wind, Revolution Wind, Empire Wind 1, and Sunrise Wind. US$billions had been invested into these projects before the pause sent the industry into disarray. Additional projects that have not started construction, but have received Records of Decision (RODs) are Ocean Wind, New England Wind, Maryland Offshore Wind, Atlantic Shores South, and SouthCoast Wind.

== Potential and targets ==
In 2021 the Biden administration announced a target of 30 GW of offshore wind by 2030. As of 2022, the US had 0.042 GW of offshore wind power, in addition to which Vineyard Wind started coming online in stages on January 2, 2024.

=== East Coast ===
There is more than 16 GW of capacity planned for the Atlantic Coast. The map at right shows leases executed by the Bureau of Ocean Energy Management (BOEM) for the outer continental shelf off the Massachusetts and Rhode Island coasts, the first offshore wind energy area to be opened for auction, in 2014 (lease assignments as of 2022).

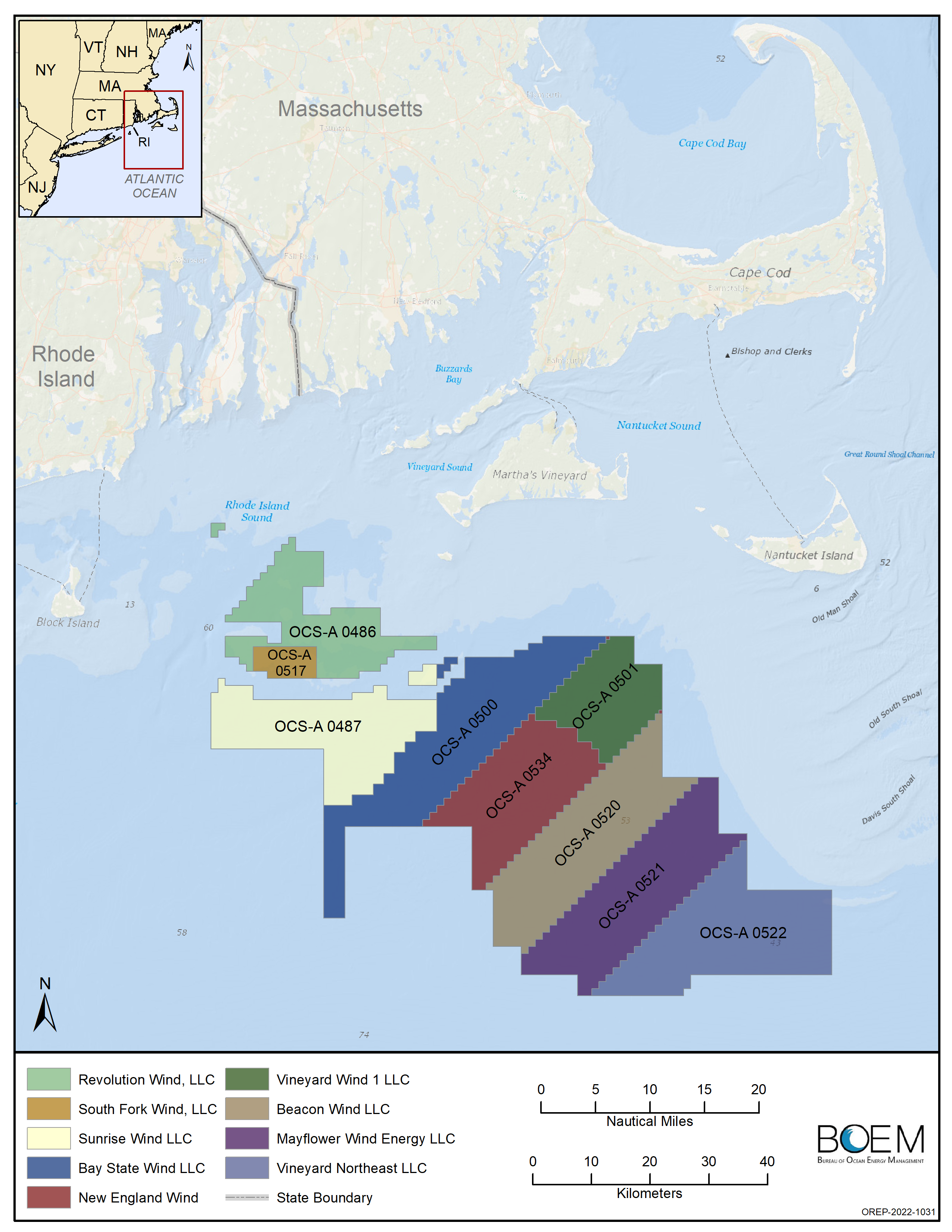
Wind energy lease areas off the southern coasts of Massachusetts and Rhode Island as of October, 2022

Because of its shallow waters and average offshore wind speeds in excess of 9 m/s, the coast off Massachusetts has the greatest potential offshore wind production in the US, at more than 1 million GWh per year, followed by that of the Gulf Coast states. Massachusetts energy law committed the state to purchasing 5,600 MW of offshore wind capacity by 2035. The shallow waters off the New England coast and proximity to load centers such as Boston, Providence, and Long Island make this area the most economical for both construction of wind farms and delivery of power to favorable nodes on the electric grid.

In 2019, the New York Climate Leadership and Community Protection Act was enacted. Among other requirements, the law mandates that 70% of the state's electricity be generated from renewable sources by 2030. To meet this goal, New York hopes to install 9,000 MW of offshore wind capacity by 2035.New York has set a target of procuring 9,000 MW of offshore wind capacity by 2035. In February 2022, an auction for 6 lease areas in the New York Bight ended at $4.37 billion, with one area going for over one billion dollars. The combined areas could yield more than 5.6 gigawatts for an annual energy production of 19.6 TWh.

The state of New Jersey is aiming for 7,500 MW of offshore wind power capacity by 2035 and 11,000 MW by 2040. To achieve these goals, the state has awarded renewable energy certificates to several projects, in addition to two whose development was discontinued by Orsted.

North Carolina also has high potential for offshore wind production, with above 600 thousand GWh per year, the vast majority of which comes from wind speeds greater than 8 m/s. Furthermore, this industry is expected to add $140 billion and tens of thousands of jobs to North Carolina's economy by 2035. There are currently two offshore wind farms planned in North Carolina, one in Kitty Hawk, and one in Long Bay.

Several other states have issued offshore wind procurement mandates in the Atlantic. Rhode Island has a goal of purchasing 1,430 MW by 2030. Connecticut has set a procurement target of 2,000 MW by 2030. Maryland aims to meet 8,500 MW by 2031. Virginia has set a procurement mandate for 5,200 MW by 2034. Maine has a goal to purchase 3,000 MW by 2040.

Wind speeds at various locations off of the East Coast
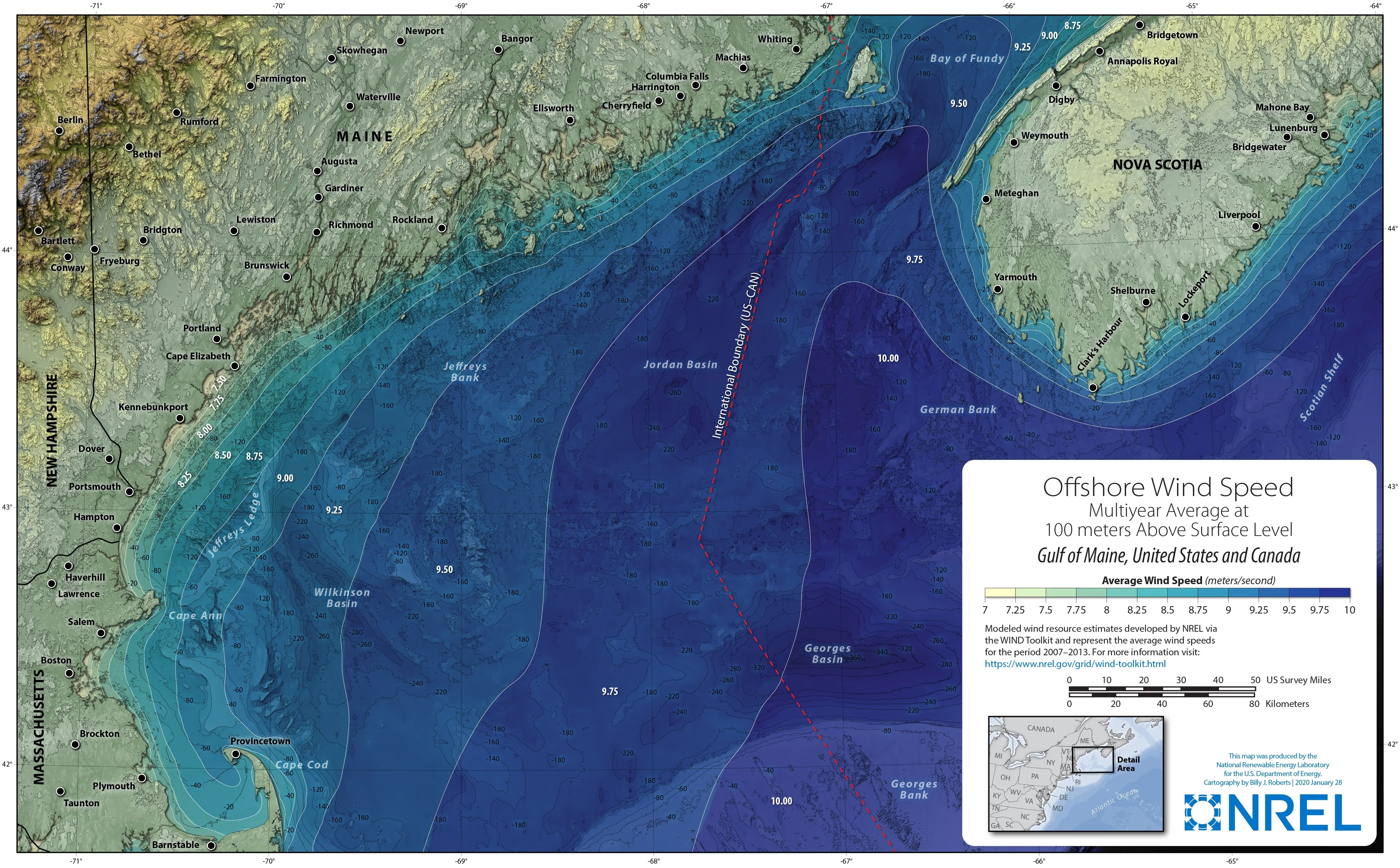
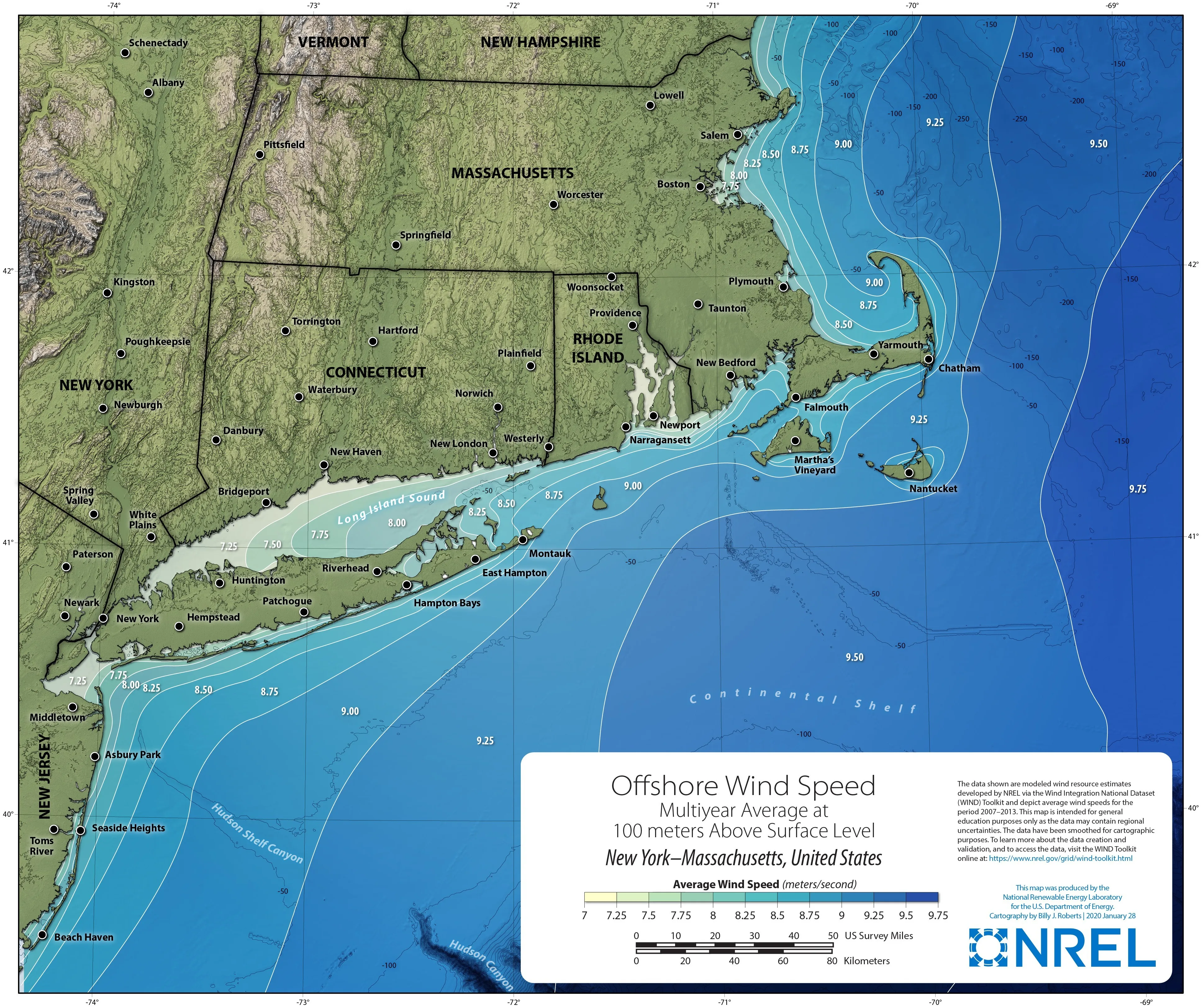
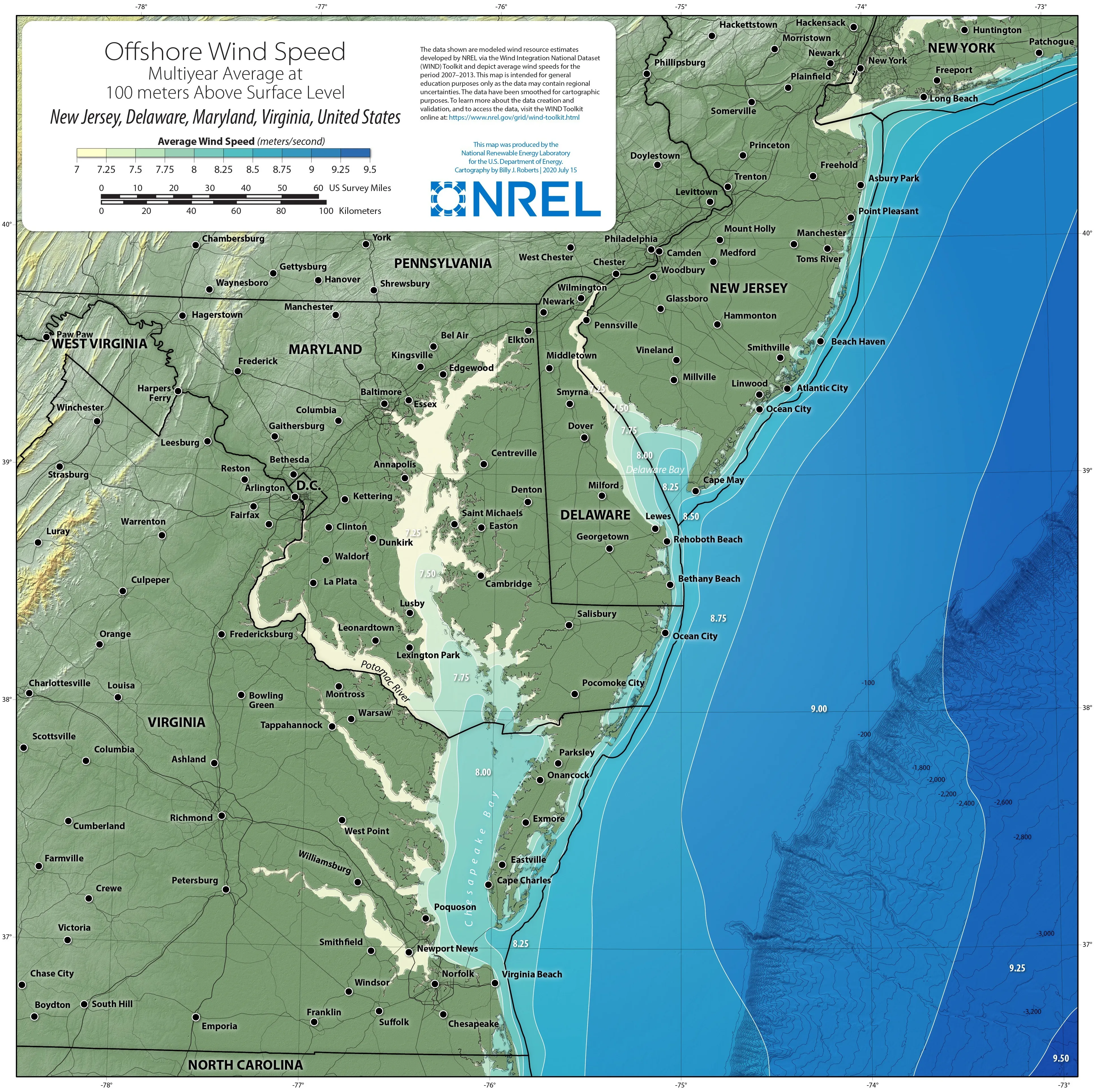
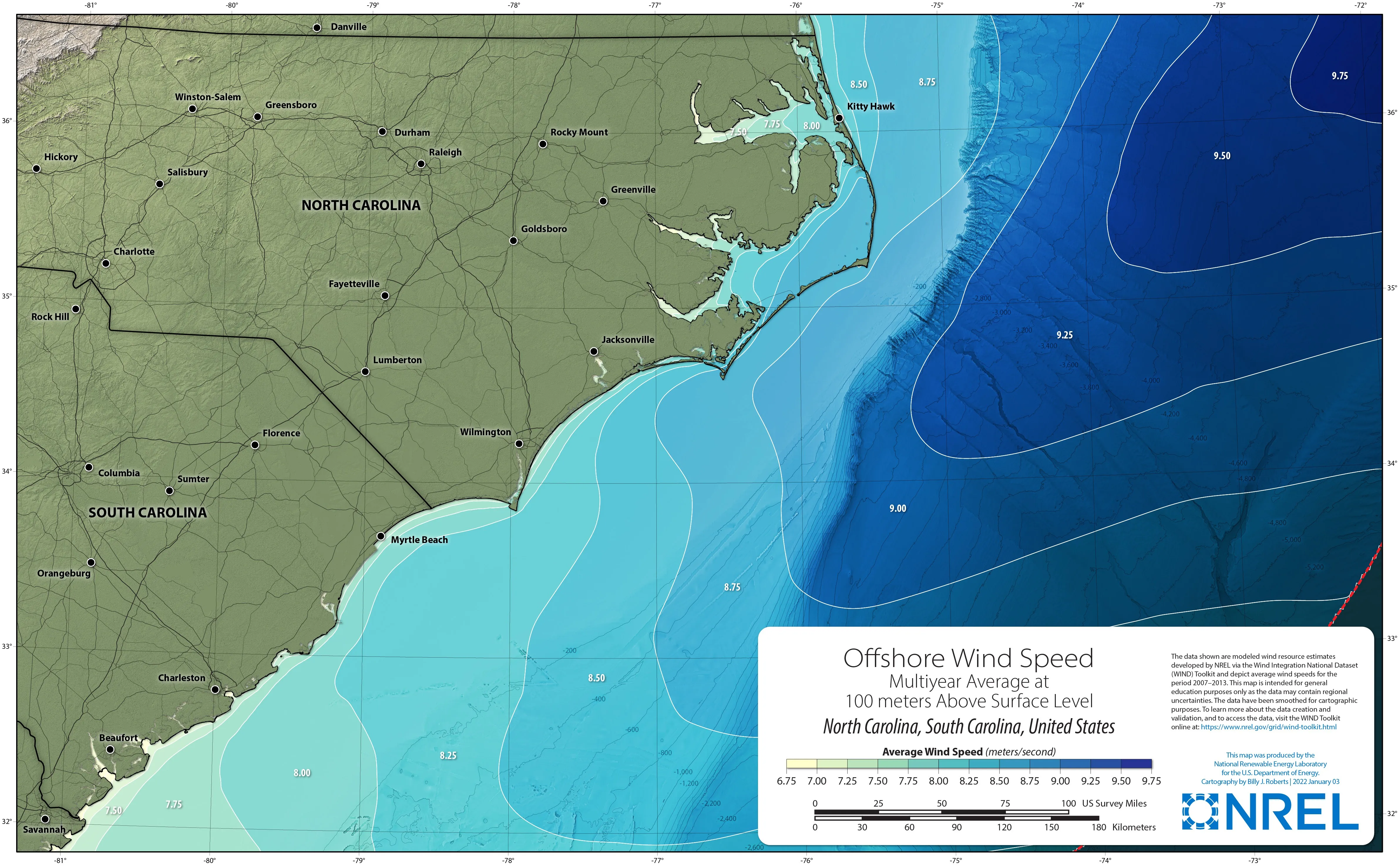

=== Great Lakes ===
The NREL estimates that the Great Lakes have a potential capacity of 160 GW that could be generated by fixed-bottom turbines. If floating foundation technology becomes viable, an additional capacity of 415 GW could be installed.

Despite the high potential, there are still obstacles to construction and development. Both the St. Lawrence Seaway and Welland Canal locks that connect the lakes to the Atlantic Ocean are too narrow to accommodate the large ocean vessels used to install offshore turbines. All the materials must either be transported through these locks, or built on the lakes themselves.

A Great Lakes project would be the first to be installed in an icy climate. While it is not expected to be a significant hurdle to development, it does raise some uncertainty.

The turbines would have to be constructed far enough from shore to assuage concerns about their impact on viewsheds. Other issues that might hinder deployment include concerns about bird and bat collisions and competition with land-based utility-scale wind and solar installations that are currently less expensive than proposed offshore wind.

Some Great Lakes states have signed a bipartisan federal-state memorandum of understanding (MOU) to create the Great Lakes Offshore Wind Energy Consortium to support the review of proposed offshore wind energy projects. Illinois, Michigan, Minnesota, New York, and Pennsylvania are all currently parties to the MOU.

The Illinois House of Representatives recently passed H.B.2132, or the Illinois Rust Belt to Green Belt Pilot Program Act. If the bill is enacted, Illinois will procure at least one new utility-scale offshore wind project with a capacity of at least 150 MW.

As part of efforts to develop a framework for a future wind energy industry, the Pennsylvania General Assembly passed H.B. 254 allowing the Department of General Services to lease certain submerged lands and associated wind, water, and solar resources within Erie County for the development of utility-scale offshore generation facilities. However, the bill was unable to advance beyond the House.

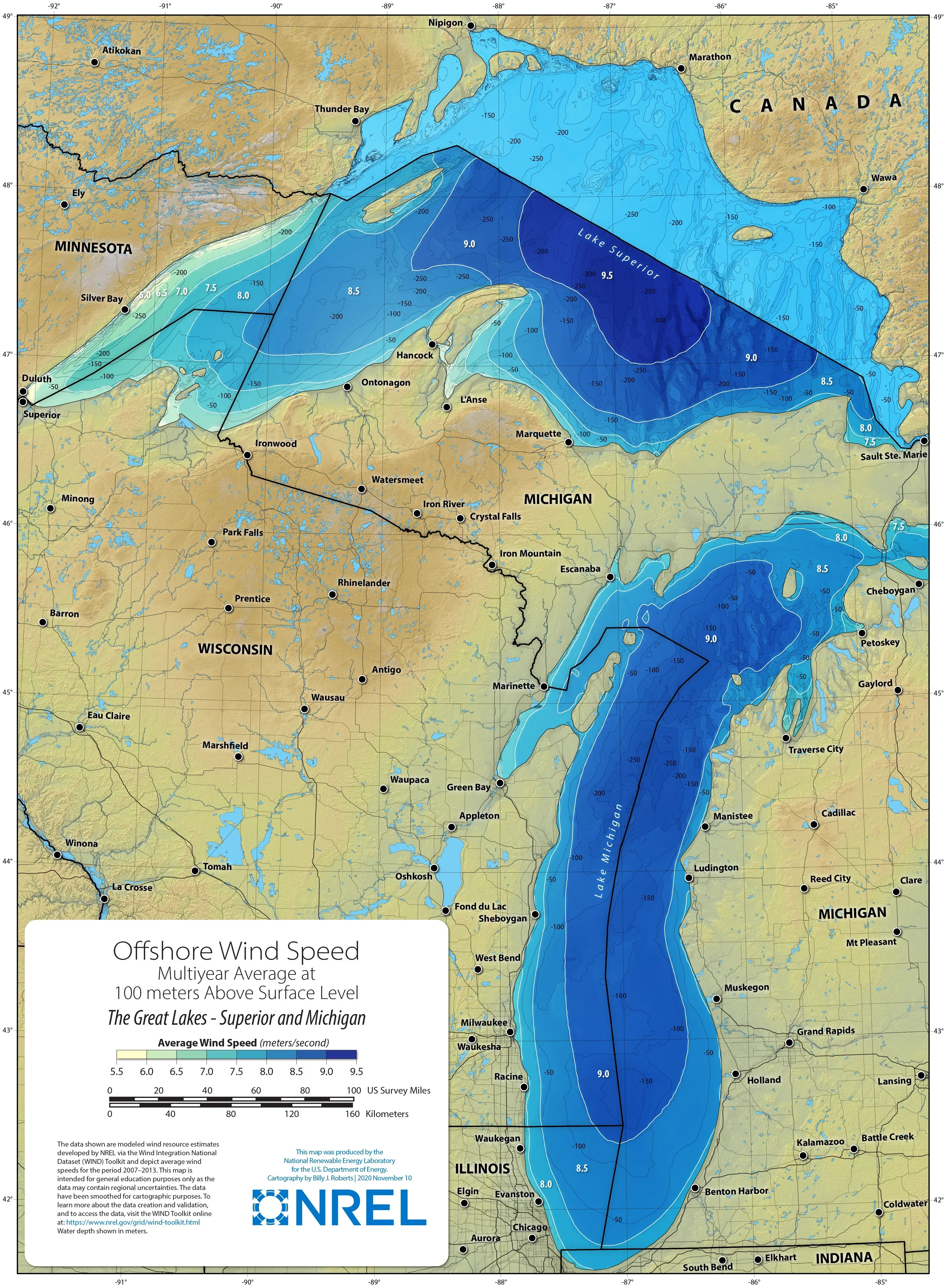
Great Lakes wind potential for Lake Superior and Lake Michigan

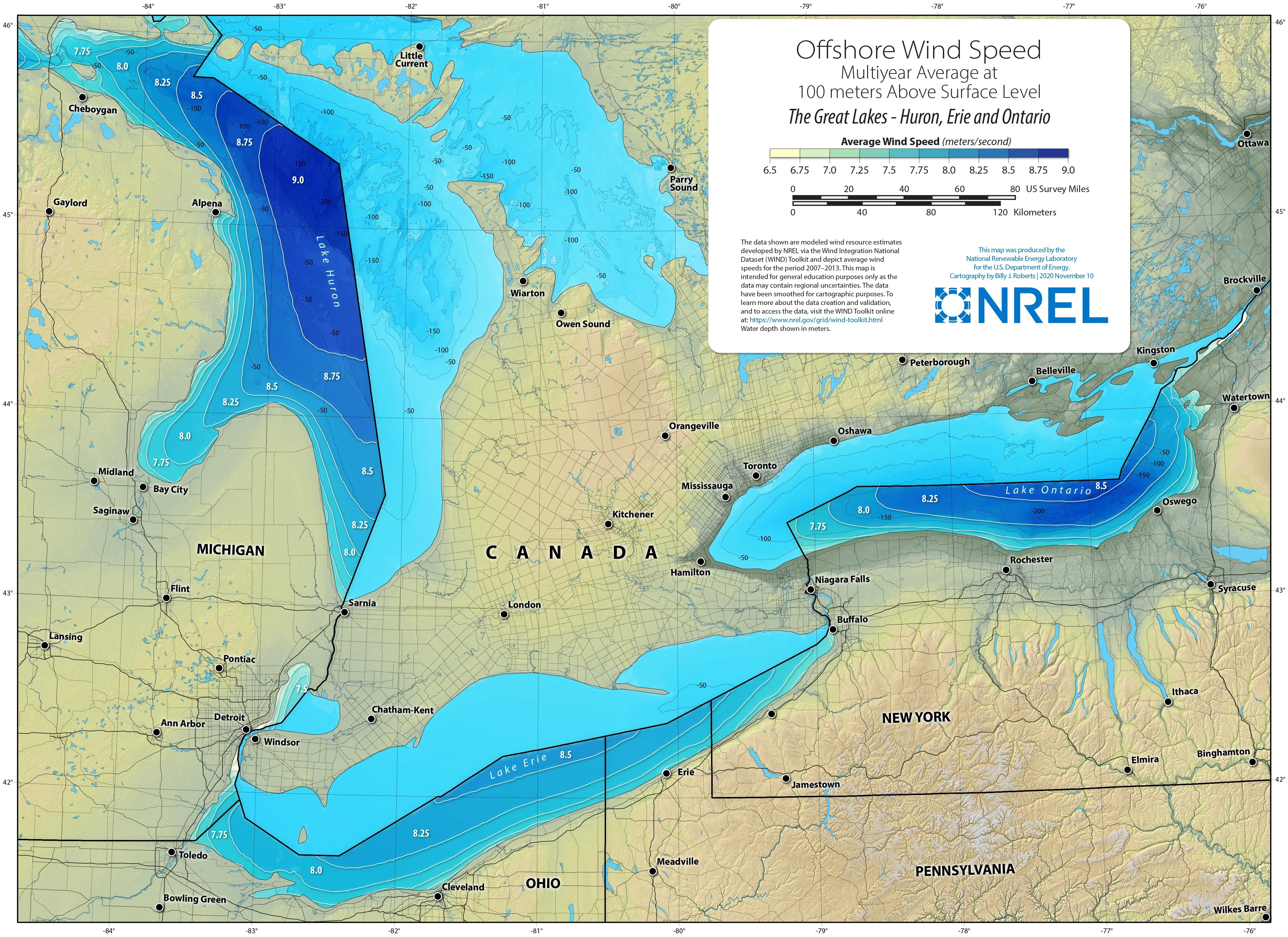
Wind potential for lakes Huron, Erie, and Ontario

=== West Coast and Hawaii ===
Although the waters of the Pacific Ocean tend to be deeper closer to shore than in the Atlantic, experts are still curious about the region's potential for offshore wind. There are an estimated 400 GW of potential capacity for offshore wind off the coast of the western United States. Because these waters are too deep for current fixed-bottom turbine technology, development will likely have to wait until floating foundations become viable. The Pacific Northwest National Laboratory suggests that floating turbines could bring 33 GW of offshore wind capacity by 2050 once this happens.

In 2021 the Biden administration approved large areas off the coast California for development of wind farms with floating turbines.

Farther away from the U.S. mainland, Hawaii has also been considered as a potential location to develop offshore wind. The National Renewable Energy Laboratory estimates that there are potentially 28 GW of offshore wind technical capacity that could be installed off the coast of Hawaii. However, this would also likely rely on the development of floating technology, as these waters are too deep for fixed-bottom foundations.

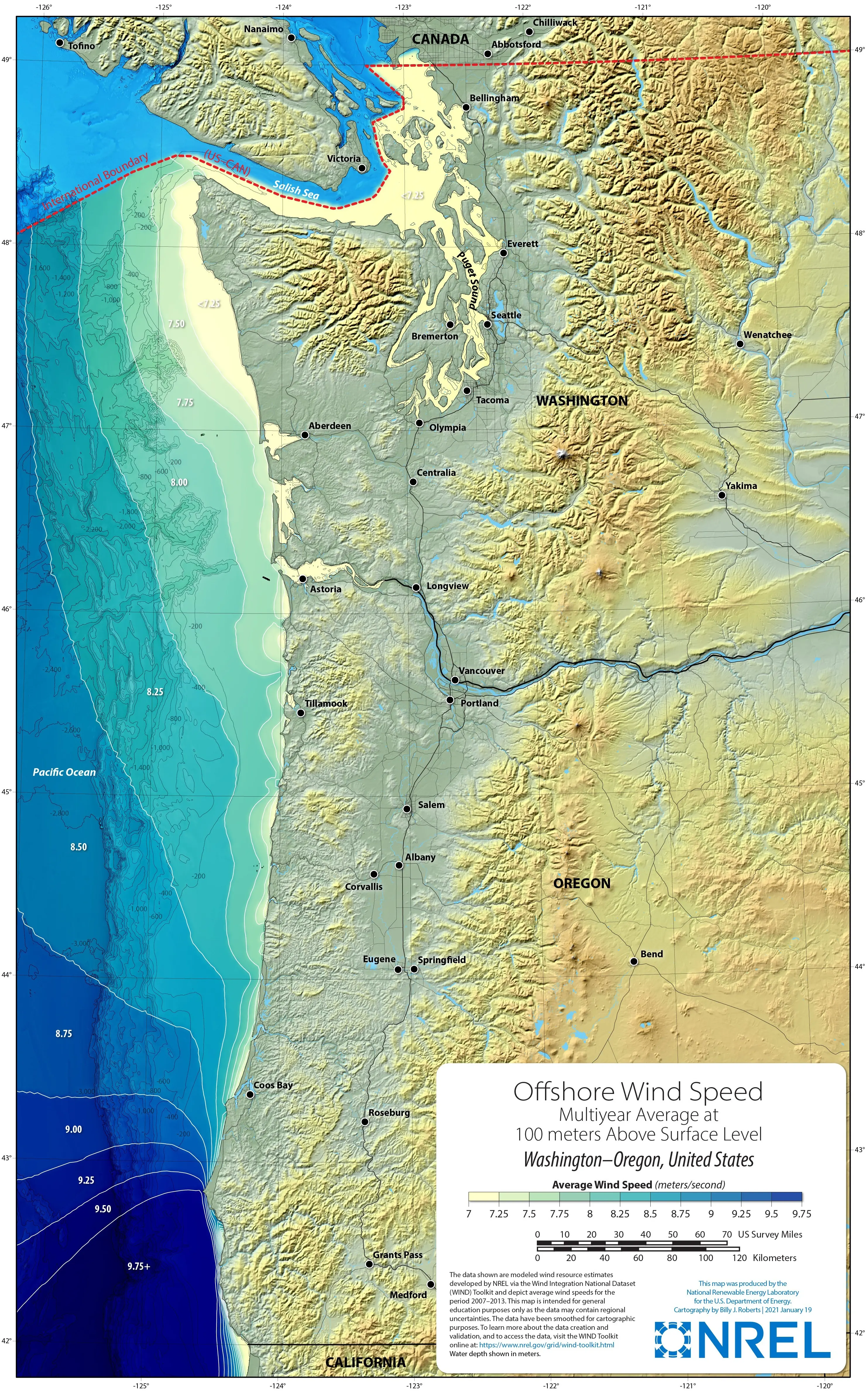
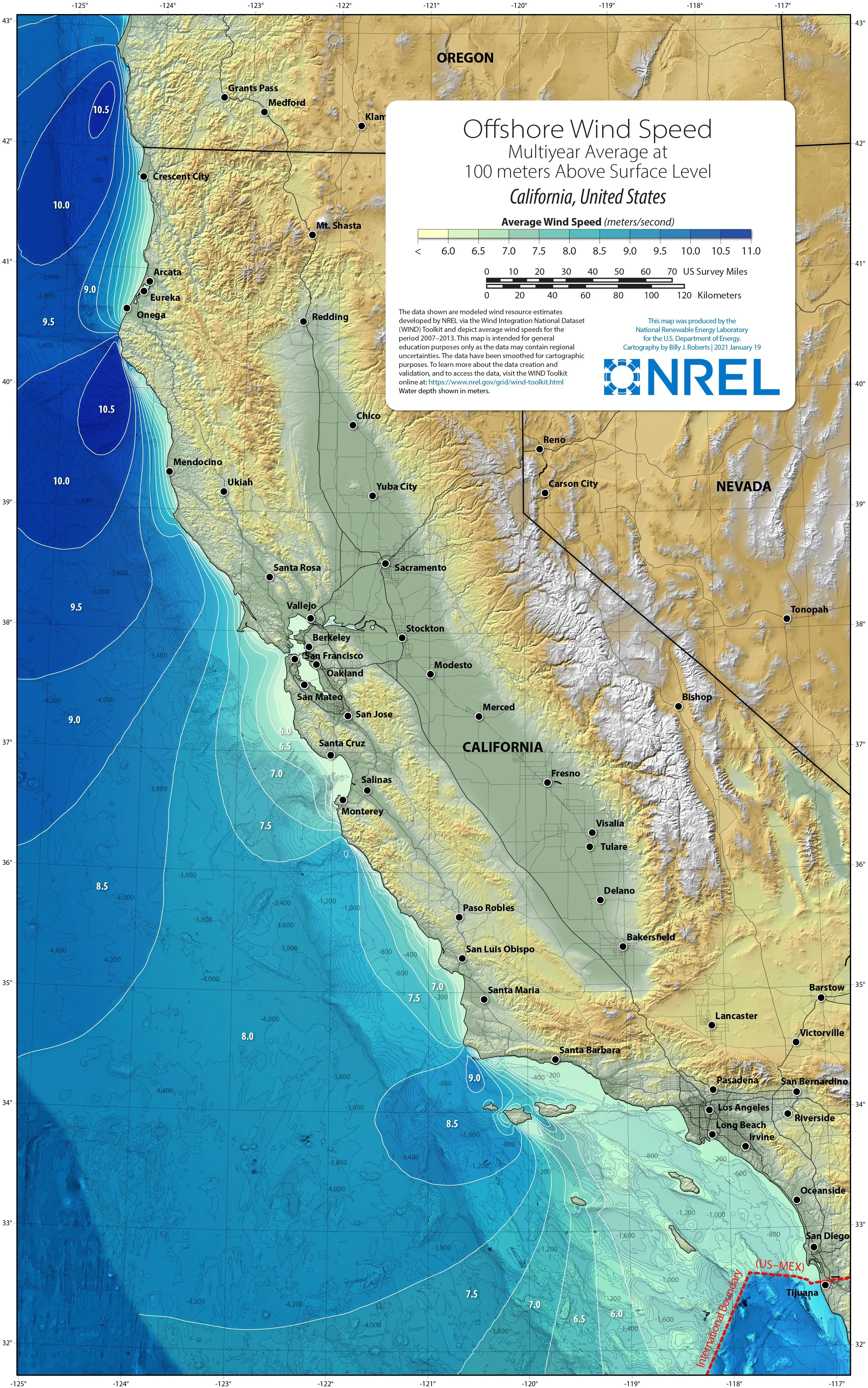
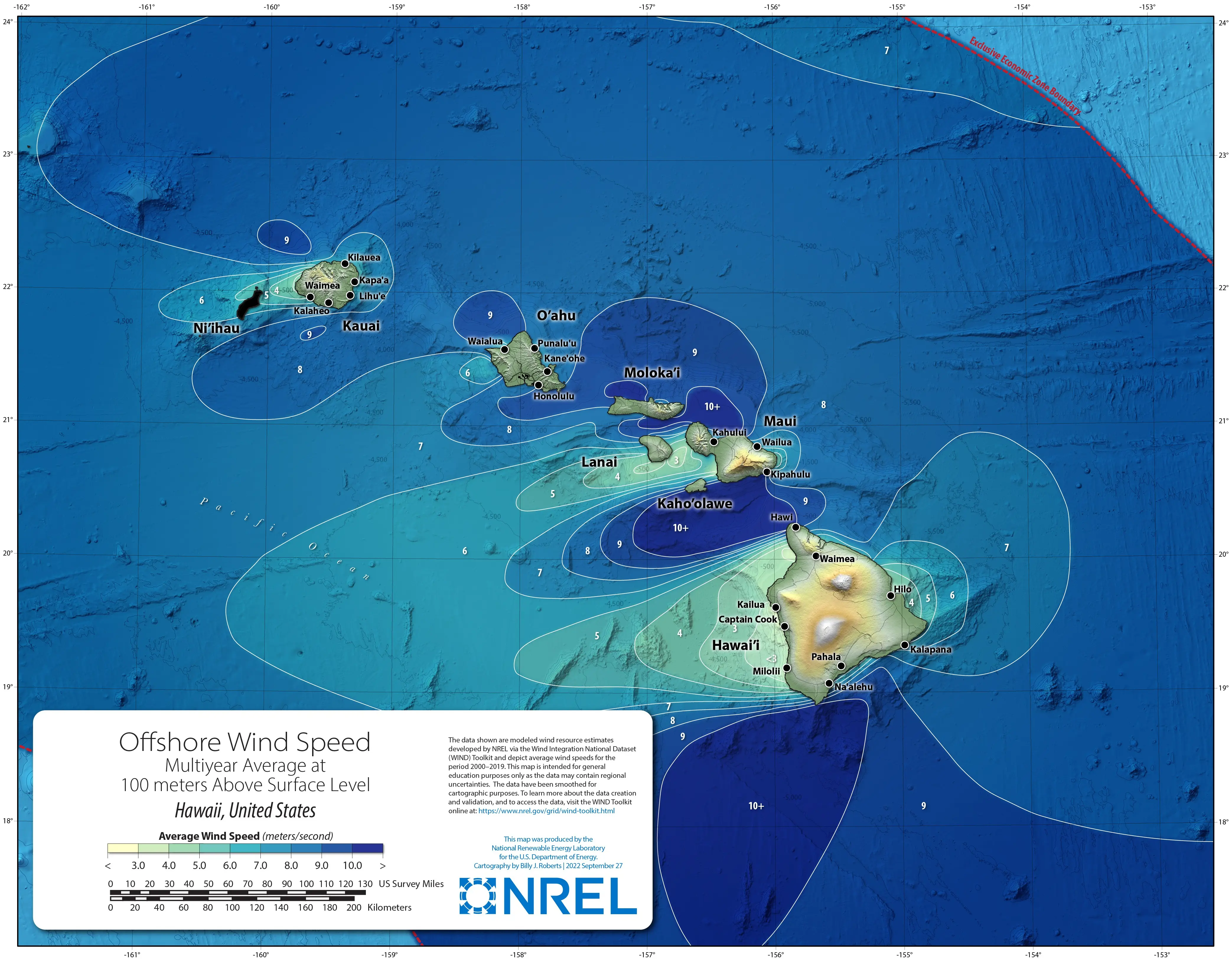

=== Gulf Coast ===
The NREL estimates that the Gulf of Mexico holds about 37% of the United States' total offshore wind potential. Oil and gas interests have already developed a transmission network that offshore wind could potentially use to assist its development; however, future transmission planning would still be required during rollout.

The total technical potential for offshore wind energy in the Gulf of Mexico likely has a capacity of over 1,500 GW. However, potential projects face environmental challenges from the Gulf's relatively lower wind speeds, extreme rainfall events and hurricanes, and softer and shallower seabed soil conditions that will likely favor jacket foundations over more common monopiles. Future projects will likely encounter infrastructure challenges, including complex transmission planning and points of interconnection in need of upgrades. The region's complex political environment and a lack of focused community and workforce engagement to integrate stakeholder feedback into project plans may also complicate planning efforts for future proposed wind farms.

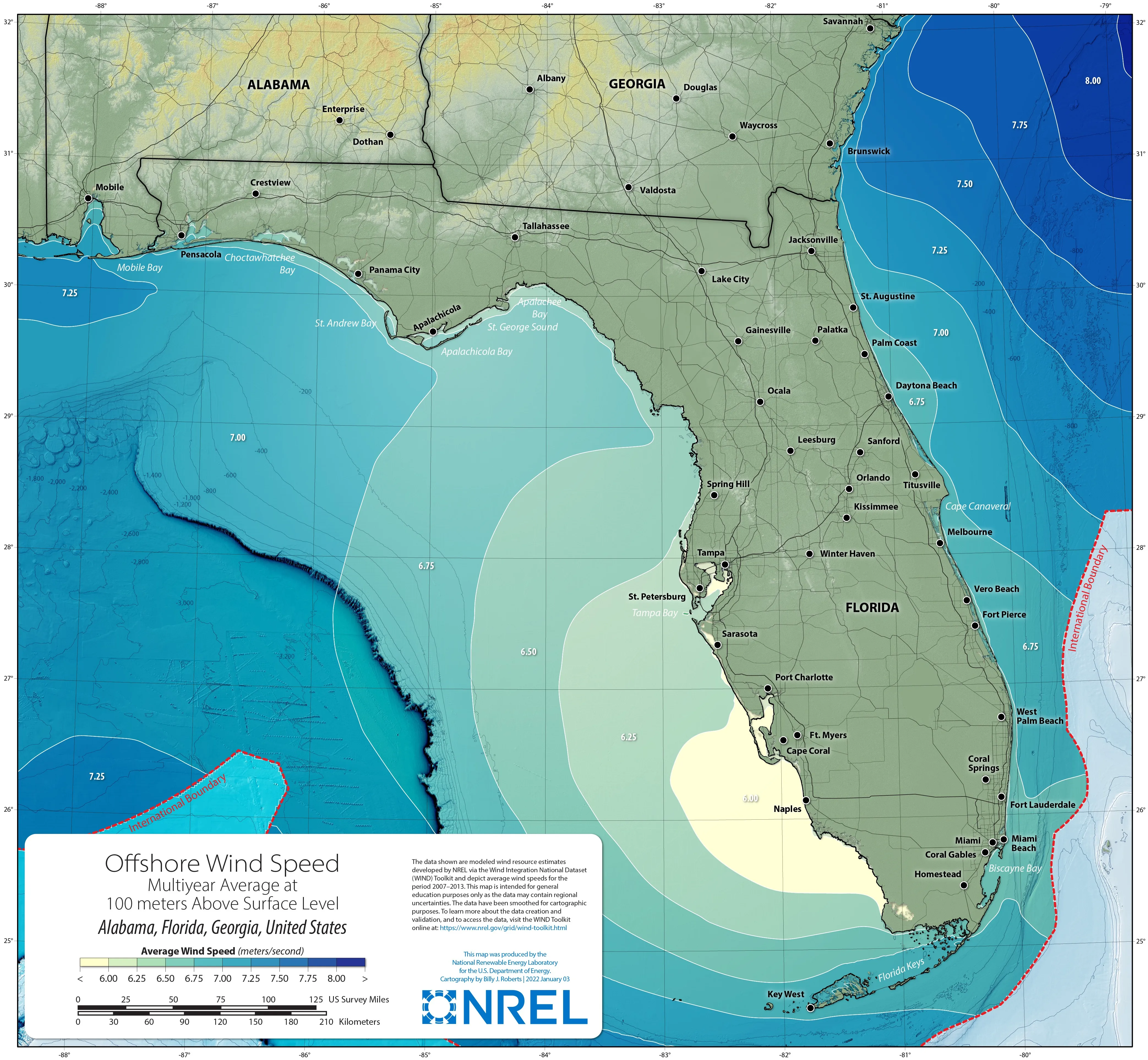
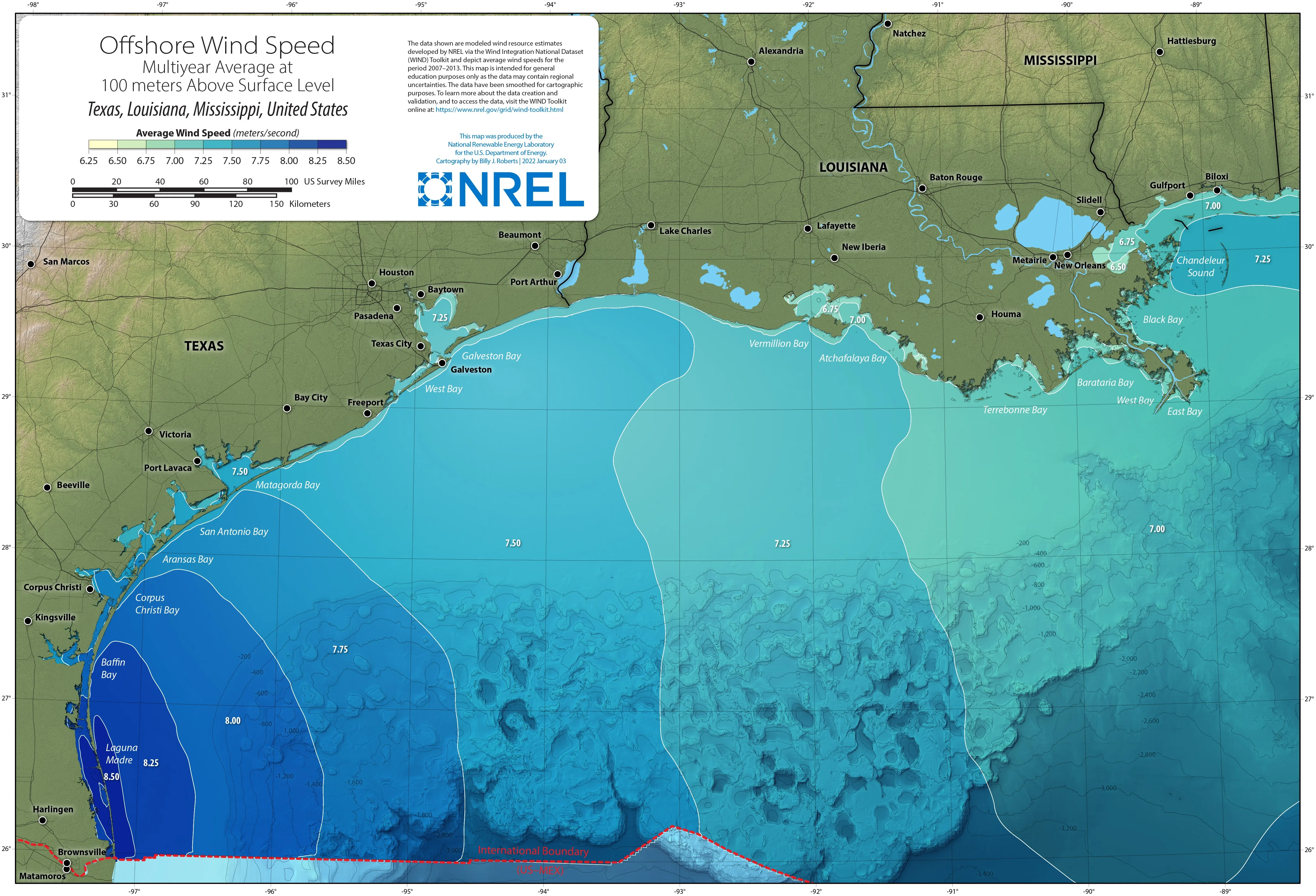

== Federal regulation and incentives ==
The Energy Policy Act of 2005 provided for tax credits and other incentives for production of wind power, authorizing the development of a regulatory framework for environmental reviews of proposed offshore wind projects. This framework allows for a process where:

The construction of an offshore wind farm involves a three-phase permitting process. First, the proponents must lease the seafloor from its owner – typically this will be Outer Continental Shelf, the federal seafloor which is leased by the BOEM under the Outer Continental Shelf Lands Act — but small wind projects can be constructed in state waters as well. The BOEM is the federal agency responsible for determining offshore areas where wind farms may be built in federal waters. It sells leases to qualified bidders. These leases may be awarded non-competitively, if only one proponent is interested in developing the area, or by auction. Once awarded, the lease areas can be further assigned and subdivided into separate projects.

Each project proponent, after winning an auction and making its initial lease payment, must file a Site Assessment Plan (SAP), which details the work required to evaluate the environmental conditions in the lease area, including both surface and seafloor conditions. After the SAP is approved, the proponent will install weather buoys and engage survey vessels to develop sufficiently detailed information to complete the design of the wind farm – this will include identifying protected species habitats, unexploded ordnance, shipwrecks, and geological formations that could interfere with either the foundations for wind turbines or the electrical cabling. After completing the survey, the proponent might choose to abandon the lease area if it appears development will be uneconomical, or else continue to final design and permitting, which culminates in the filing of a Construction and Operations Plan (COP).

In addition to the federal permitting process, all wind farms require state permits for their connections to the on-shore electric grid; even if an offshore project is constructed entirely in federal waters its "export cables" will need to transit state waters to reach the shore. Other permits may be required to connect to the grid, such as certificate of public necessity, as well as private consents from an integrated electric utility or a regional transmission organization.

=== Federal permitting process ===
During the federal permitting process, several U.S. federal agencies oversee different aspects of offshore wind development. The Bureau of Ocean Energy Management (BOEM) manages leasing and permitting on the Outer Continental Shelf, while the Federal Energy Regulatory Commission (FERC) regulates offshore transmission and grid interconnection. The National Oceanic and Atmospheric Administration (NOAA) provides environmental data and assesses marine ecosystem impacts. The U.S. Army Corps of Engineers (USACE) issues permits for waterway impacts, and the U.S. Fish and Wildlife Service (USFWS) evaluates effects on wildlife. The Environmental Protection Agency (EPA) enforces air and water quality regulations, and the Department of Energy (DOE) supports research and development. The U.S. Coast Guard (USCG) ensures navigation safety, while the Department of Defense (DoD) assesses potential conflicts with military operations.

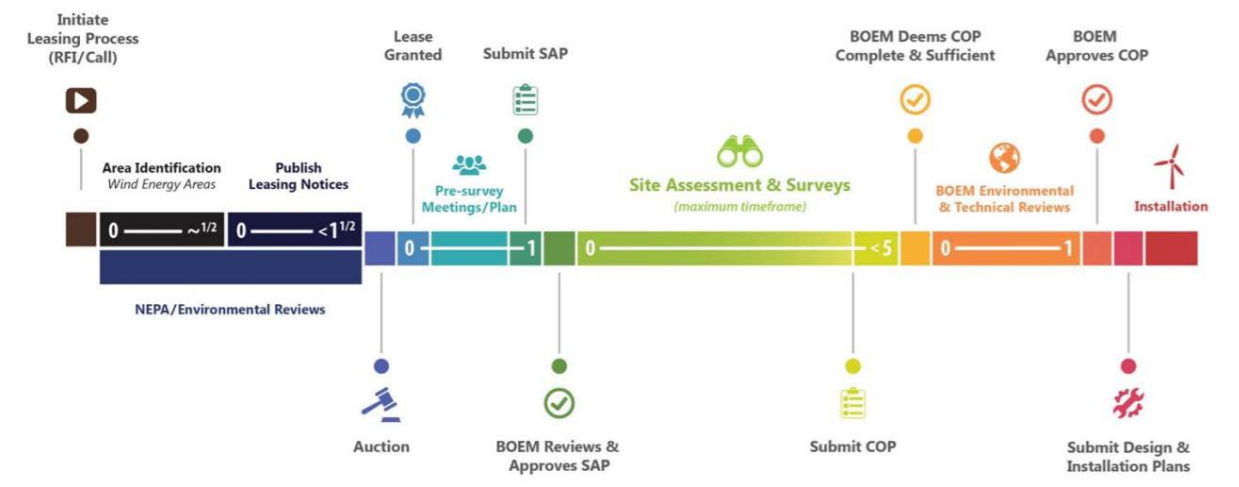
BOEM's outline for the federal offshore wind development process in the United States

The offshore wind development process consists of several phases, beginning with planning and analysis, where BOEM identifies potential wind energy areas and publishes sale notices, typically taking six months to 1.5 years. In the leasing phase, BOEM holds lease auctions and awards leases to developers. The site assessment and characterization phase follows, lasting up to five years, during which the lessee conducts studies and submits a Construction and Operations Plan (COP) for BOEM review. The COP review period takes approximately two years, during which BOEM evaluates the plan and conducts environmental (EIS) and technical reviews. In the construction phase, which lasts one to two years, the lessee submits facility design and fabrication reports to the Bureau of Safety and Environmental Enforcement (BSEE) and begins project development. The project then moves into the operations and maintenance phase, lasting up to 35 years, where BSEE ensures compliance with safety and environmental regulations. Finally, the decommissioning phase takes one to two years, during which BSEE oversees the removal of infrastructure.

=== Wind energy areas ===
In January 2012, a "Smart from the Start" regulatory approach was introduced, designed to expedite the siting process while incorporating strong environmental protections. Specifically, the Department of Interior approved "wind energy areas" off the coast where projects can move through the regulatory approval process more quickly. The NOAA Coastal Services Center (CSC) has released a cadastre web tool to illustrate suitability of Eastern seaboard areas.

In 2014, Secretary of the Interior Sally Jewell announced three new wind energy areas off the coast of North Carolina in accordance with the "Smart from the Start" approach, which totaled to around 307,590 acres of ocean. These three are the Kitty Hawk Wind Energy Areas (122,405 acres), the Wilmington West Wind Energy Areas (51,595 acres), and the Wilmington East Wind Energy Areas (133,590 acres). These locations were chosen through collaboration with the United States Coast Guard to ensure that these locations posed no risk to navigational safety while also protecting sensitive resources and habitats. Aside from these locations, wind energy areas are currently leased to developers along the East Coast, West Coast, and the Gulf of Mexico.

The U.S. offshore wind industry is advancing with the Eco Edison, the first U.S.-built vessel for maintaining offshore wind farms, christened in New Orleans with bipartisan political support. Constructed by Orsted AS and Eversource Energy to service projects in the Northeast, the Eco Edison symbolizes a significant investment in overcoming industry challenges such as inflation and supply chain disruptions.

=== National Environmental Policy Act ===
Like other major permitting actions, approval of the construction and operations plan is subject to the National Environmental Policy Act and requires preparation of an environmental impact statement (EIS). BOEM is the lead federal agency in the EIS process, coordinating input from other federal agencies including the Coast Guard, the Fish and Wildlife Service, the Maritime Administration, the National Park Service, and the Army Corps of Engineers. In addition to approving each individual project's COP, the BOEM also performs an environmental review prior to opening an area of seafloor to leasing, although this review is not as stringent as a full EIS. The initial review largely serves to identify areas which are not developable and thus should be excluded from leasing.

The full COP review considers impacts to protected marine ecosystems, commercial and recreational fishing, as well as historic and cultural resources. The Coast Guard and Federal Aviation Administration evaluate each wind farm's COP for hazards to navigation and interference with coastal surveillance radars.

=== Jones Act ===
The Merchant Marine Act of 1920 is a United States federal statute that provides for the promotion and maintenance of the American merchant marine. Section 27 of the Merchant Marine Act is known as the Jones Act and deals with cabotage (coastwise trade) and requires that all goods transported by water between U.S. ports be carried on U.S.-flag ships, constructed in the United States, owned by U.S. citizens and crewed by U.S. citizens and U.S. permanent residents.

The lack of ships of size needed to transport large equipment needed for wind turbines has slowed the develop of offshore wind farms. To comply with the Jones Act wind turbine installation vessels for $300 million could economically supply a schedule of 4 GW projects over 10 years. Two or three U.S. shipyards have the capacity to build such vessels. The Charybdis wind turbine installation vessel (WTIV) is under construction at Keppel AmFels Shipyard in Brownsville, Texas, scheduled for 2023.

=== Tax incentives ===
Current tax incentives for offshore wind are vital to the success of proposed projects. The upfront costs of building an offshore wind farm are extremely high. Tax incentives can help make these costs easier for developers to shoulder, and can ultimately lessen the burden on energy consumers by lower the price what is generated by the wind farm. These can come in the form of investment tax credits (ITCs) and production tax credits (PTCs).

In December 2020, Congress approved the Taxpayer Certainty and Disaster Tax Relief Act (TCDTRA), which modifies section 48 of the Internal Revenue Code that relates to tax liability for energy projects. This modification included a 30% investment tax credit for U.S. offshore wind farms beginning construction between 2017 and 2026.

The Inflation Reduction Act (IRA), enacted in August 2022, expanded the investment tax credit (ITC) by adding two ten percent stackable, or bonus, credits. One has a content-based requirement that twenty percent of the raw materials are mined, produced, or manufactured in the United States; however, the current US offshore wind supply chain might not be advanced enough for developers to easily meet this requirement. The other credit requires that the onshore facilities servicing offshore wind projects be sited in "energy communities" that are currently considered dependent on fossil fuels. Qualifying areas have at least 0.17% of total employment or 25% of revenues from the fossil fuel industry. The IRA also subsidized multiple stages of offshore wind development, such as the cost of mining required raw minerals and wind turbine installation vessels. To support efforts to develop a coordinated offshore wind transmission network, the IRA allocated $100 million to fund research, planning, and modeling in the Pacific.

The IRA extended a production tax credit (PTC) through 2024, and introduced manufacturing tax credits. However, initial uncertainty regarding qualification requirements delayed clarity for developers, and most projects have opted for the ITC over the PTC due to its greater financial benefit under current conditions.

To appease oil and gas interests, the IRA included a provision dictating that for ten years after the bill's passage, BOEM may not award a new offshore wind lease unless it has held offered sixty million acres for oil and gas leasing within a year of the wind auction.

=== MARAD grants ===
The United States Maritime Administration (MARAD) has made grants for various projects to re-fit or develop new offshore wind ports for the assembly and staging of turbines and other windfarm infrastructure.

== Wind ports and infrastructure ==
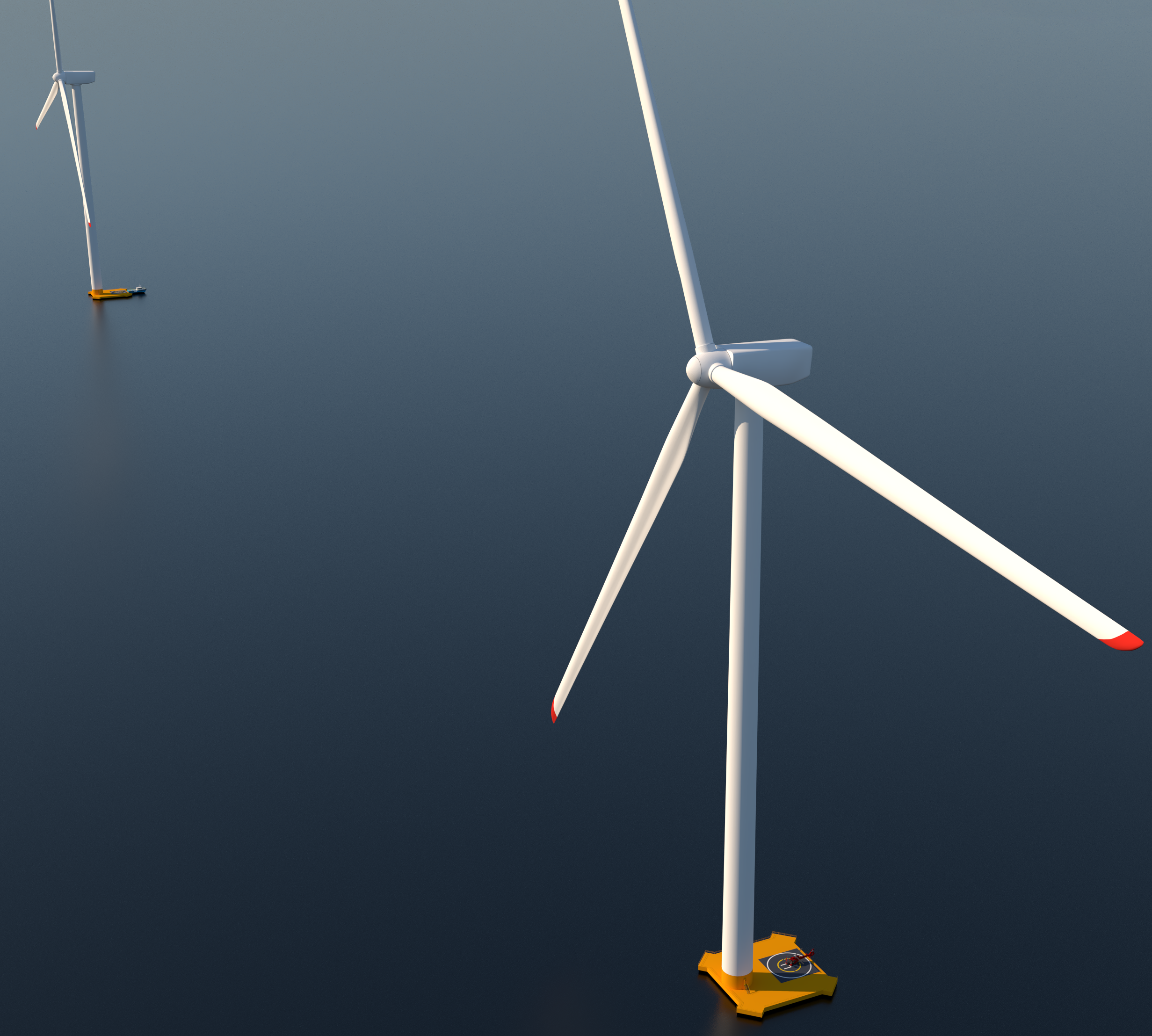
Offshore wind turbines

Several ports are building and converting facilities to handle the large components and manufacturing necessities, such as a blade factories. Some ports include the Portsmouth Marine Terminal (VA), Port of Baltimore (MD), New Jersey Wind Port, Port of Paulsboro (NJ), Arthur Kill Terminal (NY), South Brooklyn Marine Terminal (NY), Port of Albany–Rensselaer (NY), Bridgeport Harbor (CT), State Pier New London (CT) New Bedford Marine Commerce Terminal (MA), and Salem Harbor (MA). These ports and wind farms are concentrated in the Northeast region as the OCS has higher wind speeds than several other regions as well as shallower water levels, making construction for offshore wind turbines preferable.

The structure of an offshore wind turbine includes items such as monopiles, transition pieces, towers, nacelles, blades, hubs, and is preassembled whenever possible. Additionally, offshore substations are frequently used in order to compile all energy in one station from each turbine through an inter-array cable and then direct it onshore via one export cable. Once onshore, the cable landing process directs the energy to the onshore station, which is finally used to connect to the local electric grid.

== Public Opinion ==
Research shows that public support for wind power projects is necessary for their success. During the proposition of the Block Island Wind Farm (BIWF) off the coast of Rhode Island there were discussions led by managers and developers intended to build trust with the people who would be affected by this farm's creation. The project ensured transparency in their operations, considered the input from the public, and local communities that interacted with the part of the ocean that would be affected. This included hiring liaisons to interact on behalf of the parties they represented and push for plan changes to limit impacts on local communities.

Another study used surveys to determine the general public's views on renewable energy in the areas surrounding the BIWF. They found that in the sampled population of New England 93% of respondents supported renewables. When asked about the BIWF specifically the rate of support among seasonal and permanent residents of Block Island remained above 70%.

== Impacts ==
=== Socioeconomic ===
The expansion of offshore wind energy in the United States presents significant economic opportunities, particularly for coastal regions. According to the American Clean Power Association, offshore wind development is expected to generate 56,000 jobs by 2030, with additional indirect employment generated through supply chain growth and port infrastructure investments. In addition, in 2019, the University of Delaware and the Danish Energy and Climate Academy jointly opened the first US skills training program for offshore wind energy professionals. This development not only diversifies the national energy portfolio but also strengthens domestic manufacturing and maritime industries, fostering long-term economic growth in underserved coastal areas. Furthermore, offshore wind can help stabilize electricity prices by reducing reliance on imported fossil fuels and insulating markets from price volatility.

However, the industry also faces challenges related to potential conflicts with existing coastal communities affected by offshore wind projects. Coastal communities have raised objections regarding the impacts of turbines, which may affect tourism, shared heritage sites, and property values. However, some data suggest that tourism may actually increase, as the general public is interested in offshore wind. According to a study done on Block Island, 72% of visitors support the wind farm. Nevertheless, addressing these concerns requires proactive stakeholder engagement, comprehensive marine spatial planning, and the development of mitigation strategies.

Additionally, some communities are worried that offshore wind projects could disrupt fishing grounds and argue that the expansion of the industry in recent years has outpaced thorough environmental review and data collection. Local fishermen in Rhode Island and Massachusetts raised concerns over the Block Island and Vineyard Wind I projects negatively impacting ecosystems and threatening their livelihoods. For commercial fisheries, fuel expenditures account for up to 80% of at-sea operational costs, and the placement of wind farms could displace fishermen as they seek new fishing grounds, increasing fuel costs.

Beyond these immediate local conflicts, broader socioeconomic dynamics also shape opposition to offshore wind. Research has shown that opposition is not always purely grassroots but is often influenced by larger political and economic networks, including fossil fuel interests and conservative think tanks, which provide information subsidies to amplify concerns about offshore wind's economic and environmental impact. Furthermore, some coastal communities have expressed skepticism toward offshore wind projects due to concerns about whether they will receive direct economic benefits, such as local job creation or reduced electricity costs. Despite these challenges, offshore wind remains a key component of U.S. energy goals, offering substantial economic potential for coastal and national markets.

=== Environmental ===
Offshore wind energy development in the United States has both positive and negative environmental impacts. One of the primary environmental benefits is the reduction of greenhouse gas emissions by displacing fossil fuel-based energy sources. According to the Ocean Conservancy, the Biden Administration's goal of 30 GW of offshore energy by 2030 could reduce carbon emissions by up to 78 million metric tons annually and generate enough energy to power 10 million homes. Additionally, a study conducted in 2014 in Michigan analyzed the effects of offshore wind farms on the Great Lakes region and found improvement in local air quality. Results from this study indicated a decrease in all common air pollutants as a result of the development of offshore wind energy, as well as a projected 25% decrease in CO_{2} emissions by 2050.

There is also evidence that below the surface, offshore wind farms can provide positive environment effects. The covering used to protect the anchoring mechanisms have been shown to create habitats for marine life. Additionally, artificial reefs can be installed to mitigate damage to marine life resulting from turbine installation. Furthermore, depending on how fishing is managed near offshore wind turbines, wind farms could function similarly to marine protected areas, which could have tremendously positive impacts on the environment, protecting it from extractive activities and creating an artificial reef effect that could propagate up the food web, increasing local biodiversity and abundance. Because of the spillover effect, nearby regions may experience similar benefits. In 2018 a series of interviews collected the views of recreational anglers, tackle shops, and charter operators near the Block Island Wind Farm. The majority of the interviewees commented on an increase in marine life surrounding the turbines. They also noted an increase in the variety of fish species as a result of the changed environment.

Offshore wind development poses potential environmental risks. The construction and maintenance of these farms involve the potential to harm local marine life. Coastal bird species can be harmed by the development of offshore wind farms though studies suggest that the risk is lower compared to onshore wind farms. Concerns also center around offshore wind negatively impacting marine life, specifically the endangered North Atlantic right whale, due to possible vessel strikes and entanglement with fishing gear. According to a 2005 survey, 44% of people expected a negative impact on marine life when questioned about the proposed Cape Wind project. These concerns are often expressed by groups that are opposed to offshore wind development, who assert that offshore wind could bring about the extinction of the North Atlantic right whale.

Scientific studies have found no direct link between offshore wind activities and whale deaths. Turbine construction, particularly pile driving, generates underwater noise that can disturb marine mammals and fish. To mitigate these impacts, developers have implemented measures such as seasonal restrictions on pile driving to avoid sensitive breeding and migration periods, the use of bubble curtains to dampen underwater noise, and real-time monitoring of marine mammal activity to temporarily halt construction when animals are nearby. Additionally, adaptive management strategies, including dynamic fisheries management and habitat restoration initiatives, have been proposed to address concerns about potential disruptions to fish populations. Since the 2005 survey on the expected impacts on marine life, more information like this has been made available about the construction and operation of offshore wind turbines. When the survey was conducted again in 2009 the percentage of people who expected a negative impact dropped to 34%.

Another source of concern cited by those opposed to offshore wind is the possibility of pollution, especially when turbines break or are decommissioned. In July 2024, a blade from a GE Vernova turbine in the Vineyard Wind project off the coast of Nantucket fractured, sending large pieces of debris and smaller shards of fiberglass into the water. Less than a month later, another GE Vernova turbine blade failed in the United Kingdom. Still, the rate of blade failures is very low—3 blade failures (the two described plus one other incident) only represent 0.00004% of the 70,000 blades manufactured in 2024.

All projects are required to develop mitigation efforts, environmental assessments, and adaptive management strategies to minimize the negative impacts caused by project development.

== Experimental floating turbine projects ==
North America's first floating wind turbine, a project from the University of Maine, was the 20 kW Volturn US that was lowered into the Penobscot River in Maine in 2013. Residents of Searsport, Maine, near the potential site, have expressed resistance to placement near their community.

In May 2014, the United States Department of Energy chose an offshore wind project to receive funding. Principle Power was planning a 30-MW WindFloat project in 2013 using 6-MW Siemens turbines in 366 m of water near Coos Bay, Oregon to be operational in 2017, but the project was cancelled as it was deemed too costly. Interest has since been renewed.

As of 2020, the United States Department of Energy is funding two demonstration projects: University of Maine's Aqua Ventus I, which plans to use a semisubmersible floating concrete foundation design, and Lake Erie Energy Development Corporation's (LEEDCo's) 20 MW Icebreaker project

== See also ==
- List of offshore wind farms in the United States
- Wind power in the United States
- List of wind farms
- List of offshore wind farms
- Lists of offshore wind farms by country
- Energy Policy Act of 2005
