= A. James Barnes =

American attorney

6th Deputy Administrator of the United States Environmental Protection Agency
- In office May 10, 1985 – August 14, 1988
- President: Ronald Reagan
- Preceded by: Alvin L. Alm
- Succeeded by: F. Henry Habicht II

Personal details
- Born: August 30, 1942 (age 82); Napoleon, Ohio
- Political party: Republican

A. James Barnes (born August 30, 1942) is an American attorney who served in several senior management positions at the United States Environmental Protection Agency (EPA) and later as a dean and professor at Indiana University Bloomington (IU).

Barnes served as Chief of Staff to EPA Administrator William Ruckelshaus when the agency was created in 1970. In the 1980s he was appointed General Counsel and later Deputy Administrator at EPA from 1985 to 1988. He also worked at the United States Department of Agriculture and the United States Department of Justice. Barnes is a Fellow of the National Academy of Public Administration.

At IU Barnes was Dean of the O'Neill School of Public and Environmental Affairs from 1988 to 2000, and subsequently he has been a professor of Law and Professor of Public and Environmental Affairs.
