= Tom Sansonetti =

American lawyer (born 1949)

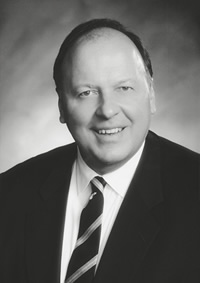

United States Assistant Attorney General for the Environment and Natural Resources Division
- In office December 2001 – April 8, 2005
- President: George W. Bush
- Preceded by: Lois J. Schiffer
- Succeeded by: Sue Ellen Wooldridge

Solicitor of the United States Department of the Interior
- In office June 1990 – January 1993
- President: George H. W. Bush
- Preceded by: Martin Lewis Allday
- Succeeded by: John D. Leshy

Chair of the Wyoming Republican Party
- In office 1983–1987
- Preceded by: Fred Schroeder
- Succeeded by: Mark Hughes

Personal details
- Born: Thomas Lawrence Sansonetti; May 18, 1949 (age 77) Hinsdale, Illinois, U.S.
- Party: Republican
- Spouse: Kristi Ann Todd
- Education: University of Virginia (BA, MBA); Washington and Lee University (JD)
- Profession: Lawyer

Thomas Lawrence Sansonetti (born May 18, 1949), is an attorney and a former government official from the U.S. state of Wyoming. He now resides in Greenwood Village, a suburb of Denver, Colorado.

After graduation from high school, he earned an M.B.A. from the University of Virginia in Charlottesville and his Juris Doctor from Washington and Lee University School of Law in Lexington, Virginia. From 1983 to 1987, Sansonetti served as Chair of the Wyoming Republican Party. In 1989, he became legislative director for newly elected U.S. Representative Craig L. Thomas, and shortly afterwards was chosen to be his chief of staff. In 1991, he became Solicitor of the U.S. Department of the Interior, where he served until 1993. He then joined the Cheyenne law firm of Holland and Hart, where he worked until being appointed Assistant U.S. Attorney General for the Environment and Natural Resources Division of the Justice Department. He is considered to be a strong conservative but has never held elective office.

Sansonetti received the most votes from the GOP central committee to succeed his former mentor, Senator Thomas, who died on June 4, 2007. He advanced as one of the state GOP's three party nominees for senator. Governor Dave Freudenthal appointed State Senator John Barrasso, an orthopedic surgeon from Casper.
