= Wind turbine installation vessel =

Type of vessel

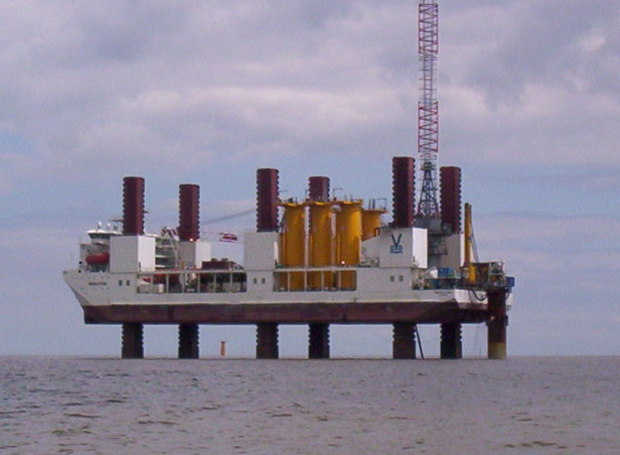
TIV MPI Resolution, the first WTIV

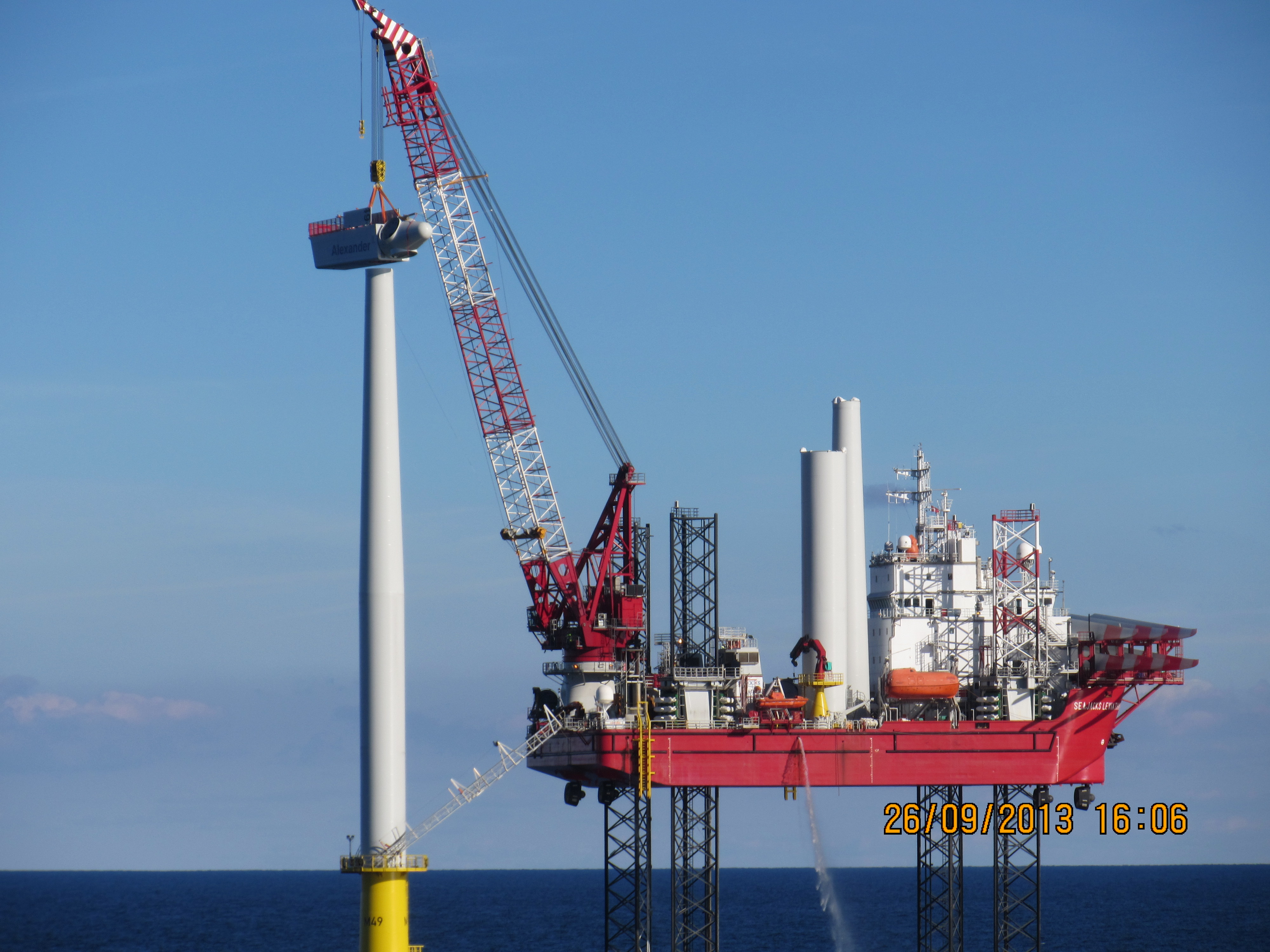
At Offshore Windpark Meerwind

A wind turbine installation vessel (WTIV) is a vessel specifically designed for the installation of offshore wind turbines. There were 16 such vessels in 2020.

Most are self-elevating jackup rigs. To enable quick relocation in the wind farm it is self-propelled. It also has a slender ship shaped hull to achieve a quick turnaround time with the vessel carrying several foundations or wind turbines each time. Azimuth thrusters are used to position the vessel during jack-up operations. Some vessels use the thrusters in dynamic positioning (without jacking up) to keep the vibrating pile driver steady when installing foundations. Some may carry five modern wind turbines and lift 700 tonnes 125 metres (410 ft) above deck.

A vessel can cost $335 million, or $220,000 per day. A 3-year leasing may cost €90 million.

The fleet of 16 vessels are scheduled to expand to 23 vessels by 2023, of which seven can handle the largest turbines. The fast growth of turbine size challenges even the largest vessels. In China, lack of suitable vessels are slowing the construction of offshore wind farms.

A supplement to crane-equipped WTIVs can be crane-less feeder vessels with motion compensation. Some WTIVs have a crane but no legs.

Projects include a 155 m (509 ft) crane height, and lift capacity of 1,600–3,000 tonnes.

Some WTIV use biodegradable hydraulic fluids to minimize ecosystem impact during leaks. In Korea, some vessels are approved for liquefied natural gas.

Construction of the four-legged US Jones Act-compliant Charybdis started at Keppel in Texas in late 2020, at a cost of 715 million dollars, scheduled for the 700 MW Revolution Wind in 2023 and the 924 MW Sunrise Wind in 2024. Such vessels require 500–800 MW of installation per year for five years to be economical. The Jones Act makes it much more difficult to install offshore wind, introducing complications of transferring parts between ships and raising costs.

== See also ==
- List of construction occupations
- Offshore wind port
- Ring crane
