= Kriss =

Kriss might refer to:

== People ==
- Kriss (surname)
- Kriss (given name)

== Organizations ==
- Korea Research Institute of Standards and Science
- KRISS, a U.S. firearms company, who developed the Vector and KARD; see List of firearms

== Other uses ==
- Modenas Kriss series, a series of motorcycles from Modenas

== See also ==
- Chris (disambiguation)
- Cris (disambiguation)
- Kris (disambiguation)
- Krish (disambiguation)
- Kriss Kross (disambiguation)
