= Kriss (given name) =

Kriss is a given name. People with that name include:

- Kriss Akabusi (born 1958), British athlete and broadcaster
- Kriss Brining (born 1993). British rugby league player
- Kriss Donald (1988–2004), UK murder victim
- Krišs Kārkliņš (born 1996), Latvian soccer player
- Kriss Sheridan (born 1989), Polish-American singer
- Kriss Turner, U.S. screenwriter

== See also ==
- Kriss (disambiguation)
- Kriss (surname)
- Kris (name)
- Chris (given name)
- Cris (given name)
- Christian (given name)
- Christine (given name)
- Christopher (given name)
