= Chris (disambiguation) =

Chris is a unisex given name.

Chris may also refer to:

- Chris (album), a 2018 album by Christine and the Queens
- Chris (song), a 2011 song by C418 off the album Minecraft – Volume Alpha
- "Chris" (Skins series 1), a 2007 episode of the British television series Skins
- "Chris" (Skins series 2), a 2008 episode of the British television series Skins
- Chris (sheep) (2010–2019), a Merino ram shorn of a record amount of wool in 2015

== See also ==
- Kris (name)
- Criss (name)
- Cris (disambiguation)
- Christopher (disambiguation)
- Christine (disambiguation)
