= Cris =

Cris is a familiar form of the names Christopher, Cristian, Chris and Cristina.

Cris may also refer to:

- Cris (given name)

== Places ==
- Criș, the Romanian name for the river Körös in Hungary
- Criș (Târnava Mare), a tributary of the Târnava Mare in Mureș County, Romania
- Criș, a village in Daneș Commune, Mureș County, Romania

== Other ==
- ETRAX CRIS, a microprocessor family from Axis Communications
- Current research information system
- Cristal (wine), or just Cris, a champagne often referenced in rap lyrics
- Centre for Railway Information Systems, for Indian railways
- European Parliament Special Committee on the Financial, Economic and Social Crisis
- Cannabinoid Research Initiative of Saskatchewan
- CrIS, Cross-track Infrared Sounder, one of the instruments aboard the Joint Polar Satellite System
- Central Registration and Identification Scheme (CRiS), the UK's national register of caravans

== See also ==
- Criss, a given name and surname
