= Lisa Monaco =

American attorney (born 1968)

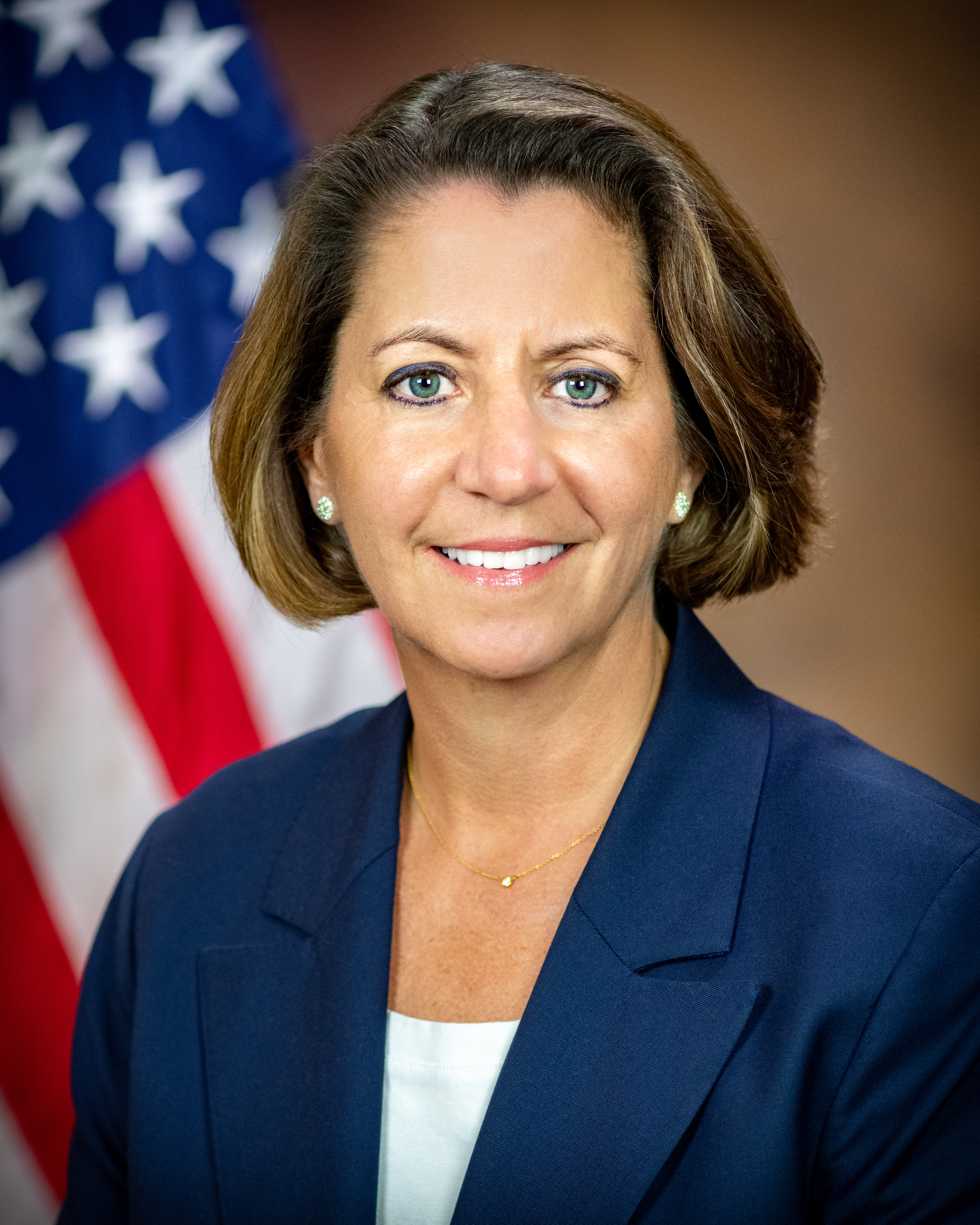
- Official portrait, 2023

Acting United States Attorney General
- In office January 20, 2025
- President: Donald Trump
- Deputy: Emil Bove (acting)
- Preceded by: Merrick Garland
- Succeeded by: Gary M. Restaino (acting)

39th United States Deputy Attorney General
- In office April 21, 2021 – January 20, 2025
- President: Joe Biden
- Attorney General: Merrick Garland
- Preceded by: Jeffrey A. Rosen
- Succeeded by: Todd Blanche

6th United States Homeland Security Advisor
- In office March 8, 2013 – January 20, 2017
- President: Barack Obama
- Preceded by: John O. Brennan
- Succeeded by: Tom Bossert

United States Assistant Attorney General for the National Security Division
- In office July 1, 2011 – March 8, 2013
- President: Barack Obama
- Attorney General: Eric Holder
- Preceded by: David S. Kris
- Succeeded by: John P. Carlin

Personal details
- Born: Lisa Oudens Monaco; February 25, 1968 (age 58) Boston, Massachusetts, U.S.
- Party: Democratic
- Education: Harvard University (BA); University of Chicago (JD)

Lisa Oudens Monaco (born February 25, 1968) is an American attorney who served as the 39th United States deputy attorney general from 2021 to 2025. She is a member of the Democratic Party.

Monaco previously served as homeland security advisor under President Barack Obama from 2013 to 2017. In this role, she served as the chief counterterrorism advisor to the president and was a statutory member of the U.S. Homeland Security Council. Prior to this, Monaco served as associate deputy Attorney General from 2009 to 2011 and assistant attorney general for the National Security Division from 2011 to 2013. Monaco also served as acting United States Attorney General in her capacity as United States Deputy Attorney General for a couple of hours following the resignation of Merrick Garland at noon on January 20, 2025, pursuant to 28 U.S.C. § 508, until her own resignation a few hours later, with Gary M. Restaino then serving as acting Attorney General in his capacity as United States Attorney for the District of Arizona, pursuant to Executive Order 14136 titled "Providing an Order of Succession Within the Department of Justice" that was signed by President Joe Biden on January 3, 2025 and published in the Federal Register on January 13, 2025, for a few hours until President Donald Trump signed an executive order naming DOJ Chief Administrative Hearing Officer James McHenry as acting United States Attorney General later in the day on January 20, 2025.

== Early life and education ==
Monaco was born in Boston, to parents Mary Lou (Oudens) and Anthony Monaco, and was raised in Newton, Massachusetts. She comes from an Italian-American family from Biccari, in the Southern Italian region of Apulia. Monaco graduated from the Winsor School in Boston in 1986. Monaco attended Harvard University, graduating with a Bachelor of Arts, magna cum laude, in American history and literature in 1990.

After earning her bachelor's degree, she worked as a research associate for The Wilson Quarterly at the Woodrow Wilson International Center for Scholars from 1990 to 1991, and as a senior associate for the Health Care Advisory Board, a healthcare advisory group, from 1991 to 1992. She was a research coordinator for the United States Senate Committee on the Judiciary, where she worked on the Violence Against Women Act, from 1992 to 1994 under then-chairman Joe Biden.

Monaco enrolled at the University of Chicago Law School, working as an intern in the White House Counsel's Office in 1996 before earning her J.D. degree in 1997. Monaco was also a summer associate for the law firm Hogan and Hartson, LLP. During her time at the University of Chicago, she spent summers working in Washington, D.C. as an intern on the D.C. Superior Court and as an intern for the United States Department of Justice in 1995. Additionally, Monaco served as the editor-in-chief of the University of Chicago Law School Roundtable, a legal journal.

Following graduation from law school, she joined the New York State Bar Association in 1998. From 1997 to 1998, Monaco worked as a law clerk for Judge Jane Richards Roth on the United States Court of Appeals for the Third Circuit, before she went on to work as counsel to then U.S. Attorney General Janet Reno from 1998 to 2001.

== Legal career ==
=== U.S. attorney ===
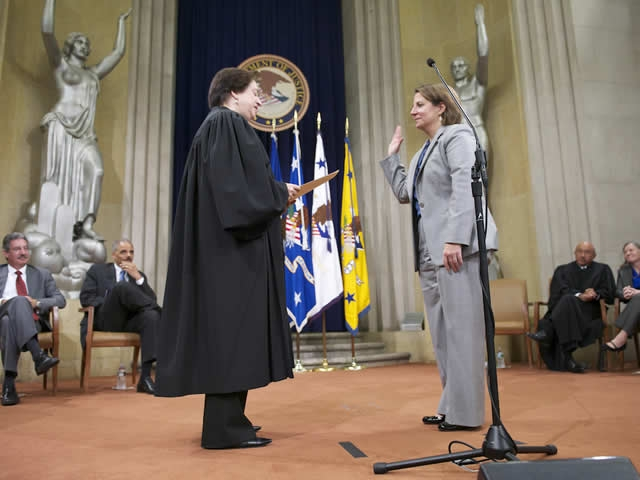
Monaco is sworn in as assistant attorney general for national security by Justice Elena Kagan in 2011.

From 2001 to 2007, she was an assistant U.S. attorney in the United States Attorney's office for the District of Columbia, and was appointed as a member of the Justice Department's Enron Task Force, co-leading the trial team in the prosecution of five former Enron executives from 2004 to 2006. Monaco received Department of Justice Awards for Special Achievement in 2002, 2003 and 2005.

She received the Attorney General's Award for Exceptional Service for her work on the Enron Task Force, the department's highest award. After the end of the Enron trial and the Justice Department's disbandment of the special task force, Monaco worked as a special counselor to FBI Director Robert Mueller. She was later chosen by Mueller to be his deputy chief of staff and then his chief of staff, a position she held until January 2009.

=== DOJ National Security Division ===
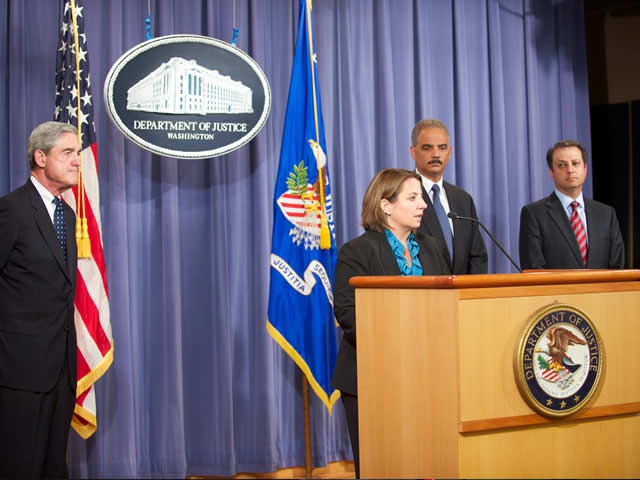
Monaco announces information related to charges for the 2011 alleged Iran assassination plot.

In January 2009, Monaco was appointed by United States Deputy Attorney General David W. Ogden to serve as associate deputy attorney general focusing on national security issues. She later served as principal associate deputy attorney general, the top aide to the deputy attorney general, from February 2010 to June 2011, in an acting capacity until January 2011.

On July 1, 2011, Monaco took office as assistant attorney general for national security following her appointment by President Barack Obama, leading the Justice Department division which oversees major counterterrorism and espionage cases, as well as authorizes the use of FISA warrants. In that role, she oversaw the investigation of Mansour Arbabsiar for a plot directed by the Iranian Islamic Revolutionary Guard Corps to kill the Saudi Ambassador to the U.S. She also made combatting cyber threats a top priority during her tenure, creating the first ever network of national security cyber specialist prosecutors from across the country. Monaco has been involved in meetings and attempts to close down the Guantanamo Bay detention camp.

== Homeland security and counterterrorism advisor (2013–2017) ==
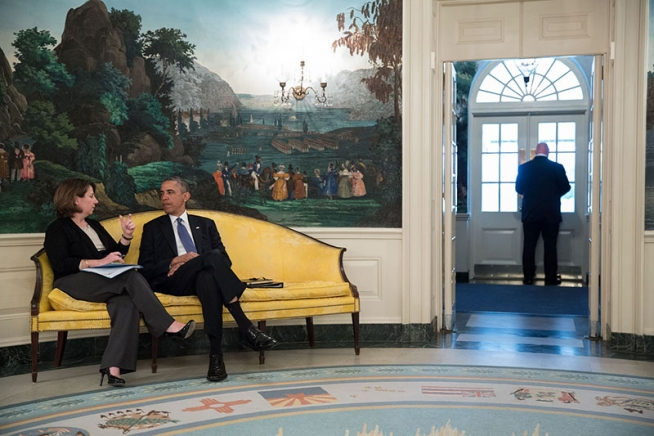
Monaco briefs President Barack Obama on the investigation of the Boston Marathon bombing in the Diplomatic Reception Room before the President departed the White House, April 18, 2013.

On January 25, 2013, President Barack Obama announced he would name Monaco to be his assistant to the president for homeland security and counterterrorism, the chief counterterrorism advisor to the President. Monaco succeeded John Brennan, who was nominated by Obama to become the director of the Central Intelligence Agency. Monaco took office on March 8, 2013, and became a statutory member of the United States Homeland Security Council.

In this role, Monaco led U.S. policy to disrupt terrorist threats against the United States, including degrading Al-Qaeda and affiliates from Al-Qaeda in the Arabian Peninsula to Jabhat Fateh al-Sham, putting the Islamic State of Iraq and the Levant on a lasting path to defeat, and building partner capacity to prevent and disrupt terrorist threats. She also led initiatives to expand collaboration with the private sector to counter ISIL's messaging and abuse of online platforms while lifting up alternative narratives. Separately, she led a comprehensive hostage policy reform effort from 2014 to 2015 to better align and coordinate U.S. government efforts and better serve affected families.

Monaco, alongside James Comey, was considered a frontrunner to succeed Robert Mueller as FBI Director in 2013. Monaco would have been the first woman to serve as Director if she had been chosen; ultimately, Comey was nominated and confirmed as Director.

On May 23, 2013, Daniel Klaidman, writing for the Daily Beast reported a White House official confirmed Monaco would handle "day-to-day responsibilities" for Guantanamo. In late July 2014, Monaco answered a question as to whether the mandate to keep Guantanamo open would end when U.S. troops had effectively retired from Guantanamo. Scholars at Lawfare interpreted Monaco's comment as a sign that the Obama presidency would ask the United States Congress to pass legislation enabling Guantanamo to remain open after U.S. involvement in the Afghan war ended. In February 2016, the White House and Department of Defense presented a comprehensive plan to Congress to close the detention facility at Guantanamo Bay.

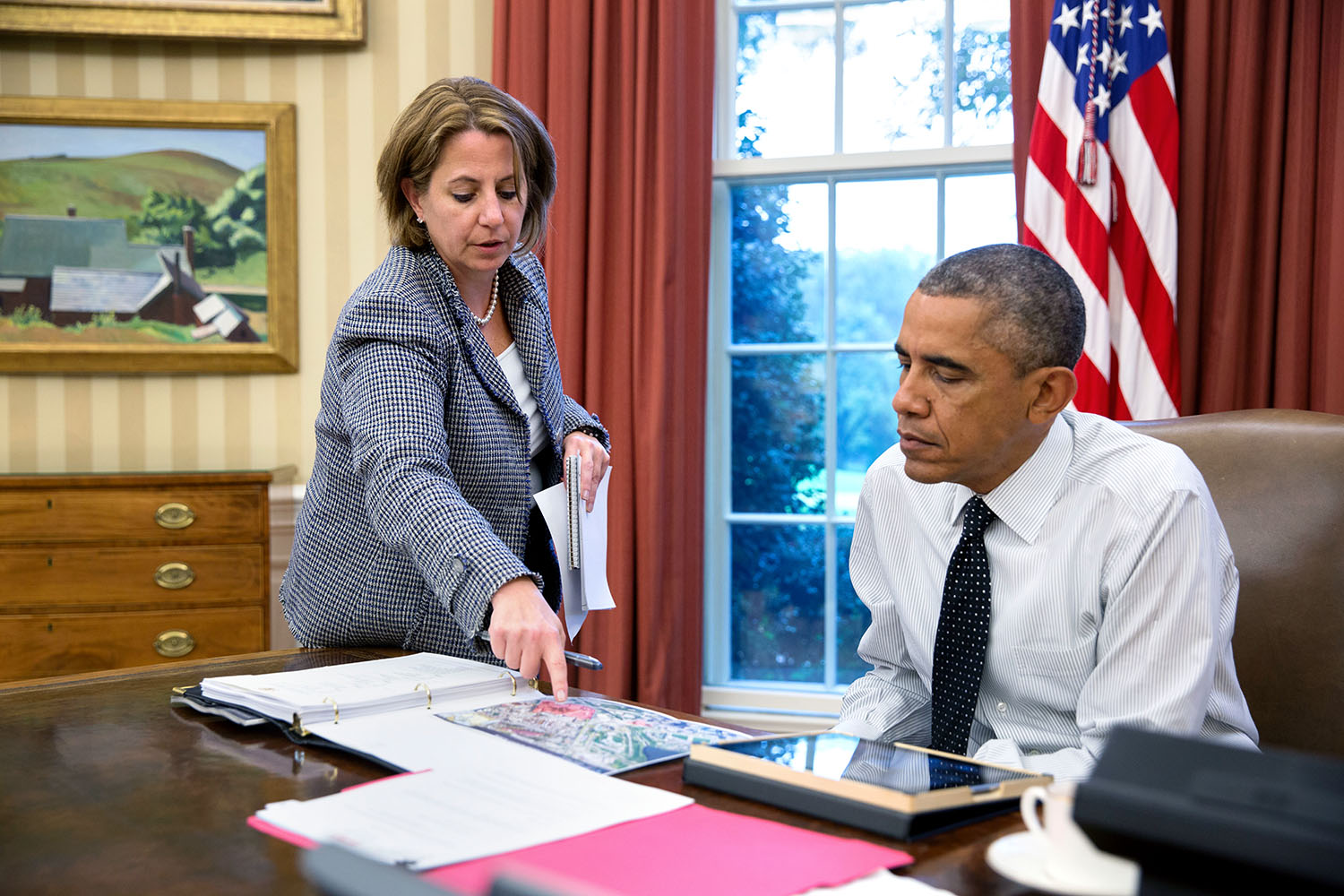
Monaco briefs President Obama, October 2014.

In the Homeland Security Advisor role, Monaco was also President Obama's chief cybersecurity advisor. She drove the policy decision to create the Cyber Threat Intelligence Integration Center in the Office of the Director of National Intelligence in 2015, to provide integrated all-source analysis of intelligence on foreign cyber threats and incidents affecting U.S. national interests similar to the National Counterterrorism Center on terrorist threats. She also helped develop the Cybersecurity National Action Plan, which was released in February 2016, to guide the actions the U.S. government took over the remaining duration of the Obama administration and to put in place a long-term cybersecurity strategy, both within the federal government and across the country. In July 2016, Monaco gave remarks at the International Conference on Cyber Security, outlining the Obama administration's cyber policy and announcing its new directive laying out how the federal government responds to significant cyber incidents.

Finally, over her tenure as President Obama's chief homeland security advisor, Monaco managed the United States response to Ebola and coordinated whole-of-government preparedness efforts to prevent its spread in the United States. In January 2017, Monaco led the Principal-Level Exercise, convening outgoing and incoming Principals across the U.S. government to share lessons learned during prior crises and discuss best practices in preparing for future crises.

== Private career post-Obama administration ==
In 2017, Monaco joined CNN as a national security analyst. In 2019, Monaco joined international law firm O'Melveny & Myers as a partner, where she co-chaired the firm's Data Security and Privacy group. During her time at O'Melveny & Myers, Monaco advised high-profile clients including ExxonMobil, Apple Inc., in addition to her alma mater, Harvard University. She also taught at NYU Law School and was a Fellow at the Reiss Center on Law and Security as well as the Belfer Center at Harvard's Kennedy School.

Monaco co-authored a piece in 2018 with public health expert Vin Gupta in Foreign Policy titled "The Next Pandemic Will Be Arriving Shortly", where she urged the U.S. government to prepare for the possibility of a future pandemic.

== Deputy attorney general (2021–2025) ==
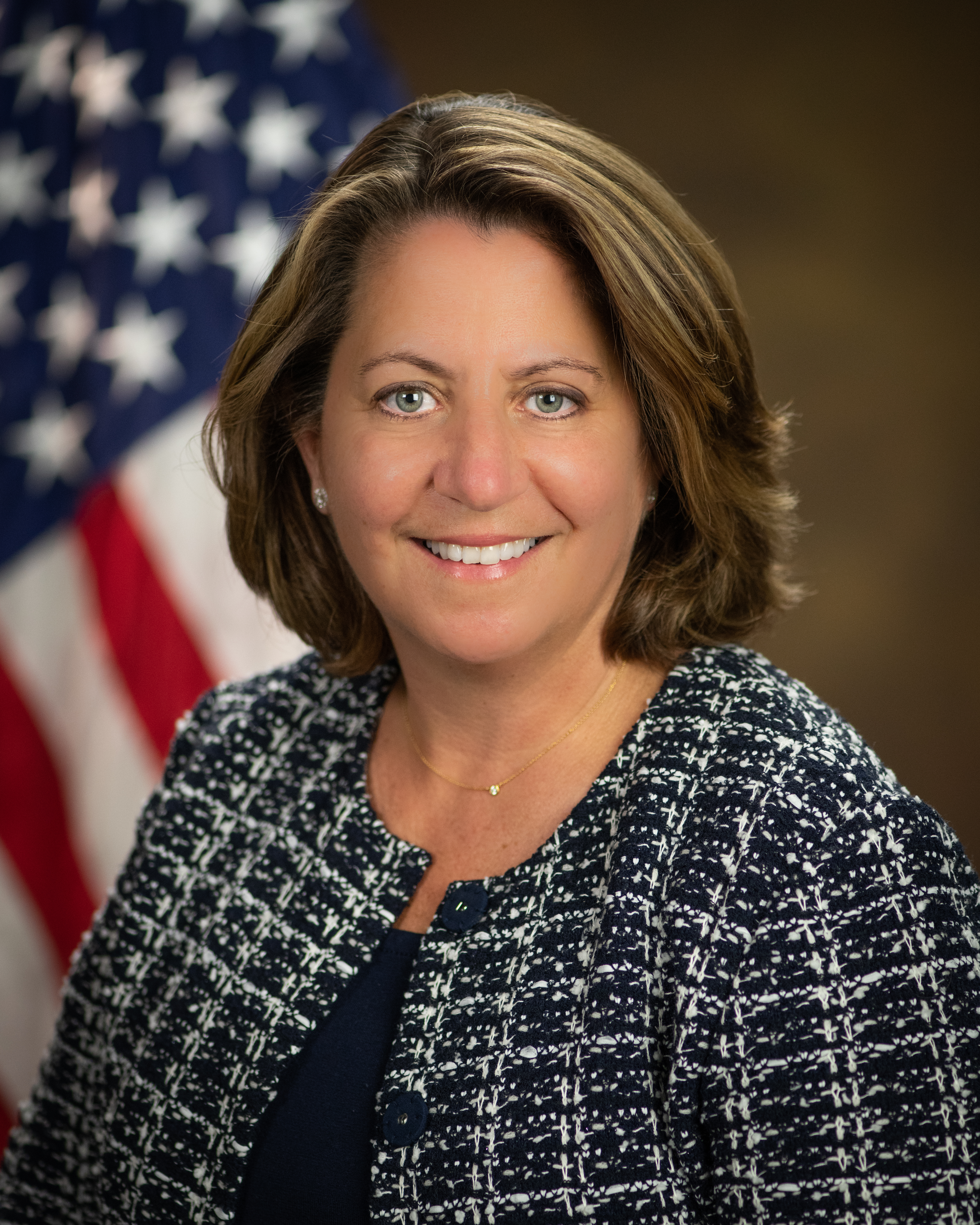
Monaco's first official portrait as Deputy Attorney General, 2021

=== Nomination ===
In April 2020, it was announced that Monaco would assist with vetting efforts for the selection of Joe Biden's running mate in the 2020 presidential election. Following Biden's election, Monaco was considered for several positions in the upcoming administration, including Attorney General.

On January 6, 2021, Monaco was nominated to serve as Deputy Attorney General, the second most powerful position in the Department of Justice (DOJ). Her nomination was endorsed by Senator Dick Durbin, who described her as "arguably the most qualified individual ever nominated to this position".

A hearing on her nomination before the Senate Judiciary Committee was held on March 9, 2021, and she was confirmed by the Senate on April 20, 2021. She was sworn in the next day. A coalition of progressive groups wrote in opposition to her nomination, arguing that Monaco's professional ties with Apple, currently under investigation by the DOJ, constituted a conflict of interest.

=== Tenure ===
As Deputy Attorney General, Monaco referred an investigation into the Trump administration's subpoena of Apple to the Office of the Inspector General. According to The Washington Post, Attorney General Merrick Garland had "tasked his deputy attorney general, Lisa Monaco, with “surfacing potentially problematic matters deserving high level review" since she took office.

==== Arctic Frost investigation ====
In April 2022, Monaco recommended that Attorney General Merrick Garland approve the opening of "Arctic Frost," a sensitive investigative matter examining alleged efforts to submit false electoral certificates following the 2020 presidential election. FBI Director Christopher A. Wray signed a memo dated April 4, 2022, requesting authorization, and Monaco added a handwritten note stating "Merrick — I recommend you approve." Garland approved the investigation the following day.

==== Safe Harbor Rules ====
In 2023, Monaco announced that the DOJ would implement safe harbor rules for certain mergers and acquisitions (M&A) activity. Under the safe harbor rules, the DOJ will not target corporations that disclose wrongdoing they find by businesses they are acquiring. The policy is reportedly intended to encourage more self-disclosure among businesses engaging in M&A activity.

==== Cybersecurity ====
In a 2021 interview with the Associated Press, Monaco stated that cybersecurity matters, including combating ransomware software and other cybercrime, would be a priority of the DOJ. In an October 2021 op-ed for CNBC, Monaco encouraged Congress to pass cybersecurity legislation that would standardize the reporting of breaches.

In a 2023 interview with The Washington Post, Monaco said that disrupting hackers was key to combating ransomware attacks. At an RSA security conference in 2023, Monaco touted the federal government's disruption of around $130 million in ransomware payments to what she called a "“top-five” ransomware network".

== Private career during the Trump administration ==
In May 2025, Monaco became Microsoft's head of global affairs. In September 2025, she became the target of public attacks from President Trump, who called on Truth Social for Microsoft to fire her.

Political offices
Preceded by David S. Kris	United States Assistant Attorney General for the National Security Division; 2011–2013	Succeeded by John P. Carlin
Preceded by John O. Brennan	United States Homeland Security Advisor; 2013–2017	Succeeded by Tom Bossert
Preceded by Jeffrey A. Rosen	United States Deputy Attorney General; 2021–2025	Succeeded by Todd Blanche
Preceded by Merrick Garland	United States Attorney General; Acting; 2025	Succeeded by Gary M. Restaino; Acting
