= Abuse of power =

Unlawful use of powers in an official capacity

Abuse of power or abuse of authority, in the form of "malfeasance in office" or "official abuse of power", is the commission of an unlawful act, done in an official capacity, which affects the performance of official duties. Malfeasance in office is often a just cause for removal of an elected official by statute or recall election.

In the United States, abuse of power has been cited in the impeachment of at least five federal officials. Two of these (Judge George English and President Richard Nixon) resigned before their trial in the Senate could take place, and two others were acquitted by the Senate. The first impeachment trial of President Donald Trump concluded with the president being found not guilty on both articles of impeachment with one of them being the charge of abuse of power. At the state level, Governor Rod Blagojevich of Illinois was impeached and unanimously removed from office by the Illinois Senate in 2009 for offenses including abuse of power.

== Institutional abuse ==
Institutional abuse is the maltreatment of someone (often children or older adults) by a system of power. This can range from acts similar to home-based child abuse, such as neglect, physical and sexual abuse, to the effects of assistance programs working below acceptable service standards, or relying on harsh or unfair ways to modify behavior.

== Impeachment of U.S. officials ==
=== James Peck ===
Federal Judge James H. Peck was impeached by the U.S. House of Representatives in 1830 on a charge of abuse of power. Peck had jailed a man for contempt of court after the man had publicly criticized him. The U.S. Senate acquitted him in 1831, with 21 voting guilty and 22 voting not guilty.

=== Charles Swayne ===
Federal Judge Charles Swayne was impeached by the U.S. House of Representatives in 1904. He was accused of filing false travel vouchers, improper use of private railroad cars, unlawfully imprisoning two attorneys for contempt, and living outside of his district. He was acquitted by the U.S. Senate in 1905. There was little doubt that Swayne was guilty of some of the offenses charged against him. Indeed, his counsel admitted as much, though calling the lapses "inadvertent". The Senate, however, refused to convict Swayne because its members did not believe his actions amounted to "high crimes and misdemeanors".

=== George English ===
Federal Judge George W. English was impeached by the U.S. House of Representatives in 1926, but resigned before his trial in the U.S. Senate could take place. One of the five articles of impeachment alleged "tyranny and oppression, and abuse of the powers of his office." The House voted to impeach by a vote of 306 to 60, but the charges were dismissed following English's resignation. He had been accused of abusive treatment of attorneys and litigants appearing before him.

=== Richard Nixon ===
President Richard Nixon resigned from office after the House Judiciary Committee voted to approve articles of impeachment, but before the full House had a chance to vote on impeachment. Of the three articles of impeachment, Article II charged Nixon with abuse of power, alleging in part that:

Using the powers of the office of President of the United States, Richard M. Nixon, in violation of his constitutional oath faithfully to execute the office of President of the United States and, to the best of his ability, preserve, protect, and defend the Constitution of the United States, and in disregard of his constitutional duty to take care that the laws be faithfully executed, has repeatedly engaged in conduct violating the constitutional rights of citizens, impairing the due and proper administration of justice and the conduct of lawful inquiries, or contravening the laws governing agencies of the executive branch and the purposes of these agencies.

The article also cited five specific examples of alleged misconduct to substantiate this charge against the president.

The vote on Article II was bipartisan, with 7 of the 17 Republicans joining all 21 Democrats on the committee in approving impeachment of a U.S. president for abuse of power.

=== Rod Blagojevich ===
Rod Blagojevich was impeached and removed from office as Governor of Illinois in 2009, on charges of abuse of power and corruption. Blagojevich was accused of several "pay to play" schemes, including attempting "to obtain personal gain ... through the corrupt use" of his authority to fill a vacant seat in the U.S. Senate. The Illinois House of Representatives voted 114–1 (with three abstentions) to impeach Blagojevich for abuse of power, and the Illinois Senate voted 59–0 to remove him from office.

=== Donald Trump ===
President Donald Trump was impeached by the U.S. House of Representatives on December 18, 2019. The votes for the charge of abuse of power in the House were 230 in favor, 197 against, and 1 present. Voting in favor were all but three House Democrats and one Independent, and voting against were all House Republicans and two Democrats; representative Tulsi Gabbard voted present. During his trial in the Senate on February 5, 2020, he was found not guilty. The votes for acquittal on the charge of abuse of power in the Senate were 48 against (45 Democratic senators, 2 Independent senators, one Republican senator), and 52 in favor (All Republicans). Of the two articles of impeachment, Article I alleges abuse of power.

== Other examples ==
=== Lois Lerner/IRS ===
In October 2017, the Trump Administration agreed to settle a lawsuit filed on behalf of more than four hundred conservative nonprofit groups. These nonprofit groups claimed that they had been discriminated against by the Internal Revenue Service for an undisclosed amount. This amount was described by the plaintiffs' counsel as "very substantial." The Trump Administration also agreed to settle a second lawsuit brought by forty-one conservative organizations with an apology and an admission that subjecting them to "heightened scrutiny and inordinate delays" was wrongful.

These acts by Lois Lerner were performed between 2010 and 2012 as a way to try to deal with the massive number of applications from organizations that were wanting a tax-exemption status. Many of these organizations that were seeking the tax-exemption status did not agree with how the government was being run and had 'tea party' or 'patriots' in their name.

=== Joe Arpaio ===
In February 2010, Judge John Leonardo found that Arpaio "misused the power of his office to target members of the Board of Supervisors for criminal investigation".

In 2008, a federal grand jury began an inquiry of Arpaio for abuse of power, in connection with a Federal Bureau of Investigation investigation. On August 31, 2012, the US Attorney's office of Arizona announced that it was "closing its investigation into allegations of criminal conduct" by Arpaio, without filing charges.

Arpaio was investigated for politically motivated and "bogus" prosecutions, which a former US Attorney called "utterly unacceptable". Phoenix Mayor Phil Gordon has called Arpaio's "long list" of questionable prosecutions "a reign of terror".

=== Police officers ===
Individual officers, or sometimes whole units, can be corrupt or carry out various forms of police misconduct; this occasionally happens in many forces, but can be more common where police pay is very low unless supplemented by bribes. Police officers sometimes act with unwarranted brutality when they overreact to confrontational situations, or to extract a confession from a person that they may or may not genuinely suspect of being guilty. Research released in October 2021 shows that from 1980 to 2018 there was an estimated 30,800 deaths due to police violence. That same study indicated that the National Vital Statistics System has misclassified/underreported over 55% of the estimated police-related deaths in the US.

=== Elliott Broidy ===
Elliott Broidy, a businessman and Republican fundraiser who served as deputy finance chairman of the RNC from 2017 to 2018, has faced multiple legal proceedings involving the misuse of political influence. In 2009, he entered a misdemeanor plea after being charged with providing improper gratuities to New York State pension officials in connection with a $250 million investment in his fund. In 2020, he pleaded guilty to conspiring to act as an unregistered foreign agent, admitting to secretly lobbying the Trump administration on behalf of Malaysian and Chinese interests; he was subsequently pardoned by President Trump.

== See also ==
- Abuse of rights
- Abuse of Power
- High crimes and misdemeanors
- Malfeasance in office
- Misfeasance in public office
- Oppression
- Power harassment
- Rankism
