= Kris (disambiguation) =

A kris is an asymmetrical dagger indigenous to Java, Indonesia.

Kris or KRIS may also refer to:

== Arts and media ==
=== TV ===
- Kris or The Kris Aquino Show, a Philippine talk show hosted by Kris Aquino
- Kris (TV series) or Kris Jenner Show, a short-lived U.S. talk show hosted by Kris Jenner
- Kris TV, a Philippine morning lifestyle talk show hosted by Kris Aquino
- KRIS-TV, an NBC affiliate in South Texas, U.S.
  - KRIS-DT2, an affiliate subchannel of KRIS-TV

=== Other arts and media ===
- Crisis (1946 film) (Swedish: Kris), a Swedish film directed by Ingmar Bergman
- Kris (magazine), a defunct Swedish magazine

== Names ==
- Kris Kringle, another name for Santa Claus
- Kris (name), a unisex given name and a surname, including a list of persons and fictional characters with the name
- Kristina Dörfer (born 1984), German singer and actress known by the stage name Kris

== Other uses ==
- Kris (chimpanzee) (1982–2010), one-time alpha male of the group studied by Jane Goodall
- Kris (horse) (1976–2004), a racehorse and sire
- Kris (Romani court), a traditional court for conflict resolution

== See also ==
- Cris (disambiguation)
- Krish (disambiguation)
- Kriss (disambiguation)
- Criss
- Chris
- Christine (name), including Kristine
- Christopher (name), including Kristoffer and Kristopher
- Kristjan
