= Kri =

Kri or KRI may refer to:

== Ethnicity ==
- Kri people, an ethnic group of Laos

== Languages ==
- Kri language, a Vietic language
- Krio language (ISO 639-3 ISO language code kri), spoken in Sierra Leone

== Other uses ==
- Key risk indicator, a measure used in management
- Kikori Airport (IATA code KRI), airport in Kikori, Papua New Guinea
- Koichi's Ruby Interpreter, for the programming language
- Kri (film), a 2018 Nepalese film
- Karikho Kri, politician from Arunachal Pradesh, India
- Indonesian Navy ship prefix KRI (Indonesian: Kapal Perang Republik Indonesia)
- Kranji railway station, West Java, Indonesia (station code)
- Kurdistan Region of Iraq, an autonomous region in northern Iraq
- Russian Game Developers Conference (KRI; Russian: Конференция Разработчиков Игр; КРИ)
- Kiribati (Commonwealth Sport country code)

== See also ==
- Kris (disambiguation)
