= Marvin G. Richardson =

American officeholder (born 1965)

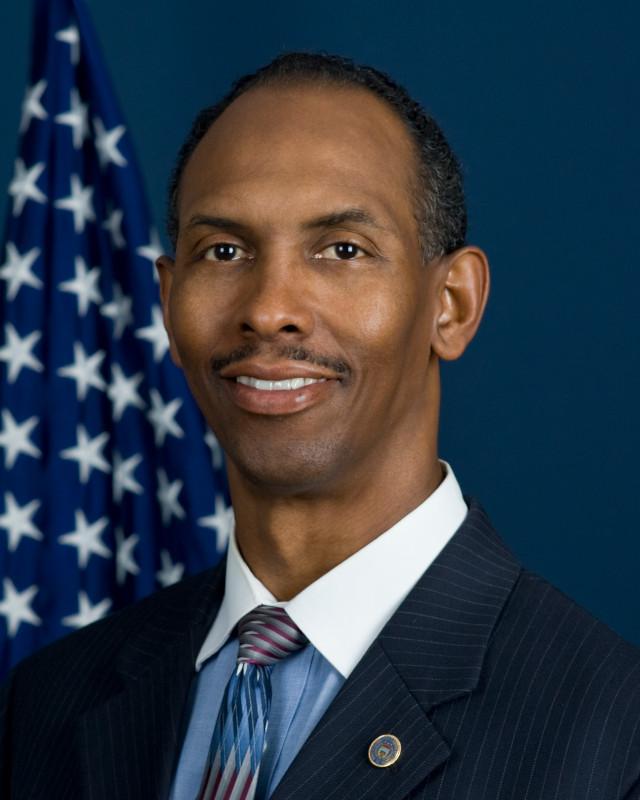

Deputy Director of the Bureau of Alcohol, Tobacco, Firearms and Explosives
- In office October 29, 2019 – April 9, 2025
- President: Donald Trump; Joe Biden; Donald Trump
- Succeeded by: Robert Cekada

Director of the Bureau of Alcohol, Tobacco, Firearms and Explosives
- Acting
- In office January 17, 2025 – February 24, 2025
- President: Joe Biden; Donald Trump
- Preceded by: Steve Dettelbach
- Succeeded by: Kash Patel (acting)
- In office June 4, 2021 – April 24, 2022
- President: Joe Biden
- Preceded by: Regina Lombardo (acting)
- Succeeded by: Gary M. Restaino (acting)

Personal details
- Education: University of North Texas (BBA); Amberton University (MS)
- Awards: Hostile Action Service Medal; Presidential Rank Award

Marvin G. Richardson is an American retired law enforcement officer who served as the deputy director of the Bureau of Alcohol, Tobacco, Firearms and Explosives from 2019 to 2025. He also served as the bureau's acting director from 2021 to 2022, and again in 2025.

== Early life and education ==
Richardson grew up in Fort Worth, Texas, as the youngest of ten children. His parents were a custodian and a construction worker.

Richardson attended the University of North Texas, where he earned a Bachelor of Business Administration. He later attended Amberton University and earned a Master of Science in Human Relations and Business.

== Career ==
Richardson began his career in software quality assurance. He later became a Texas police officer, spending five years in the position, where he rose to the rank of Lieutenant. Following this, he began working for the Bureau of Alcohol, Tobacco, Firearms and Explosives in 1989. Richardson was present at the controversial 1993 Waco siege, which led to the deaths of 82 civilians and 4 ATF agents. He was awarded the Hostile Action Service Medal for his role during the siege. In a 1995 interview, Richardson stated that while ATF leadership mislead him about the raid, he did not blame them for what occurred.

Richardson was appointed deputy director of ATF on October 29, 2019.

Richardson served as the acting director of ATF from June 4, 2021 to April 24, 2022. President Joe Biden later replaced Richardson with Gary M. Restaino. During the Biden administration, Richardson faced Democratic criticism for delaying bans on homemade firearms and perceived friendliness with gun industry leaders. National Review attributed Richardson's replacement due to aforementioned criticism, as did Fox News contributors Jeanine Pirro and Buck Sexton.

In January 2025, Richardson again briefly served as acting director, following the resignation of Steve Dettelbach on January 17. On February 24, he was succeeded in the role by Kash Patel. Richardson resigned from the ATF on April 9 after receiving an ultimatum to step down or be fired.

== Personal life ==
Richardson and his wife, an attorney, have six children.

Government offices
Preceded by Regina Lombardo; Acting	Director of the Bureau of Alcohol, Tobacco, Firearms and Explosives; Acting; 2021–2022	Succeeded by Gary M. Restaino; Acting
Preceded by Steve Dettelbach	Director of the Bureau of Alcohol, Tobacco, Firearms and Explosives; Acting; 2025	Succeeded by Kash Patel; Acting
