= Steve Dettelbach =

American attorney (born 1965)

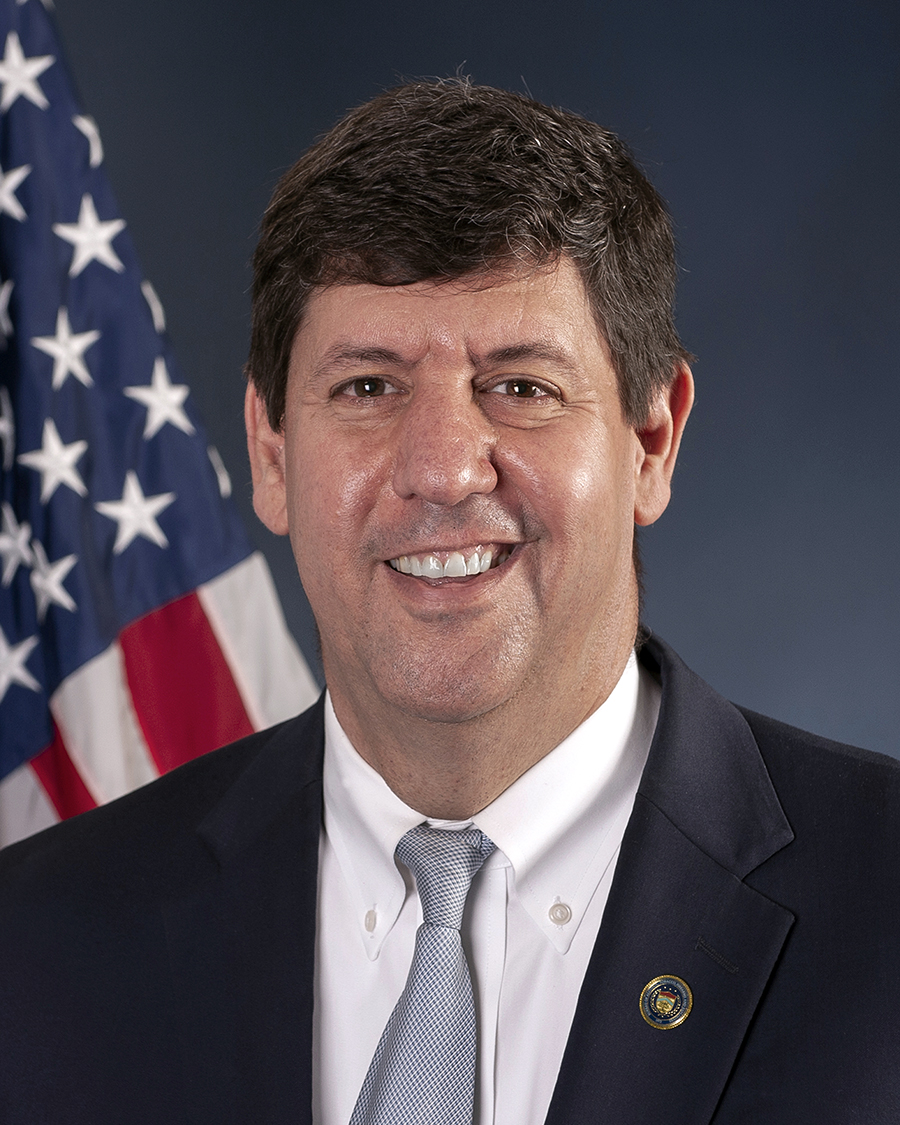

8th Director of the Bureau of Alcohol, Tobacco, Firearms and Explosives
- In office July 13, 2022 – January 17, 2025
- President: Joe Biden
- Preceded by: B. Todd Jones (2015)
- Succeeded by: Robert Cekada

United States Attorney for the Northern District of Ohio
- In office September 15, 2009 – February 5, 2016
- President: Barack Obama
- Preceded by: William Edwards
- Succeeded by: Carole Rendon

Personal details
- Born: Steven Michael Dettelbach; November 29, 1965 (age 60) Cleveland, Ohio, U.S.
- Party: Democratic
- Education: Dartmouth College (BA); Harvard University (JD)

Steven Michael Dettelbach (born November 29, 1965) is an American lawyer who served as the eighth director of the Bureau of Alcohol, Tobacco, Firearms and Explosives (ATF) from 2022 to 2025. He was the United States attorney for the Northern District of Ohio for over six years during the presidency of Barack Obama, resigning in 2016. From 2016 to 2022, he was a partner at BakerHostetler, serving as co-leader of the firm's national White Collar Defense and Corporate Investigations team. In July 2022, he was appointed by President Joe Biden and confirmed by the Senate as the director of ATF.

== Early life and education ==
Dettelbach was born in Cleveland in 1965. His parents, Marcia and Tom Dettelbach, were both prominent attorneys in Cleveland's Jewish community. He attended high school at Hawken School, then graduated summa cum laude from Dartmouth College in 1988. He studied at Harvard Law School, graduating magna cum laude. While at Harvard, he served as notes editor for the Harvard Civil Rights–Civil Liberties Law Review and volunteered representing indigent people in the Boston area for the Harvard Defenders.

== Career ==
Dettelbach began his legal career as a law clerk for Judge Stanley Sporkin of the United States District Court for the District of Columbia.

Dettelbach joined the United States Department of Justice Civil Rights Division, Criminal section in 1992 as a trial lawyer and also served as the acting deputy chief there under Richard W. Roberts (who was later appointed a judge of the United States District Court for the District of Columbia by President Bill Clinton). Dettelbach handled several high-profile cases in the Civil Rights Division, including an involuntary servitude case involving 70 Thai garment workers in California, which came to be known as the El Monte slavery case.

He became an assistant United States attorney in Maryland from 1997 to 2001 and was named deputy chief of the Southern Division of that office, which covers the suburbs of Washington, D.C.

He was then detailed as counsel to Chairman Patrick Leahy of the U.S. Senate Judiciary Committee from 2001 to 2003. There, he worked on oversight and policy, including the enforcement provisions of the Sarbanes–Oxley Act.

From 2003 to 2006, Dettelbach was an Assistant U.S. Attorney in Cleveland, working on the Organized Crime and Corruption Task Force. In that position, he prosecuted significant corruption cases, including United States v. Nate Gray, a series of cases involving a pay-to-play municipal corruption scheme. He also prosecuted US v. Budd, a case involving a series of beatings by guards and senior managers at a jail in Youngstown, Ohio, resulting in eight convictions on civil rights and obstruction of justice charges.

He was a partner at BakerHostetler from 2006 to 2009 and again since 2016 where he worked on litigation and regulatory matters, as well as conducting internal investigations for clients. He was also appointed by Ohio Governor Ted Strickland to serve on the Ohio Ethics Commission.

=== Political activities and campaigns ===
Dettelbach was a volunteer on U.S. Representative Ted Strickland's 2006 campaign for Ohio governor, offering policy advice, and participating in fundraising and grassroots activities.

Dettelbach volunteered for Barack Obama's 2008 presidential campaign, providing legal assistance and advice. He also served as an advisor on Obama's transition team.

Dettelbach was a candidate for Ohio attorney general in the 2018 elections. On January 16, 2017, The Plain Dealer reported that Dettelbach had started raising money for his likely campaign. He announced his run for the office on May 30, 2017. Dettelbach was defeated by Republican state Auditor Dave Yost in the November 2018 general election.

=== United States Attorney (2009–2016) ===
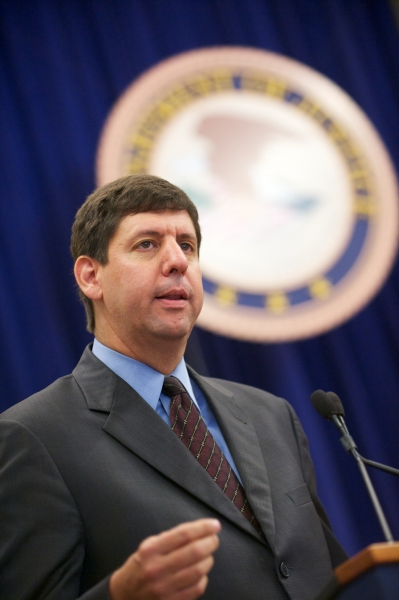
Dettelbach speaks on the Americans with Disabilities Act in 2012

On July 10, 2009, President Barack Obama nominated Dettelbach to be U.S. attorney for the Northern District of Ohio. Dettelbach was a classmate of Obama's at Harvard and worked with him as a summer associate at a Chicago law firm. Dettelbach was unanimously confirmed by the Senate on September 15, 2009. He had been recommended by U.S. Senator Sherrod Brown after the senator appointed a search committee to make a recommendation to him. Attorney General Eric Holder appointed Dettelbach to the Attorney General's Advisory Committee and he chairs the group's Civil Rights subcommittee.

Dettelbach has made civil rights enforcement, both criminal and civil, a priority in his time as United States Attorney. His office prosecuted the largest case, in terms of the number of defendants, under the Matthew Shepard and James Byrd Jr. Hate Crimes Prevention Act. In that case, Samuel Mullet was sentenced to more than 12 years in prison and 15 other defendants were sentenced to prison for their roles in a series of religiously motivated attacks on practitioners of the Amish faith.

His office also secured a guilty plea to hate-crimes charges from an Indiana man who drove to northwest Ohio and set fire to the Islamic Center of Greater Toledo. The plea agreement included a binding recommendation for a 20-year prison sentence. That came more than a year after a white supremacist was sentenced to prison for setting fire to the only predominantly African American church in Conneaut, Ohio, an event Dettelbach used as the basis for the formation of United Against Hate, an interfaith group committed to religious tolerance.

The office has also pursued civil remedies to civil rights issues, including successfully suing for the use of a bilingual ballot in Cuyahoga County under the Voting Rights Act of 1965 and entering a consent decree to reform the Cleveland Division of Police. These reforms call for more training, oversight and civilian input with the police department.

On January 20, 2016, Dettelbach announced that he would resign on February 5 and return to BakerHostetler to practice law.

=== ATF director ===
On April 10, 2022, Dettelbach was announced as President Joe Biden's second nominee to lead the Bureau of Alcohol, Tobacco, Firearms and Explosives, in an attempt to fill the role after Biden's first nominee pick, David Chipman, was withdrawn from consideration on September 9, 2021. On April 25, 2022, his nomination was sent to the Senate. According to NPR, "ATF, which plays a key role in gun regulations, hasn't had a permanent director since 2015, and there has been only one since the agency became a Senate-confirmed position in 2006."

On May 25, 2022, a hearing on his nomination took place before the Senate Judiciary Committee. The hearing's Republican members questioned him about his position on assault weapons, while Dettelbach promised that he would "never let politics in any way influence my action as ATF director." On June 16, 2022, the Senate Judiciary Committee deadlocked on his nomination by a 11–11 vote. The United States Senate moved to discharge his nomination from the committee later that day by a vote of 52‍–‍41. On July 12, 2022, the Senate invoked cloture on his nomination by a 48–46 vote. The Senate confirmed his nomination later that day by the same margin, making him the first confirmed ATF director since the departure of B. Todd Jones in 2015. He was sworn in the next day by Merrick Garland, the Attorney General.

Dettelbach resigned from ATF on January 17, 2025.

== Personal life ==
Dettelbach and his wife, Karil, have two children. They married in September 2000.

Dettelbach is Jewish.

== See also ==
- List of Jewish American jurists

Legal offices
Preceded by William Edwards	United States Attorney for the Northern District of Ohio; 2009–2016	Succeeded by Carole Rendon
Party political offices
Preceded by David Pepper	Democratic nominee for Attorney General of Ohio; 2018	Succeeded by Jeffrey Crossman
Government offices
Preceded by Gary M. Restaino; Acting	Director of the Bureau of Alcohol, Tobacco, Firearms and Explosives; 2022–2025	Succeeded by Marvin G. Richardson; Acting
