= Justice Connection =

Nonprofit advocacy organization

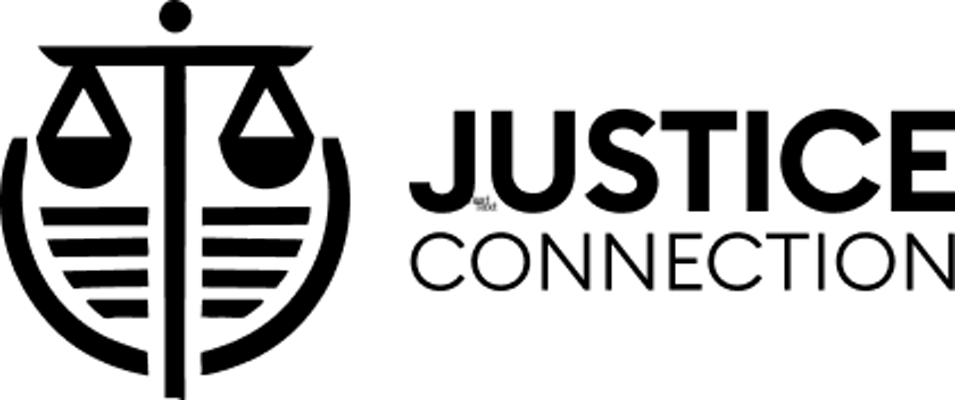
- Formation: January 31, 2025; 21 months ago
- Founder: Stacey Young
- Type: Nonprofit advocacy organization
- Purpose: Support and advocacy for current and former U.S. Department of Justice civil servants
- Region served: United States
- Services: Pro bono legal representation; Employment assistance; Media relations; Mental health support
- Official language: English
- Executive Director: Stacey Young
- Communications Director: Peter Carr
- Key people: Regina Lombardo (Advisory Committee); Greg Brower (Advisory Committee); Jocelyn Samuels (Advisory Committee)

Justice Connection is a nonprofit advocacy organization that supports current and former civil servants at the U.S. Department of Justice (DOJ). Services include pro bono legal representation, employment assistance, media relations, and mental health support. The group also defends DOJ’s career employees and their work in the press and before Congress.

The organization was established in 2025 by former Justice Department career attorney Stacey Young. It was founded in anticipation of the terminations and a broader wave of voluntary departures at the Department of Justice. The New York Times reported the group offers support to Justice Department employees on issues including whistleblowing, interactions with the news media, and security, and assisting employees who leave government service.

== History ==
Justice Connection was founded on January 31, 2025, by Stacey Young, an 18-year veteran of the DOJ who resigned from the department a week prior. In 2016, Young founded the DOJ Gender Equality Network, which she ran while serving as a senior attorney in the Civil Division, and later in the Civil Rights Division.

On the day of the organization’s launch, Young testified at a congressional briefing led by U.S. Rep. Jamie Raskin and U.S. House Committee on the Judiciary Democrats titled "Rights, Recourses, and Resources for DOJ Employees Targeted by Trump." The briefing focused on the Trump administration’s treatment of career DOJ employees, including removals, demotions, involuntary reassignments, and the administration’s deferred resignation program.

In February 2025, Justice Connection organized an open letter signed by more than 1,200 former federal prosecutors to show support for DOJ attorneys following the Trump administration’s pressure on Southern District of New York and Public Integrity Section lawyers to dismiss the corruption charges against New York City Mayor Eric Adams. Signatories included Special Counsel Jack Smith and Watergate prosecutors.

Justice Connection aired a TV ad in March 2025 on Fox News criticizing the Trump administration’s firing of national security officials and proposal to combine the Bureau of Alcohol, Tobacco, Firearms and Explosives (ATF) and the Drug Enforcement Administration (DEA). After the ad was posted on YouTube, YouTube took down the video and Justice Connection’s channel claiming it violated the company’s misinformation policy. The video was restored after a Washington Post reporter contacted YouTube, with a company spokesperson saying the “channel was mistakenly terminated.”

On April 7, 2025, Young testified at a bicameral hearing led by U.S. Rep. Jamie Raskin and U.S. Sen. Adam Schiff titled “Restoring Accountability: Exposing Trump’s Attacks on the Rule of Law.” The hearing focused on allegations of the Trump administration coercing law firms, intimidating DOJ staff, and undermining legal norms.

Later that month, Civil Rights Division Assistant Attorney General Harmeet Dhillon issued new mission statements for the division’s sections and reassigned section chiefs to unrelated offices. These actions prompted a mass “exodus” with the division losing approximately 70% of its attorneys at that time. Young criticized the move, telling the New York Times that “With the reckless dismantling of the division, we’ll see unchecked discrimination and constitutional violations in schools, housing, employment, voting, prisons, by police departments and in many other realms of our daily lives.”

Justice Connection led a public campaign opposing the nomination of Emil Bove III to the United States Court of Appeals for the Third Circuit, arguing that his conduct as a senior Justice Department political appointee made him unfit for the federal bench. The group organized media outreach and advocacy videos, supported whistleblowers, and circulated a letter signed by more than 900 former Department of Justice attorneys urging the Senate to reject the nomination.

Ahead of U.S. Attorney General Pam Bondi’s first congressional testimony since her confirmation, Justice Connection organized a letter signed by almost 300 DOJ employees who had recently left, calling on Congress to increase oversight of the Justice Department.

Justice Connection compiled a collection of farewell messages from some of the DOJ staff who departed since January 2025 through resignations, terminations, or deferred resignation program offers under the Trump Administration. Some of the messages said department leadership had caused lasting harm to the institution and fostered a toxic work environment.

The F.B.I. Support Network was formed as an offshoot to assist F.B.I. agents, analysts and support staff in a similar manner.

== Organization structure and leadership ==
Stacey Young serves as the executive director. Peter Carr serves as the organization’s communications director. Carr served as a government spokesman for nearly 25 years, with more than 15 years at the Justice Department.

Justice Connection has an advisory committee composed of DOJ alumni, including former acting Director of the Bureau of Alcohol, Tobacco, Firearms and Explosives (ATF) Regina Lombardo, former U.S. Attorney for the District of Nevada Greg Brower, and former Commissioner on the Equal Employment Opportunity Commission (EEOC) Jocelyn Samuels. Other members of the committee include a retired immigration judge, a former FBI special agent, and former senior attorneys from DOJ's Civil Division, Civil Rights Division, and Environment and Natural Resources Division.

== See also ==
- 2025 U.S. Department of Justice resignations
- 2025 United States federal mass layoffs
- Project 2025 § Law enforcement
- Government targeting of political opponents and civil society under the second Trump administration
