= Kris (name) =

Kris is both a unisex given name and a surname. It may refer to:

== People ==
=== Given name ===
- Kris Abrams-Draine (born 2001), American football player
- Kris Allen (born 1985), American musician and winner of season eight of American Idol
- Kris Aquino (born 1971), Filipino actress and host
- Kris Bankston (born 1999), American basketball player
- Kris Bernal (born 1989), Filipino actress
- Kris Boyd (born 1983), Scottish footballer
- Kris Boyd (American football) (born 1996), American football player
- Kris Bryant (born 1992), American baseball player
- Kris Clyburn (born 1996), American basketball player
- Kris Commons (born 1983), English-born Scottish footballer
- Kris Dunn (born 1994), American basketball player
- Kris Gemmell (born 1977), New Zealand triathlete
- Kris George, Australian former professional boxer
- Kris Goodjohn (born 1978), Canadian former ice hockey player
- Kris Goossens (born 1974), Belgian former professional tennis player
- Kris Gopalakrishnan (born 1955), Indian businessman
- Kris Graves (born 1982), American photographer
- Kris Griffin (born 1981), American former football linebacker
- Kris Griffiths-Jones, Australian football referee
- Kris Gutiérrez, American professor
- Kris Humphries (born 1985), American basketball player
- Kris Jenner (born 1955), American television personality
- Kris Johnson (baseball) (born 1984), American baseball player
- Kris Johnson (basketball) (born 1975), American basketball player
- Kris Jordan (1977–2023), American politician
- Kris Kristofferson (1936–2024), American country music singer, songwriter, and actor
- Kris Lawrence (born 1982), Filipino-American musician
- Kris Letang (born 1987), Canadian ice hockey player
- Kris Mangum (born 1973), American football player
- Kris Marshall (born 1973), English film and TV actor
- Kris McNichol, Canadian politician
- Kris Mitchell (born 2000), American football player
- Kris Mrksa, Australian screenwriter
- Kris Pister, American professor at University of California, Berkeley
- Kris Richard (born 1979), American football coach and former football player
- Kris Richard (basketball) (born 1989), US-born Romanian basketball player
- Kris Richard (racing driver) (born 1994), Swiss racing driver
- Kris Wilkes (born 1998), American basketball player
- Kris Wu (born 1990), Canadian rapper and former member of boy band Exo

=== Surname ===
- David S. Kris (born 1966), American lawyer
- Ernst Kris (1900–1957), American psychoanalyst and art historian

== Fictional characters ==
- Kris, the female protagonist of the video game Pokémon Crystal
- Kris Dreemurr, the main protagonist of Deltarune
- Kris, default name for the player's avatar in Fire Emblem: New Mystery of the Emblem

== See also ==
- Kris (disambiguation)
- Kriss (given name)
- Kriss (surname)
