= David S. Kris =

American lawyer

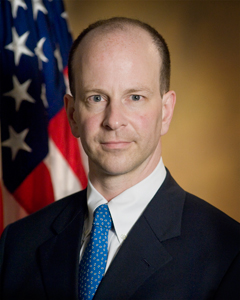

United States Assistant Attorney General for the National Security Division
- In office 2009–2011
- President: Barack Obama
- Preceded by: J. Patrick Rowan
- Succeeded by: Lisa Monaco

Associate Deputy Attorney General
- In office 2000–2003
- President: Bill Clinton; George W. Bush
- Preceded by: Multi-member position
- Succeeded by: Multi-member position

Personal details
- Born: September 28, 1966 (age 59) Brookline, Massachusetts, U.S.
- Education: Haverford College (BA); Harvard Law School (JD)

David Steven Kris (born September 28, 1966) is an American lawyer. From 2009 to 2011, he served as the United States Assistant Attorney General for the National Security Division of the United States Department of Justice. He also served as the Associate Deputy Attorney General for national security issues at the United States Department of Justice from 2000 to 2003.

== Early life and education ==
Kris grew up in Brookline, Massachusetts. He received his undergraduate degree from Haverford College in 1988, and his J.D. degree from Harvard Law School in 1991.

After completing law school, Kris clerked for United States Appeals Court Judge Stephen S. Trott on the United States Court of Appeals for the Ninth Circuit.

== Career ==
For eight years, Kris served in the criminal division in the Office of the U.S. Attorney for the District of Columbia. Kris became an associate deputy attorney general for national security issues in 2000. In 2003, Kris left the Department of Justice (DOJ) to become a counsel, chief ethics and compliance officer and senior vice president at Time Warner. He remained at Time Warner until rejoining the DOJ.

In 2009, President Barack Obama nominated Kris for assistant attorney general in charge of the Justice Department's National Security Division, which was created in 2006. The United States Senate confirmed Kris in a 97–0 vote on March 25, 2009.

=== Criticism of warrantless domestic wiretapping ===
Kris attracted significant public attention when he released a 23-page legal memorandum, in his personal capacity, sharply criticizing the George W. Bush administration's legal argument that it had authority to conduct warrantless domestic wiretapping due to the Authorization for Use of Military Force Against Terrorists passed by Congress on September 18, 2001. Law professor Marty Lederman called Kris's memo "by a large measure the most thorough and careful—and, for those reasons, the most devastating—critique anyone has offered of the DOJ argument that Congress statutorily authorized the NSA program." He also makes shorter arguments regarding the Fourth Amendment implications of the warrantless domestic spying and the administration's "unitary executive theory" of Article 2 of the U.S. Constitution. Kris wrote the memorandum in January 2006, and released it to journalists on March 8, 2006. Kris had also exchanged a series of emails with Courtney Elwood, an associate counsel to Attorney General Alberto Gonzales, debating the legal arguments, which were released by the Electronic Privacy Information Center after obtaining them under the Freedom of Information Act.

Kris had been a high-ranking DOJ lawyer in the Bush administration for several years, and had appeared before Congress to advocate for the administration's positions regarding the Foreign Intelligence Surveillance Act (FISA) and the USA PATRIOT Act. He had furthermore previously appeared before Congress in his personal capacity, after leaving the DOJ, to continue advocating for the government to have enhanced flexibility under FISA and the PATRIOT Act.

=== Later career ===
In 2011, Kris joined Intellectual Ventures as general counsel.

Political offices
Preceded by Multi-member position	Associate Deputy Attorney General; 2000–2003	Succeeded by Multi-member position
Preceded by J. Patrick Rowan	United States Assistant Attorney General for the National Security Division; 2009–2011	Succeeded by Lisa Monaco
