= 2018 Ohio Attorney General election =

- November 6, 2018
- Turnout: 55.79% ▲15.14pp
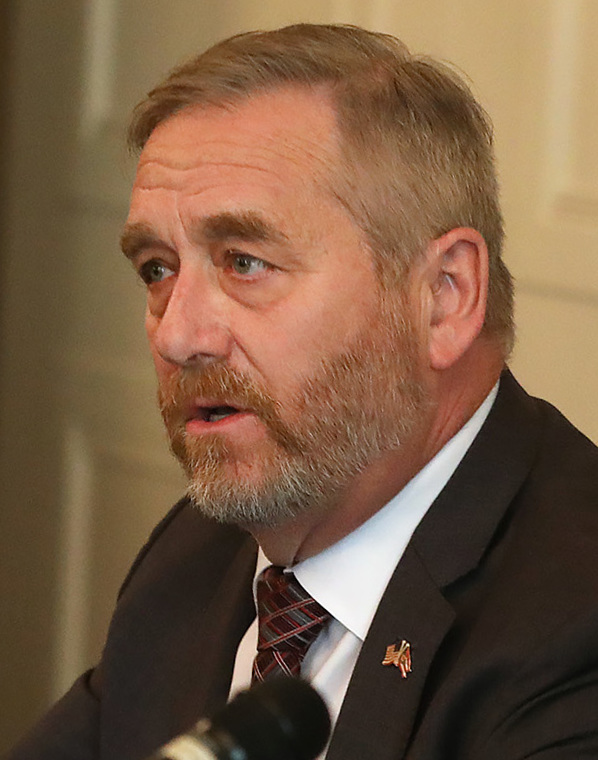

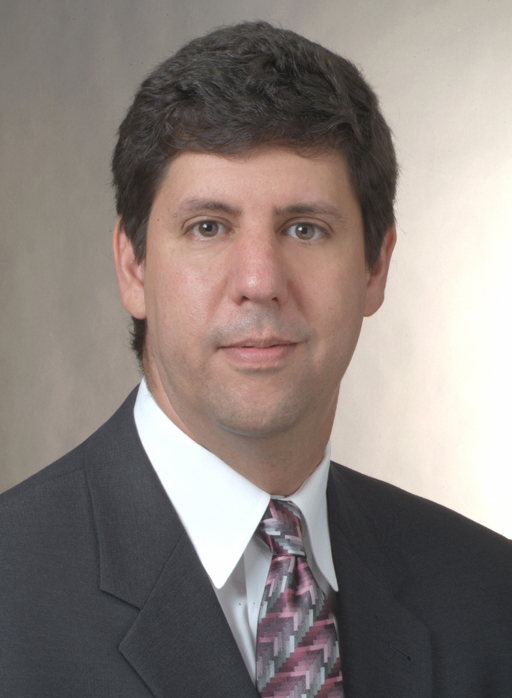
Nominee	Dave Yost	Steve Dettelbach
Party	Republican	Democratic
Popular vote	2,276,414	2,086,715
Percentage	52.17%	47.83%
- Yost: 50–60% 60–70% 70–80% 80–90% >90% Dettelbach: 50–60% 60–70% 70–80% 80–90% >90% Tie: 50% No votes
Attorney General before election
Mike DeWine
Republican
Elected Attorney General
Dave Yost
Republican

The 2018 Ohio Attorney General election took place on November 6, 2018, to elect the attorney general of Ohio.

Incumbent Attorney General Mike DeWine was term-limited and ran for governor. Republican nominee and Ohio State Auditor Dave Yost defeated Democratic nominee and former US Attorney Steve Dettelbach in the general election.

== Republican primary ==
=== Candidates ===
==== Nominee ====
- Dave Yost, State Auditor

==== Declined ====
- Keith Faber, state representative and former Ohio Senate president (successfully ran for State Auditor)

=== Results ===
Republican primary results
Party	Candidate	Votes	%
Republican	Dave Yost	642,717	100.0
Total votes		642,717	100.0

== Democratic primary ==
=== Candidates ===
==== Nominee ====
- Steve Dettelbach, former United States Attorney for the Northern District of Ohio

==== Declined ====
- Connie Pillich, former state representative and nominee for Ohio State Treasurer in 2014 (ran for governor, later withdrew)
- Joe Schiavoni, Minority Leader of the Ohio Senate (unsuccessfully ran for governor)

=== Results ===
Democratic primary results
Party	Candidate	Votes	%
Democratic	Steve Dettelbach	510,741	100.0
Total votes		510,741	100.0

== General election ==
=== Candidates ===
- Steve Dettelbach, former United States Attorney for the Northern District of Ohio
- Dave Yost, State Auditor

=== Predictions ===
Source	Ranking	As of
Governing	Tossup	October 26, 2018

=== Endorsements ===
Dave Yost (R)

Organizations

- Ohio Chamber of Commerce
- Ohio Society of CPAs

Newspapers

- The Columbus Dispatch
Steve Dettelbach (D)

Politicians

- Joe Biden, 47th vice president of the United States
- Barack Obama, 44th president of the United States

Newspapers

- Akron Beacon Journal
- The Chronicle Telegram
- Plain Dealer
- The Toledo Blade

=== Polling ===
Poll source	Date(s) administered	Sample size	Margin of error	Dave Yost (R)	Steve Dettelbach (D)	Undecided
Cygnal (R)	October 30–31, 2018	503	± 4.4%	46%	43%	12%
Baldwin Wallace University	October 19–27, 2018	1,051	± 3.8%	38%	40%	20%
Change Research (D-Innovation Ohio)	August 31 – September 4, 2018	822	± 3.0%	41%	37%	22%
Fallon Research	May 21–25, 2018	800	± 3.5%	41%	32%	27%

=== Results ===
Dave Yost won the general election by a 4.34% margin of victory.

General election results
Party	Candidate	Votes	%	±%
Republican	Dave Yost	2,276,414	52.17%	−9.33%
Democratic	Steve Dettelbach	2,086,715	47.83%	+9.33%
Total votes		4,363,129	100.0	N/A
Republican hold				

==== By congressional district ====
Yost won 12 of 16 congressional districts.

District	Yost	Dettelbach	Representative
1st	53%	47%	Steve Chabot
2nd	56%	44%	Brad Wenstrup
3rd	31%	69%	Joyce Beatty
4th	65%	35%	Jim Jordan
5th	60%	40%	Bob Latta
6th	66%	34%	Bill Johnson
7th	61%	39%	Bob Gibbs
8th	66%	34%	Warren Davidson
9th	36%	64%	Marcy Kaptur
10th	53%	47%	Mike Turner
11th	18%	82%	Marcia Fudge
12th	56%	44%	Pat Tiberi
13th	43%	57%	Tim Ryan
14th	52%	48%	David Joyce
15th	57%	43%	Steve Stivers
16th	54%	46%	Anthony Gonzalez

== See also ==
- 2018 Ohio elections
- 2018 United States attorney general elections
