= Regina Lombardo =

American government official (born 1962)

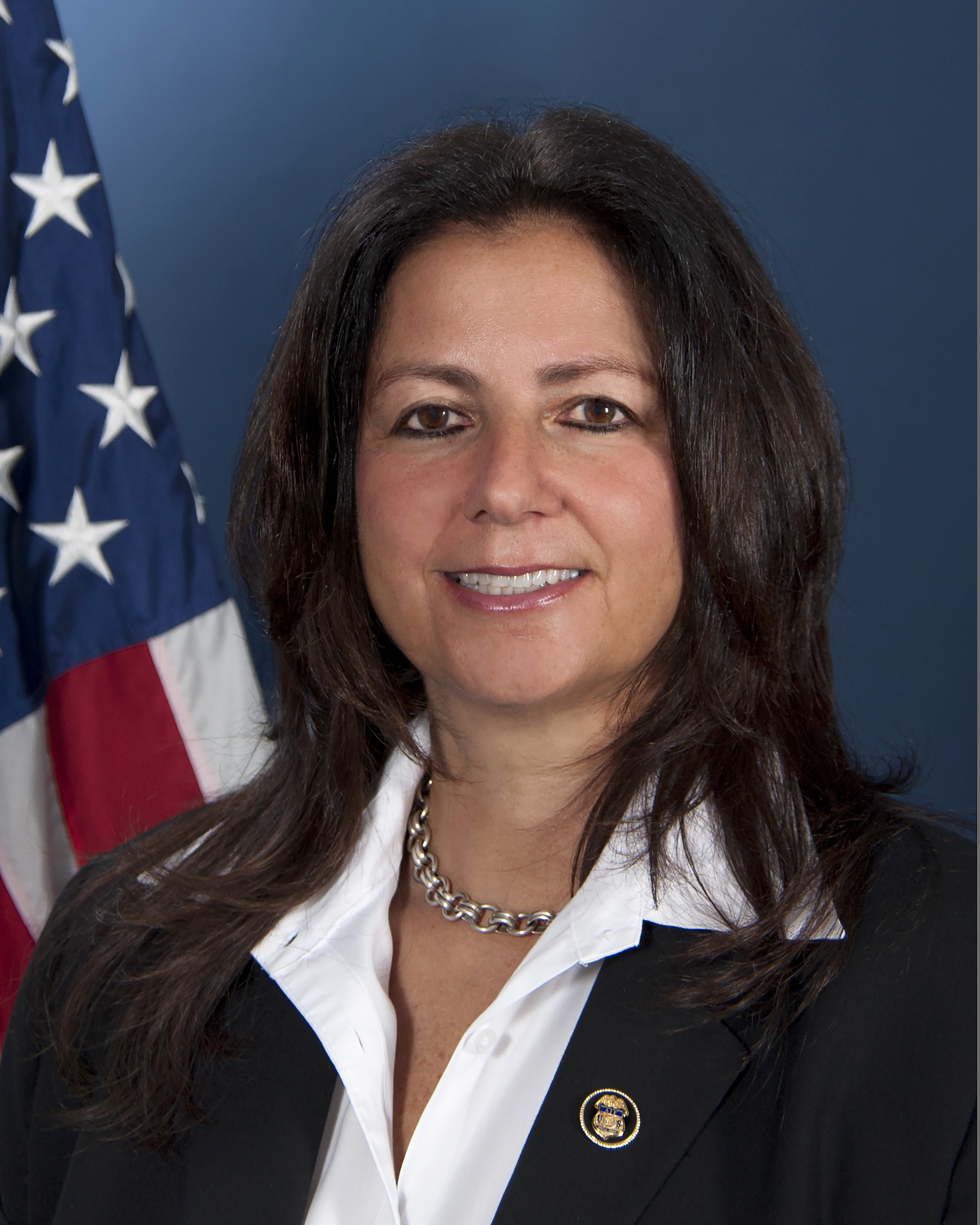

Acting Director of the Bureau of Alcohol, Tobacco, Firearms and Explosives
- In office May 1, 2019 – June 3, 2021
- President: Donald Trump; Joe Biden
- Preceded by: B. Todd Jones; Thomas Brandon (acting)
- Succeeded by: Marvin G. Richardson (acting)

Personal details
- Born: December 21, 1962 (age 63) Manhattan, New York, U.S.
- Education: University of South Florida (BA)

Regina Lombardo is an American law enforcement official previously serving as acting director of the Bureau of Alcohol, Tobacco, Firearms and Explosives (ATF).

== Early life and education ==
Lombardo was born in Manhattan on December 21, 1962, the daughter of Italian immigrants. As a child, her family moved to Cape Coral, Florida. After attending Bishop Verot High School, Lombardo earned a Bachelor of Arts degree in criminal justice from the University of South Florida.

== Career ==
Lombardo began her career with the Bureau of Alcohol, Tobacco, Firearms in 1992 as a special agent at the field office in Miami. Lombardo eventually served as Group Supervisor for the High Intensity Drug Trafficking Area Task Force in Miami, Assistant ATF Country Attaché in Toronto, Chief of the ATF Leadership Institute, Assistant Special Agent in Charge of the New York City Field Division, Special Agent in Charge of the Tampa Field Division, Deputy Assistant Director of Field Operations for the Central Region, and Assistant Director of the Office of Human Resources and Professional Development.

Lombardo served as Acting Deputy Director of ATF from March 2018 until she was formally nominated to serve as Acting Director by the Attorney General, William Barr, on April 24, 2019. Lombardo took office on May 1, 2019, succeeding Thomas Brandon, who was retiring.

In May 2021, the Metropolitan Museum of Art announced that it had appointed Lombardo as Chief Security Officer.
