= Christopher Cross (disambiguation) =

Christopher Cross (born 1951) is an American singer-songwriter.

Christopher Cross may also refer to:

- Christopher Cross (album), an album by Christopher Cross
- Christopher Cross (cricketer) (1852–1919), New Zealand cricketer and businessman
- Christopher Cross, Prince Edward Island, a settlement in Prince Edward Island
- Chris Griffin, character from Family Guy whose full name is Christopher Cross Griffin

== See also ==
- Chris Cross (disambiguation)
