= Michael G. Bailey =

American attorney

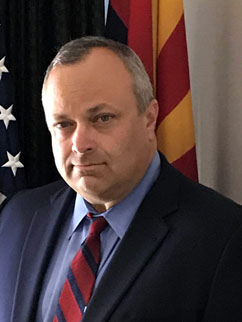
- Bailey in 2019

United States Attorney for the District of Arizona
- In office June 2019 – February 28, 2021
- President: Donald Trump; Joe Biden
- Preceded by: John S. Leonardo Elizabeth A. Strange (Acting, Jan 2017 - June 2019)
- Succeeded by: Gary M. Restaino

Personal details
- Education: Westmont College (BA); Sandra Day O'Connor College of Law (JD)

Michael G. Bailey is an American attorney from Arizona. He formerly served as the United States Attorney for the District of Arizona.

== Education ==
Bailey graduated from Westmont College in 1987. He received his Juris Doctor from the Sandra Day O'Connor College of Law, formerly Arizona State University College of Law, in 1990. He was admitted to practice law in Arizona on October 26, 1991.

== Legal and professional career ==
Bailey previously was a Maricopa County prosecutor, where he prosecuted homicides, violent crimes, and cases involving vulnerable populations. In 2004, Bailey ran for Maricopa County Attorney in a crowded Republican primary. Bailey later went into private law practice. In 2015, he joined the Arizona Attorney General's Office to serve as chief deputy and chief of staff.

== U.S. Attorney for the District of Arizona ==
In February 2017, Bailey was under consideration for appointment as U.S. Attorney for the District of Arizona. On February 12, 2019, his nomination was sent to the United States Senate. Arizona Senator Martha McSally voiced her support of his nomination.

On May 1, 2019, Bailey was sworn in as the interim United States Attorney for the District of Arizona.

On May 2, 2019, his nomination was reported out of committee by voice vote. On May 24, 2019, Bailey's nomination was unanimously confirmed by the United States Senate. He was sworn in sometime in June 2019.

While in office, Bailey supported and enforced the immigration policies of Donald Trump. The administration's policies included actions by federal agents to forcibly separate children from their parents under the guise of fighting illegal immigration, which a federal court found to be a "brutal" violation of the U.S. Constitution. They also included the criminal prosecution of ordinary civilians who were not otherwise engaged in criminal activity such as drug smuggling. Consistent with these policies, Bailey's office criminally charged an American human rights volunteer, Dr. Scott Warren, for maintaining food and water stations for undocumented migrants in the Arizona desert. Approximately 3,000 migrants have died in Arizona's harsh climate from 2001 to 2017, due in part to deliberate federal policies that "funnel" migrants through this more treacherous terrain. The prosecution ended in failure. A federal jury unanimously found Warren not guilty of "harboring" undocumented migrants. Bailey said, "Although we're disappointed in the verdict, it won't deter us from continuing to prosecute all the entry and re-entry cases we have, as well as all the harboring and smuggling and trafficking cases that we have." Warren, speaking after the verdict, said, "The government failed in its attempt to criminalize basic human kindness.”

On February 8, 2021, he along with 55 other Trump-era U.S. Attorneys were asked to resign. On February 16, 2021, Bailey announced his resignation effective February 28, 2021.

== Personal life ==
Bailey is married to Arizona Court of Appeals Judge Cynthia Bailey.
