= Gary M. Restaino =

American lawyer (born 1968)

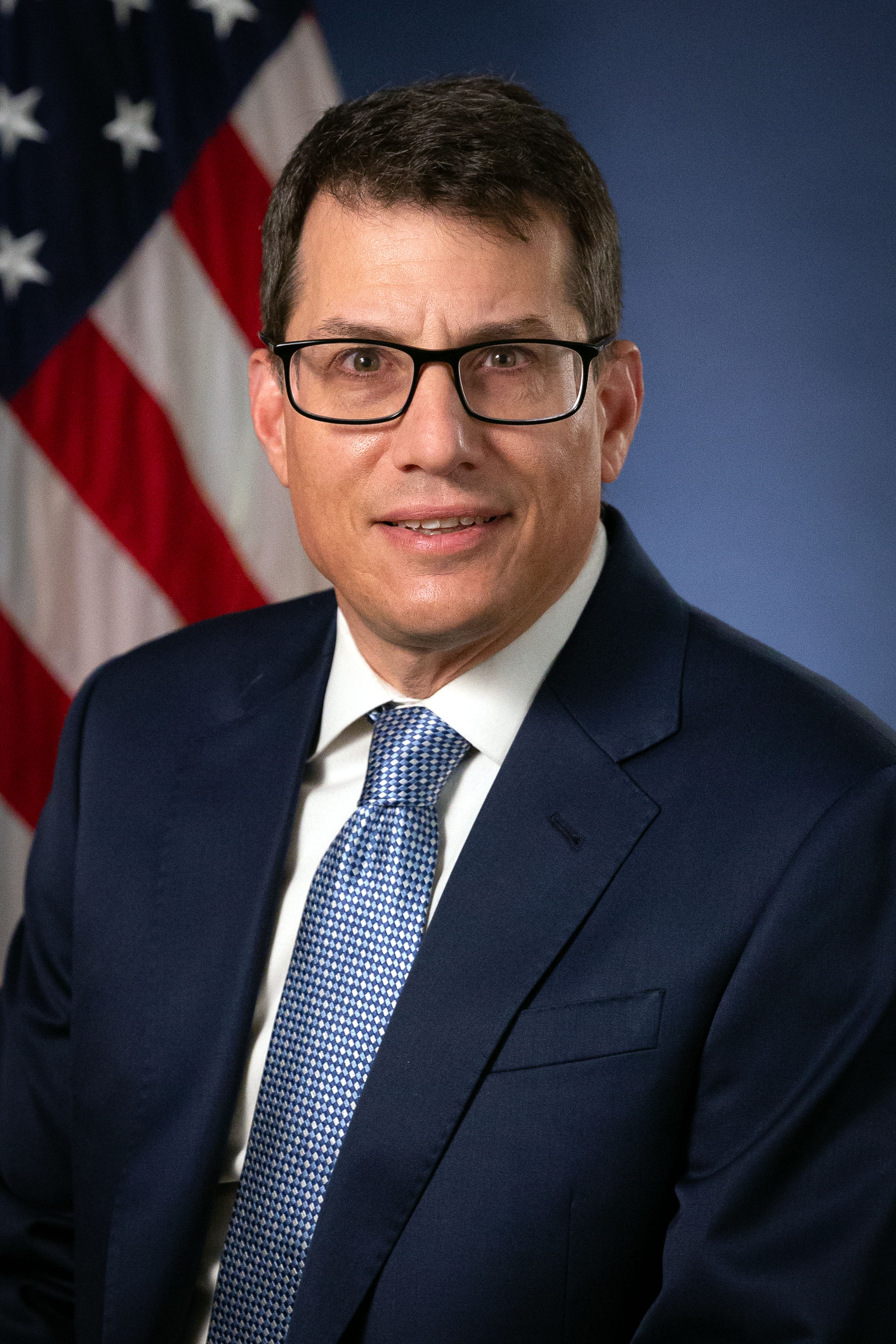
- Official portrait, 2021

United States Attorney for the District of Arizona
- In office November 23, 2021 – February 17, 2025
- President: Joe Biden; Donald Trump
- Preceded by: Michael G. Bailey
- Succeeded by: Rachel C. Hernandez (acting)

Acting United States Attorney General
- In office January 20, 2025
- President: Donald Trump
- Deputy: Emil Bove (acting)
- Preceded by: Lisa Monaco (acting)
- Succeeded by: James McHenry (acting)

Acting Director of Bureau of Alcohol, Tobacco, Firearms and Explosives
- In office April 25, 2022 – July 13, 2022
- President: Joe Biden
- Preceded by: Marvin G. Richardson (acting)
- Succeeded by: Steve Dettelbach

Personal details
- Born: Gary Michael Restaino; 1968 (age 57–58) Edison, New Jersey, U.S.
- Education: Haverford College (BA); University of Virginia (JD)

Gary Michael Restaino (born 1968) is an American lawyer who served as United States attorney for the District of Arizona from 2021 to 2025 and as acting director of the Bureau of Alcohol, Tobacco, Firearms, and Explosives (ATF) from April 25 to July 13, 2022. Restaino also served as acting United States Attorney General in his capacity as United States Attorney for the District of Arizona, pursuant to Executive Order 14136 titled "Providing an Order of Succession Within the Department of Justice" that was signed by President Joe Biden on January 3, 2025 and published in the Federal Register on January 13, 2025, for a few hours following the resignation of Merrick Garland as United States Attorney General at noon on January 20, 2025 and the subsequent resignation of Lisa Monaco as acting United States Attorney General a couple of hours after the resignation of Garland as United States Attorney General. President Donald Trump signed an executive order naming DOJ Chief Administrative Hearing Officer James McHenry as acting United States Attorney General later in the day on January 20, 2025.

== Education ==
Restaino earned a Bachelor of Arts degree from Haverford College in 1990 and a Juris Doctor from the University of Virginia School of Law in 1996.

== Career ==
From 1991 to 1993, Restaino served in Paraguay with the Peace Corps. From 1996 to 1999, he provided legal services to seasonal farm workers as a lawyer with Community Legal Services. From 1999 to 2003, he served as a civil rights lawyer in the Arizona Attorney General's Office. He then served as a trial attorney in the Public Integrity Section of the United States Department of Justice. Restaino joined the United States Attorney's Office for the District of Arizona in 2003. He was nominated to serve as United States attorney in October 2021. On November 19, 2021, his nomination was confirmed in the United States Senate by voice vote. He was sworn into office on November 23, 2021, by Chief Judge G. Murray Snow. He was dismissed from his role on February 17, 2025.

Government offices
Preceded by Marvin G. Richardson; Acting	Director of the Bureau of Alcohol, Tobacco, Firearms and Explosives; Acting; 2022	Succeeded by Steve Dettelbach
Legal offices
Preceded by Lisa Monaco; Acting	United States Attorney General; Acting; 2025	Succeeded by James McHenry; Acting
Preceded by Michael G. Bailey	United States Attorney for the District of Arizona; 2021–2025	Succeeded by Rachel C. Hernandez; Acting
