= Kriss Kross =

Kriss Kross may refer to:

- Kris Kross, an early 1990s rap/hip hop duo best known for their 1992 hit song "Jump"
- A variation of a Fill-In word puzzle
- "Kriss Kross" (song), a 2008 single by multinational band Guillemots

== See also ==
- Chris Cross (disambiguation)
