= Carole Rendon =

American lawyer

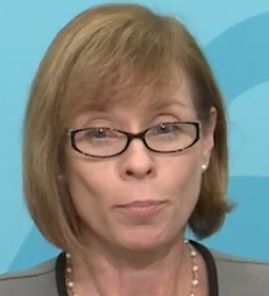

United States Attorney for the Northern District of Ohio
- In office July 15, 2016 – March 10, 2017
- President: Barack Obama; Donald Trump
- Preceded by: Steve Dettelbach
- Succeeded by: Justin Herdman

Personal details
- Born: November 8, 1962 (age 62) Cleveland, Ohio, U.S.
- Political party: Democratic
- Education: Northwestern University (BA, JD)

Carole Schwartz Rendon (born November 8, 1962) is an American attorney who served as the United States Attorney for the Northern District of Ohio from 2016 to 2017.

== Early life and education ==
Rendon was born on November 8, 1962, in Cleveland, Ohio. After graduating from Mayfield High School, Rendon entered Northwestern University as a theater major but opted to pursue political science instead. She received her Bachelor of Arts, summa cum laude, from Northwestern University in 1984 and her Juris Doctor cum laude from Northwestern University Pritzker School of Law in 1987.

== Legal career ==
Rendon began her legal career as a law clerk to Judge Joel Flaum on the United States Court of Appeals for the Seventh Circuit from 1987 to 1988. She served in the United States Attorney's Office for the District of Massachusetts as the Organized Crime Drug Enforcement Task Force Chief from 1994 to 1997 and as an Assistant United States Attorney in the Organized Crime Strike Force from 1988 to 1994. From 1997 to 1998 she was counsel in the firm of Epstein, Becker & Green, P.C.

She was a partner in the law firms of Giffen & Kaminski, LLC from 2007 to 2009; Kushner & Rendon, L.P.A. from 2003 to 2007; and Messerman & Messerman, Co., L.P.A. from 1998 to 2003.

== United States Attorney ==
She joined the office of the United States Attorney in 2009, where she served as the First Assistant United States Attorney from 2010 to 2016 after first briefly serving as Executive Assistant United States Attorney from 2009 to 2010. She served as Acting United States Attorney for the Northern District of Ohio since February 2016.

She was nominated to be the U.S. Attorney by President Barack Obama on May 18, 2016. Her nomination was reported by the United States Senate Committee on the Judiciary on June 30, 2016. Her nomination was confirmed on July 12, 2016. She was sworn into office on July 15, 2016.

In March 2017 she was asked to resign by Attorney General Jeff Sessions. After she departed from the Justice Department, Rendon joined the law firm BakerHostetler.

== Community service ==
Rendon is an active member of the community and has served on the board at Park Synagogue and numerous other boards in the legal community. She is a tutor in the Cleveland Metropolitan School District and is also involved in the Cleveland Metropolitan Bar Association's 3Rs program which teaches high school students about rights, responsibilities, and realities.

== Personal life ==
Rendon is married to her husband Michael, who is also an attorney. Together they have 3 children.

== See also ==
- 2017 dismissal of U.S. attorneys
