= Central Registration and Identification Scheme =

UK's national register of caravans

CRiS
- Central Registration and Identification Scheme
- Formation: 1992
- Type: Touring caravan registrar
- Region served: United Kingdom
- Parent organization: National Caravan Council
- Website: www.cris.co.uk

The Central Registration and Identification Scheme (CRiS) is the UK's national register of caravans.

== History ==
CRiS was launched in 1992 by the National Caravan Council (NCC) in conjunction with Hire Purchase Information (HPI) in an effort to prevent caravan theft.

== Operation ==
Since launch, all NCC member caravan manufacturers assign each new caravan a 17-digit Vehicle Identification Number (VIN) with the number etched into the side windows of the vehicle, and stamped into the chassis. Upon purchasing a new caravan, the dealership registers the caravan with CRiS and the owner is provided with a Touring Caravan Registration Document which details the make and model of the caravan along with its VIN. It is also possible to register caravans built before 1992 retrospectively with CRiS. The CRiS registration can be checked when purchasing a second-hand caravan to verify the caravan is not stolen and also has no outstanding finance or been written-off.

All UK touring caravans manufactured after 2016 by NCC members are also fitted with VIN Chip, a forensic security marking system comprising an RFID tag hidden inside the vehicle that can be read by law enforcement using a scanner, tamper-evident window lozenges bearing the vehicle's VIN, and scannable QR code stickers. Each VIN Chip registration is recorded on the CRiS database.

Unlike the V5C registration document used by the DVLA for registering motor vehicles, it is not a legal requirement to hold a CRiS registration for a caravan; however, most insurers require a CRiS registration document in order to provide cover.

== VIN encoding ==
The assigned VIN number, whilst being unique to each vehicle, also encodes certain information about the vehicle. For example, the VIN SGBS000BYA1234567 can be broken down as follows:

CRiS VIN number encoding
	S	G	B	S	0	0	0	B	Y	A	1	2	3	4	5	6	7
Meaning	Country of manufacturer		Make of caravan	Number of axles	Optional data			Manufacturer		Year of manufacture	Caravan serial number						
Example value	UK		Bailey	S: Single, T: Twin	Typically the caravan model			Bailey		A: 2010	1234567						

Where manufacturer codes are defined as follows:

Code	Manufacturer
AB	ABI
AD	Adria
AV	Avondale
BE	Bessacarr
BY	Bailey
CL	Carlight
CM	Coachman
CP	Compass
CS	Cosalt
CU	Sprite
EL	Elddis
EX	Explorer Group
FL	Fleetwood
LU	Lunar
SW	Swift Group

and where year of build codes are defined as:

- Letters N to Y denoting each year from 1992 to 2000 respectively
- Numbers 1 to 9 denoting each year from 2001 to 2009 respectively
- Letters A to M denoting each year from 2010 to 2021 respectively

After 2021, the letters roll over back to N, and thus N-Y denote each year from 2022 to 2030.
