= Criss-cross =

Criss Cross and variants thereof may refer to:

== Music ==
- Criss Cross Jazz, a jazz label
- Criss-Cross, a 1962 jazz album by Thelonious Monk
- "Criss Cross", a song by The Rolling Stones from the 2020 deluxe edition of Goats Head Soup
- Kris Kross, American hip hop duo

== Visual media ==
- Criss Cross (musical), a 1926 musical comedy with music by Jerome Kern
- Criss Cross (film), a 1949 film starring Burt Lancaster
- CrissCross (film), a 1992 film starring Goldie Hawn
- Chris Cross (TV series), a 1993 UK television comedy series
- Criss Cross, a 2001 film sequel to the television series Tropical Heat
- Crisscross (film), a 2018 Indian Bengali-language film directed by Birsa Dasgupta
- Crisscross, the shape more correctly known as:
  - Greek cross
  - Crossbuck

== Literature ==
- Criss Cross (novel), a novel by Lynne Rae Perkins, recipient of the 2006 Newbery Medal
- CRISSCROSS (novel), a 2004 Repairman Jack novel by F. Paul Wilson

== Science, technology, and engineering ==
- Level crossings can be colloquially referred to "criss-crosses"
- Criss-cross algorithm, a basis-exchange pivoting algorithm for linear programming (and more general problems in mathematical optimization)

== Other uses ==
- Criss-Cross (art cooperative), artist's cooperative that formed in Colorado in the early 1970s
- Criss Cross (New Kent, Virginia), a registered historic place in New Kent County, Virginia
- Crisscross applesauce, a style of sitting, also known as Tailor or Indian style, see Sitting#Positions
- Criss-cross squeeze, a squeeze play in bridge

== See also ==
- Kris Kross, an American rap duo
- Chris Cross (disambiguation)
