= Fannie Criss =

African-American designer

- Born: October 15, 1867; Cumberland County, Virginia, U.S.
- Died: February 2, 1942 (aged 74); New York, U.S.
- Occupation: Dressmaker

Fannie Criss (October 15, 1867 — February 2, 1942) was a late 19th-century and 20th-century African-American designer who specialized in hand-made dresses and gowns for elite patrons in Richmond, Virginia and New York City.

== Early life ==
Fannie Criss was born free in 1866 in Cumberland County, Virginia, to Samuel and Adeline Criss, who were formerly enslaved. She was one of the couple's seven children and their first child born after they had attained their freedom. The family later moved to Richmond, where Criss listed herself as a dressmaker in the classified business section of the city directory; of the 132 women listed as dressmakers in 1902, 112 were white and 20 were Black.

== Career ==
Criss learned the art of dressmaking from her mother and later passed on her skills by offering a program in the Richmond area for young women to develop their sewing skills. She started as a seamstress who traveled home to home, as many did. Criss became the city's most celebrated designer in the early 1900s, charging up to $200 for her elegant, handmade dresses.

With the help of her housekeeper and two or three young women, Criss designed dresses for the white elite in Richmond. Criss was well respected by her patrons and was well known for her beautifully designed wedding gowns. Criss's elite client list was made up of New York's most respected families. The second day dress, designed by Criss in 1896 and worn in the Richmond high society wedding of Miss Ellen Clark to Mr. Gordon Wallace, was donated to the Valentine Museum in Richmond, which has the second largest collection of period costumes in the United States.

During Criss' rise in notoriety, she adopted the professional title 'modiste,' which established and solidified her as an African American creative professional, during a time in which legislation provided barriers for progressing Black businesses.

A wool two-part dress of Criss's was featured at the "Pretty Powerful: Fashion and Virginia Women" exhibit in Richmond, Virginia, from May 2018 until January 2019.

=== Notable clients ===
Maggie L. Walker, the first Black woman bank founder and president of St. Luke's Penny Thrift Saving Bank, was a neighbor on West Leigh Street in Richmond and became one of Criss's many wealthy clients. Outside of a professional client relationship, Walker openly and actively supported Criss' work and openly critiqued the lack of communal support among Black entrepreneurs at the time.

Gloria Swanson, who was once the highest paid actress in Hollywood, was one of her more prominent clients.

Criss was neighbors with Sara Breedlove Walker, better known as Madam C. J. Walker, with whom she also enjoyed a close friendship. Criss also designed dresses for Walker's daughter A'Lelia Bundles.

== Personal life ==
Criss married William Thornton Payne in 1895 and purchased a home on West Leigh Street, located in an affluent area in Richmond. Criss operated her dressmaking business from this location, although she often took trips to the fashion hub of New York to acquire luxury materials and contemporary patterns. According to the 1900 and 1920 Federal Censuses, Criss and Payne are placed at 1012 West Leigh Street and 106 East Leigh Street, respectively. This is important to note because homes built on this street were considered highly sough after by Black professionals.

Criss's marriage to Payne did not last long and she later married William White and the couple relocated to New York City around 1918, acquiring a brownstone townhouse in the Harlem neighborhood at 219 West 137th Street.

Criss continued to operate her dressmaking business from this location, which thrived as she began to design for wealthy black women, Broadway stars and movie actresses. Criss's flamboyant and free spirited personality made her home in New York "which was filled with nice furniture and lots of silver and pretty things" a haven for the city's most influential Blacks.

Fannie Criss died on February 2, 1942, at the age of 76 in New York.
