= Hostile Action Service Medal =

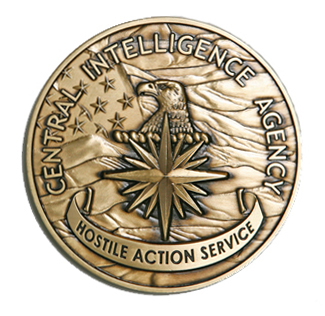
- Awarded for: "For direct exposure to a specific life-threatening incident in the foreign field or in the U.S. where the employee was in close proximity to death or injury, but survived and sustained no injuries. The incident must have occurred during work-related activities or events, which were targeted by armed forces or persons unfriendly to the U.S. Government."
- Country: United States of America
- Presented by: Central Intelligence Agency
- Eligibility: Employees of the Central Intelligence Agency

Precedence
- Next (higher): Exceptional Service Medal
- Next (lower): Agency Seal Medal
- Related: Combat Action Ribbon, Combat Action Badge

The Hostile Action Service Medal is awarded by the Central Intelligence Agency for direct exposure to a specific life-threatening incident in the foreign field or in the U.S. where the employee was in close proximity to death or injury, but survived and sustained no injuries. The incident must have occurred during work-related activities or events, which were targeted by armed forces or persons unfriendly to the U.S. Government.

== See also ==
- Awards and decorations of the United States government
