= James McHenry (lawyer) =

American lawyer and government official

Acting United States Attorney General
- In office January 20, 2025 – February 5, 2025
- President: Donald Trump
- Deputy: Emil Bove (acting)
- Preceded by: Gary M. Restaino (acting)
- Succeeded by: Pam Bondi

Personal details
- Born: James Ridley McHenry III
- Party: Republican
- Education: Georgetown University (BS); Vanderbilt University (MA, JD)

James Ridley McHenry III is an American lawyer who is the chief administrative hearing officer in the United States Department of Justice. He served as acting United States Attorney General from January 20 to February 5, 2025. He was appointed by President Donald Trump to temporarily fill the spot until Trump's nominee, Pam Bondi, was confirmed by the U.S. Senate.

== Education and career ==
McHenry earned a BS from the Georgetown University School of Foreign Service, and both a JD and MA in political science from Vanderbilt University.

He started at the U.S. Department of Justice in 2003, serving as a judicial law clerk and later attorney advisor at the Executive Office for Immigration Review (EOIR). He then was a senior lawyer in Immigration and Customs Enforcement, and served a detail as a special assistant U.S. attorney for the Criminal Division in the Northern District of Georgia. During 2014–2016, he was an administrative law judge in the Social Security Administration.

During the first Trump administration, McHenry was director of EOIR, first on an acting basis starting in 2017, and then permanently the following year. He was involuntarily reassigned to the position of EOIR's chief administrative hearing officer in January 2021, at the beginning of the Biden administration. In the second Trump administration, after Pam Bondi was confirmed, he served as an Associate Deputy Attorney General in the Office of the Deputy Attorney General. After Emil Bove was confirmed as a judge on the Third Circuit Court of Appeals he became the Acting Principal Associate Deputy Attorney General (PADAG) under Deputy Attorney General Todd Blanche. When Blanche became Acting Attorney General in April 2026, he became Blanche's Chief of Staff.

Legal offices
Preceded by Gary M. Restaino; Acting	United States Attorney General; Acting; 2025	Succeeded by Pam Bondi
