= Cris Ortega =

Spanish painter, writer, and comics artist

- Born: 1980 (age 45–46); Valladolid, Spain
- Occupations: Painter, writer, comics artist
- Notable work: Forgotten
- Website: crisortega.com

Cris Ortega (born 1980) is a Spanish painter, writer, and comics artist. Her style is a mixture of realism and manga, a somewhat dark semi-realism. Forgotten, one of her principal works, combines gothic and romantic elements, as well as a mixture of horror and fantasy.

== Biography ==
Cris Ortega became interested in art and literature in childhood, specifically in the horror genre. In 1999 she created her first comic from a story she had written several years before.

She entered the higher technical degree program in illustration at the Art School of Valladolid. While attending, she began to publish in local and foreign magazines. At that time she also worked as a drawing teacher and presented her works at various exhibitions and art galleries. At the end of her studies, Ortega worked for the first time as an art director for an advertising agency named Sm2, while continuing with illustration. She devoted all her free time to creating book covers and publishing the comic book anthology Shade. During those years she worked in graphic design, advertising, figurine design, role-playing games, video games, and comics. Always anchored in the world of fantasy and terror, she was also clearly influenced by manga. The influence of anime can also be seen in her illustrations.

In 2005, she began working as an illustrator for Norma Editorial, remaining with them for a year and a half. She then published her first series of collections of images associated with stories, including Forgotten. In 2007, the first volume of Forgotten was published in Spain. It would subsequently be translated into several languages, such as French, English, Italian, and German. Forgotten consists of four stories that combine Gothic and romantic elements.

== Works ==
=== Books ===
- Forgotten 1: El Reino sin nombre, Norma, 2007; containing: "El alma de la araña", "Rosa salvaje", "La caja de música", and "El canto de Lorelei", ISBN 9788498470857
- Forgotten 2: El portal de los destinos, Norma, 2008; containing: "Melodía espectral", "El grito de la Banshee", "Cartas en la oscuridad", and "La Rosa de los Vientos", ISBN 9788498475241
- Forgotten 3: Las Colinas del Silencio, Norma, 2010; containing: "El Cortejo de las Ánimas", "Cuando llegue diciembre", "La alianza de coral", and "El manantial de la luna", ISBN 9788467902020
- Nocturna, Imagica, 2011, ISBN 9788415238058
- Reflejos, compilation, 2014, ISBN 9781492739043

=== Collaborations ===
- Exotique, Ballistic Publishing, 2005
- In Dark Alleys, (Brian St. Claire-King), Vajra Entreprises, 2006
- Exotique 2, Ballistic Publishing, 2006
- Shade, (Lia Fiengo, Cris Ortega, Studio Kawaii, Hokane, Van Duran, Maria Abagnale, Ruui Eyvm), 2005
- Spectrum 14, Underwood Books, 2007
- Solidary King Kong, Scfiworld, 2008
- Exotique4, Ballistic Publishing, 2008
- Ecos de Azurëa volume 1, (Manuel F. Bueno), Mundos Épicos, 2009
- Exotique 5, Ballistic Publishing, 2009
- Spectrum 16, Underwood Books, 2009
- Woman in the shadow, 2009
- Drakaina Masters, SPQP artbook, 2010
- Art Squared digital painters 2, Rage Publishing, 2010
- Vampires The illustrated world of darkness, Norma, 2010
- Spectrum 18, Underwood Books, 2011
- Exotique 7, (Mario Wisibono), Ballistic Publishing, 2011
- Donde los árboles cantan (Laura Gallego), SM, 2011
- Chopper 1, (Martin Chapiro, Juan Ferreyra) Asylum Press, 2011
- TBO 4 Japon, Dibbuks, 2011
- D'artiste character design, Ballistic Publishing, 2011
- Allia 6, 2011
- Crónicas de sombras. Los elegidos, novel by Lucía González Lavado; illustrations by Cris Ortega, 2012
