= Chris Cross (disambiguation) =

Chris Cross (1952–2024) was an English musician, best known as the bass guitarist in the new wave band Ultravox.

Chris Cross may also refer to:

- Chris Cross (magician) (born 1989), comedy contortionist, magician and escapologist
- ChrisCross, American comic book artist
- Chris Cross (TV series), a 1993 UK television comedy series
- "Chris Cross" (Family Guy), an episode of Family Guy

== See also ==
- Kris Kross, American hip hop duo
- Kris Kross Amsterdam, a Dutch trio of DJs and record producers
- Criss-cross (disambiguation)
- Christopher Cross (disambiguation)
