= Krish =

Krish or Krrish may refer to:

- Krish, an alternate name for Krishna
- Krish (singer), Indian singer
- Krish Jagarlamudi, Indian film director
- Krish (Tamil director), Indian film director in Tamil cinema
- John Krish (1923–2016), British film director
- Krrish (franchise), Indian media franchise centred on a series of science fiction films
  - Krrish (character), fictional Indian superhero, titular character of the franchise
  - Koi... Mil Gaya, 2003 Indian Hindi-language film by Rakesh Roshan, first film in the series
  - Krrish, 2006 Indian Hindi-language science-fiction film by Rakesh Roshan, sequel to the 2003 film
  - Krrish 3, 2013 Indian Hindi-language film, sequel to the 2006 film, third film in the series
  - Krrish 4, 2027 Indian Hindi-language film, sequel to the 2013 film, fourth film in the series
  - Kid Krrish, 2013 Indian superhero animated film
- Krrish S. Kumar (born 1989), Indian actor

== See also ==
- Kris (disambiguation)
- Krishna (disambiguation)
