= John S. Leonardo =

Former United States Attorney

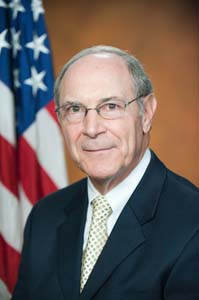

United States Attorney for the District of Arizona
- In office 2012 – January 20, 2017
- Appointed by: Barack Obama
- Preceded by: Dennis K. Burke
- Succeeded by: Elizabeth A. Strange (acting); Michael G. Bailey

Personal details
- Education: University of Notre Dame; George Washington University Law School

John S. Leonardo is a former United States Attorney for the District of Arizona.

== Early life and education ==
Born in Des Moines, Iowa, Leonardo graduated from Dowling High School in 1965. He received a BA degree from the University of Notre Dame in 1969 and a JD from the George Washington University Law School in 1972.

== Career ==
After law school, Leonardo became an assistant U.S. attorney for the Northern District of Indiana from 1973 to 1982 and later for the District of Arizona from 1982 to 1993 before resigning to become a Pima County Superior Court judge. He served on the Superior Court from 1993 until his retirement in February 2012. He was appointed by President Obama as United States Attorney for the District of Arizona in July 2012. He resigned this position in January 2017. In October 2017 he was appointed as an International Observer to the E.U. sponsored justice reform initiative in Tirana, Albania, with the diplomatic status of Attache to the U.S. Ambassador. He held this position until December 2019.
