= Kriss Sheridan =

American singer

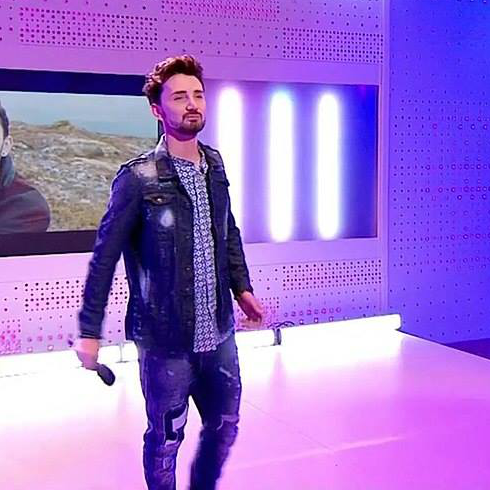
- Kriss Sheridan in 2017

Background information
- Born: Kriss Sheridan; 15 April 1989 (age 37); Bielsko-Biała, Poland
- Genres: Pop
- Occupations: Singer, songwriter, actor, model
- Years active: 2012–present
- Labels: Sheridan Records Ltd., RegioRecords/distr. Universal Music

Kriss Sheridan (born 15 April 1989) is a Polish-American singer, songwriter, actor, model and traveler.

== Early life ==
Kriss Sheridan is a son of a US American father and a Polish mother, as well as a German citizen. He studied in Munich, Madrid and New York City, thereafter working with several television and radio stations, such as RTL Television, ProSiebenSat.1 Media, Televisión Española, RFO Television and Radio Bayernwelle in Munich and Madrid. Sheridan was admitted to the Lee Strasberg Theatre and Film Institute in New York City while also working as a model.

== Career ==
His debut single "Happy" came out in March 2017, released by Universal Music. The single peaked at Number-1 on the Polish Music Charts. The music video was shot in Norway and broadcast on MTV and VIVA TV throughout all of Europe and America.

On 6 July 2017, Sheridan performed on Polish Television TVP Polonia to welcome US President Donald Trump on his visit to Poland.

Currently Sheridan is working together with world-class music producers and songwriters from USA, Sweden, France and the Netherlands, including the legendary Alan Roy Scott, who also writes songs for Celine Dion and Cyndi Lauper.

In March 2018, Sheridan released his second single "I Don't Wanna Say Goodbye", which peaked at Number-1 on the Polish Music Charts. The single was an international British-French-Swiss-US American-Polish production, created at a songwriting camp in Spain. The official music video was filmed near Warsaw, Poland and directed by Piotr Smoleński. The music video featured appearances by Agata Borowiak (model and the Miss Polonia 2017 finalist) and dancers from the Agustin Egurrola dance studio. In October 2018, Sheridan released his third single "Tomorrow". The single peaked at Number-1 on the Polish Music Charts.

== Discography ==
=== Singles ===
Year	Title	Peak chart positions						
Year	Title	CLP	LPRP	LPRR	LPRŁ	LPRB	ALP	RLP
2017	"Happy"	1	1	1	-	-	1	3
2018	"I Don't Wanna Say Goodbye"	1	1	1	1	1	x	-
2018	"Tomorrow"	1	-	1	-	1	x	-
"x" means that the chart list no longer exists.

=== Music videos ===
Year	Title	Director	Source
2017	"Happy"	Thomas Bulenda	
2018	"I Don't Wanna Say Goodbye"	Piotr Smoleński	
2018	"Tomorrow"	Piotr Smoleński	

=== Filmography ===
Year	Title	Director	Source
2012	Zettl	Helmut Dietl	
