= Cris (given name) =

Cris is a unisex given name, or a nickname for people with names such as Christopher, Cristiano, Christina or Cristina. Notable people with the given name or nickname Cris include:

- Cris (footballer, born 1977), Cristiano Marques Gomes, Brazilian football manager for Versailles and former centre-back
- Cris (footballer, born 1979), Cristiano Lima da Silva, Brazilian football defender
- Cris (footballer, born 1980), Cristiano Alves Pereira, Togolese football defender
- Cris (footballer, born 1984), Bruno Cristiano Conceição Carvalho Santos, Portuguese football midfielder
- Cris (footballer, born 1985), Ana Cristina da Silva, Brazilian women's football defender
- Cris (footballer, born 2002), Miriam Cristina Cavalcante, Brazilian women's football midfielder
- Cris Cab (born 1993), American singer and songwriter
- Cris Horwang (born 1980), Thai actress and model
- Cris Lora (born 2006), Spanish singer
- Cris Ortega (born 1980), Spanish artist and writer
