= Cannabinoid Research Initiative of Saskatchewan =

Canadian research team

- Formation: 2017
- Type: Affiliated organization of University of Saskatchewan
- Location: Saskatoon, Saskatchewan, Canada
- Services: Academic and applied research Cannabinoids; Medical Marijuana; Cannabis; Cannabidiol
- Website: research-groups.usask.ca/cris/index.php

The Cannabinoid Research Initiative of Saskatchewan (CRIS) was founded in 2017 as an interdisciplinary research team of clinician researchers (medical and veterinary), basic scientists, and social scientists. CRIS aims to obtain scientific evidence about the application of Cannabinoids and Medical cannabis to humans and animals, for health, disease and disorders. The team was initially based at the University of Saskatchewan, in Saskatoon, Saskatchewan, Canada but includes researchers based at the University of Regina and University of Alberta. A strategic management executive committee coordinates activities and develops research opportunities. The sections of CRIS include: Analytical Evaluations, Human Clinical Studies, Biomedical studies, Veterinary Sciences, Knowledge Translation and Studies of Cannabinoids and Society. CRIS members participate in the Canadian Consortium for the Investigation of Cannabinoids, and the International Cannabinoid Research Society.

The CARE-E clinical trial of a cannabis oil with high cannabidiol content with pediatric patients with refractory epilepsy was a key factor in initiating the research initiative. The CARE-E trial is a multi-center phase one trial that currently has open enrollment in five Canadian cities. The CARE-E trial received extensive media coverage when it was launched. The therapeutic effect of pure cannabidiol (Epidiolex GW Pharmaceuticals) on Dravet Syndrome was recently reported in the New England Journal of Medicine

The CRIS group has expanded to biomedical science studies of the pharmacology of cannabinoids and synthetic cannabinoids.

== Laboratories ==
- Drug Discovery Research Group -

(i) Determinants of neonatal exposure risk when breastfeeding mothers require medications.
(ii) Research into the health benefits of flaxseed lignans and their underlying mechanism(s) of action.

- Multiple Sclerosis Research - (i) Epidemiology and pharmacoepidemiology of MS.
- Clinical trials

(i) Clinical trials looking at cannabis in pediatric neurological disease.
(ii) Neuro-degenerative and neuro-metabolic disorders of childhood

- Type 1 cannabinoid receptor (CB1R) Pharmacology of the endocannabinoid system and the type 1 cannabinoid receptor (CB1R).
- Microbiome studies Project under development by the Links Lab
- Knowledge Translation Medication adherence, patient education and interprofessional education.
- Chronic Disease studies Use of interdisciplinary teams in chronic disease management, focusing on delivering diabetes care to immigrant and Aboriginal populations.

== See also ==
- Cannabidiol
- Charlotte's web (cannabis)
- Cannabis
- Cannabis (drug)
- Legal history of cannabis in Canada
