= Criss =

Criss is a given name and surname. Notable people with the name include:

== Given name ==
- Criss Angel (born 1967), American magician
- Criss Oliva (1963–1993), American musician

== Surname ==
- Anthony Criss (born 1970), American rapper and actor
- Charlie Criss (born 1948), American basketball player
- Clair Carlton Criss (1879–1952), American businessman who developed what became Mutual of Omaha
- Crissy Criss (born 1987), British radio presenter
- Darren Criss (born 1987), American actor and singer
- Dode Criss (1885–1955), American baseball player
- Fannie Criss (1866–1942), African-American fashion designer
- Francis Criss (1901–1973), American painter
- Nancy Criss (born 1960), American actress and film producer
- Peter Criss (born 1945), American musician
- Sonny Criss (1927–1977), American jazz musician

== See also ==
- Criss-cross (disambiguation)
- Romani CRISS
