= National Caravan Council =

- Formation: 1939
- Type: Trade body
- VAT ID no.: 00519228
- Headquarters: Aldershot, Hampshire
- Location: United Kingdom
- Region served: United Kingdom
- Board of directors: John Lally; Anthony Trevelyan; Michael Wills; Alicia Dunne; Anthony Eltherington; Ian Martin
- Staff: 15
- Website: www.thencc.org.uk

The National Caravan Council is a trade body in the United Kingdom which represents members in the caravan, motorhome, caravan holiday home and park home sectors. It was founded in 1939.
