= Kriss (surname) =

Kriss is a surname. Notable people with the surname include:

- Eric Kriss (born 1949), a musician, writer and business executive
- Grigory Kriss (born 1940), a Soviet épée fencer

== See also ==
- Kriss (disambiguation)
