= United States Attorney General =

Head of the US Department of Justice

- Seal of the Department of Justice

- Flag of the attorney general

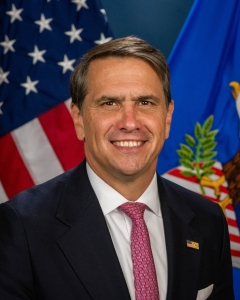
- Incumbent; Todd Blanche since April 2, 2026 (Note: Acting: April 2, 2026 – August 10, 2026)
- United States Department of Justice
- Style: Mr. Attorney General (informal); The Honorable (formal)
- Member of: Cabinet; National Security Council; Homeland Security Council
- Reports to: President of the United States
- Seat: Robert F. Kennedy Department of Justice Building, Washington, D.C.
- Appointer: The president; with advice and consent of the Senate
- Term length: No fixed term
- Constituting instrument: 28 U.S.C. § 503
- Formation: September 26, 1789
- First holder: Edmund Randolph
- Succession: Seventh
- Deputy: Deputy Attorney General
- Salary: Executive Schedule, Level I
- Website: www.justice.gov/ag

The United States attorney general (AG) is the head of the United States Department of Justice (DOJ) and serves as the chief law enforcement officer of the federal government. The attorney general acts as the principal legal advisor to the president of the United States on all legal matters. The attorney general is also a statutory member of the Cabinet of the United States and a member of the United States National Security Council. Additionally, the attorney general is seventh in the presidential line of succession. The attorney general is the only cabinet department head who is not given the title Secretary.

Under the Appointments Clause of the United States Constitution, the officeholder is nominated by the president of the United States, and, following a confirmation hearing before the Senate Judiciary Committee, will take office if confirmed by the majority of the full United States Senate. The attorney general is supported by the Office of the Attorney General, which includes executive staff and several deputy attorneys general.

The attorney general is a Level I position in the Executive Schedule and thus earns the salary prescribed for that level: $250,600, as of January 2025.

== Name ==
The title Attorney General is an example of a noun (attorney) followed by a postpositive adjective (general). "General" is a description of the type of attorney, not a title or rank in itself (as it would be in the military). Even though the attorney general (and the similarly titled solicitor general) is occasionally referred to as "General" or "General [last name]" by senior government officials, this is considered incorrect in standard American English usage. For the same reason, the correct American English plural form is "attorneys general" rather than "attorney generals".

== History ==
Congress passed the Judiciary Act of 1789 which, among other things, established the Office of the Attorney General. The original duties of this officer were "to prosecute and conduct all suits in the Supreme Court in which the United States shall be concerned, and to give his advice and opinion upon questions of law when required by the president of the United States, or when requested by the heads of any of the departments". Some of these duties have since been transferred to the United States solicitor general and the White House counsel.

The Department of Justice was established in 1870 to support the attorneys general in the discharge of their responsibilities. In 1841 the first volume of The Official Opinions of the Attorneys General of the United States was printed on the authorization of Congress and contained the legal justifications of the President's official actions.

The secretary of state, the secretary of the treasury, the secretary of defense, and the attorney general are regarded as the four most important Cabinet officials in the United States because of the size and importance of their respective departments.

== Duties and responsibilities ==
The attorney general's duties and responsibilities as the chief law enforcement officer of the federal government include overseeing the United States Department of Justice, enforcing federal laws, and providing both formal and informal legal advice and opinions to the president of the United States, the cabinet, and the heads of executive departments and agencies. The attorney general represents the federal government in legal matters and supervises the administration and operation of the Department of Justice, which includes the Federal Bureau of Investigation, the Drug Enforcement Administration, the Bureau of Alcohol, Tobacco, Firearms and Explosives, the Office of Justice Programs, U.S. attorneys, and the United States Marshals Service.

Additionally, the attorney general advises the president of the United States on appointments to federal judicial positions and Department of Justice roles, including U.S. Attorneys and U.S. Marshals. While the attorney general may represent the United States in the Supreme Court and other courts, this is typically handled by the solicitor general. The attorney general also performs or supervises other duties as required by statute or executive order.

== Presidential transition ==
It is the practice for the attorney general, along with the other Cabinet secretaries and high-level political appointees of the president, to tender a resignation with effect at noon on the Inauguration Day (January 20) of a new president. The deputy attorney general is also expected to tender a resignation, but is commonly requested to stay on and act as the attorney general, pursuant to 28 U.S.C. § 508, pending the confirmation by the Senate of the new attorney general.

For example, upon the inauguration of President Donald Trump at noon on January 20, 2017, then-Attorney General Loretta Lynch left her position, so then-deputy attorney general Sally Yates, who had also tendered her resignation, was asked to stay on to serve as the acting attorney general, pursuant to 28 U.S.C. § 508, until the confirmation of the new attorney general Jeff Sessions, who had been nominated for the office in November 2016 by then-president-elect Donald Trump. (Note: Unusually for a transitional acting appointment, Yates was dismissed and replaced with another Acting Attorney General before Sessions was confirmed because she refused to defend an executive order of the incoming administration.)

== List of attorneys general ==
Key

Federalist (4) Democratic-Republican (5) Democratic (34) Whig (4) Republican (40)

Denotes acting capacity.

| No. | Portrait | Name | State of residence | Took office | Left office | President(s) |
|---|---|---|---|---|---|---|
| 1 | | Edmund Randolph | Virginia | September 26, 1789 | January 26, 1794 | George Washington (1789–1797) |
| 2 | | William Bradford | Pennsylvania | January 27, 1794 | August 23, 1795 | George Washington (1789–1797) |
| 3 | | Charles Lee | Virginia | December 10, 1795 | February 19, 1801 | George Washington (1789–1797) |
| 3 | | Charles Lee | Virginia | December 10, 1795 | February 19, 1801 | John Adams (1797–1801) |
| 4 | | Levi Lincoln Sr. | Massachusetts | March 5, 1801 | March 3, 1805 | Thomas Jefferson (1801–1809) |
| 5 | | John Breckinridge | Kentucky | August 7, 1805 | December 14, 1806 | Thomas Jefferson (1801–1809) |
| 6 | | Caesar Augustus Rodney | Delaware | January 20, 1807 | December 10, 1811 | Thomas Jefferson (1801–1809) |
| 6 | | Caesar Augustus Rodney | Delaware | January 20, 1807 | December 10, 1811 | James Madison (1809–1817) |
| 7 | | William Pinkney | Maryland | December 11, 1811 | February 9, 1814 | James Madison (1809–1817) |
| 8 | | Richard Rush | Pennsylvania | February 10, 1814 | November 12, 1817 | James Madison (1809–1817) |
| 9 | | William Wirt | Virginia | November 13, 1817 | March 4, 1829 | James Monroe (1817–1825) |
| 9 | | William Wirt | Virginia | November 13, 1817 | March 4, 1829 | John Quincy Adams (1825–1829) |
| 10 | | John Macpherson Berrien | Georgia | March 9, 1829 | July 19, 1831 | Andrew Jackson (1829–1837) |
| 11 | | Roger B. Taney | Maryland | July 20, 1831 | September 23, 1833 | Andrew Jackson (1829–1837) |
| 12 | | Benjamin Franklin Butler | New York | November 15, 1833 | July 4, 1838 | Andrew Jackson (1829–1837) |
| 12 | | Benjamin Franklin Butler | New York | November 15, 1833 | July 4, 1838 | Martin Van Buren (1837–1841) |
| 13 | | Felix Grundy | Tennessee | July 5, 1838 | January 10, 1840 | Martin Van Buren (1837–1841) |
| 14 | | Henry D. Gilpin | Pennsylvania | January 11, 1840 | March 4, 1841 | Martin Van Buren (1837–1841) |
| 15 | | John J. Crittenden; 1st term | Kentucky | March 5, 1841 | September 12, 1841 | William Henry Harrison (1841) |
| 15 | | John J. Crittenden; 1st term | Kentucky | March 5, 1841 | September 12, 1841 | John Tyler (1841–1845) |
| 16 | | Hugh S. Legaré | South Carolina | September 13, 1841 | June 20, 1843 | John Tyler (1841–1845) |
| 17 | | John Nelson | Maryland | July 1, 1843 | March 4, 1845 | John Tyler (1841–1845) |
| 18 | | John Y. Mason | Virginia | March 5, 1845 | October 16, 1846 | James K. Polk (1845–1849) |
| 19 | | Nathan Clifford | Maine | October 17, 1846 | March 17, 1848 | James K. Polk (1845–1849) |
| 20 | | Isaac Toucey | Connecticut | June 21, 1848 | March 4, 1849 | James K. Polk (1845–1849) |
| 21 | | Reverdy Johnson | Maryland | March 8, 1849 | July 21, 1850 | Zachary Taylor (1849–1850) |
| 22 | | John J. Crittenden; 2nd term | Kentucky | July 22, 1850 | March 4, 1853 | Millard Fillmore (1850–1853) |
| 23 | | Caleb Cushing | Massachusetts | March 7, 1853 | March 4, 1857 | Franklin Pierce (1853–1857) |
| 24 | | Jeremiah S. Black | Pennsylvania | March 6, 1857 | December 16, 1860 | James Buchanan (1857–1861) |
| 25 | | Edwin Stanton | Pennsylvania | December 20, 1860 | March 4, 1861 | James Buchanan (1857–1861) |
| 26 | | Edward Bates | Missouri | March 5, 1861 | November 24, 1864 | Abraham Lincoln (1861–1865) |
| 27 | | James Speed | Kentucky | December 2, 1864 | July 22, 1866 | Abraham Lincoln (1861–1865) |
| 27 | | James Speed | Kentucky | December 2, 1864 | July 22, 1866 | Andrew Johnson (1865–1869) |
| 28 | | Henry Stanbery | Ohio | July 23, 1866 | July 16, 1868 | Andrew Johnson (1865–1869) |
| 29 | | William M. Evarts | New York | July 17, 1868 | March 4, 1869 | Andrew Johnson (1865–1869) |
| 30 | | Ebenezer R. Hoar | Massachusetts | March 5, 1869 | November 22, 1870 | Ulysses S. Grant (1869–1877) |
| 31 | | Amos T. Akerman | Georgia | November 23, 1870 | December 13, 1871 | Ulysses S. Grant (1869–1877) |
| 32 | | George Henry Williams | Oregon | December 14, 1871 | April 25, 1875 | Ulysses S. Grant (1869–1877) |
| 33 | | Edwards Pierrepont | New York | April 26, 1875 | May 21, 1876 | Ulysses S. Grant (1869–1877) |
| 34 | | Alphonso Taft | Ohio | May 22, 1876 | March 4, 1877 | Ulysses S. Grant (1869–1877) |
| 35 | | Charles Devens | Massachusetts | March 12, 1877 | March 4, 1881 | Rutherford B. Hayes (1877–1881) |
| 36 | | Wayne MacVeagh | Pennsylvania | March 5, 1881 | December 15, 1881 | James A. Garfield (1881) |
| 36 | | Wayne MacVeagh | Pennsylvania | March 5, 1881 | December 15, 1881 | Chester A. Arthur (1881–1885) |
| 37 | | Benjamin H. Brewster | Pennsylvania | December 16, 1881 | March 4, 1885 | Chester A. Arthur (1881–1885) |
| 38 | | Augustus Garland | Arkansas | March 6, 1885 | March 4, 1889 | Grover Cleveland (1885–1889) |
| 39 | | William H. H. Miller | Indiana | March 7, 1889 | March 4, 1893 | Benjamin Harrison (1889–1893) |
| 40 | | Richard Olney | Massachusetts | March 6, 1893 | April 7, 1895 | Grover Cleveland (1893–1897) |
| 41 | | Judson Harmon | Ohio | April 8, 1895 | March 4, 1897 | Grover Cleveland (1893–1897) |
| 42 | | Joseph McKenna | California | March 5, 1897 | January 25, 1898 | William McKinley (1897–1901) |
| 43 | | John W. Griggs | New Jersey | January 25, 1898 | March 29, 1901 | William McKinley (1897–1901) |
| 44 | | Philander C. Knox | Pennsylvania | April 5, 1901 | June 30, 1904 | William McKinley (1897–1901) |
| 44 | | Philander C. Knox | Pennsylvania | April 5, 1901 | June 30, 1904 | Theodore Roosevelt (1901–1909) |
| 45 | | William Henry Moody | Massachusetts | July 1, 1904 | December 17, 1906 | Theodore Roosevelt (1901–1909) |
| 46 | | Charles Bonaparte | Maryland | December 17, 1906 | March 4, 1909 | Theodore Roosevelt (1901–1909) |
| 47 | | George W. Wickersham | New York | March 4, 1909 | March 4, 1913 | William Howard Taft (1909–1913) |
| 48 | | James McReynolds | Tennessee | March 5, 1913 | August 29, 1914 | Woodrow Wilson (1913–1921) |
| 49 | | Thomas Watt Gregory | Texas | August 29, 1914 | March 4, 1919 | Woodrow Wilson (1913–1921) |
| 50 | | A. Mitchell Palmer | Pennsylvania | March 5, 1919 | March 4, 1921 | Woodrow Wilson (1913–1921) |
| 51 | | Harry M. Daugherty | Ohio | March 4, 1921 | April 6, 1924 | Warren G. Harding (1921–1923) |
| 51 | | Harry M. Daugherty | Ohio | March 4, 1921 | April 6, 1924 | Calvin Coolidge (1923–1929) |
| 52 | | Harlan F. Stone | New York | April 7, 1924 | March 1, 1925 | Calvin Coolidge (1923–1929) |
| 53 | | John G. Sargent | Vermont | March 7, 1925 | March 4, 1929 | Calvin Coolidge (1923–1929) |
| 54 | | William D. Mitchell | Minnesota | March 4, 1929 | March 4, 1933 | Herbert Hoover (1929–1933) |
| 55 | | Homer Stille Cummings | Connecticut | March 4, 1933 | January 1, 1939 | Franklin D. Roosevelt (1933–1945) |
| 56 | | Frank Murphy | Michigan | January 2, 1939 | January 18, 1940 | Franklin D. Roosevelt (1933–1945) |
| 57 | | Robert H. Jackson | New York | January 18, 1940 | August 25, 1941 | Franklin D. Roosevelt (1933–1945) |
| 58 | | Francis Biddle | Pennsylvania | August 26, 1941 | June 26, 1945 | Franklin D. Roosevelt (1933–1945) |
| 59 | | Tom C. Clark | Texas | June 27, 1945 | July 26, 1949 | Harry S. Truman (1945–1953) |
| 60 | | J. Howard McGrath | Rhode Island | July 27, 1949 | April 3, 1952 | Harry S. Truman (1945–1953) |
| 61 | | James P. McGranery | Pennsylvania | April 4, 1952 | January 20, 1953 | Harry S. Truman (1945–1953) |
| 62 | | Herbert Brownell Jr. | New York | January 21, 1953 | October 23, 1957 | Dwight D. Eisenhower (1953–1961) |
| 63 | | William P. Rogers | New York | October 23, 1957 | January 20, 1961 | Dwight D. Eisenhower (1953–1961) |
| 64 | | Robert F. Kennedy | Massachusetts | January 20, 1961 | September 3, 1964 | John F. Kennedy (1961–1963) |
| 64 | | Robert F. Kennedy | Massachusetts | January 20, 1961 | September 3, 1964 | Lyndon B. Johnson (1963–1969) |
| 65 | | Nicholas Katzenbach | New Jersey | September 4, 1964 (Note: Served as acting attorney general in his capacity as deputy attorney general, pursuant to 28 U.S.C. § 508, until his own appointment and confirmation as attorney general.) | January 28, 1965 | Lyndon B. Johnson (1963–1969) |
| 65 | | Nicholas Katzenbach | New Jersey | January 28, 1965 | November 28, 1966 | Lyndon B. Johnson (1963–1969) |
| 66 | | Ramsey Clark | Texas | November 28, 1966 | March 10, 1967 | Lyndon B. Johnson (1963–1969) |
| 66 | | Ramsey Clark | Texas | March 10, 1967 | January 20, 1969 | Lyndon B. Johnson (1963–1969) |
| 67 | | John N. Mitchell | New York | January 20, 1969 | February 15, 1972 | Richard Nixon (1969–1974) |
| 68 | | Richard Kleindienst | Arizona | February 15, 1972 | April 30, 1973 | Richard Nixon (1969–1974) |
| 69 | | Elliot Richardson | Massachusetts | May 25, 1973 | October 20, 1973 | Richard Nixon (1969–1974) |
| – | | William Ruckelshaus (Note: Ruckelshaus served as acting attorney general in his capacity as deputy attorney general for a few hours following the resignation of Elliot Richardson as attorney general on October 20, 1973, pursuant to 28 U.S.C. § 508, until his own resignation after serving as acting attorney general for a few hours. Richardson’s and Ruckelshaus’ resignations both occurred during the "Saturday Night Massacre".); Acting | Indiana | October 20, 1973 | | Richard Nixon (1969–1974) |
| – | | Robert Bork (Note: On October 20, 1973, Solicitor General Robert Bork became acting attorney general following the "Saturday Night Massacre", in which Attorney General Elliot Richardson and Deputy Attorney General William Ruckelshaus, who succeeded Richardson as acting attorney general for a few hours, both resigned.); Acting | Washington, D.C. | October 20, 1973 | January 4, 1974 | Richard Nixon (1969–1974) |
| 70 | | William B. Saxbe | Ohio | January 4, 1974 | February 2, 1975 | Richard Nixon (1969–1974) |
| 70 | | William B. Saxbe | Ohio | January 4, 1974 | February 2, 1975 | Gerald Ford (1974–1977) |
| 71 | | Edward H. Levi | Illinois | February 2, 1975 | January 20, 1977 | Gerald Ford (1974–1977) |
| – | | Harold R. Tyler Jr. (Note: Tyler served as acting attorney general in his capacity as deputy attorney general for a few hours following the resignation of Edward H. Levi as attorney general at noon on January 20, 1977, pursuant to 28 U.S.C. § 508, until President Jimmy Carter named United States Assistant Attorney General for the DOJ Criminal Division Dick Thornburgh as acting attorney general later that day.); Acting | New York | January 20, 1977 | | Jimmy Carter (1977–1981) |
| – | | Dick Thornburgh (Note: Thornburgh served as acting attorney general in his capacity as United States Assistant Attorney General for the DOJ Criminal Division, until Griffin Bell assumed office as attorney general. Thornburgh later served as attorney general from 1988–1991.); Acting | Pennsylvania | January 20, 1977 | January 26, 1977 | Jimmy Carter (1977–1981) |
| 72 | | Griffin Bell | Georgia | January 26, 1977 | August 16, 1979 | Jimmy Carter (1977–1981) |
| 73 | | Benjamin Civiletti | Maryland | August 16, 1979 | January 19, 1981 | Jimmy Carter (1977–1981) |
| – | | Charles Byron Renfrew (Note: Renfrew served as deputy attorney general from February 27, 1980 until the end of the day on January 19, 1981 and as acting attorney general in his capacity as deputy attorney general, pursuant to 28 U.S.C. § 508, from the beginning of the day on January 20, 1981, following the resignation of Benjamin Civiletti as attorney general at the end of the day on January 19, 1981, until William French Smith assumed office as attorney general on January 23, 1981.); Acting | California | January 20, 1981 | January 23, 1981 | Ronald Reagan (1981–1989) |
| 74 | | William French Smith | California | January 23, 1981 | February 25, 1985 | Ronald Reagan (1981–1989) |
| 75 | | Edwin Meese | California | February 25, 1985 | August 12, 1988 | Ronald Reagan (1981–1989) |
| 76 | | Dick Thornburgh | Pennsylvania | August 12, 1988 | August 15, 1991 | Ronald Reagan (1981–1989) |
| 76 | | Dick Thornburgh | Pennsylvania | August 12, 1988 | August 15, 1991 | George H. W. Bush (1989–1993) |
| 77 | | William Barr; 1st term | Virginia | August 16, 1991 | November 26, 1991 | George H. W. Bush (1989–1993) |
| 77 | | William Barr; 1st term | Virginia | November 26, 1991 | January 20, 1993 | George H. W. Bush (1989–1993) |
| – | | George J. Terwilliger III (Note: Terwilliger served as acting attorney general in his capacity as deputy attorney general for a few hours following the resignation of William Barr as attorney general at noon on January 20, 1993, pursuant to 28 U.S.C. § 508, until President Bill Clinton named Assistant Attorney General for the DOJ Civil Division Stuart M. Gerson as acting attorney general later that day.); Acting | Vermont | January 20, 1993 | | Bill Clinton (1993–2001) |
| – | | Stuart M. Gerson (Note: Gerson served as acting attorney general in his capacity as Assistant Attorney General for the DOJ Civil Division. Gerson was fourth in the line of succession at the Justice Department, but other senior DOJ officials had already resigned. Janet Reno, President Clinton's nominee for attorney general, was confirmed on March 11, and he resigned when Reno was sworn in the next day.); Acting | Maryland | January 20, 1993 | March 12, 1993 | Bill Clinton (1993–2001) |
| 78 | | Janet Reno | Florida | March 12, 1993 | January 20, 2001 | Bill Clinton (1993–2001) |
| – | | Eric Holder (Note: Holder served as acting attorney general in his capacity as deputy attorney general following the resignation of Janet Reno as attorney general at noon on January 20, 2001, pursuant to 28 U.S.C. § 508, until John Ashcroft assumed office as attorney general on February 2, 2001. Holder later served as attorney general from 2009–2015.); Acting | Washington, D.C. | January 20, 2001 | February 2, 2001 | George W. Bush (2001–2009) |
| 79 | | John Ashcroft | Missouri | February 2, 2001 | February 3, 2005 | George W. Bush (2001–2009) |
| 80 | | Alberto Gonzales | Texas | February 3, 2005 | September 17, 2007 | George W. Bush (2001–2009) |
| – | | Paul Clement (Note: On August 27, 2007, President Bush named Solicitor General Paul Clement as the future acting attorney general, to take office upon the resignation of Alberto Gonzales, effective September 17, 2007. On September 17, President Bush announced that Assistant Attorney General for the DOJ Civil Division Peter Keisler would become acting attorney general, pending a permanent appointment of a presidential nominee. According to administration officials, Clement became acting attorney general at 12:01 am September 17, 2007, and left office 24 hours later. Keisler served as acting attorney general until the confirmation of Michael Mukasey on November 9, 2007.); Acting | Virginia | September 17, 2007 | September 18, 2007 | George W. Bush (2001–2009) |
| – | | Peter Keisler; Acting | Maryland | September 18, 2007 | November 9, 2007 | George W. Bush (2001–2009) |
| 81 | | Michael Mukasey | New York | November 9, 2007 | January 20, 2009 | George W. Bush (2001–2009) |
| – | | Mark Filip (Note: Filip served as acting attorney general in his capacity as deputy attorney general following the resignation of Michael Mukasey as attorney general at noon on January 20, 2009, pursuant to 28 U.S.C. § 508, until Eric Holder assumed office as attorney general on February 3, 2009.); Acting | Illinois | January 20, 2009 | February 3, 2009 | Barack Obama (2009–2017) |
| 82 | | Eric Holder | Washington, D.C. | February 3, 2009 | April 27, 2015 | Barack Obama (2009–2017) |
| 83 | | Loretta Lynch | New York | April 27, 2015 | January 20, 2017 | Barack Obama (2009–2017) |
| – | | Sally Yates (Note: Yates served as acting attorney general in her capacity as deputy attorney general following the resignation of Loretta Lynch as attorney general at noon on January 20, 2017, pursuant to 28 U.S.C. § 508, until she was fired on January 30, 2017, after saying the Department of Justice would not defend an executive order in court.); Acting | Georgia | January 20, 2017 | January 30, 2017 | Donald Trump (2017–2021) |
| – | | Channing D. Phillips (Note: Phillips served as acting attorney general in his capacity as United States Attorney for the District of Columbia for a few hours following the dismissal of Sally Yates on January 30, 2017 pursuant to Executive Order 13762 titled "Providing an Order of Succession Within the Department of Justice" that was signed by President Barack Obama on January 13, 2017 and published in the Federal Register on January 19, 2017. President Donald Trump signed an executive order naming United States Attorney for the Eastern District of Virginia Dana Boente as acting attorney general a few hours after the dismissal of Sally Yates and automatic succession of Phillips to the position of acting attorney general.); Acting | Washington, D.C. | January 30, 2017 | | Donald Trump (2017–2021) |
| – | | Dana Boente; Acting | Virginia | January 30, 2017 | February 9, 2017 | Donald Trump (2017–2021) |
| 84 | | Jeff Sessions | Alabama | February 9, 2017 | November 7, 2018 | Donald Trump (2017–2021) |
| – | | Rod Rosenstein (Note: Following the resignation of Jeff Sessions as attorney general at the request of President Donald Trump, Rosenstein served as acting attorney general in his capacity as deputy attorney general for a few hours on November 7, 2018, pursuant to 28 U.S.C. § 508, until Trump signed an executive order naming Matthew Whitaker as acting attorney general later that day.); Acting | Maryland | November 7, 2018 | | Donald Trump (2017–2021) |
| – | | Matthew Whitaker (Note: The legality of Matthew Whitaker's appointment as acting attorney general was called into question by several constitutional scholars. Among those included Neal Katyal and George T. Conway III, who asserted it is unconstitutional, because the Attorney General is a principal officer under the Appointments Clause, and thus requires senate consent, even in an acting capacity. Maryland filed an injunction against Whitaker's appointment on this basis. John E. Bies at Lawfare regarded it as an unresolved question. The DOJ Office of Legal Counsel released a legal opinion, asserting that the appointment was legal and consistent with past precedent.); Acting | Iowa | November 7, 2018 | February 14, 2019 | Donald Trump (2017–2021) |
| 85 | | William Barr; 2nd term | Virginia | February 14, 2019 | December 23, 2020 | Donald Trump (2017–2021) |
| – | | Jeffrey A. Rosen (Note: Rosen served as acting attorney general in his capacity as deputy attorney general beginning at the beginning of the day on December 24, 2020, following the resignation of William Barr as attorney general at the end of the day on December 23, 2020, pursuant to 28 U.S. Code § 508 - Vacancies.); Acting | Virginia | December 24, 2020 | January 20, 2021 | Donald Trump (2017–2021) |
| – | | John Demers (Note: Demers served as acting attorney general in his capacity as Assistant Attorney General for the DOJ National Security Division for a few hours following the resignation of Jeffrey Rosen as acting attorney general at noon on January 20, 2021 until President Joe Biden signed an executive order naming Deputy Assistant Attorney General for Human Resources and Administration Monty Wilkinson as acting attorney general later that day.); Acting | Virginia | January 20, 2021 | | Joe Biden (2021–2025) |
| – | | Monty Wilkinson; Acting | Washington, D.C. | January 20, 2021 | March 11, 2021 | Joe Biden (2021–2025) |
| 86 | | Merrick Garland | Maryland | March 11, 2021 | January 20, 2025 | Joe Biden (2021–2025) |
| – | | Lisa Monaco (Note: Monaco served as acting attorney general in her capacity as deputy attorney general for a couple of hours following the resignation of Merrick Garland at noon on January 20, 2025, pursuant to 28 U.S.C. § 508, until her own resignation after a couple of hours of serving as acting attorney general with Gary M. Restaino then serving as acting attorney general in his capacity as United States Attorney for the District of Arizona, pursuant to Executive Order 14136 titled "Providing an Order of Succession Within the Department of Justice" that was signed by President Joe Biden on January 3, 2025 and published in the Federal Register on January 13, 2025, for a few hours until President Donald Trump signed an executive order naming DOJ Chief Administrative Hearing Officer James McHenry as acting attorney general later in the day on January 20, 2025.); Acting | Washington, D.C. | January 20, 2025 | | Donald Trump (2025–present) |
| – | | Gary M. Restaino (Note: Restaino served as acting attorney general in his capacity as United States Attorney for the District of Arizona, pursuant to Executive Order 14136 titled "Providing an Order of Succession Within the Department of Justice" that was signed by President Joe Biden on January 3, 2025 and published in the Federal Register on January 13, 2025, for a few hours following the resignation of Merrick Garland as attorney general at noon on January 20, 2025 and the subsequent resignation of Lisa Monaco as acting attorney general a couple of hours after the resignation of Garland as attorney general. President Donald Trump signed an executive order naming DOJ Chief Administrative Hearing Officer James McHenry as acting attorney general later in the day on January 20, 2025.); Acting | Arizona | January 20, 2025 | | Donald Trump (2025–present) |
| – | | James McHenry; Acting | Washington, D.C. | January 20, 2025 | February 5, 2025 | Donald Trump (2025–present) |
| 87 | | Pam Bondi | Florida | February 5, 2025 | April 2, 2026 | Donald Trump (2025–present) |
| 88 | | Todd Blanche | Florida | April 2, 2026 | August 10, 2026 | Donald Trump (2025–present) |
| 88 | | Todd Blanche | Florida | August 10, 2026 | Incumbent | Donald Trump (2025–present) |

== Line of succession ==
=== Presidential succession ===
The Attorney General is 7th in the presidential line of succession following the Secretary of Defense and preceding the Secretary of the Interior.

=== Attorney General succession ===
28 U.S.C. § 508 establishes the first two positions in the line of succession, while allowing the attorney general to designate other high-ranking officers of the Department of Justice as subsequent successors. Furthermore, the most recent Executive Order pertaining to the line of succession, Executive Order 14136 titled "Providing an Order of Succession Within the Department of Justice" that was signed by President Joe Biden on January 3, 2025, and published in the Federal Register on January 13, 2025, but was revoked by President Donald Trump on January 20, 2025 and has yet to be replaced with another executive order pertaining to the line of succession, defines subsequent positions. The most recent line of succession was:

1. United States Deputy Attorney General
2. United States Associate Attorney General
3. Other officers potentially designated by the attorney general (in no particular order):
  - Solicitor General of the United States
  - Assistant Attorney General, Antitrust Division
  - Assistant Attorney General, Civil Division
  - Assistant Attorney General, Civil Rights Division
  - Assistant Attorney General, Criminal Division
  - Assistant Attorney General, National Security Division
  - Assistant Attorney General, Environment and Natural Resources Division
  - Assistant Attorney General, Tax Division
  - Assistant Attorney General, Office of Justice Programs
  - Assistant Attorney General, Office of Legal Counsel
  - Assistant Attorney General, Office of Legal Policy
  - Assistant Attorney General, Office of Legislative Affairs
4. United States Attorney for the Southern District of New York
5. United States Attorney for the District of Arizona
6. United States Attorney for the Northern District of Illinois
7. United States Attorney for the District of Hawaii

== Notable figures ==
- First Italian American male: Charles Joseph Bonaparte in 1906
- First Jewish American male: Edward H. Levi in 1975
- First female: Janet Reno in 1993
- First Hispanic American male: Alberto Gonzales in 2005
- First African American male: Eric Holder in 2009
- First African American female: Loretta Lynch in 2015

== See also ==
- Attorney General's Awards for Distinguished Service in Policing

== Notes ==
U.S. order of precedence (ceremonial)
| Preceded by Pete Hegseth as Secretary of Defense | Order of precedence of the United States as Attorney General | Succeeded by Doug Burgum as Secretary of the Interior |
U.S. presidential line of succession
| Preceded by Secretary of Defense; Pete Hegseth | 7th in line | Succeeded by Secretary of the Interior; Doug Burgum |
