= Associate deputy attorney general =

Position in the United States Department of Justice

United States Associate Deputy Attorney General
- Seal of the Department of Justice
- United States Department of Justice
- Style: Associate Deputy Attorney General
- Reports to: United States Deputy Attorney General
- Seat: Department of Justice Headquarters, Washington, D.C.
- Formation: 1972

Associate deputy attorney general is a position in the Office of the Deputy Attorney General in the United States Department of Justice. The number of positions varies widely depending on the staffing discretion of the deputy attorney general, but in 2017, there were five such positions, all of whom served as advisors to the deputy attorney general. There is also a separate principal associate deputy attorney general, who is the principal advisor to the deputy attorney general, and to whom all associate deputy attorneys general report. The associate deputy attorney general positions are filled by Senior Executive Service (SES) career attorneys, by SES political appointees, or by non-SES career attorneys serving on detail assignments from elsewhere in the department.

The position is not to be confused with the deputy associate attorneys general, who report to the associate attorney general.

== List ==
=== Nixon administration ===
- Charles D. Ablard

=== Ford administration ===
- Jonathan Chapman Rose (Principal)
- Rudy Giuliani
- Togo D. West Jr.
- James D. Hutchinson

=== Carter administration ===
- Charles Ruff

=== Reagan administration ===
- Randy Levine (Principal)
- James H. Burnley IV
- Roger Clegg
- Bruce Fein
- Wayne Kidwell

=== George H. W. Bush administration ===
- Dee Benson
- Peter Ferrara

=== Clinton administration ===
- Merrick Garland (Principal)
- Robert S. Litt (Principal)
- Irvin B. Nathan (Principal)
- Edward C. DuMont
- Paul J. Fishman
- Andrew Fois
- Brian A. Jackson
- Rory K. Little
- David Margolis
- David W. Ogden
- Catherine M. Russell
- Seth P. Waxman
- Monty Wilkinson

=== George W. Bush administration ===
- William W. Mercer (Principal)
- Christopher A. Wray (Principal)
- Ted Cruz
- David S. Kris
- Stuart A. Levey
- Kevin J. O'Connor
- Johnny Sutton
- Karen Tandy
- Patrick B. Murray

=== Obama administration ===
- Kathryn Ruemmler (Principal)
- Lisa Monaco (Principal)
- Stuart Goldberg (Principal)
- Matthew S. Axelrod (Principal)
- David O'Neil
- Armando O. Bonilla
- Samir Jain
- Neil MacBride
- Steven Reich
- Carlos Uriarte
- Donald B. Verrilli Jr.
- Miriam Vogel

=== First Trump administration ===
- James Crowell (Principal)
- Robert Hur (Principal)
- Ed O'Callaghan (Principal)
- Seth DuCharme (Principal)
- Richard Donoghue (Principal)
- Antoinette Bacon
- Adam L. Braverman
- Zachary Bolitho
- Steve Cook
- Erin Creegan
- Richard DiZinno
- Christopher Grieco
- Brendan Groves
- Stacie Harris
- Jarad Hodes
- Bruce Ohr
- Patrick Hovakimian
- William Hughes
- Amanda Liskamm
- Jennifer Mascott
- Michael Murray
- Sujit Raman
- Scott Schools
- G. Zachary Terwilliger
- Robyn Thiemann
- David Wetmore
- Bradley Weinsheimer

=== Biden administration ===
- John P. Carlin (Principal)
- Marshall Miller (Principal)
- L. Rush Atkinson
- David Newman
- Emily Loeb
- Kevin Chambers

=== Second Trump administration ===
- Emil Bove (Principal)
- Jordan Fox
- James McHenry
- Vetan Kapoor
- Ketan Bhirud
- Aakash Singh
- Kendra Wharton
- Trent McCotter (Principal)
