= Katie Atkinson =

Professor and dean of computer science at University of Liverpool

- Education: University of Liverpool (BSc, 2002) (PhD, 2005)
- Known for: Artificial intelligence and law
- Scientific career
- Workplaces: University of Liverpool
- Thesis: What Should We Do? Computational Representation of Persuasive Argument in Practical Reasoning (2005)
- Doctoral advisor: Peter John McBurney; Trevor Bench-Capon
- Notable students: Latifa Al-Abdulkarim

Katie Marie Atkinson is a professor of computer science and the Dean of the School of Electrical Engineering, Electronics and Computer Science at the University of Liverpool. She works on researching and building artificial intelligence tools to help judges and lawyers. Atkinson previously served as the President of the International Association for AI and Law.

== Education and early life ==
Atkinson received a Bachelor of Science and Ph.D. in Computer Information Systems, both from the University of Liverpool.

== Career and research ==
Atkinson joined the faculty at the University of Liverpool after completing her Ph.D. in 2005. She studies computational models of argument, focusing on argumentation in practical reasoning and how it can be applied in legal domains. She has published over one hundred articles in peer-reviewed conferences and journals, especially within the fields of AI and law.

Her recent projects have concerned the development of legal reasoning AI technologies for the UK law firm Weightmans, for which she and Trevor Bench-Capon won the Best Use of Technology award at the 2019 Modern Law Awards, and the development of tools to support e-democracy and legal knowledge-based systems. An AI algorithm she developed to judge legal cases had a 96% success rate in judging 32 cases. She said that the technique could become a useful decision support tool to help make judges reasoning “faster, more efficient and consistent”.

Atkinson was Program Chair of the fifteenth edition of the International Conference on Artificial Intelligence and Law. From 2014 to 2015 she served as the Vice President of the International Association for Artificial Intelligence and Law, before becoming president in 2016–17.

In 2019, Atkinson was named one of ten members of an expert advisory group to advise the senior judges of England and Wales on developments in AI. The advisory group consisted of prominent legal technology experts and judges, including Richard Susskind, Sir Geoffrey Vos, and Kay Firth-Butterfield.
