= Latifa Al-Abdulkarim =

Saudi Arabian computer scientist and professor

- Known for: AI ethics Explainable AI; Applying AI to the legal domain
- Title: Assistant Professor of Computer Science at King Saud University

Academic background
- Education: University of Liverpool (PGD, MSc, PhD)
- Thesis: Representation Of Case Law For Argumentative Reasoning (2017)
- Doctoral advisor: Katie Atkinson; Trevor Bench-Capon

Latifa Mohammed Al-Abdulkarim (Arabic: لطيفة العبد الكريم) is a Saudi Arabian computer scientist and professor working on AI ethics, legal technology, and explainable AI. She is currently an assistant professor of computer science at King Saud University and visiting researcher in artificial intelligence and law at the University of Liverpool. Al-Abdulkarim has been recognized by Forbes as one of the “women defining the 21st century AI movement” and was selected as one of the 100 Brilliant Women in AI Ethics in 2020.

== Education ==
Al-Abdulkarim earned a PGD in Computer Software Engineering in 2009, a Master of Science in Computer Science in 2011, and a Ph.D. in Computer Science in 2017 all from the University of Liverpool.

== Career and research ==
Al-Abdulkarim is currently an assistant professor of computer science at King Saud University while also a visiting researcher in AI and law at the University of Liverpool. She researches and studies the application of AI to legal domains, explainable and trustworthy AI, and ethical dimensions of AI.

In 2016 she, Katie Atkinson, and Trevor Bench-Capon published a methodology analyzing legal cases to predict case opinions in the US Supreme Court known as ANGELIC. Abbreviated for "ADF for kNowledGe Encapsulation of Legal Information from Cases", ANGELIC was able to produce programs that decided cases with a high degree of accuracy in multiple domains. She soon worked in collaboration with Thomson Reuters and Weightmans to apply ANGELIC to different legal case domains in the UK. For her research she was awarded the Best Doctoral Consortium at the 26th International Conference on Legal Knowledge and Information Systems.

In addition to her research and teaching, Al-Abdulkarim is a member of the Shura Council has also advised and led the national strategic direction for AI and AI governance for Saudi Arabia's government. She has contributed to G20 AI policy and advised different international organizations including the OECD and ITU. Al-Abdulkarim is also a member in the UNESCO expert group for AI ethics. She serves on the Global Future Council on Artificial Intelligence for Humanity in the World Economic Forum focusing on technically oriented solutions for issues of AI fairness.
