= Miriam Vogel =

American artificial intelligence scholar and lawyer

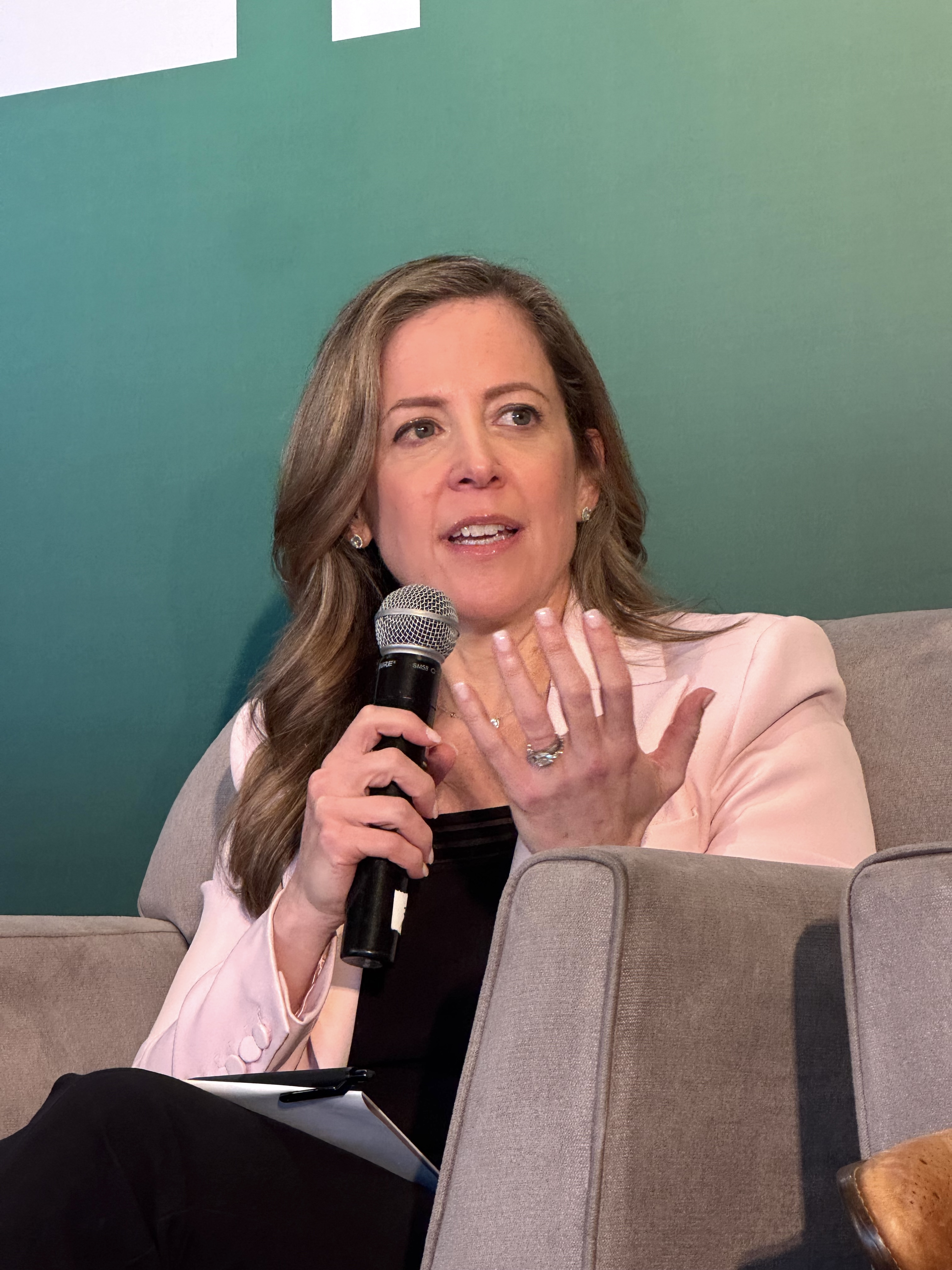

Chair of the National AI Advisory Committee
- In office April 2022 – April 2025
- President: Joe Biden

Associate Deputy Attorney General
- Deputy Attorney General: Sally Yates

Personal details
- Party: Democratic
- Education: University of Michigan (BA); Georgetown University (JD)

Miriam Vogel is an American attorney and artificial intelligence scholar who currently serves as the President and CEO of EqualAI, a nonprofit focused on equity in artificial intelligence. She served as the inaugural chair of the National AI Advisory Committee from 2022 to 2025. She previously served in other governmental roles, including as Associate Deputy Attorney General during the Obama administration.

== Biography ==
She attended the University of Michigan, which she is a third-generation graduate of, and then attended Georgetown University Law Center. She also worked as a federal clerk in Denver and as an employee at the Dana–Farber Cancer Institute.

She worked at the White House during both the Obama and Clinton administrations, heading the Presidential Equal Pay Task Force during the Clinton administration before ultimately becoming an Associate Deputy Attorney General at the U.S. Department of Justice.

She serves as president and CEO of EqualAI, a nonprofit which focuses on reducing unconscious bias in AI systems. In this capacity, among other things, she has argued that the use of female voices for AI agents like Alexa is "teaching the next generation to double down on... stereotypes."

She served as the inaugural chair of the National AI Advisory Committee under Joe Biden, a role she held from April 2022 to April 2025.

She also co-hosts the podcast "In AI We Trust?" along with Kay Firth-Butterfield. In 2024, she hosted a Hoover Institution event on AI featuring Gina Raimondo, Condoleezza Rice, and Fei-Fei Li.

She co-authored the book Governing the Machine: How to navigate the risks of AI and unlock its true potential, which “provides business leaders with a practical and flexible framework for building comprehensive and robust AI governance”: it was endorsed by Reid Hoffman. She also sits on the board of the Center for Democracy and Technology, previously served on the board of the Responsible AI Institute, and teaches technology law and policy at Georgetown University. She is a member of the Council on Foreign Relations. She was listed as a DC Tech Titan by Washingtonian in 2025.

She has argued that courts will shape AI regulations more than Congress. She has also emphasized AI literacy, pitching it as a way to ensure AI will work for more than just a select few, and opposes what she has dubbed a "doomsday narrative" about AI. She has proposed a database tracking AI failures.
