= Undercounting of COVID-19 pandemic deaths by country =

Undercounting of COVID-19 pandemic deaths has been witnessed around the world. Global mortality excess estimates by the World Health Organization are significantly different from official figures, pointing to undercounting– "while 1,813,188 COVID-19 deaths were reported in 2020... WHO estimates suggest an excess mortality of at least 3,000,000." The global average for underreporting COVID-19 deaths in cities is 30%. The aim of arriving at a truer death count is ultimately linked to improving national and international abilities and responses to fighting the virus. Undercounting can cause a number of problems such as delay in vaccines to priority populations.

Lack of resources with regard to testing, differences in how COVID-19 cases and deaths are counted, and other inefficiencies in data collection and updation largely explain this undercounting. In Africa, eight of the 56 sovereign states compulsorily register deaths. In Europe, apart from two countries, all have a universal death registration system. In India 70% of the deaths are registered while medical certificates are given to a minority of these; in 2019 registration of deaths varied significantly from state to state (37% to 100%).

== Counting COVID-19 deaths ==
Counting of COVID-19 deaths is complicated by co-morbidities— classifying whether the person died "of" or "with" COVID-19. In India in March 2020, the first two COVID-19 infected persons to die, officially died due to other illnesses, co-morbidities, and not the virus. In the United Kingdom, following changes in how COVID-19 deaths are counted to only include those within 28 days of a positive test, the number of COVID-19 fatalities diverged from the number of deaths with "COVID-19" listed as a cause of death on death certificates. In April 2020, New York increased its COVID-19 death count to include persons assumed to die from lung diseases but not tested for the virus.

== Confirmed COVID-19 deaths vs excess deaths ==
Country	COVID-19 confirmed	Excess	%	Dates and sources
Australia *	880	−2460	−279.5	2020-04-06/2021-07-25
Bosnia and Herzegovina *	9650	15040	155.9	2020-04-01/2021-06-30
Bulgaria *	23030	45690	198.4	2020-04-20/2021-10-24
Iceland *	30	−30	−100.0	2020-02-03/2021-08-15
Liechtenstein *	10	−10	−100.0	2021-01-01/2021-08-31
Lithuania *	5820	14370	246.9	2020-05-25/2021-10-31
Mauritius *	20	−550	−2,750.0	2020-02-01/2021-06-30
Mexico *	277790	579440	208.6	2020-03-30/2021-10-10
New Zealand *	30	−2680	−8,933.3	2020-02-03/2021-10-24
North Macedonia *	5930	11510	194.1	2020-08-01/2021-08-31
Peru *	200600	196940	98.2	2020-03-23/2021-11-14
Russia *	234180	904340	386.2	2020-04-01/2021-10-31
Serbia *	8220	35340	429.9	2020-04-01/2021-09-30
South Korea *	2270	−3430	−151.1	2020-03-02/2021-08-29
South Africa *	89476	271311	303.2	2020-05-03/2021-11-13

== Situation by country ==
=== China ===
On 17 April 2020, China increased its official figures of deaths from COVID-19 by 50% to correct for undercounting as a result of "undetected deaths at home, late and incomplete reporting". The results of serological survey by the Chinese Center for Disease Control and Prevention released on 28 December 2020 shows that COVID-19 cases in Wuhan may have been undercounted to the ratio of 1 to 10.

=== Egypt ===
On average, COVID-19 deaths made up under 10% of the excess deaths between May and August 2020. The estimates of undercounting in Egypt by Institute for Health Metrics and Evaluation (IHME) was in the ratio of 1 to 12. Between the start of the pandemic and May 2021, Egypt registered nearly 200,000 excess deaths, compared to only 15,000 confirmed COVID deaths, one of the greatest underestimates in the world.

=== India ===
In April and May 2021, a number of India newspapers reported on the discrepancies between the number of cremations at various locations and the official counts for COVID-19 deaths at the same locations, leading to conclusions of undercounting. The Telegraph accessed an order in a rota circulated in a hospital in West Bengal related to COVID-19 deaths which said "In case of Covid positive - No mention of Covid in death certificate." Such cover-ups also contribute to undercounts in the national figures. Not mentioning COVID-19 as the cause of death on the death certificate has caused a number of orphans whose parents died of COVID-19 to become ineligible for orphan specific government schemes.

=== Indonesia ===
In April 2020, a Reuters data review found that 2200 people dying in Indonesia of severe COVID-19 symptoms were not part of the government's tally for deaths due to the virus. In March and April 2020 Jakarta saw excess mortality counts much higher than the number of deaths being attributed to the virus. Around the same time period, the number of burials following COVID-19 precautions were over five times the number of the official government COVID-19 death count. A study that had been conducted between December 2020 and January 2021 had suggested that around 15% of Indonesia's population had already contracted COVID-19, much more than the official percentage of only 0.4% at the time, while a survey conducted in 15–31 March 2021 found that 44.5% of Jakarta's population of 10.6 million people had already contracted COVID-19, compared to the official count of 382,000 (3.6%) at the end of March.

=== Italy ===
In March 2020, Bergamo had 5,400 deaths as compared to an average of 996 deaths (average taking into past five years). The Wall Street Journal estimated an excess of 352 deaths due to COVID-19 while the confirmed COVID-19 deaths were 201.

=== Japan ===
In May 2020 excess deaths in Tokyo were 200. Nikkei Asia reasoned that "lack of testing and delayed numbers take blame for possible undercount".

=== Mexico ===
In October 2020 Mexico's National Centre for Preventive Programs and Disease Control came out with a statement that Mexico had undercounted deaths by at least 50,000. However by 29 December 2020 these extra deaths had not been included into the overall death count. On 28 March 2021 Mexico revised its official death toll with an increase of 60%.

=== Pakistan ===
Doctors in Pakistan told The Telegraph that in Khyber Pakhtunkhwa stigma was resulting in undercounts. However, an official said that while undercounting was likely, the numbers weren't significant enough relative to the total death count.

=== Peru ===
On 31 May 2021 Peru revised its official COVID-19 death toll from 69,342 to 180,764. This revision was made following the on-ground situation and reports which were significantly different from official figures. The revision was made by an expert panel formed in April 2021, the panel consisted of health experts from Peru and WHO. Following the revision Prime Minister Bermúdez stated that "we will have more exhaustive figures and figures that will be very useful to monitor the pandemic and take appropriate measures to confront it".

=== Russia ===
On 28 December 2020 Russia's Federal State Statistics Service released new excess death figures out of which more than 81% were attributed to COVID-19 taking Russia's death toll in 2020 to over 186,000. This was done following reports of undercounting, underreporting, and criticism surrounding Russia's criteria for counting a COVID-19 death. Indicators of death such as ambulance usage and deaths of health workers had also pointed to higher death figures.

=== South Africa ===
As of 13 November 2021, excess deaths since 3 May 2020 was 271311 with 85–95% attributable to COVID-19, and the remaining 5–15% probably mainly due to overwhelming of the health services. This was more than 3 times the official COVID-19 death toll of 89476.

=== Syria ===
A study published in Nature Communications estimated that only 1.25% of COVID-19 mortality was reported in Damascus during the first wave, and 12.6% of COVID-19 deaths have been reported in the second wave.

=== United States ===
In May 2021, following an analysis by the IHME that the true count of fatalities due to COVID-19 in United States was above 900,000, Anthony Fauci said that he had "no doubt" there was undercounting of COVID-19 deaths. A study published in The Lancet in September 2020 also pointed to significant undercounting. Undercounting has been reported from Virginia and California. A 2021 scandal involving New York authorities during the administration of Gov. Andrew Cuomo involved undercounting or an alleged cover-up of COVID-19 deaths in nursing homes in 2020.

=== Zambia ===
From June to September 2020, a prospective systematic postmortem surveillance study was conducted in Lusaka to measure the postmortem prevalence of SARS-CoV-2. The study found less than 10% of people who had COVID-19 before death were tested.

== Overcounting ==
Stanford University School of Medicine came out with a study which found that overcounting of COVID-19 hospitalizations in children may be occurring. ThePrint published figures that the Delhi government may have started over-counting; hinting at mortality displacement. Low testing may result in a high death rates, causing overestimates in mortality related modelling.

In May 2022, the WHO report stated that there were 14.9 million deaths worldwide due to COVID-19 by the end of 2021, a figure that is 3 times higher than the official estimate of 5.4 million deaths. This WHO report reflect people who died of COVID-19 and also those who died as an indirect result of the virus. The report "accounts for deaths averted during the pandemic, for example because of the lower risk of traffic accidents during lockdowns."
