= Ed O'Callaghan =

American lawyer

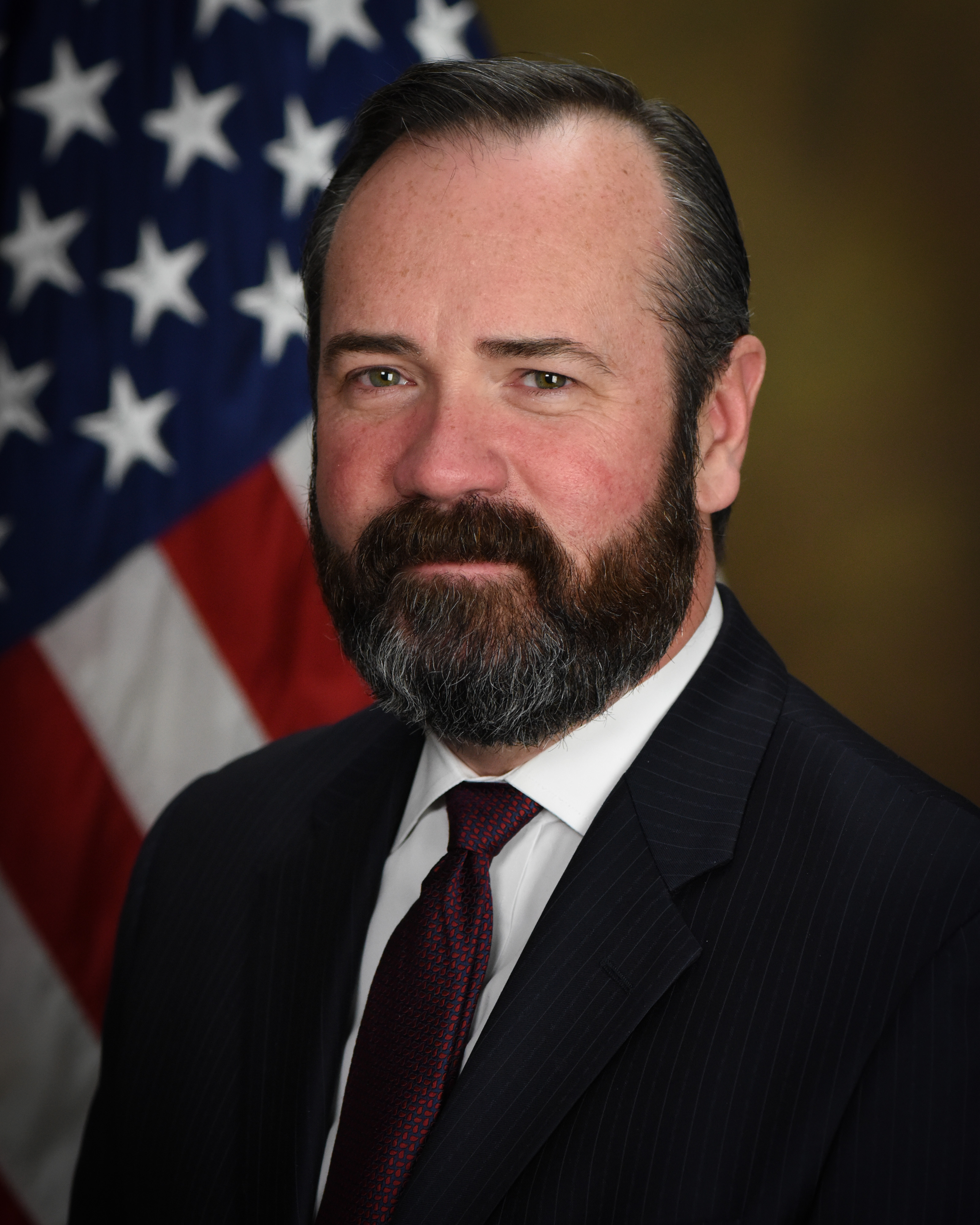
- Official portrait, 2018

United States Deputy Attorney General
- Acting
- In office May 13, 2019 – May 22, 2019
- President: Donald Trump
- Attorney General: William Barr
- Preceded by: Rod Rosenstein
- Succeeded by: Jeffrey A. Rosen

Principal Associate Deputy Attorney General
- In office April 2018 – December 2019
- President: Donald Trump
- Attorney General: Jeff Sessions; Rod Rosenstein (acting); Matthew Whitaker (acting); William Barr
- Preceded by: Robert Hur
- Succeeded by: Seth DuCharme

Personal details
- Born: Edward Casey O'Callaghan; June 8, 1969 (age 56); Brooklyn, New York, U.S.
- Political party: Republican
- Spouse: Katie Barlow (m. 2021)
- Education: Georgetown University (BA); New York University (JD)

Edward Casey O'Callaghan (born June 8, 1969) is an American attorney and former U.S. Department of Justice official.

In his early career, O'Callaghan was an assistant U.S. attorney in the U.S. Attorney's Office for the Southern District of New York. He resigned to join John McCain's 2008 presidential campaign, where he became one of the public faces of the legal defense of McCain's running mate, Sarah Palin, against ethics charges related to her former brother-in-law (the "Troopergate" affair). From 2009 to 2011, he worked at the law firm Nixon Peabody, then from 2011 to 2017 he was a partner at the New York office of law firm Clifford Chance. In 2017, during the Trump administration, he became the principal deputy assistant attorney general of the U.S. Department of Justice National Security Division. He left the department in 2019 and returned to private practice.

== Early life and education ==
O'Callaghan was born in Brooklyn, New York. He earned a Bachelor of Arts degree from Georgetown University and a Juris Doctor from the New York University School of Law. From 1995 to 1996, O'Callaghan served as a law clerk to Judge Kevin Duffy of the United States District Court for the Southern District of New York.

== Career ==
Early in his career, O'Callaghan was an assistant U.S. attorney in the U.S. Attorney's Office for the Southern District of New York. He was co-chief of the office's terrorism and national security unit.

=== Sarah Palin "truth squad" ===
In 2008, O'Callaghan became a lawyer for the presidential campaign of Republican John McCain. He co-led what the Anchorage Daily News called "a cadre of high-powered operatives" described by McCain's campaign as a "truth squad" to field questions about and defend attacks against his running mate, vice-presidential candidate Sarah Palin, the governor of Alaska. His two co-leaders were Karl Rove protégée Brian Jones, and Washington lawyer Mark Paoletta. Paoletta, Jones, and O'Callaghan were "tasked specifically with responding to the sort of viral attacks that have been popping up about Palin's background and record in Alaska... The public face for this pushback, though, will be woman Republican politicians, a 'truth squad' team designed to highlight attacks on Palin and draw sympathy to her side." Paoletta and Jones were volunteers while O'Callaghan was on staff.

O'Callaghan was sent to Alaska to handle "legal issues that are affecting the political dynamic of the campaign," according to Taylor Griffin, a former Treasury Department official in the Bush administration. Newsweek described O'Callaghan's role as "helping to direct an aggressive legal strategy aimed at shutting down a pre-election ethics investigation" into Palin." Working with Palin's attorney Thomas Van Flein, O'Callaghan worked to block the investigation, telling reporters, "There was no Ethics Act violation and there is no need to go forward with this."

The Alaska Personnel Board concluded that Palin did not violate the Alaska Executive Ethics Act by trying to get her brother-in-law fired. Alaska Personnel Board investigations are normally secret, but the three-member board chose to release its report one day before the presidential election.

=== Private practice ===
O'Callaghan moved into private practice in March 2009, joining the law firm Nixon Peabody as part of its Government Investigations and White Collar Defense Practice Group. In 2011, he joined the law firm Clifford Chance in New York as a Partner in its White Collar, Regulatory Enforcement and Government Investigations practice group. O'Callaghan worked on several high-profile cases; he represented Achilles Macris, who was head of the London branch of JPMorgan Chase's chief investment office, where the trader nicknamed the "London Whale" operated. O'Callaghan also served on the defense of Jeffrey Webb, the former President of CONCACAF and member of the FIFA Council, in the criminal RICO indictment pending in the United States District Court for the Eastern District of New York.

=== Justice Department tenure during Trump administration ===
In 2017, O'Callaghan became the principal deputy assistant attorney general of the Justice Department's National Security Division. In April 2018, he became the principal associate deputy attorney general, replacing Robert K. Hur.

Geoffrey S. Berman, who was U.S. Attorney for the Southern District of New York from 2018 to 2020, wrote in his 2022 memoirs that, throughout his two and a half years as U.S. attorney, officials in Trump's Justice Department, including O'Callaghan, repeatedly attempted to interfere with the office to politically benefit Trump, and that these officials "kept demanding that I use my office to aid them politically." Berman wrote that U.S. Attorney's Office for the Southern District of New York (USAO-SDNY) had come under a level of political pressure from Trump officials that was "unprecedented and scary," and that he rebuffed these requests until June 2020, when—angered by USAO-SDNY's investigations into Trump allies Michael Cohen and Rudy Giuliani—Trump fired him. Berman said that, following his office's investigation, USAO-SDNY concluded that Gregory B. Craig, a powerful Democratic lawyer whom the office had investigated, had committed no crime, and declined to charge him, but that in September 2018, O'Callaghan contacted Berman's office and asked him to charge Craig before the 2018 midterm elections, saying that "It's time for you guys to even things out" after the indictments of Cohen and Chris Collins, a Republican congressman and Trump ally. O'Callaghan denied making the statements. In 2022, following the publication of Berman's book, the Senate Judiciary Committee opened an investigation into allegations that the Trump administration sought to use the U.S. Attorney's office in SDNY for partisan reasons.

In 2019, O'Callaghan co-authored a memorandum, issued by the DOJ Office of Legal Counsel, that recommended that Trump should not be indicted for obstruction of justice. The nine-page memo, dated March 24, 2019, was co-written with another senior Trump DOJ official, Assistant Attorney General Steven Engel. O'Callaghan and Engel asserted that the evidence uncovered by the special counsel investigation led by Robert Mueller was insufficient to support a case for obstruction against Trump. DOJ initially kept the memo secret. The watchdog organization Citizens for Responsibility and Ethics in Washington launched a Freedom of Information Act suit against the Justice Department, and the U.S. Court of Appeals for the D.C. Circuit, in August 2022, ordered the memo's public release. The D.C. Circuit held that the memo was not shielded from disclosure by the deliberative process privilege, because then-Attorney General William Barr had already determined, by the time the memo was written, that DOJ would not charge Trump with a crime, making the memo akin to a "thought experiment."

=== After 2019 ===
O'Callaghan left office in December 2019 and joined WilmerHale in April 2020.

Legal offices
Preceded by Robert Hur	Principal Associate Deputy Attorney General; 2018–2019	Succeeded by Seth DuCharme
Preceded by Rod Rosenstein	United States Deputy Attorney General; Acting; 2019	Succeeded by Jeffrey A. Rosen
