= Trevor Bench-Capon =

British computer scientist

- Education: Oxford University (PhD, 1980)
- Known for: Artificial intelligence applied to law Ontology
- Scientific career
- Workplaces: University of Liverpool
- Thesis: Can God Be an Object of Reference? (1980)
- Doctoral advisor: Michael Dummett
- Notable students: Latifa Al-Abdulkarim; Katie Atkinson

Trevor Bench-Capon (born 1953, died 20th May 2024) was a British computer scientist and an Honorary Visiting Professor of computer science at the University of Liverpool, where he taught from 1987 until his retirement in 2012. He is the author of work on computer science and ontology and is one of the editors in chief of the Artificial Intelligence and Law Journal.

== Life ==
After reading Philosophy and Economics at St John's College, Oxford, Bench-Capon took the research degree of D. Phil at Oxford. He then worked in the policy and computer branches of the British Government's Department of Health and Social Security, after which he researched logic programming as applied to legislation at Imperial College London. Since 1987 he has been an academic in the Computer Science department of the University of Liverpool, first as lecturer, then from 1992 senior lecturer, from 1999 Reader, and from 2004 as Professor of Computer Science. With Kevin D. Ashley and Giovanni Sartor he is an editor in chief of the Artificial Intelligence and Law Journal.

Bench-Capon's interests are all aspects of advanced informatics systems, with a specialism in the application of such systems to law. He has been called "one of the world's recognised experts on AI and the law".

In 1975 Bench-Capon was a member of the St John's College University Challenge team, and in 1978 he married Priscilla Bradley, who had represented St Anne's in the competition earlier that year. Their sons James and Michael appeared in the University Challenge teams of Clare College, Cambridge, and Oriel College, Oxford, in 2002 and 2003 respectively.

== Major publications ==
- Trevor Bench-Capon & Marek Sergot, Towards a rule-based representation of open texture in law (1985)
- T. J. M. Bench-Capon, Knowledge representation: an approach to artificial intelligence (1990)
- Trevor J. M. Bench-Capon, ed., Knowledge-based systems and legal applications (London: Academic Press, 1991)
- Gerald Quirchmayr, Erich Schweighofer & Trevor J. M. Bench-Capon, Database and Expert Systems Applications: Proceedings of the 9th International Conference, DEXA'98, Vienna, Austria, August 24–28, 1998 (1998)
- Dean Jones, Trevor Bench-Capon & Pepijn Visser, Methodologies for Ontology Development (1998)
- Trevor Bench-Capon, Giovanni Sartor & A Min Tjoa, Database and Expert Systems Applications: Proceedings of the 10th International Conference, DEXA'99, Florence, Italy, August 30 - September 3, 1999 (1999)
- Trevor J. M. Bench-Capon, Aspassia Daskalopulu, Radboud Winkels, Legal Knowledge and Information Systems: JURIX 2002 (2002)
- Bench-Capon, Trevor JM. "Persuasion in practical argument using value-based argumentation frameworks." Journal of Logic and Computation 13, no. 3 (2003): 429-448.
- Bench-Capon, Trevor, and Giovanni Sartor. "A model of legal reasoning with cases incorporating theories and values." Artificial Intelligence 150, no. 1-2 (2003): 97-143.
- Paul E. Dunne & Trevor J. M. Bench-Capon, Computational Models of Argument: Proceedings of COMMA 2006 (Frontiers in Artificial Intelligence and Applications, 2006)
- Bench-Capon, Trevor JM, and Paul E. Dunne. "Argumentation in artificial intelligence." Artificial intelligence 171, no. 10-15 (2007): 619-641.
- Atkinson, Katie, and Trevor Bench-Capon. "Practical reasoning as presumptive argumentation using action based alternating transition systems." Artificial Intelligence 171, no. 10-15 (2007): 855-874.
- Atkinson, Katie, and Trevor Bench-Capon. "Taking account of the actions of others in value-based reasoning." Artificial Intelligence 254 (2018): 1-20.
- Bench-Capon, Trevor JM. "Ethical approaches and autonomous systems." Artificial Intelligence 281 (2020): 103239.
