= Seth DuCharme =

American attorney

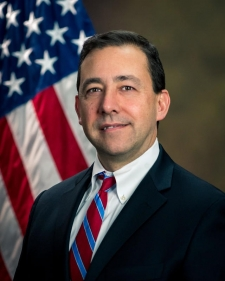

Acting United States Attorney for the Eastern District of New York
- In office July 10, 2020 – March 19, 2021
- President: Donald Trump; Joe Biden
- Preceded by: Richard Donoghue
- Succeeded by: Mark Lesko

Principal Associate Deputy Attorney General
- In office December 23, 2019 – July 10, 2020
- President: Donald Trump
- Preceded by: Ed O'Callaghan
- Succeeded by: Richard Donoghue

Personal details
- Education: Hamilton College (BA); Fordham University (JD)

Seth D. DuCharme is an American attorney who served as the acting United States Attorney for the Eastern District of New York. DuCharme appointed by Attorney General William Barr and sworn in on July 10, 2020, succeeding Richard Donoghue, who left to become the principal associate deputy attorney general to Jeffrey A. Rosen.

== Early life and education ==
DuCharme is a native of Long Island, New York. He earned a Bachelor of Arts from Hamilton College and a Juris Doctor from the Fordham University School of Law.

== Career ==
After graduating from law school, DuCharme worked as a law clerk for Richard Owen of the United States District Court for the Southern District of New York. DuCharme joined the office of the United States Attorney for the Eastern District of New York after working as an attorney at Simpson Thacher & Bartlett. He also served at the United States Department of Justice in Washington, D.C. as principal associate deputy attorney general to Jeffrey A. Rosen and counselor to William Barr.

In 2018, DuCharme was appointed criminal chief of the Eastern District Court of New York, where he oversaw national security and cybercrime prosecution. DuCharme was selected to serve as acting United States Attorney in July 2020, and was officially sworn in on July 10. On March 8, 2021, DuCharme announced his resignation as U.S. Attorney, effective March 19, 2021, and sent letters to President Biden and acting United States attorney general Monty Wilkinson to inform them. Following DuCharme's departure, Mark Lesko was appointed acting U.S. Attorney.

In May 2021, DuCharme joined the law firm Bracewell LLP as a partner.

== Personal life ==
DuCharme is married to Dyan Finguerra-DuCharme, a trademark attorney at Pryor Cashman LLP.
