= Steven Reich =

American attorney

Steven F. Reich is an American attorney who currently serves as 3M Company’s executive vice president and chief counsel, enterprise risk management. Reich joined 3M in 2022 after nearly seven years at Deutsche Bank AG. At Deutsche Bank, Reich served as general counsel for the Americas and then as CEO of the Bank’s main regulated entity in the US, Deutsche Bank Trust Company Americas. From 2011 to 2013, he served as associate deputy attorney general in the United States Department of Justice.

== Early life and education ==
Reich's mother was a social worker and his father was an internist who practiced medicine at a public health clinic in the Bronx. Reich graduated from Columbia College in 1983 and began his career as an associate at Covington & Burling following his graduation from Columbia Law School in 1986.

== Career ==
At Covington & Burling, Reich handled white collar criminal and civil litigation matters. He attracted significant media attention during his time at the firm related to his representation of an individual charged with the murder of Jay Bias, brother of the late University of Maryland basketball star Len Bias. Although Reich’s client was convicted after a first trial, Reich succeeded in having the verdict overturned on appeal and his client was acquitted after a retrial.

From 1994 to 1998, Reich served as an assistant federal public defender for the District of Maryland. In 1998, he moved to the minority staff of the Judiciary Committee of the U.S. House of Representatives, where he was deputy chief investigative counsel during the impeachment proceedings against President Bill Clinton. After President Clinton's impeachment by the House, Reich Served as impeachment counsel to the minority members of the U.S. Senate. He thereafter served as senior associate counsel to President Clinton from 1999 to 2001.

Reich next was a partner at the law firm of Manatt Phelps & Phillips, LLP from 2001 to 2011. While at Manatt, he served as special counsel to a Select Committee of Inquiry of the Connecticut House of Representatives charged with considering whether Connecticut governor John G. Rowland should be impeached. Rowland resigned during the pendency of Reich's investigation.

In June 2011, Reich was appointed to the position of associate deputy attorney general at the U.S. Department of Justice. In that role, Reich served as a senior advisor to Attorney General Eric Holder and Deputy Attorney General Jim Cole and oversaw the Justice Department’s handling of congressional investigations into Fast and Furious and Aaron Swartz.

Reich returned to private practice in 2013 as a partner at the law firm of Akin Gump Strauss Hauer & Feld. While at Akin Gump, Reich was selected to be Special Counsel to a Special Committee of the Utah House of Representatives charged with determining whether Utah Attorney General John Swallow had engaged in misconduct. Swallow resigned during the pendency of the investigation led by Reich. Swallow was later acquitted of all charges following a trial in which jurors stated that evidence was not there to support the allegations.

In 2015, Reich was selected by Deutsche Bank AG to serve as its General Counsel for the Americas, effective April 2015. He negotiated Deutsche Bank's resolution of the RMBS investigation with the Department of Justice in late 2016. In 2019, the Wall Street Journal reported that Reich, as a member of the Bank's reputational risk committee, had opposed a controversial decision to sell real estate located in Silicon Valley to a Russian businessman.

In late 2020, Deutsche Bank announced that Reich had been promoted to serve as CEO and a board member of its key legal entities in the United States and to the position of Head of Strategy & Governance Initiatives for the Americas.

Reich remained at Deutsche Bank until he joined 3M in early 2022. Bloomberg Law reported that Reich had been hired by 3M amid a slate of $33 billion in legal exposures that were similar in magnitude to the obstacles that Reich had helped Deutsche Bank navigate. Bloomberg further noted that Reich would advise 3M’s board and senior leadership on enterprise level matters. In July 2022, 3M announced that its Belgian subsidiary had reached a €571 million settlement with the government in Flanders related to alleged environmental contamination. Thereafter, in June 2023, 3M announced that it had reached an agreement with U.S water suppliers in a present value amount of $10.3B to resolve claims related to alleged contamination of drinking water.
