= Richard Donoghue =

American attorney and prosecutor

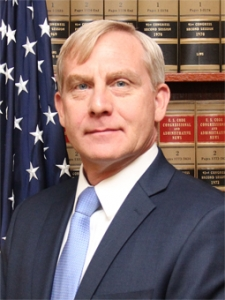
- Official portrait, 2018

United States Deputy Attorney General
- Acting
- In office December 24, 2020 – January 20, 2021
- President: Donald Trump
- Preceded by: Jeffrey A. Rosen
- Succeeded by: John P. Carlin (acting)

Principal Associate Deputy Attorney General
- In office July 10, 2020 – January 20, 2021
- President: Donald Trump
- Preceded by: Seth DuCharme
- Succeeded by: John P. Carlin

United States Attorney for the Eastern District of New York
- In office January 3, 2018 – July 10, 2020
- President: Donald Trump
- Preceded by: Bridget Rohde (acting)
- Succeeded by: Seth DuCharme (acting)

Personal details
- Party: Republican
- Education: Hofstra University (BA); St. John's University (JD)

Military service
- Allegiance: United States
- Branch/service: United States Army

Richard Donoghue is an American attorney and prosecutor who served as the acting United States deputy attorney general from December 2020 to January 2021. Previously, he served as the principal associate deputy attorney general in 2020 and as United States attorney for the Eastern District of New York from 2018 to 2020. Donoghue was appointed interim U.S. Attorney by Jeff Sessions in January 2018.

== Education ==
Donoghue earned a Bachelor of Arts degree from Hofstra University and Juris Doctor from the St. John's University School of Law.

== Career ==
Donoghue served in the Judge Advocate General's Corps, United States Army From 1993 to 2000, where he was a military magistrate judge, prosecutor, defense counsel, and contract litigator. He also served in the 82nd Airborne Division. From 2000 and 2011, he was Assistant United States Attorney in the Eastern District of New York's United States Attorney's Office. From 2011 to 2018 he was chief litigation counsel for CA Technologies.

U.S. Attorney Richard Donoghue announces the conviction of Keith Raniere outside the Theodore Roosevelt United States Courthouse on June 19, 2019

In January 2018, Attorney General Jeff Sessions selected Donoghue to serve as interim United States Attorney for the Eastern District of New York. He led this office in the successful prosecutions of Joaquín "El Chapo" Guzmán, Keith Raniere, and Thomas Spota. It was also under Donoghue that the Eastern District of New York indicted Robert Sylvester Kelly on the first set of federal charges for which he was tried and ultimately convicted.

Donoghue also led the District in the controversial decision to decline prosecution of Daniel Pantaleo for the death-in-custody of Eric Garner.

In July 2020 Attorney General William Barr announced that Donoghue would leave the Eastern District of New York to serve as principal associate deputy attorney general at the United States Department of Justice.

=== Aftermath of the 2020 Presidential Election ===
On December 14, 2020, President Trump announced via Twitter that Barr would be resigning from his post as attorney general, effective December 23. Barr further confirmed his resignation in a letter to Trump on the same day. It was announced that Jeffrey A. Rosen would become acting Attorney General on December 24, the day after William Barr's resignation took effect. As a result of the shuffle, Donoghue took the role of acting Deputy Attorney General.

==== Pressure to declare election fraudulent ====
A brief quote from former acting Deputy Attorney General Richard Donoghue's testimony to the counsel of the United States House Select Committee on the January 6 Attack

Alongside Rosen, Donoghue appeared before the United States House Select Committee on the January 6 Attack (also known as the "January 6th Committee") for its fifth public hearing. They testified about the pressure campaign by Trump and surrogates in the days between the 2020 presidential election and the 2021 United States Capitol attack. In addition to testimony, Donoghue provided contemporaneous notes memorializing conversations with President Trump. The notes directly quote Trump ordering Donoghue to "just say the election was corrupt, and leave the rest to me and the Republican Congressmen."

In their accounts, Donoghue and Rosen recounted their dealings with Jeffrey Clark, Acting Assistant Attorney General for United States Department of Justice Civil Division who, outside the Department's chain-of-command, pursued several of Trump's false claims of a stolen election on behalf of the Department. On December 28, 2020, Clark emailed Rosen and Donoghue a draft letter which he reportedly had discussed with Rep. Scott Perry, requesting they sign it. The letter had been emailed to Clark twenty minutes earlier by Ken Klukowski, senior counsel to Clark and a legal analyst for far-right Breitbart News; Klukowski had co-authored a 2010 book titled, The Blueprint: Obama’s Plan to Subvert the Constitution and Build an Imperial Presidency. Klukowski joined the Department of Justice in December 2020, with less than a month left of Trump's term.

The draft letter was addressed to officials in the state of Georgia, saying that the Justice Department had evidence that raised "significant concerns" about the election results in multiple states, contradicting what Barr had publicly announced weeks earlier. The letter suggested the Georgia legislature should "call itself into special session for [t]he limited purpose of considering issues pertaining to the appointment of Presidential Electors". Both Rosen and Donoghue refused to sign the letter.

==== Oval Office Meeting January 3, 2021 ====
On Sunday, January 3, 2021, Donoghue was unexpectedly summoned to the Oval Office for a meeting with President Trump. Testifying about the meeting with the January 6 Committee, Donoghue recounted confronting Trump after he implied he could overcome Rosen's resistance to signing the Georgia letter (and attempts to overturn the 2020 United States presidential election more generally) by simply replacing Rosen with Jeff Clark:

The conversation at this point had moved beyond the specific allegations, whether it was State Farm Arena or Antrim County or Pennsylvania or whatever. We had discussed those repeatedly and the converse — that was backdrop to the conversation. But the conversation at this point was really about whether the president should remove Jeff Rosen and replace him with Jeff Clark.

And everyone in the room I think understood that that meant that letter would go out. So, that was the focus. It was about a two and a half hour meeting after I entered. And so, there were discussions about the pros and cons of doing that. Early on, the president said what do I have to lose? And it was actually a good opening because I said, "Mr. President, you have a great deal to lose."

And I began to explain to him what he had to lose and what the country had to lose and what the department had to lose, and this was not in anyone's best interest. That conversation went on for some time. Everyone essentially chimed in with their own thoughts, all of which were consistent about how damaging this would be to the country, to the department, to the administration, to him personally.

Asked by Adam Kinzinger to elaborate on the damage, Donoghue replied:

And along those lines, [Trump] said, "So suppose I do this. Suppose I replace him, Jeff Rosen, with him, Jeff Clark? What would you do?"

And I said, "Mr. President, I would resign immediately. I'm not working one minute for this guy," who I had just declared was completely incompetent.

And so, the president immediately turned to — to Mr. Engel. And he said, "Steve, you wouldn't resign, would you?"

And he said "Absolutely I would, Mr. President. You leave me no choice."

And — and then I said, "And we're not the only ones. No one cares if we resign. If Steve and I go, that's fine. It doesn't matter.

"But I'm telling you what's going to happen. You're going to lose your entire department leadership. Every single AAG will walk out on you. Your entire department leadership will walk out within hours. And I don't know what happens after that. I don't know what the United States attorneys are going to do. We have US attorneys in districts across the country, and my guess would be that many of them would have resigned."

And that would then have led to resignations across the department in Washington.

And I said, "Mr. President, within 24, 48, 72 hours, you could have hundreds and hundreds of resignations of the leadership of your entire Justice Department because of your actions. What's that going to say about you?"

Donoghue recalled that Trump then declined to move forward on the replacement of Rosen with Clark. He did not, however, fire Jeffrey Clark.

Legal offices
Preceded by Jeffrey A. Rosen	United States Deputy Attorney General; Acting; 2020–2021	Succeeded by John P. Carlin; Acting
Preceded by Seth DuCharme	Principal Associate Deputy Attorney General; 2020–2021	Succeeded by John P. Carlin
