= Kevin Chambers =

American attorney

- Chambers Official DOJ Photo

Director for COVID-19 Fraud Enforcement
- In office March 2022 – January 20, 2025
- Appointed by: Merrick Garland
- President: Joe Biden
- Preceded by: Position created
- Succeeded by: Position abolished

Associate Deputy Attorney General
- In office February 1, 2021 – January 20, 2025
- President: Joe Biden
- Preceded by: Multi-member position
- Succeeded by: Multi-member position

Personal details
- Born: Kevin Andrew Chambers
- Education: University at Albany, SUNY (BS); Yale University (JD)

Kevin Andrew Chambers is an American attorney and former certified public accountant who had served as an associate deputy attorney general in the Biden administration. In March 2022, he was appointed to serve as director for COVID-19 Fraud Enforcement in the United States Department of Justice.

== Education ==
Chambers earned a Bachelor of Science degree in accounting, and a Bachelor of Arts in English, from the University at Albany, SUNY in 1997 and a Juris Doctor from Yale Law School in 2004.

== Career ==
From 1997 to 2000, Chambers worked as an auditor at Ernst & Young. After law school, he worked as an associate at WilmerHale from 2004 to 2006. Before joining the DOJ, Chambers was a partner at Latham & Watkins where he earned over $3 million during 2020 according to his financial disclosure form. As Associate Deputy Attorney General, he managed the Criminal Division portfolio and advised the Deputy Attorney General on the Department's corporate criminal enforcement policy and related prosecutions. Earlier in his legal career, he served in the Office of the United States Attorney for the District of Columbia, where he worked on the prosecution of musician Chris Brown.

In March 2022, following President Biden's announcement of a chief prosecutor during his State of the Union Address, Chambers was selected to serve as director for COVID-19 Fraud Enforcement. In the role, Chambers will manage the COVID-19 Fraud Enforcement Task Force, a multi-agency task force that will include officials from the DOJ, United States Department of Labor, United States Department of the Treasury, United States Department of Homeland Security, Small Business Administration, Pandemic Response Accountability Committee, and others.
