= Robert Hur =

American attorney (born 1973)

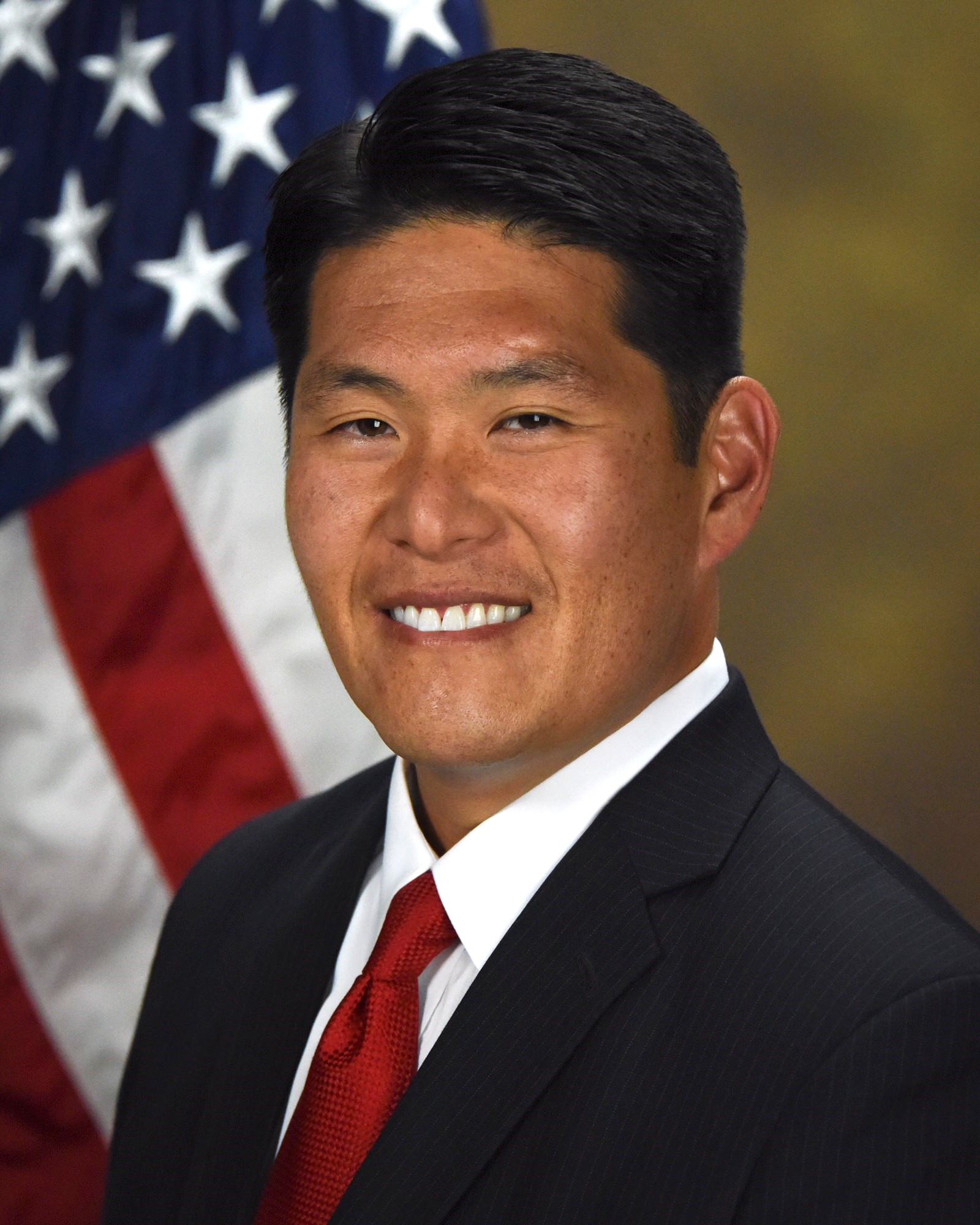
- Official portrait, 2018

Special Counsel for the United States Department of Justice
- In office January 12, 2023 – March 11, 2024
- Appointed by: Merrick Garland

United States Attorney for the District of Maryland
- In office April 9, 2018 – February 15, 2021
- President: Donald Trump; Joe Biden
- Preceded by: Rod Rosenstein
- Succeeded by: Erek Barron

Principal Associate Deputy Attorney General
- In office 2017 – April 2018
- President: Donald Trump
- Preceded by: James Crowell
- Succeeded by: Ed O'Callaghan

Personal details
- Born: Robert Kyoung Hur; 1973 (age 52–53) New York City, U.S.
- Party: Republican
- Children: 3
- Education: Harvard University (BA); King's College, Cambridge (MPhil); Stanford University (JD)

Robert Kyoung Hur (born 1973) is an American lawyer who served as the United States Attorney for the District of Maryland from 2018 to 2021. He previously served as Principal Associate Deputy Attorney General with the U.S. Department of Justice. Hur oversaw the investigation into President Joe Biden's alleged mishandling of classified documents during Biden's time as vice president.

== Early life and education ==
Hur was born in 1973 in New York City to South Korean parents. His father, Young Hur, was an anesthesiologist, and his mother, Haesook Hur, worked as the office manager for her husband's anesthesiology practice. He was raised in Los Angeles where he attended the Harvard School (now Harvard-Westlake School).

Hur studied English and American literature at Harvard College, graduating in 1995 with a Bachelor of Arts, magna cum laude. From 1995 to 1996, Hur did graduate study in philosophy at King's College, Cambridge, receiving first-class honours. From 1996 to 1998, he worked for Boston Consulting Group. He then attended Stanford Law School, where he was the executive editor of the Stanford Law Review and won the school's Kirkwood Moot Court Competition. He graduated in 2001 with a Juris Doctor and membership in the Order of the Coif.

== Career ==
After law school, Hur was a law clerk for Judge Alex Kozinski of the U.S. Court of Appeals for the Ninth Circuit from 2001 to 2002 and for Chief Justice William Rehnquist of the U.S. Supreme Court from 2002 to 2003.

He then served as Special Assistant and Counsel to Christopher A. Wray, then Assistant Attorney General in charge of the Justice Department's Criminal Division. From 2007 to 2014, he served as an Assistant United States Attorney in the District of Maryland, where he prosecuted gang violence, drug trafficking and firearms offenses, and white-collar crimes. He was a partner with King & Spalding in Washington, D.C., where his practice focused on government investigations and complex litigation.

=== United States Attorney ===
Hur rejoined the Department of Justice as Principal Associate Deputy Attorney General, a top aide to Rod Rosenstein after Rosenstein became Deputy Attorney General. He was a liaison to Special Counsel Robert Mueller's investigation of Russian interference in the 2016 election.

On November 1, 2017, Hur was nominated by President Donald Trump to be the next United States Attorney for the District of Maryland. On March 22, 2018, his nomination was reported out of committee by voice vote. He was unanimously confirmed in the US Senate by voice vote later the same day. He was sworn in on April 9, 2018.

On February 3, 2021, Hur announced his resignation, effective February 15. Following his departure from the U.S. Attorney position, Hur became a partner in the Washington, D.C., office of Gibson Dunn, a national law firm.

=== Special Counsel ===
Appointment of Robert K. Hur as Special Counsel

On January 12, 2023, Attorney General Merrick Garland appointed Hur to oversee the United States Department of Justice's investigation into President Joe Biden's alleged mishandling of classified documents during his time as vice president.

Garland notified Congress on February 7, 2024, that Hur had concluded his investigation, and no charges were recommended. In the final report with which Hur concluded his investigation, he stated that he found "evidence that President Biden willfully retained and disclosed classified materials after his vice presidency when he was a private citizen." He concluded that "no criminal charges are warranted in this matter ... even if there was no policy against charging a sitting president", because the "evidence does not establish Mr. Biden's guilt beyond a reasonable doubt." He also cited Biden's memory as a factor, concluding that "Biden would likely present himself to a jury ... as a sympathetic, well-meaning, elderly man with a poor memory." The White House rebuked Hur's characterization as inappropriate, politicized commentary that veered from standards of unbiased, legal analysis. Other Democratic Party voices, such as James Carville and David Axelrod, expressed concern that the report would negatively contribute to Biden's image in the ongoing political conversation about his age in the 2024 presidential election. Associate deputy attorney general Bradley Weinsheimer, the DOJ's senior nonpolitical career official, rejected White House criticisms in an official response, stating that the report's comments "fall well within the department’s standards for public release".

On March 11, 2024, Hur resigned from the Department of Justice. A redacted version of Hur's interview transcript was released on March 12. According to NPR, the transcript painted "a more nuanced portrait of the president than was described in Hur's report". The Associated Press wrote that "the reality of the situation... isn’t as clear as either Biden or Hur portrayed." According to The Washington Post, "Biden doesn’t come across as being as absent-minded as Hur has made him out to be." On the same day, Hur testified about his investigation before the House Judiciary Committee.

In May 2025, audio from Hur's interview was publicly released by Axios. According to The Hill, during the audio Biden "haltingly answered and frequently paused as he seemingly struggled to answer [questions]".

In the 2025 book Original Sin, which detailed President Biden's physical and mental decline, the Special Prosecutor’s' office found a 2017 audio recording of then-former Vice President Biden discussing, with his sister, Val, and his ghostwriter, Mark Zwonitzer, that Biden "found all the classified stuff downstairs". During an in-person interview with the Special Prosecutor’s office, President Biden did not remember the year his son died until he was prompted by Rachel Cotton of the White House Counsel's Office. Because of the report, in February 2024, the White House "declared war on its own Justice Department". During the interview, Hur only asked about the 2017 to 2018 time period and did not bring up Beau Biden. During the presidential debate, when the general public watched what Hur described in his report, Hur, even though he was "vilified for saying", felt sad for Biden. However, one person wrote Hur was vindicated.

=== Return to private practice ===
Hur returned to his old firm, King and Spalding, in September 2024. Hur was hired by Harvard University after the Trump administration threatened the university's federal funding.

== Personal life ==
Hur married Cara Brewer, an attorney, in 2004. They met two years earlier on the Washington, D.C. Metro. They have three children.

Hur has made donations to the campaigns of at least three Republican political candidates, for less than one thousand dollars combined.

== See also ==
- List of law clerks for the chief justice of the United States
