= Rod Rosenstein =

American attorney (born 1965)

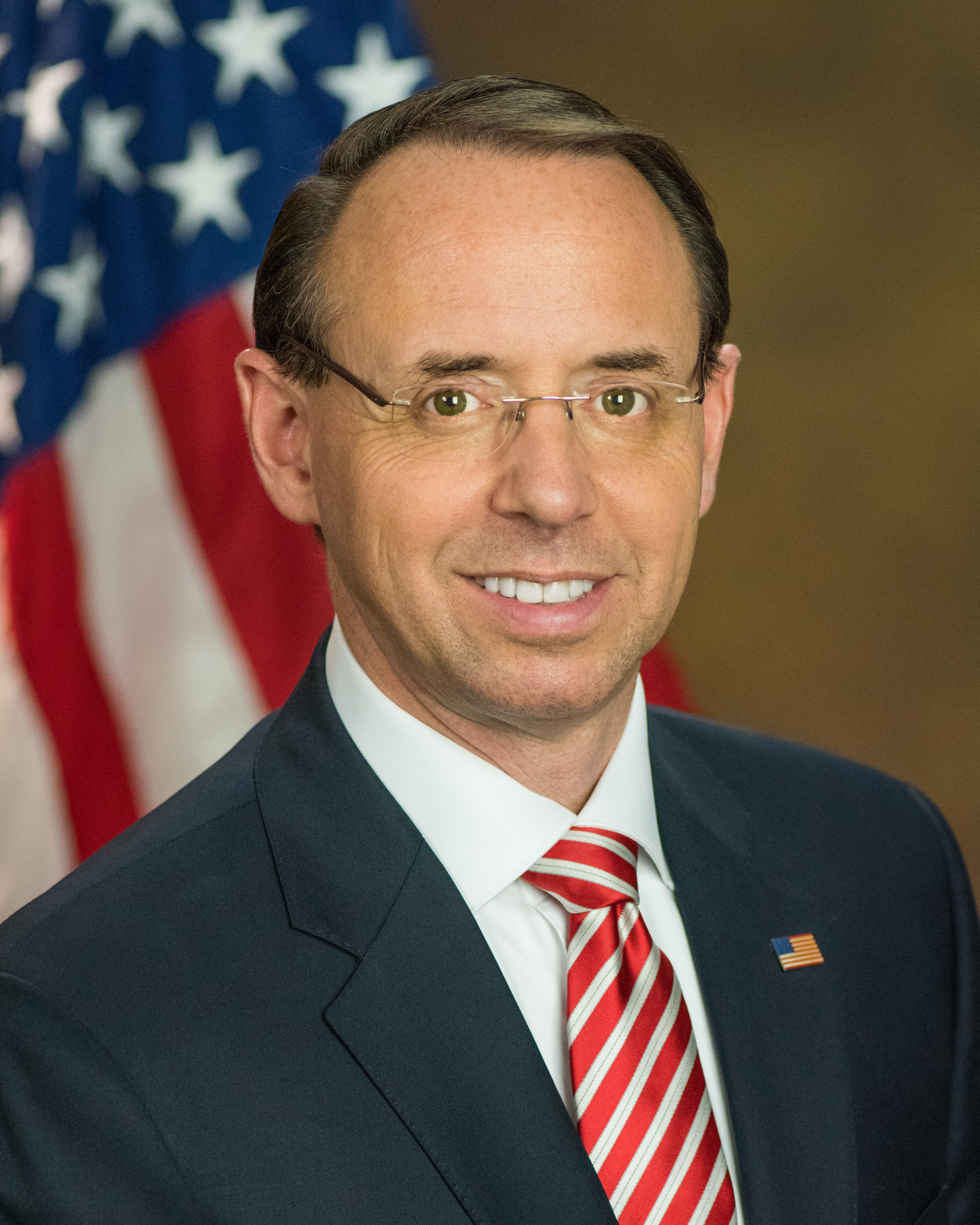
- Official portrait, 2019

Acting United States Attorney General
- In office November 7, 2018
- President: Donald Trump
- Deputy: Himself
- Preceded by: Jeff Sessions
- Succeeded by: Matthew Whitaker (acting)

37th United States Deputy Attorney General
- In office April 26, 2017 – May 11, 2019
- President: Donald Trump
- Attorney General: Jeff Sessions; Matthew Whitaker (acting); William Barr
- Preceded by: Sally Yates
- Succeeded by: Jeffrey A. Rosen

United States Attorney for the District of Maryland
- In office July 12, 2005 – April 26, 2017
- President: George W. Bush; Barack Obama; Donald Trump
- Preceded by: Thomas M. DiBiagio
- Succeeded by: Robert K. Hur

Personal details
- Born: Rod Jay Rosenstein; January 13, 1965 (age 61) Philadelphia, Pennsylvania, U.S.
- Party: Republican
- Spouse: Lisa Barsoomian
- Children: 2
- Relatives: Nancy Messonnier (sister)
- Education: University of Pennsylvania (BS); Harvard University (JD)

Rod Jay Rosenstein (/ˈroʊzənˌstaɪn/; born January 13, 1965) is an American attorney who served as the 37th United States deputy attorney general from 2017 to 2019. Prior to his appointment, he served as the United States attorney for the District of Maryland. At the time of his confirmation as deputy attorney general in April 2017, he was the longest-serving U.S. attorney. Rosenstein had also been nominated to the United States Court of Appeals for the Fourth Circuit in 2007, but his nomination was never considered by the U.S. Senate.

President Donald Trump nominated Rosenstein to serve as Deputy Attorney General on February 1, 2017. Rosenstein was confirmed by the U.S. Senate on April 25, 2017. In May 2017, at Trump's behest, he authored a memo that Trump then cited as the basis for his decision to dismiss FBI Director James Comey.

In May 2018, Rosenstein reportedly told the five U.S. Attorneys in districts along the border with Mexico, where refugees were concerned, that they should not "be categorically declining immigration prosecutions of adults in family units because of the age of a child." The directive, issued as part of the Trump administration family separation policy, led to the separation of thousands of small children from their parents, many of whom were seeking asylum in the United States after fleeing violence in Central America.

Following the recusal of Attorney General Jeff Sessions and Comey's dismissal, Rosenstein appointed Robert Mueller as special counsel to investigate the myriad links between Trump associates and Russian officials and related matters. Rosenstein previously assumed authority over the parallel FBI probe after Sessions recused himself over misleading remarks he made to the Senate Committee on the Judiciary during his confirmation process. The New York Times reported Rosenstein prevented the FBI and Mueller from investigating Trump's personal and financial dealings in Russia. On November 7, 2018, Trump transferred this oversight to acting United States Attorney General Matthew Whitaker. Following the resignation of Jeff Sessions as United States Attorney General at the request of President Donald Trump, Rosenstein also served as acting United States Attorney General in his capacity as United States Deputy Attorney General for a few hours on November 7, 2018, pursuant to 28 U.S.C. § 508, until Trump signed an executive order naming Matthew Whitaker as acting United States Attorney General later that day.

Rosenstein submitted his resignation as deputy attorney general on April 29, 2019, which took effect on May 11, 2019. In 2020, he joined the law firm King & Spalding as a partner in its "Special Matters and Government Investigations" practice.

== Early life and education ==
Rosenstein was born in 1965 to an Ashkenazi Jewish family in Philadelphia. His father, Robert, ran a small business, whilst his mother, Gerri Rosenstein, was a bookkeeper and local school board president. Rod grew up in Lower Moreland Township, Pennsylvania. Rosenstein graduated from Lower Moreland High School. His sister, Nancy Messonnier, is a physician who was the director of the National Center for Immunization and Respiratory Diseases of the Centers for Disease Control and Prevention from 2016 to 2021.

Rosenstein attended the Wharton School of the University of Pennsylvania, graduating in 1986 with a Bachelor of Science, summa cum laude, in economics and Phi Beta Kappa membership. He then attended Harvard Law School, where he was an editor of the Harvard Law Review and graduated in 1989 with a Juris Doctor, cum laude.

== Career ==
=== Early career ===
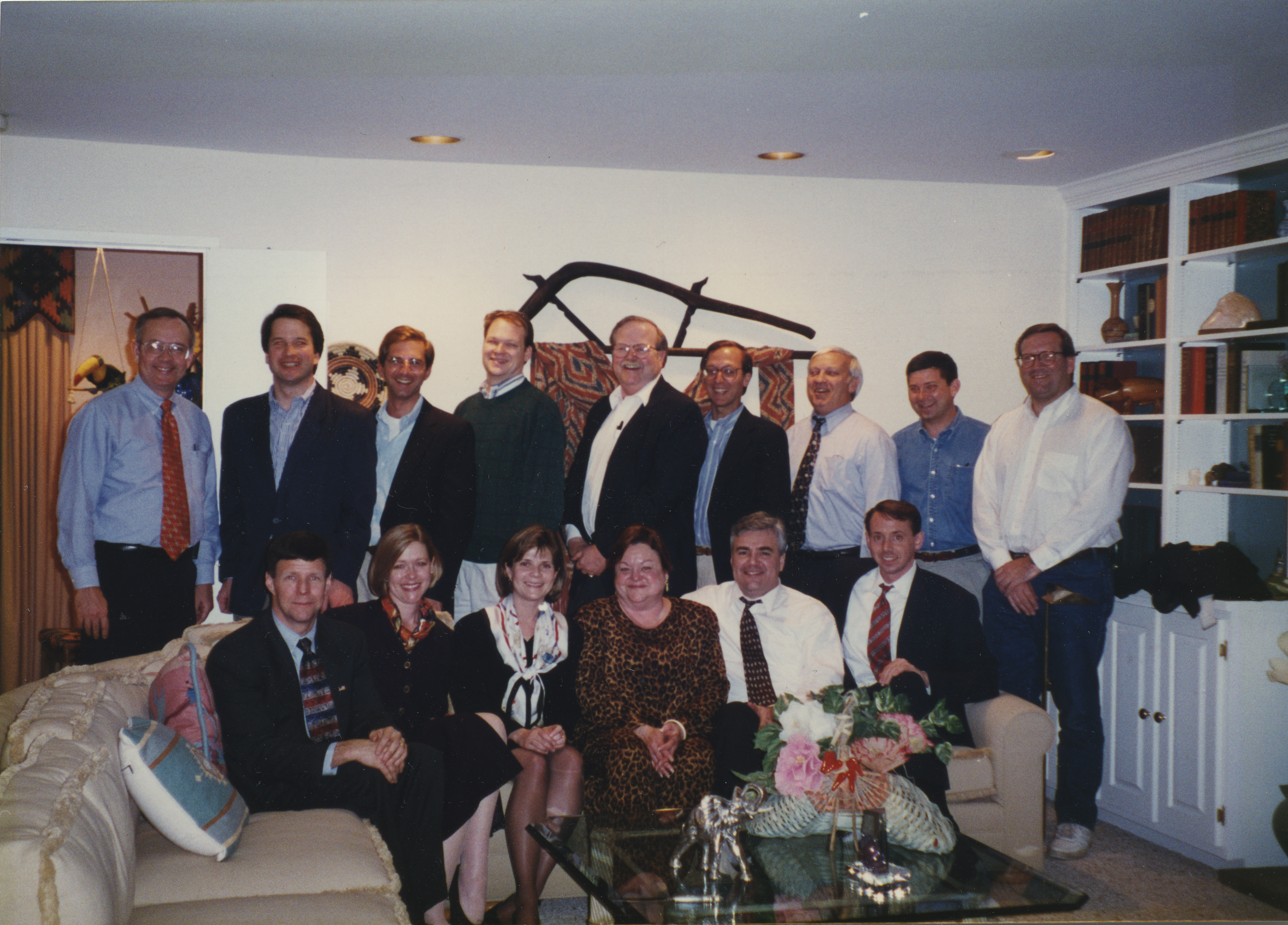
Rosenstein during his time working for the Independent Counsel. Brett Kavanaugh, Alex Azar, Ken Starr, and Amy St. Eve are present.

After law school, Rosenstein was a law clerk to Judge Douglas H. Ginsburg of the U.S. Court of Appeals for the District of Columbia Circuit from 1989 to 1990. He then joined the United States Department of Justice through the Attorney General's Honors Program. From 1990 to 1993, he prosecuted public corruption cases as a trial attorney with the Public Integrity Section of the Criminal Division, the latter of which was led by then Assistant Attorney General Robert Mueller.

During the Clinton Administration, Rosenstein served as counsel to Deputy Attorney General Philip B. Heymann (1993–1994) and Special Assistant to Criminal Division Assistant Attorney General Jo Ann Harris (1994–1995). Rosenstein then worked in the United States Office of the Independent Counsel under Ken Starr on the Whitewater investigation into President Bill Clinton. As an Associate Independent Counsel from 1995 to 1997, he was co-counsel in the trial of three defendants who were convicted of fraud, and he supervised the investigation that found no basis for criminal prosecution of White House officials who had obtained FBI background reports.

United States Attorney Lynne A. Battaglia hired Rosenstein as an Assistant U.S. Attorney for the District of Maryland in 1997.

From 2001 to 2005, Rosenstein served as Principal Deputy Assistant Attorney General for the Tax Division of the United States Department of Justice. He coordinated the tax enforcement activities of the Tax Division, the U.S. Attorneys' Offices and the IRS, and he supervised 90 attorneys and 30 support employees. He oversaw civil litigation and served as the acting head of the Tax Division when Assistant Attorney General Eileen J. O'Connor was unavailable, and he personally briefed and argued civil appeals in several federal appellate courts.

=== U.S. Attorney ===
President George W. Bush nominated Rosenstein to serve as the United States Attorney for the District of Maryland on May 23, 2005. He took office on July 12, 2005, after the U.S. Senate unanimously confirmed his nomination. He was the only U.S. Attorney retained by President Barack Obama.

As United States Attorney, he oversaw federal civil and criminal litigation, assisted with federal law enforcement strategies in Maryland, and presented cases in the U.S. District Court and in the U.S. Court of Appeals for the Fourth Circuit. In 2012, Attorney General Eric Holder directed Rosenstein to investigate leaks regarding the U.S.'s Stuxnet operation, which sabotaged Iran's nuclear program; as a result of the investigation, former U.S. Marine Corps General James Cartwright pleaded guilty to making false statements to the FBI and acknowledged leaking information about the operation to New York Times journalist David E. Sanger. During his tenure as U.S. Attorney, Rosenstein successfully prosecuted leaks of classified information, corruption, murders and burglaries, and was "particularly effective taking on corruption within police departments."

Rosenstein secured several convictions against prison guards in Baltimore for conspiring with the Black Guerrilla Family. He indicted Baltimore police officers Wayne Jenkins, Momodu Gondo, Evodio Hendrix, Daniel Hersl, Jemell Rayam, Marcus Taylor, and Maurice Ward for racketeering. Rosenstein, with the aid of the Bureau of Alcohol, Tobacco and Firearms and the Drug Enforcement Administration, secured convictions in large scale narcotics cases in the District of Maryland, including the arrest and conviction of Terrell Plummer, Richard Christopher Byrd, and Yasmine Geen Young.

The Attorney General appointed Rosenstein to serve on the Advisory Committee of U.S. Attorneys, which evaluates and recommends policies for the Department of Justice. He was vice-chair of the Violent and Organized Crime Subcommittee and a member of the Subcommittees on White Collar Crime, Sentencing Issues and Cyber/Intellectual Property Crime. He also served on the Attorney General's Anti-Gang Coordination Committee.

Attorney General Eric Holder appointed Rosenstein to prosecute General James Cartwright, a former Vice Chairman of the Joint Chiefs of Staff, for leaking to reporters. Cartwright pled guilty, but he was later pardoned.

Rosenstein served as the U.S. Attorney in Maryland during a period in which homicides decreased by approximately one-third, in other words, double the decline at the national level. Additionally, the robbery and aggravated assault rates fell faster than the national average. According to Thiru Vignarajah, the former deputy attorney general of Maryland, "Collaboration between prosecutors, police, and the community combined with a dogged focus on violent repeat offenders was the anchor of Rosenstein's approach." Rosenstein regarded the heroin and opioid epidemic as a public health crisis, hired a re-entry specialist to help ex-offenders adjust to life outside of prison, and prosecuted several individual cases of corrupt police officers.

=== Judicial nomination ===
In 2007, President Bush nominated Rosenstein to a seat on the United States Court of Appeals for the Fourth Circuit. Rosenstein was a Maryland resident at the time. Maryland's Democratic United States Senators, Barbara Mikulski and Ben Cardin, blocked Rosenstein's nomination, claiming he did not have strong enough ties to Maryland.

== Deputy Attorney General of the United States ==
=== Nomination and confirmation ===
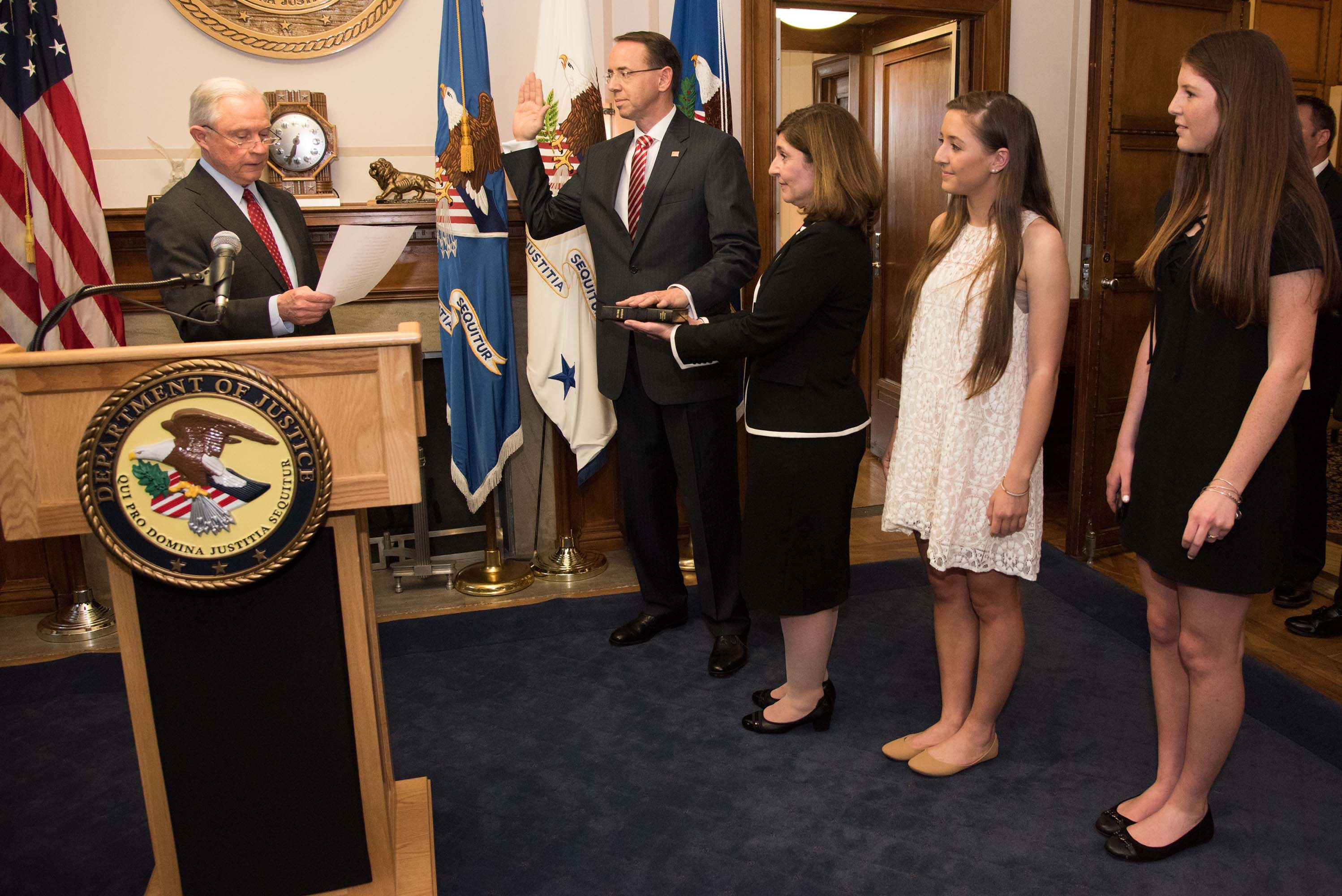
Rosenstein being sworn in as Deputy Attorney General

Appointment of Special Counsel to investigate Russian interference with the 2016 presidential election and related matters

President Trump nominated Rosenstein to serve as Deputy Attorney General on February 1, 2017. He was one of the 46 United States Attorneys ordered on March 10, 2017, to resign by Attorney General Jeff Sessions; Trump declined to accept his resignation. Rosenstein was confirmed by the Senate on April 25, 2017, by a vote of 94–6.

=== Comey memo ===
On May 8, 2017, President Trump directed Sessions and Rosenstein to make a case against FBI Director James Comey in writing. The next day, Rosenstein handed a memo to Sessions providing the basis for Sessions's recommendation to President Trump that Comey be dismissed. In his memo Rosenstein asserted that the FBI must have "a Director who understands the gravity of the mistakes and pledges never to repeat them". He ends with an argument against keeping Comey as FBI director, on the grounds that he was given an opportunity to "admit his errors" but that there is no hope that he will "implement the necessary corrective actions."

Some critics argued that Rosenstein, in enabling the dismissal of Comey amid an investigation into Russian election interference, damaged his own reputation.

After administration officials cited Rosenstein's memo as the main reason for Comey's dismissal, an anonymous source in the White House said that Rosenstein threatened to resign. Rosenstein denied the claim and said he was "not quitting," when asked directly by a reporter from Sinclair Broadcast Group.

On May 17, Rosenstein told the Senate he knew that Comey would be fired before he wrote his memo that the White House initially used as justification for President Trump firing Comey.

The New York Times reported in August 2020 that concerns about a possible counterintelligence threat posed by Trump's personal and financial dealings with Russia increased after his May 9 firing of Comey, prompting the FBI to open an inquiry separate from the Crossfire Hurricane and the incipient Mueller investigation. Within days, Rosenstein curtailed that inquiry, giving the bureau the impression that Mueller would pursue it, though Rosenstein instructed Mueller not to, effectively ending the inquiry.

=== Special counsel appointment ===
On May 17, 2017, Rosenstein appointed Robert Mueller as a special counsel to conduct the investigation into "any links and/or coordination between the Russian government and individuals associated with the campaign of President Donald Trump" as well as any matters arising directly from that investigation. Rosenstein's order authorizes Mueller to bring criminal charges in the event that he discovers any federal crimes. Rosenstein said in a statement, "My decision is not a finding that crimes have been committed or that any prosecution is warranted. I have made no such determination. What I have determined is that based upon the unique circumstances the public interest requires me to place this investigation under the authority of a person who exercises a degree of independence from the normal chain of command."

In an interview with the Associated Press, Rosenstein said he would recuse from supervision of Mueller, if he himself were to become a subject in the investigation due to his role in the dismissal of James Comey. Under that scenario, supervision would have fallen to DOJ's third-ranking official, Associate Attorney General Rachel Brand. Brand resigned on February 20, 2018, leaving the responsibility to Jesse Panuccio.

=== Michael Cohen investigation ===
In April 2018, Rosenstein reportedly personally approved the FBI raid on President Trump's attorney, Michael Cohen, in which the FBI seized emails, tax documents, and records, some of them related to Cohen's payment to adult-film star Stormy Daniels. After interim U.S. Attorney Geoffrey Berman had recused himself, the search was executed by others in the office of the U.S. Attorney for the Southern District of New York and approved by a federal judge.

=== Impeachment articles ===
Eleven House GOP members filed articles of impeachment against Rosenstein on July 25, 2018, alleging he has stonewalled document requests from Congress and he mishandled the 2016 election investigation. Rosenstein has denied the allegations. No such impeachment resolution was brought to the floor, with Ryan and Meadows backing down. Subsequently, it was revealed that Devin Nunes wanted to impeach Rosenstein, but was concerned that attempting to do so would delay the confirmation of Supreme Court nominee Brett Kavanaugh.

=== Alleged 25th Amendment discussions ===
On September 21, 2018, The New York Times reported that Rosenstein suggested, in the spring of 2017 shortly after the dismissal of Comey, that he could secretly tape conversations between himself and Trump. He also allegedly suggested invoking the 25th amendment to attempt to remove Trump from office. Rosenstein strongly denied it, and other reporting suggested he had been sarcastic in his reference to taping Trump. The report gave rise to rumors that he would be fired.

Former FBI deputy director Andrew McCabe stated in a February 2019 60 Minutes interview that during the days after Comey was fired, "the highest levels of American law enforcement were trying to figure out what to do with the president," including the possibility of invoking the 25th Amendment to have Trump removed from office. Rosenstein again denied such discussions occurred.

Rosenstein went to the White House on September 24, where he met with Chief of Staff John Kelly; according to some reports, he offered his resignation. Following the meeting, the White House issued a statement that Rosenstein retained his position as deputy attorney general and would meet with Trump on September 27. Due to the ongoing hearings of Brett Kavanaugh, Rosenstein instead met with Trump on October 8. Further, Rosenstein agreed to meet with House Republicans within the next two weeks.

=== Transfer of Mueller oversight and issuance of report ===
On November 7, 2018, Trump named Matthew Whitaker as acting United States Attorney General, and Whitaker took over the oversight of Mueller's investigation. Oversight of the investigation was later assumed by William Barr upon his confirmation as attorney general.

On March 22, 2019, Mueller released his report to Barr. On March 24, Barr sent a four-page letter to Congressional leaders "summarizing" the Mueller report, although he later said he had not intended the letter as a summary. In it, he said that Mueller had made no determination about whether Trump had committed obstruction of justice, and that Barr and Rosenstein had concluded that the evidence in the report was "not sufficient to establish that the President committed an obstruction-of-justice offense."

In an address at the Yale Club as he was preparing to leave the Justice Department following the release of the Mueller Report, Rosenstein criticized the Obama administration, the FBI, Congress, and the press for their conduct regarding Russian interference in the 2016 United States elections. Rosenstein asserted, "The previous administration chose not to publicize the full story about Russian computer hackers and social media trolls, and how they relate to a broader strategy to undermine America." He asserted that former FBI director James Comey had stated that Trump pressured him to end the investigation into the matter. Rosenstein went on to say, "In politics — as in journalism — the rules of evidence do not apply." He quoted President Trump advocating for the rule of law. He also criticized the FBI and Congress for leaks regarding the investigation.

=== Involvement in Trump administration's family separation policy ===
In May 2018, Rosenstein reportedly told five U.S. Attorneys in districts along the border with Mexico that, where refugees were concerned, they should not "be categorically declining immigration prosecutions of adults in family units because of the age of a child." The directive, issued under Attorney General Jeff Sessions and other Trump Justice Department officials as part of the Trump administration family separation policy, led to the separation of thousands of small children from their parents, many of whom were seeking asylum in the United States after fleeing violence in Central America. Rosenstein insisted that children should be separated from their parents irrespective of the child's age, even if they were infants.

In January 2021, the Inspector General for the Department of Justice concluded an investigation into the policy. The findings led Rosenstein to admit that family separations "should never have been implemented".

=== Departure ===
Rosenstein was expected to step down from his position in mid-March 2019. On February 19, 2019, President Trump announced his intention to nominate Jeffrey A. Rosen for the position of Deputy Attorney General. Rosenstein subsequently resigned effective May 11, 2019.

== Post-government career ==
Rosenstein joined King & Spalding in January 2020, a white-shoe international law firm. He works primarily in assisting clients with federal investigations.

Rosenstein has served as an adjunct professor, teaching classes on federal criminal prosecution at the University of Maryland School of Law and trial advocacy at the University of Baltimore School of Law.

== Personal life ==
Rosenstein is married to Lisa Barsoomian, an Armenian American lawyer who worked for the National Institutes of Health until 2011. They have two daughters. As a government attorney, Barsoomian represented the United States in various matters, including Freedom of Information Act (FOIA) cases, and the FBI's "Carnivore" surveillance system, which monitors and captures e-mail. Rosenstein resides in Bethesda, Maryland.

Rosenstein is a registered Republican.

He was a member of Washington D.C.'s Temple Sinai, a Reform Jewish congregation, from 2008 to 2014. According to a questionnaire that Rosenstein completed ahead of a hearing with the Senate Judiciary Committee, he was a member of a Jewish Community Center's sports league from 1993 to 2012. Rosenstein served on the board of directors of the United States Holocaust Memorial Museum from 2001 to 2011.

== In popular culture ==
Rosenstein was the subject of a song by Ben Folds called "Mr Peepers", a reference to the supposed nickname given to him by President Trump.

Rosenstein was portrayed by actor Scoot McNairy in the Showtime TV miniseries The Comey Rule.

== See also ==
- George W. Bush judicial appointment controversies
- List of Jewish American jurists
- Russian interference in the 2016 United States elections

Legal offices
Preceded by Thomas M. DiBiagio	United States Attorney for the District of Maryland; 2005–2017	Succeeded by Robert K. Hur
Preceded by Jeff Sessions	United States Attorney General; Acting; 2018	Succeeded by Matthew Whitaker; Acting
Preceded by Dana Boente; Acting	United States Deputy Attorney General; 2017–2019	Succeeded by Ed O'Callaghan; Acting
