= New York COVID-19 nursing home scandal =

2021 American political scandal

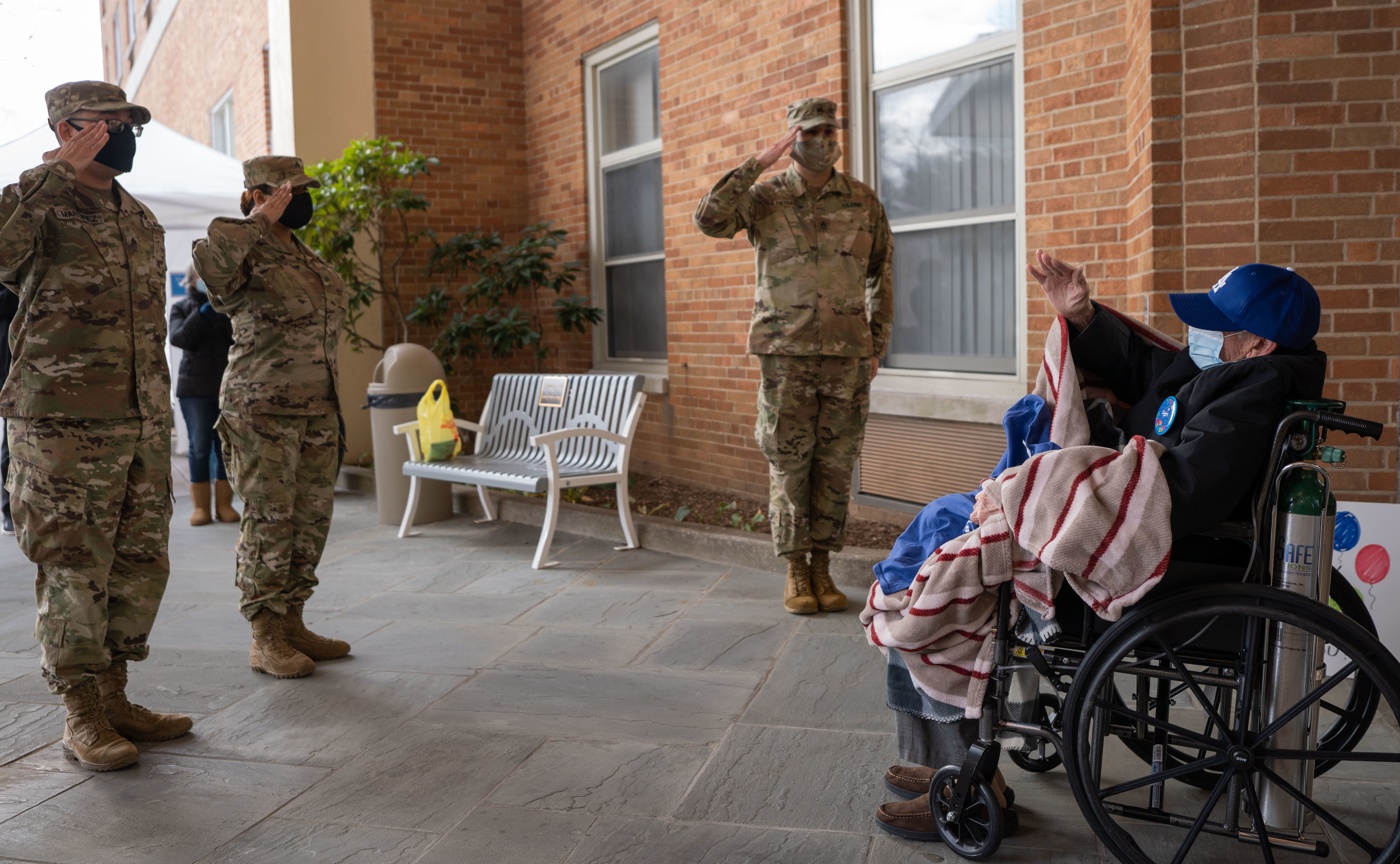
Members of the New York Army National Guard visit a nursing home resident in December 2020

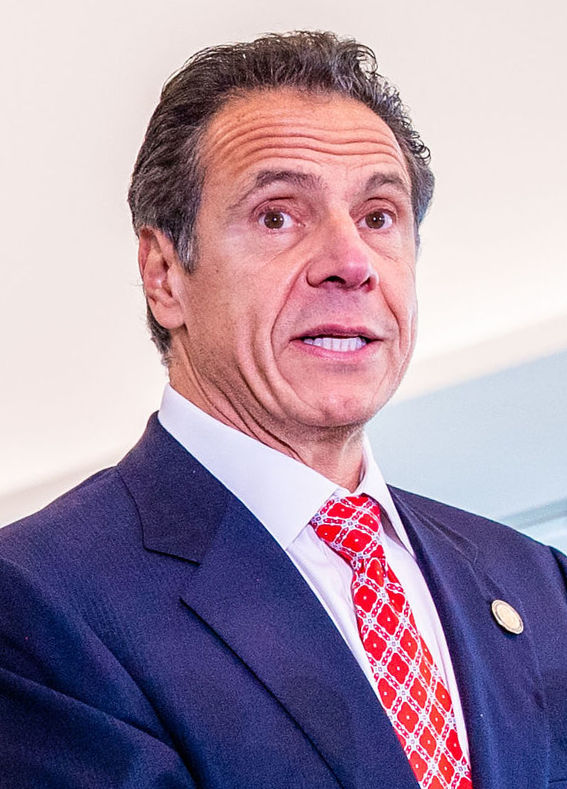
Governor Andrew Cuomo and his staff were in the spotlight after their alleged cover-up of nursing home deaths.

In January 2021, Attorney General of New York Letitia James released a report finding that Governor Andrew Cuomo had understated the toll of COVID-19-related deaths in state nursing homes by as much as 50 percent. The scandal was made public on February 11, 2021, when the New York Post reported that Melissa DeRosa, a secretary and aide to Cuomo, privately apologized to lawmakers for the administration withholding the nursing-home death toll in fear that then-President Donald Trump would "turn this into a giant political football".

The nature of the scandal is widely known as an "alleged cover up". U.S. Attorney Seth DuCharme of the Eastern District of New York and the Federal Bureau of Investigation (FBI) have launched an investigation into New York state's handling of nursing home deaths. The United States Department of Justice began a criminal investigation against Cuomo over the matter in 2025.

== Background ==
=== Cuomo's order ===
On March 7, 2020, New York Governor Andrew Cuomo declared a state of emergency after 89 COVID-19 cases had been confirmed in the state: 70 in Westchester County, 12 in New York City, and seven elsewhere. New York State quickly became the epicenter for the COVID-19 pandemic in the United States. On April 9, 2020, Brooklyn’s Cobble Hill Health Center asked New York State health officials permission to transfer a resident to the nearly empty Javits Center emergency hospital, a request that Cobble Hill says was denied.

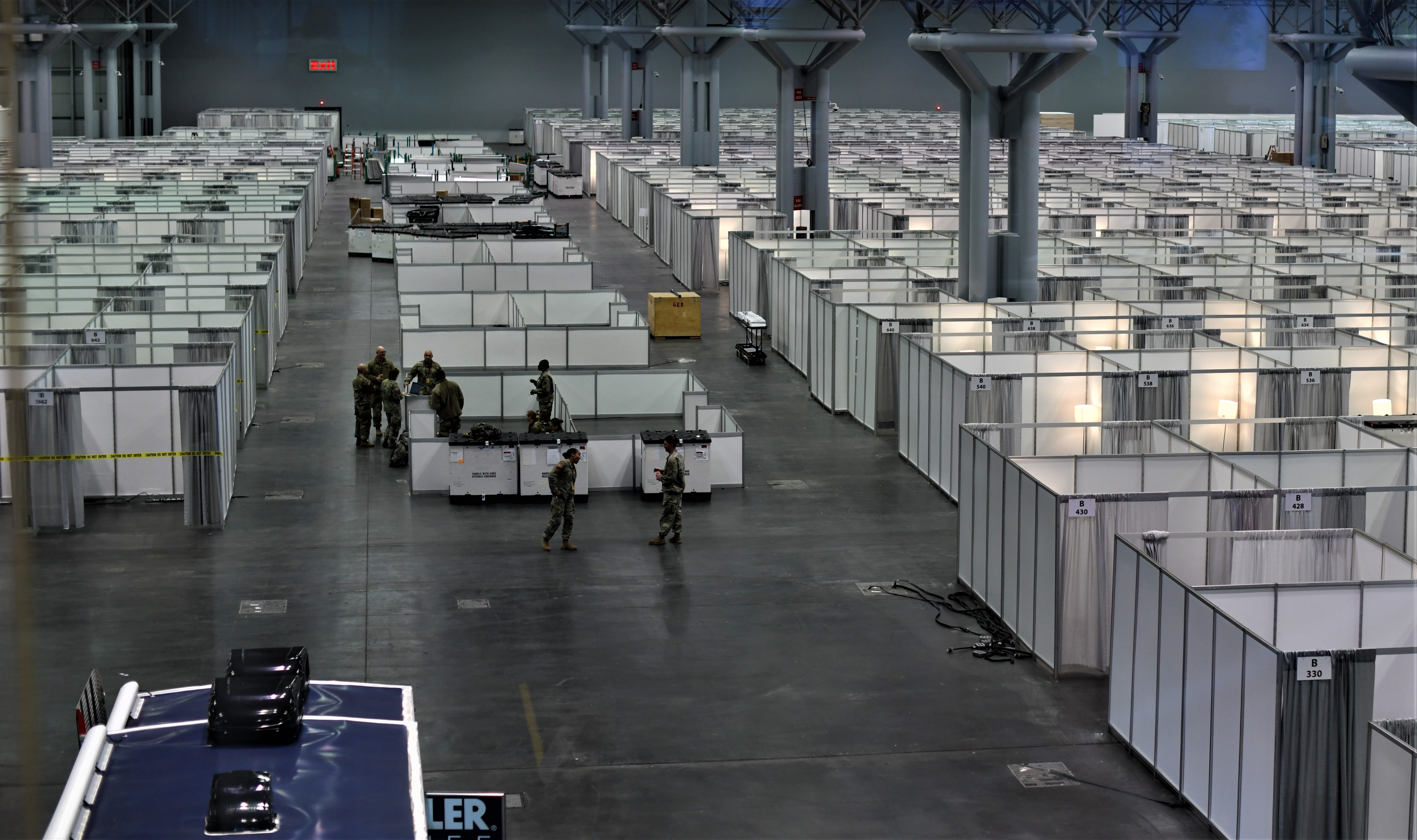
The Javits Center pictured on April 2, 2020, outfitted to care for patients with COVID-19.

Cuomo issued an order on March 25, 2020 that all New York State nursing homes must accept residents that are medically stable. The order further stated that "[n]o resident shall be denied re-admission or admission to the NH [nursing home] solely based on a confirmed or suspected diagnosis of COVID-19".

On May 10, 2020, Cuomo rescinded the previous order issued on March 25, which directed nursing homes to admit patients carrying COVID-19. Cuomo repeatedly stated that the order was based on CDC guidance issued by the Trump administration. PolitiFact rated that statement as "mostly false" because the guidelines issued by the CDC and CMS indicated that a medically stable COVID-19 patient could be discharged from a hospital to a nursing home "only if the nursing home can implement all recommended infection control procedures." The Associated Press reported on May 21, 2020, that over 4,500 patients who were recovering from COVID-19 were sent to New York State nursing homes. The report was compiled after the New York State Department of Health failed to release its own two weeks earlier.

During the initial outset of the pandemic, Cuomo received accolades for his response to COVID-19. His name was floated as a possible replacement of Joe Biden as the 2020 Democratic presidential nominee due to his newfound popularity. He launched daily COVID-19 press briefings which saw early acclaim, but often announced new pandemic policy and then required health officials "match their health guidance to the announcements."

=== New York State Department of Health’s report ===
On July 6, 2020, the New York State Department of Health released a report stating that most deaths in nursing homes were from asymptomatic spread by staff and visitors. Following the report's release, Andrew Cuomo held a press conference in which he stated criticism of nursing home deaths "has no basis in fact. It was pure politics and it was ugly politics. And now the report has the facts, and the facts tell the exact opposite story."

According to a February 2021 study conducted by the Empire Center for Public Policy, the March 25 order "was not the sole or primary cause of the heavy death toll in nursing homes," however it did find it "was associated with a statistically significant increase in resident deaths." This contradicted the July 6 report, which claimed "[a]dmission policies were not a significant factor in nursing home fatalities".

=== July 2020 press conference ===
At a press conference held on July 24, 2020, Cuomo dismissed a reporter's question about appointing an independent investigator to the COVID-19 deaths within nursing homes as politically motivated by conservative media outlets. Cuomo stated:

Yeah. I don’t believe your characterization is correct. I believe it is a political issue. I think it’s the New York Post. I think it’s Michael Goodwin. I think it’s Bob McManus. I think it’s FOX TV. I think it is all politically motivated. If anybody looked at the facts, they would know that it was wholly absurd on its face. People died in nursing homes. That’s very unfortunate. Just on the top line, we are number 35th in the nation in percentage of deaths in nursing homes. Go talk to 34 other states first. Go talk to the Republican states now. Florida, Texas, Arizona. Ask them what is happening in nursing homes. It’s all politics.

== Undercounting deaths ==
=== New York Attorney General's report ===
On January 28, 2021, New York State Attorney General (OAG) Letitia James issued a report that the New York State Department of Health (DOH) had undercounted the total deaths from COVID-19 within nursing homes by 50 percent. James stated, "[p]reliminary data obtained by OAG suggests that many nursing home residents died from COVID-19 in hospitals after being transferred from their nursing homes, which is not reflected in DOH's published total nursing home death data." In the weeks following this report, the death toll of long-term care residents within the state had gone up from 8,500 to 15,000.

=== Melissa DeRosa leaked statement ===
On February 12, 2021, the New York Post released audio of Cuomo's secretary Melissa DeRosa apologizing to New York Democratic leadership in a video conference. In the audio, DeRosa said that they had intentionally withheld August 2020 nursing home death data from state legislators out of concern that the Trump administration would use the information against the Cuomo administration and gain political advantage in the 2020 election. DeRosa stated:

Basically, we froze because then we were in a position where we weren’t sure if what we were going to give to the Department of Justice or what we give to you guys and what we start saying was going to be used against us, and we weren’t sure if there was going to be an investigation.

NBC News reported on DeRosa's leaked comments, saying they were the catalyst for the federal investigation.

=== Rewriting of nursing home report ===
On March 4, 2021, interviews and reports from The New York Times found that several of Cuomo's aides, Melissa DeRosa, Linda Lacewell and Jim Malatras had rewritten a report from state health officials to omit 9,250 COVID-19 deaths among nursing home residents. Following Attorney General Letitia James' January report that first exposed the cover-up, Cuomo's administration released complete data, including the nursing home deaths, and cited the possibility of a politically-motivated investigation from the Department of Justice as a justification. "Interviews with six people with direct knowledge of the discussions" found that conflicts between Cuomo's aides and top state health officials had begun long before the report was first released, resulting in 9 health officials resigning, in response to Cuomo's "war on his own public health bureaucracy." Beth Garvey, a special counsel, argued that "the out-of-facility data was omitted after D.O.H. could not confirm it had been adequately verified", and that they would have had no effect on the conclusions of the Health Department's July 2020 report finding Cuomo's policies not to blame for the deaths.

=== New York State Assembly report ===
In November 2021, a report by the New York State Assembly found that Cuomo's executive chamber had "substantially revised" the report to exclude deaths of nursing home residents at hospitals in order to boost Cuomo's reputation.

== Reactions ==
Following the report released by New York Attorney General Letitia James, bipartisan criticism emerged toward Andrew Cuomo and his handling of the pandemic.

=== Media ===
The New York Daily News editorial board criticized Cuomo, writing that while Cuomo and his administration were not "personally liable" for COVID-19 deaths in New York, it was "difficult to excuse" the Cuomo administration actions in delaying the release of "the full count of nursing home and other adult care facility deaths" and having "misled New Yorkers about the reason for the delay." The paper's editorial board added, "The cover-up is always worse than the crime. For this one, executed via repeated misleading statements to the public, there must be consequences, starting with a better explanation and some true contrition from Cuomo."

James Freeman, an editorial writer at the Wall Street Journal, criticized Cuomo for "his reckless policy of forcing vulnerable populations to accept greater risk of infection—and then hiding the results" and wrote that withholding "crucial information from public disclosure" was a "custom" of the New York state government under Cuomo.

CNN anchor Chris Cuomo, the host of Cuomo Prime Time, had been subject to a rule that CNN put in place in 2013 that prevented him from interviewing or covering his brother Andrew Cuomo. During the early days of the COVID-19 pandemic, CNN made an exception to the rule to allow Chris Cuomo to interview his brother on pandemic matters, saying, "The early months of the pandemic crisis were an extraordinary time. We felt that Chris speaking with his brother about the challenges of what millions of American families were struggling with was of significant human interest." The on-air discussions between the brothers involved both "serious pandemic talk" and "family banter." However, Chris Cuomo's show did not cover the subsequent nursing home controversy, with CNN saying the rule against Cuomo covering his brother "remains in place today." Axios stated that the omission "raises questions about whether the governor should have ever appeared" on his brother's show. Erik Wemple, a media critic for the Washington Post, criticized CNN's decision to allow a conflict of interest, writing that "in 'unusual times,' principles of journalism merit even more rigorous adherence, not an expedient suspension" and "You can't nullify a rule when your star anchor's brother is flying high, only to invoke it during times of scandal."

Prior to the report released by New York Attorney General Letitia James, Andrew Cuomo had received the International Emmy Founders Award from the International Academy of Television Arts and Sciences for his COVID-19 press briefings. After the report, several New York lawmakers sought to have his Emmy revoked. On August 24, 2021, the Academy revoked his award, due to sexual harassment allegations, however, and not due to the nursing home scandal.

=== New York politicians ===
Former Governor George Pataki lambasted Andrew Cuomo in February 2021, saying the "cover-up is worse than the crime". New York City Mayor Bill de Blasio called for further investigations into Cuomo and his administration's handling of the crisis. Assemblymember Ron Kim told the New York Post he believed Cuomo committed "obstruction of criminal investigations of health care offenses". He also said Cuomo had personally called him and told him he'd "destroy" him for criticizing his administration. When asked for comment on Kim's allegation, de Blasio called it "classic Andrew Cuomo" in an interview with Morning Joe on MSNBC. On February 12, 2021, more legislators criticized Cuomo, with 14 Democratic state senators joining the Republican Senate minority in calling for Cuomo's emergency powers to be rescinded.

On March 5, 2021, the New York legislature voted 43–20 in the Senate and 107–43 in the Assembly to strip Cuomo of his emergency powers. Some legislators felt the move came too late and stated that they preferred that Cuomo be impeached instead; legislators expressing this view included Democratic Assemblymember Charles Barron and Republican Senator Fred Akshar.

On March 11, 2021, the New York legislature launched an impeachment inquiry into Cuomo, both for his role in undercounting nursing home deaths and for several sexual harassment allegations recently reported against him. At that point, 59 Democrats within the Senate and Assembly had signed onto a statement demanding Cuomo's resignation.

=== Federal politicians ===
U.S. Representative Elise Stefanik from New York's 21st congressional district called for a federal investigation into the Cuomo administration as early as May 2020. President Donald Trump called for an investigation via Twitter in September 2020, "@NYGovCuomo should get his puppet New York prosecutors, who have been illegally after me and my family for years, to investigate his incompetent handling of the China Virus, and all of the deaths caused by this incompetence. It is at minimum a Nursing Home Scandal – 11,000 DEAD!" Following the attorneys general report, U.S. Representative Nicole Malliotakis from New York's 11th congressional district began to circulate a petition calling for Cuomo to resign. U.S. Representative Antonio Delgado from New York's 19th congressional district also called for an investigation into Cuomo, saying those who lost loved ones "deserve answers and accountability". On February 19, 2021, U.S. Representative Alexandria Ocasio-Cortez from New York's 14th congressional district stated, “I support our state’s return to co-equal governance and stand with our local officials calling for a full investigation of the Cuomo administration’s handling of nursing homes during COVID-19."

=== Andrew Cuomo's denial of cover-up ===
On February 15, 2021, Cuomo defended his handling of the crisis. He claimed that New York state did not cover-up the number of deaths in nursing homes, but acknowledged that officials should have released the information earlier. He said that “New York was ground zero for COVID, and nursing homes were and still are ground zero for COVID." In regards to allegations of threatening Assembly member Ron Kim, Richard Azzopardi, a spokesman for Cuomo, said Kim was "lying", adding, "I know because I was one of three other people in the room when the phone call occurred. At no time did anyone threaten to 'destroy' anyone with their 'wrath' nor engage in a ‘cover-up."

Allies of Cuomo cited approval ratings as evidence of his competence; on February 15, Jay S. Jacobs, the chairman of the New York State Democratic Committee, said that "despite the best efforts of the far fringe, Governor Cuomo's popularity remains unchanged; 11 months into global pandemic, 61% of voters approve of his response", citing a poll taken between February 7 and 11. As a counterpoint to that claim, Slate credited the high numbers to Democrats "celebrating the idea of the competent blue-state governor [as] more important than reckoning with the reality of a serially underachieving chief executive playing three-card monte with dead bodies." As criticism intensified, Cuomo's approval began to see sharp declines, with a Marist College poll showing Cuomo underwater with 49%, down from a high of 66% in July.

== Federal investigation ==
On February 17, 2021, Times Union reported that U.S. Attorney Seth DuCharme of the Eastern District of New York and the Federal Bureau of Investigation (FBI) had launched an investigation into New York state's handling of nursing home deaths. The Eastern District (rather than the Southern District) is handling the investigation because Audrey Strauss, the U.S. Attorney for the Southern District, is the mother-in-law of Cuomo aide Melissa DeRosa, meaning that Strauss would have to recuse herself from any involvement in the investigation. During his confirmation for the position of U.S. attorney general, Merrick Garland said "[w]ith all of these investigations, the Justice Department is open to evidence of fraud, false statements, violations of the law," in regards to the federal investigation into Cuomo and his administration.

In light of the investigation, on March 5, 2021, Republican staff of the U.S. House Committee on Ways and Means scheduled a meeting with the Centers for Disease Control and Prevention (CDC) and the Centers for Medicare & Medicaid Services (CMS) to inquire what improvements need to be made regarding tracking of COVID-19 and whether the agencies possess the capabilities to catch future instances of COVID-19 death manipulation. Democratic staff members were offered an invitation by the Republican staff to attend.

On March 19, 2021, The FBI reported that an investigation was underway on Governor Andrew Cuomo for improperly using the power of his office to shield nursing home executive political donors from COVID-19 lawsuits.

On October 30, 2024 the Select Subcommittee on the Coronavirus Pandemic in the US House Oversight Committee on Oversight and Government Reform made a criminal referral to the US Department of Justice and then attorney general Merrick Garland, accusing Cuomo of making "criminally false statements" during closed-door testimony in a June 2024 hearing. The Department of Justice did not proceed on the referral. On April 21, 2025, the subcommittee made a criminal referral on the same matter to Attorney General Pam Bondi.

== See also ==
- Impact of the COVID-19 pandemic on long-term care facilities
- Timeline of the COVID-19 pandemic in the United States
- COVID-19 pandemic in New York City – for impact in New York City
- COVID-19 pandemic in North America – for impact on the continent
- COVID-19 pandemic – for impact on other countries
- Political impact of the COVID-19 pandemic
- Andrew Cuomo sexual harassment allegations – adjacent scandal involving Andrew Cuomo
