= Matthew S. Axelrod =

American lawyer

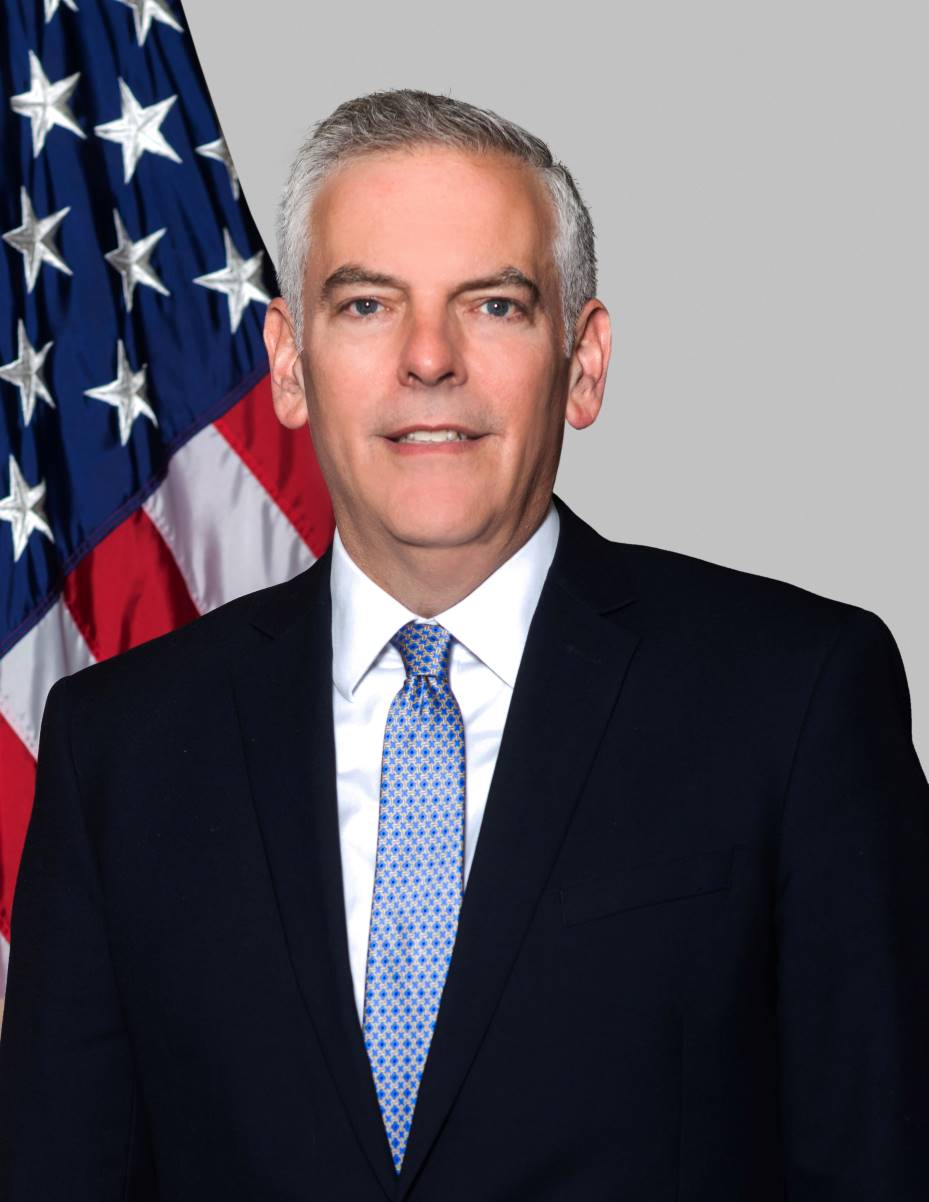

Assistant Secretary of Commerce for Export Enforcement
- In office January 3, 2022 – January 2025
- President: Joe Biden

Personal details
- Education: Amherst College (BA); Yale Law School (JD)

Matthew S. Axelrod is an American lawyer. He served as assistant secretary for export enforcement at the U.S. Department of Commerce's Bureau of Industry and Security in the Biden administration.

== Education ==
Axelrod holds a BA from Amherst College and a JD from Yale Law School.

== Career ==
Axelrod was a partner at Linklaters from March 2017 to December 2020. He joined the U.S. Justice Department as a senior counselor in January 2021. The Biden administration nominated Axelrod as assistant secretary for export enforcement in August 2021. He was confirmed by the U.S. Senate in December 2021.

In February 2025, Axelrod joined Gibson Dunn as a DC-based partner co-charing its new Sanctions and Export Enforcement Practice Group.

== Publications ==
=== Articles ===
- How Section 702 Surveillance Helps Keep Sensitive U.S. Technologies From China, Russia, Iran and North Korea, Just Security, September 30, 2023
