= Aakash Singh =

American attorney

Aakash Singh (1992/1993) is an associate deputy attorney general in the second Donald Trump administration. Singh has been characterized as an important figure in aligning federal prosecutors with Trump's political agenda. He has instructed federal prosecutors that Trump is their "chief client." He pressured U.S. attorneys offices to pursue criminal charges against anti-Trump protestors.

== Early life ==
Singh was raised in New Jersey and Florida. His parents migrated to the United States from India. He graduated with a law degree from George Washington University in 2017.

Singh was a congressional aide to Chuck Grassley. Singh is a former federal prosecutor. In 2021, he pleaded guilty to driving under the influence.

== Second Trump administration ==
Singh's promotion in the second Trump administration after being endorsed by Mike Davis, an informal legal advisor to Trump. Trump ally Ed Martin referred to Singh as "The Great One" in May 2025.

In 2025, Singh issued a memo instructing U.S. attorneys offices to investigate a group funded by George Soros. In 2026, Democratic lawmakers said they had a whistleblowers complaint that Singh had pressured prosecutors to pursue a case against the Southern Poverty Law Center. Singh instructed federal prosecutors to prioritize criminal cases related to protests against mass deportation during the second Trump administration and to make sure to publicize those cases.

Singh helped Lindsay Halligan, a Trump loyalist who was placed by Trump in the Eastern Virginia US attorney’s office to pursue flawed cases against Trump's perceived foes, including James Comey. A Tennessee federal judge’s order suggested that Singh had directed that Kilmar Abrego Garcia be indicted for human smuggling.

Citing NSPM-7, Singh led efforts by the Justice Department to surveil progressive organizations, labor unions, and other groups opposed to the Trump administration's immigration policy.

In 2026, The New York Times reported that Singh was involved in suppressing an investigation into the circumstances of Trump's pardoning of David Gentile, a convicted fraudster behind a $1.6 billion scheme to defraud mom-and-pop investors.

In September 2026, Bloomberg Law reported that Singh was promoted to principal associate deputy attorney general, overseeing operations at DOJ field offices and the litigating divisions within department headquarters. He is widely believed to be the youngest person to ever hold this senior position within the DOJ.
