= Jeffrey A. Rosen =

American lawyer (born 1958)

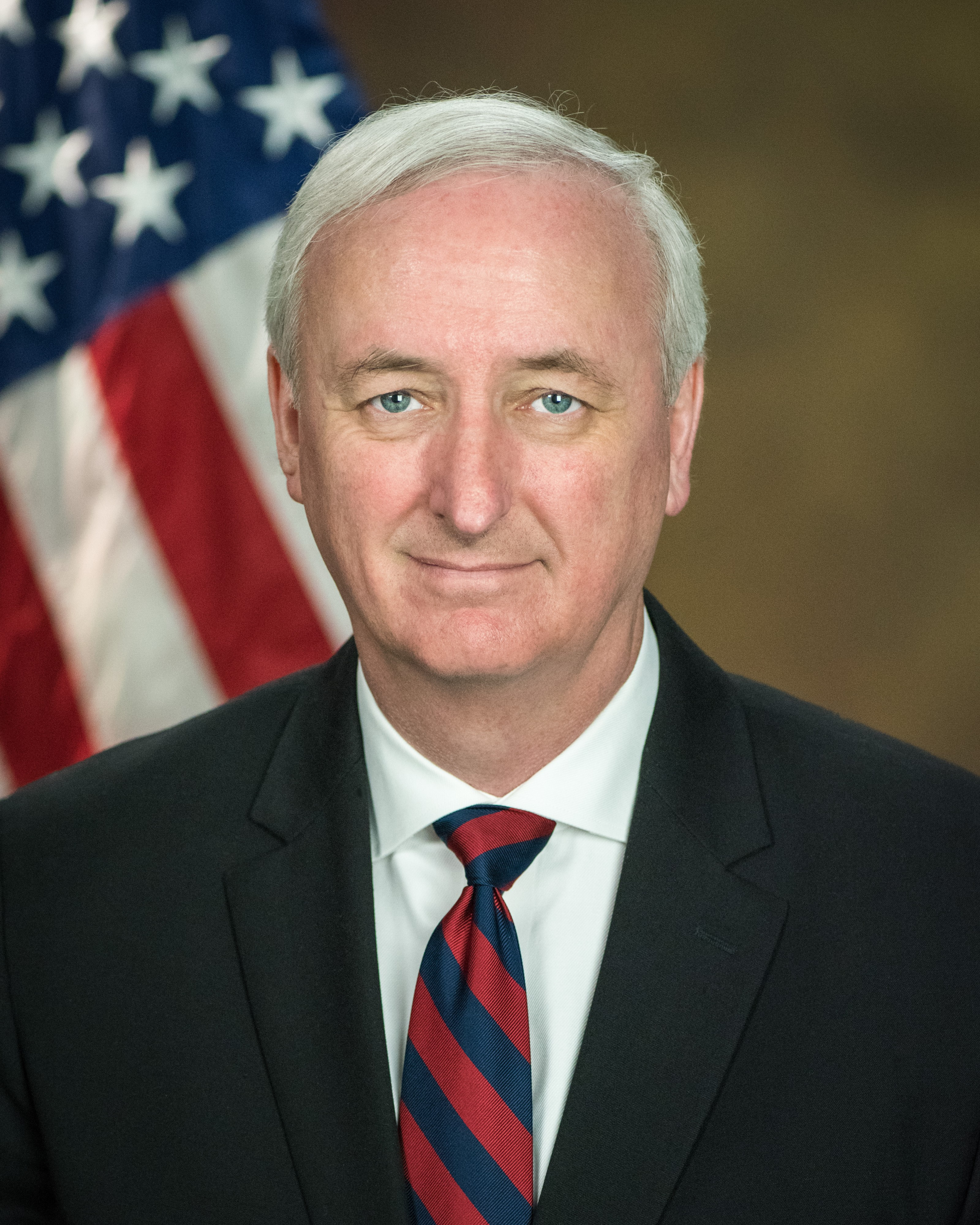
- Official portrait, 2019

Acting United States Attorney General
- In office December 24, 2020 – January 20, 2021
- President: Donald Trump
- Deputy: Richard Donoghue (acting)
- Preceded by: William Barr
- Succeeded by: John Demers (acting)

38th United States Deputy Attorney General
- In office May 22, 2019 – December 23, 2020
- President: Donald Trump
- Attorney General: William Barr
- Preceded by: Rod Rosenstein
- Succeeded by: Lisa Monaco

12th United States Deputy Secretary of Transportation
- In office May 18, 2017 – May 21, 2019
- President: Donald Trump
- Secretary: Elaine Chao
- Preceded by: Victor Mendez
- Succeeded by: Polly Trottenberg

General Counsel of the United States Department of Transportation
- In office October 2003 – June 2006
- President: George W. Bush
- Preceded by: Kirk Van Tine
- Succeeded by: David Gribbin

Personal details
- Born: Jeffrey Adam Rosen; April 2, 1958 (age 68) Boston, Massachusetts, U.S.
- Party: Republican
- Spouse: Kathleen Nichols
- Children: 3
- Education: Northwestern University (BA); Harvard University (JD)

Jeffrey Adam Rosen (born April 2, 1958) is an American lawyer who served as acting United States attorney general from December 2020 to January 2021 and as United States deputy attorney general from 2019 to 2020. Before joining the Department of Justice, he was a senior partner at the law firm Kirkland & Ellis and was the United States deputy secretary of transportation.

== Early life and education ==
Rosen was born to a Jewish family in Boston and grew up in Brockton, Massachusetts. Rosen attended Brockton High School, where he was editor of the high school newspaper. His parents were not college graduates, but he has said that they wanted him to become one.

He graduated from Northwestern University with a Bachelor of Arts in economics in 1979 after serving as president of the student council in his third and final year of college. He then graduated magna cum laude from Harvard Law School, receiving his Juris Doctor in 1982. Other notable political figures from his Harvard Law School class included future U.S. Attorney General Alberto Gonzales (2005–2007), future Massachusetts Governor Deval Patrick, and future U.S. Senator from Rhode Island Jack Reed.

== Career ==
Rosen joined Kirkland & Ellis in 1982 as an associate in the firm's Washington, D.C. office. Rosen became a partner in 1988, at age 30. He served in several management roles thereafter, and was elected to the firm's global management committee in 1999, at age 41. He handled complex business litigation for major companies like GM, AOL, Netscape, Marriott, and others.

He left the firm in 2003 and began working for the U.S. government.

After his public service, he returned to Kirkland & Ellis in 2009, and in total worked there for nearly 30 years. In 2017, he returned to federal government service, serving as deputy secretary of the Department of Transportation. In May 2019, he moved to the Department of Justice as deputy attorney general, and from December 24, 2020, to January 20, 2021, as acting attorney general. As of July 2021 he is a nonresident fellow at the American Enterprise Institute. In May 2022, he was appointed to chair Virginia's Commission to Combat Antisemitism, which issued its report in December 2022.

He was elected to be a member of the American Law Institute in 1996.

Beginning in 1996, through 2003, Rosen was an adjunct professor at Georgetown University Law Center, where he taught professional responsibility (legal ethics).

From 2015 to 2016, Rosen served as the elected chair of the American Bar Association's Section of Administrative Law and Regulatory Practice.

=== DOT general counsel ===
From 2003 to 2006, after unanimous confirmation by the US Senate, Rosen was appointed general counsel at the United States Department of Transportation and acted as counsel for then-Transportation Secretary Norman Mineta. Mineta had previously been President Bill Clinton's Secretary of Commerce, and he was the only Democrat in the George W. Bush Cabinet. He was also the first Asian-American member of a President's Cabinet.

During those years, Rosen oversaw the wide-ranging activities of more than 400 lawyers, while also playing a senior management role in a department with a total budget of approximately $60 billion. Among other things, Rosen led DOT regulatory reform efforts, to achieve regulatory objectives in more efficient and less costly ways.

In 2005–2006, Rosen was also designated as the government's representative on the Amtrak Board of Directors. While serving as General Counsel at DOT, Rosen also testified before Congress on numerous occasions on a wide range of subjects, including Amtrak.

=== OMB general counsel and senior policy advisor ===
In 2006, Rosen moved to the White House Office of Management and Budget, where he was general counsel and senior policy advisor until 2009. At OMB, he reported to the Budget director, Rob Portman, who later became US Senator from Ohio. At OMB, Rosen had a wide portfolio, assisting Portman with agency budgets and appropriations, and advising Portman and President Bush about regulatory issues and executive orders. He later published a journal article about "Putting Regulators on a Budget".

While at the OMB, he criticized "regulatory overreach" and opposed EPA plans to regulate greenhouse gas emissions.

=== Federal judicial nomination ===
In 2008, President Bush nominated Rosen to become a federal judge in Washington D.C. The American Bar Association reported to then-Senate Judiciary Committee chairman Patrick Leahy that their evaluation had unanimously given Rosen their highest rating. Because it was an election year, with the opposition party in control of the Senate, the Senate Judiciary Committee failed to give his nomination a hearing and vote, and the nomination lapsed at the end of the year.

During the 2012 presidential election, media accounts indicated that Rosen was likely to be considered for a role in a new administration had Mitt Romney defeated Barack Obama. Nonetheless, during the Obama administration, Rosen was then appointed as a Public Member of the Administrative Conference of the United States. During the Biden administration, Rosen was again appointed to the Administrative Conference of the United States.

In 2016, President Obama nominated Rosen to serve on the Board of Governors of the US Postal Service. He was unanimously approved in the Senate Homeland Security Committee, but that nomination did not receive a full Senate vote before the election. After the 2016 election, he received a different nomination.

=== Deputy Secretary of Transportation ===
In February 2017, Rosen was announced as the nominee for United States Deputy Secretary of Transportation. After Senate Democrats announced resistance to most senior nominees, on May 16, 2017, Rosen was confirmed as Deputy Transportation Secretary by a 56–42 vote. There, he served under Secretary Elaine Chao. Elaine Chao was previously Secretary of Labor during 2001–2008, and was previously Deputy Secretary of Transportation during the George H.W. Bush administration, among numerous other public service positions. She was the first Asian-American woman to serve in a President's Cabinet. Rosen's appointment as her second-in-command was well received by transportation stakeholders.

During his tenure, he chaired DOT's New and Emerging Technologies Council (NETT) formed by Elaine Chao and was an ex-officio member of FAA's Management Advisory Council, as the FAA Administrator reported to him and the Secretary. Rosen also helped to lead DOTs efforts to safely enable the use of drones in the airspace, including in FAA's drone pilot program. He also had DOT issue updated guidelines on automated or “self-driving” cars and trucks. He also helped with FAA's successful efforts to reform its regulations and restore the US lead in enabling the largest number of private commercial space launches.

Rosen helped implement other key DOT priorities, including new infrastructure, both with regard to existing federal grant programs and new legislation. He also served as Chair of DOT's council on credit and finance, which makes loans to infrastructure projects. Among his other roles was to serve as Chair of DOT's Regulatory Reform Task Force. It has been reported that he was focused on improving the infrastructure permitting process, and reforming the regulatory system to reduce costs.

=== Deputy Attorney General ===
On February 19, 2019, President Donald Trump announced his intention to nominate Rosen for the position of United States Deputy Attorney General, succeeding Rod Rosenstein upon his departure from the Department of Justice. Numerous organizations and individuals submitted letters of support for his nomination, including police and sheriff organizations, state attorneys general, former DOJ officials, and a former Inspector General.

Senator Rob Portman introduced and endorsed Rosen at his Senate hearing, and Rosen was confirmed by the U.S. Senate on May 16 by a vote of 52–45. In private law practice, Rosen had handled high-stakes litigation in courts all across the country, and 19 of the 37 previous deputy attorneys general had been civil lawyers and not prosecutors, but some in the Senate claimed that his nomination to become the second-highest law enforcement official was unusual, as Rosen had no previous prosecutorial experience. Attorney General William Barr had urged Trump to choose Rosen as his deputy. Rosen was sworn in on May 22, 2019.

The Wall Street Journal described Rosen as having "kept a relatively low profile both within the department and in public." PBS reported him as being described as "someone who would 'put his head down and get the job done without seeking the spotlight'.”

Rosen guided initiatives, including an antitrust review of online technology platforms, criminal and civil opioids enforcement and legislation, counter-UAS measures to facilitate the safe use of drones, redress of pandemic-related fraud, and reform of regulatory and administrative law, among others. He also oversaw efforts to address investigations and prosecutions of overseas cyber hackers and foreign trade secret theft, and to address hate crimes, including those involving antisemitism.

In June 2019, Rosen addressed correspondence between counsel for Paul Manafort and NY prosecutors about an apparent disagreement about where Manafort should be held in custody. Shortly thereafter, NY prosecutors reported that, contrary to Manafort's counsel's assertion, they had not intended to send Manafort to Rikers Island, and they advised DOJ of their preferred location for him to be held, which was accommodated by DOJ.

The Washington Post claimed that, in late 2019, Rosen stalled a probe of former Department of Interior head Ryan Zinke. Federal prosecutors proposed to move forward with possible criminal charges against Zinke over the accuracy of his recollections concerning his involvement in blocking two Native American tribes from operating a casino near an MGM Resorts International gambling facility, and Rosen and others reportedly assessed that more work would be needed before such a case could properly proceed. But in the summer of 2021, the Biden Justice Department determined not to prosecute.

In February 2020, Rosen presented oral argument to the U.S. Supreme Court in a case involving prison inmate litigation (Lomax v. Ortiz-Marquez). Rosen and the government prevailed in a unanimous opinion written by Justice Kagan.

On September 16, 2020, Rosen announced indictments of Chinese hackers, a group known as “Wicked Panda” or “APT-41”, who had targeted more than 100 makers of videogames, universities, and others.

In October 2020, Rosen announced that the Justice Department had filed an antitrust monopolization lawsuit against Google. Rosen had handled antitrust litigation in private practice, including a case against Microsoft, and took a lead role in DOJ's investigation of Google.

Rosen oversaw the Justice Department's resolution of criminal and civil investigations with opioid manufacturer Purdue Pharma. In his statement he said the company would plea guilty to conspiracy to defraud the United States and violate the FDA Act and two other charges, with no individual facing charges

On December 25, 2020, an explosion occurred in Nashville, TN. With Attorney General Barr having departed, Rosen reportedly was briefed on the incident and directed that all DOJ resources be made available to assist in the investigation.

Near the end of December 2020, a Pakistani court ordered the release of Ahmed Omar Saeed Sheikh, the main suspect in the 2002 kidnapping and murder of Daniel Pearl, a Wall Street Journal reporter. Rosen announced that the United States was ready to take custody of Sheikh to stand trial in the U.S., adding that the Pakistan “rulings reversing his conviction and ordering his release are an affront to terrorism victims everywhere”.

=== Acting Attorney General; pressure over 2020 election results ===
On December 14, 2020, it was announced that Rosen would become acting Attorney General on December 24, the day after William Barr's resignation took effect. According to a January 21, 2021, report in The New York Times, even before Barr had left, Rosen was summoned to the Oval Office and pressured by President Donald Trump to aid him in his attempts to reverse the results of the 2020 election. Trump asked him to file Justice Department legal briefs supporting lawsuits against the election results, and to appoint special prosecutors to investigate unfounded allegations of voter fraud and accusations against Dominion Voting Systems. Rosen declined, saying that the department had already investigated and had found no evidence of widespread voter fraud. However, Trump continued to press him and acting Deputy Attorney General Richard Donoghue. In late December, Trump phoned Rosen "nearly every day" to tell him about claims of voter fraud or improper vote counts. Trump also asked Rosen to appoint a special counsel to look into allegations of voter fraud, and another special counsel to investigate Joe Biden's son Hunter. Rosen rejected these requests.

In late December Jeffrey Clark, the acting head of the Justice Department's Civil Division, told Rosen and other top Justice Department officials that the department should announce it was investigating serious election fraud issues. He asked them to sign a letter to Georgia officials claiming the DOJ had "identified significant concerns that may have impacted the outcome of the election in multiple States" and urging the Georgia legislature to convene a special session for the "purpose of considering issues pertaining to the appointment of Presidential Electors." Rosen and Donoghue rejected the proposal, as the department had previously determined and announced that there was no significant fraud. Rosen told the president that the DOJ could not "flip a switch and change the election," to which Trump replied, “I don't expect you to do that. Just say the election was corrupt and leave the rest to me and the Republican congressmen.” The president urged Rosen to “just have a press conference.” Rosen refused. “We don't see that. We're not going to have a press conference.”

Another effort to pressure Rosen to investigate the results of the 2020 presidential election was led by William J. Olson, a Virginia and D.C. lawyer, who represents Mike Lindell, CEO of MyPillow. In a December 28, 2020 memo to Trump, titled “Preserving Constitutional Order,” Olson advised Trump to fire or demote Rosen if Rosen refused to interfere with election results.

In early January, Clark reportedly met with Trump and suggested that he replace Rosen with Clark himself, who would then promote Trump's allegations of election fraud. Trump decided against removing Rosen only after learning from Donoghue and Steven Engel that they and all the other Justice Department senior officials would resign if he did.

In testimony before Congress in May 2021, Rosen reported that "During my tenure, no special prosecutors were appointed, whether for election fraud or otherwise; no public statements were made questioning the election; no letters were sent to State officials seeking to overturn the election results; [and] no DOJ court actions or filings were submitted seeking to overturn election results." In early August 2021, Rosen told the Justice Department inspector general and members of the Senate Judiciary Committee that Clark had tried to get the DOJ to help Trump subvert the election.

On January 6, 2021, in response to the attack on the United States Capitol, Rosen denounced the “intolerable attack on a fundamental institution of our democracy” and he urgently sent hundreds of DOJ law enforcement agents to the Capitol to help restore order, enabling Congress to complete its electoral vote certification that evening. Rosen also announced that DOJ would pursue investigations and criminal charges against the rioters, and approximately 150 were charged by the time he left DOJ two weeks later.

On January 20, 2021, Reuters reported that Rosen was stepping down and leaving the DOJ.

In August 2021, the Chairman of the Senate Judiciary Committee, Dick Durbin, said, "It's a good thing for America we had someone like Rosen in that position." He later said, "History is going to be very kind to Mr. Rosen when it's all over. . . [W]hen he was initially appointed, I didn't think that was the case. I was wrong."

=== Post-White House career ===
On June 23, 2022, Rosen testified in the fifth public hearing of the United States House Select Committee on the January 6 Attack.

On July 17, 2023, Rosen joined Cravath, Swaine & Moore LLP as of counsel, the firm announced in a blog post.

== See also ==
- List of Jewish American jurists

Political offices
Preceded by Victor Mendez	United States Deputy Secretary of Transportation; 2017–2019	Succeeded by Steven G. Bradbury; Acting
Legal offices
Preceded by Rod Rosenstein	United States Deputy Attorney General; 2019–2020	Succeeded by Lisa Monaco
Preceded by William Barr	United States Attorney General; Acting; 2020–2021	Succeeded by John Demers; Acting
