= Kay Firth-Butterfield =

Law and AI ethics professor & author

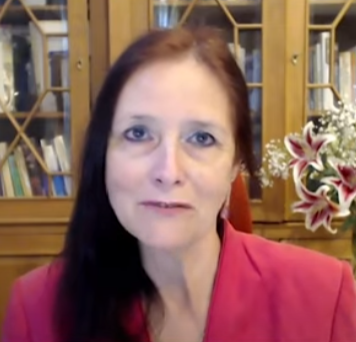
- At the 2021 World Economic Forum
- Known for: Artificial intelligence Machine learning International relations

Academic background
- Education: University of Sussex (BA); St. Mary's University (MA, LLM)

Academic work
- Institutions: World Economic Forum; University of Texas at Austin

Kay Firth-Butterfield is a lawyer, professor, and author specializing in the intersection of artificial intelligence, international relations, business and AI ethics. As of 2020 she was the CEO of the Centre for Trustworthy Technology, a member of the World Economic Forum's Fourth Industrial Revolution Network. Before starting that position Firth-Butterfield was the head of AI and machine learning at the World Economic Forum. She was an adjunct professor of law at the University of Texas at Austin. In 2024, she was appointed a non-resident fellow with the Future of Work and Innovation Economy initiative at the New America Foundation think-tank.

Firth-Butterfield has authored two books: Human Rights and Human Trafficking and Laws on Human Trafficking, the latter co-authored with Tina Miranda. She has also written articles and given speeches on the topics of AI, law, international relations, AI ethics and AI for business and government transformation.

== Education ==
Firth-Butterfield graduated with a Bachelor of Laws (LL.B.) in the School of Social Science, Law and International Politics at the University of Sussex. She also attended St. Mary's University for her further studies, where she received a Master's of International Relations, Conflict and Security and a Master of Laws. She has also completed Law Society Exams of the Law Society of England and Wales, and a Barrister of Law certification at the Inns of Court School of Law.

== Career ==
Firth-Butterfield started her career as a barrister and part-time judge in the United Kingdom. Over time, she began to research more topics about the future of law, including the impact of AI, and specialized more at the intersection of AI and policy. More recently, she has served as an adjunct professor of law at the University of Texas at Austin, where she co-founded the Responsible AI Institute. Firth-Butterfield is currently an Associate Fellow at the Leverhulme Center for the Future of Intelligence at the University of Cambridge.

She has advised governments, think tanks, and nonprofits about artificial intelligence law, ethics, and policy. She established an AI ethics advisory panel at Lucid.ai in 2014, which has since included AI experts like Murray Shanahan, Max Tegmark, and Derek Jinks. Since 2015, she has served as the Executive Committee Vice Chair of IEEE's Global Initiative on Ethical Considerations in the Design of AI and Autonomous Systems. She has also served on Lord Chief Justice’s advisory panel on AI and law, the advisory board for UNESCO's International Research Centre on AI, and AI4ALL's advisory board.

In 2023, Kay Firth-Butterfield became the CEO of Good Tech Advisory, an organisation driving business transformation through the benefits of AI and frontier technologies.

== Selected awards and honors ==
- 2017 – Most Important 25 Women in Robotics
- 2018 – 12 Brilliant Women in AI Ethics
- 2020 – VentureBeat Women in AI Awards Responsibility & Ethics of AI Nominee
- 2020 – 100 Brilliant Women in AI Ethics Hall of Fame Honoree
- 2020 – Forbes Women Defining The 21st Century AI Movement
- 2021 – The New York Times 10 Women Changing the Landscape of Leadership
- 2024 - Time 100 AI Impact Award
- 2024 - Marquis Who's Who Maker's List of Emerging Innovators to Watch
