= Weightmans =

UK law firm

- Headquarters: 100 Old Hall Street, Liverpool, United Kingdom
- No. of offices: 9
- Key people: Sarah Walton (Managing Partner); Peter Wake (Senior Partner)
- Revenue: £125.9 million (2022/23)
- Date founded: 1827 (Liverpool)
- Founder: William Arthur Weightman
- Company type: Limited liability partnership
- Website: weightmans.com

Weightmans (officially Weightmans LLP) is a top 40 UK law firm with nine offices, employing more than 1,400 people, including more than 225 partners.

The firm offers a range of legal services to public organisations, private companies and individuals. In the financial year ending April 2023, its turnover was £125.9 million.

== See also ==
- List of largest United Kingdom-based law firms
