= 2017–2018 Department of Justice metadata seizures =

Seizure of two American congressmen's personal data

The United States Department of Justice under the Trump administration acquired by a February 2018 subpoena the Apple iCloud metadata of two Democrats on the House Intelligence Committee, several others associated with the committee, and some of their family members. The subpoena covered 73 phone numbers and 36 email addresses since the inception of the accounts. Seizing communications information of members of Congress is extraordinarily rare. The department also subpoenaed and obtained 2017 and 2018 phone log and email metadata from news reporters for CNN, The Washington Post and The New York Times. Apple also received and complied with February 2018 subpoenas for the iCloud accounts of White House counsel Don McGahn and his wife. Microsoft received a subpoena relating to a personal email account of a congressional staff member in 2017.

The seizures were made under unusual gag orders and were part of the department's attempt to identify who had leaked information to the press about contacts between Trump associates and Russian officials, as well as foreign policy matters. The subpoenas began under Attorney General Jeff Sessions, who in March 2017 had recused himself from all investigations relating to Russia, and continued under Attorney General Bill Barr. Both men, and their deputy Rod Rosenstein, later said they had no knowledge of the subpoena for members of Congress. The subpoenas first came to the attention of the public via press reports in May 2021, as gag orders expired and the targets of the subpoenas were finally notified that their data had been given to the Justice Department. The Justice Department inspector general and House Judiciary Committee soon opened investigations.

== Background ==
Slate reported in 2013 that the government's interpretation of "metadata" could be broad, and might include message content such as the subject lines of emails.

The Justice Department's use of the Espionage Act of 1917 to seek reporter records dramatically increased over the last 2 decades, with the Bush and Obama administrations also relying on the law to pursue leakers. The Obama Justice Department under Eric Holder was sharply criticized for its use of subpoenas to acquire metadata of journalists in an unprecedented crackdown on leaks of classified information to the press. Beginning in 2014, Holder instituted new rules to curtail but not eliminate such practices.

Leading up to and following the 2016 United States presidential election, there were widespread press reports that Russia attempted to influence the election so as to favor Donald Trump and oppose Hillary Clinton. Even before his inauguration, President-elect Trump demanded investigations to find out who was leaking information about the Russian activity. After Trump took office as president in 2017, the Justice Department under Attorney General of the United States Jeff Sessions undertook a vigorous investigation into who had leaked information to the press about the Russian interference, and particularly about any contact between Trump associates and Russia.

In June 2017 the Justice Department announced charges against Reality Winner, a federal contractor. Prosecutors charged that she had sent a top-secret NSA document pertaining to a 2016 Russian military intelligence cyberattack to The Intercept. In 2018, she was convicted of "removing classified material from a government facility and mailing it to a news outlet" and given the longest sentence ever imposed for unauthorized release of government information to the media. Sessions continued to push for the FBI to prioritize leak investigations. Sessions vowed that he would confront leaks of classified information - a subject which had greatly angered Trump. Trump had repeatedly called for increased prosecution of leaks.

In August 2017, the push for leak investigations escalated dramatically when The Washington Post reported the full leaked transcripts of two previously reported phone conversations President Trump had with Mexican President Enrique Peña Nieto and Australian Prime Minister Turnbull in January 2017. Trump was reportedly enraged for weeks by the phone leaks as undermining his ability to conduct candid foreign policy and internally demanded that fewer people attend his calls. Sessions stated that he would review policies affecting media subpoenas. In November 2017, Sessions told Congress that there were 27 open investigations into what he called an "epidemic" of leaks of classified information, about nine times what the Obama administration had undertaken. In June 2018, the White House stopped the practice of publishing public readouts of Trump's calls with world leaders partly in response to the leaks.

== Metadata seizure ==
=== CNN ===
CNN reported in May 2021 that the Trump Justice Department had secretly acquired by court order the phone logs and email metadata of its Pentagon reporter Barbara Starr for the months of June and July 2017, spanning more than 30,000 email records. The Biden Justice Department disclosed in August 2021 that Barr approved the seizure of Starr's communications in May 2020. Prosecutors were seeking email records from a time period when Starr reported on US military options in North Korea that were ready to be presented to Trump, as well as stories on Syria and Afghanistan. G. Zachary Terwilliger, U.S Attorney for the Eastern District of Virginia oversaw the orders and investigation into CNN with the involvement of prosecutors from the DOJ National Security Division. As of July 1, probes are being conducted into whether management knew about these investigations. Head of the DOJ National Security Division, Assistant Attorney General John Demers has denied knowledge of these actions.

CNN General Counsel David Vigilante was prohibited under a gag order issued by a federal magistrate judge in the Eastern District of Virginia from sharing any details about the government's efforts with anyone beyond the network's president, top attorneys at CNN's corporate parent and attorneys at an outside law firm. Specifically, Vigilante was forbidden from knowing the contents of the investigation, its subjects, the subject matter of the reporting at issue, the time the investigation opened, and from informing the reporter targeted. The DOJ gave little notice to CNN and made Vigilante subject to several restrictions with the risk of contempt and obstruction of justice for refusing to comply. Vigilante retained Jamie Gorelick, Aaron Zebley, and Paul Wolfson from the law firm Wilmer Cutler Pickering Hale and Dorr. CNN President Jeff Zucker was then debriefed on the orders.

CNN filed a motion on September 11, 2020, requesting the judge limit the order. On October 7, 2020, federal Magistrate Theresa Buchanan in Virginia granted the motion and ordered the Justice Department to narrow its search of records related to the relevant account. On October 9, 2020, the DOJ filed a motion to reconsider the court's order, providing a classified affidavit, and Buchanan reversed herself, ordering CNN to comply. On December 16, 2020, CNN had its appeal issued a month earlier heard in district court. In a statement, US District Judge Anthony Trenga said:

"[T]he court has reviewed the government's explanation for why [internal email headers are relevant and concluded the theory of relevancy is based on] speculative predictions, assumptions, and scenarios unanchored in any facts. ... the requested information by its nature is too attenuated and not sufficiently connected to any evidence relevant, material, or useful to the governments ascribed investigation, particularly when considered in light of the First Amendment activities that it relates to."

The district court narrowed the order, and CNN pressed for notifications before additional subpoenas for Starr's data. On January 15, 2021, Justice Department again filed a motion to reconsider. On January 26, 2021, in the beginning of the Biden administration, the DOJ and CNN reached a mutual resolution and concluded the litigation, requiring Starr to be notified of the seizure of her communications on May 13, 2021.

=== New York Times ===
The New York Times reported in April 2017 that during the investigation into the Hillary Clinton email controversy, the FBI was provided documents acquired by Dutch intelligence hackers which had previously been stolen by Russian intelligence, and which the Justice Department had classified. In June 2021 it became known that the Justice Department had attempted by court order to obtain the phone logs and email logs, sans contents, of Matt Apuzzo, Adam Goldman, Eric Lichtblau and Michael Schmidt, four Times reporters who had written the article together. DOJ obtained the phone logs in 2020, according to a spokesman for the Biden Justice Department. The Biden Justice Department disclosed in August 2021 that Barr approved the seizures in September 2020.

On January 5, 2021, acting head of the DC U.S. attorney's office Channing Phillips obtained a court order from a magistrate judge under seal requiring Google, which operates The Times's email system, to secretly turn over email logs of the four reporters. Contractually obligated to inform NYT of the effort, Google resisted the order. No email records were ultimately obtained in the effort. Through negotiations, NYT was able to be informed to a limited extent of the investigation through its lawyers and intended to ask the court to challenge the order. The Biden administration, while continuing to pursue the email records, notified a few NYT executives of its quest, but subjected them to a gag order on March 3 which prevented them from disclosing the government's efforts even to its executive editor, Dean Baquet. An NYT lawyer commented that it was "unprecedented" for the DOJ to impose a gag order as part of a leak investigation, and until then had never seized NYT's phone records without advance notice.

On June 2, 2021, the DOJ informed NYT it would quash the order to Google and disclose its prior seizure of phone records. During the transition into the Biden administration, one official wrote a memo that the controversial order should be terminated and the case closed. However, the leak investigations and gag orders were maintained under the Biden DOJ until the gag orders expired and investigations disclosed to the press.

=== Washington Post ===
On May 3, 2021, three Washington Post reporters, Ellen Nakashima and Greg Miller, and former reporter Adam Entous, who covered the FBI's Crossfire Hurricane investigation were informed that the Justice Department in 2020 had attained phone records from April 15 to July 31, 2017, including their work, home, or cellphone numbers. The correspondence listed various phones for which records had been seized: Nakashima's work, cellphone, and home phone; Miller's work phone and cellphone; and Entous's cellphone number. The phone records taken included the numbers of calls made to and from the targeted phone over the specified time period and the call duration, but do not include the calls' contents. Prosecutors also obtained a court order to acquire "non-content communication records" for the reporters' work email accounts but did not act on it. The Washington Post received two letters from the Department of Justice, outlining the five phones affected by the department's seizure. These letters bore the signatures Channing Phillips and John Demers respectively. The Biden Justice Department disclosed in August 2021 that Barr approved the seizure of the communications on November 13, 2020.

=== Other news media ===
The Justice Department disclosed in 2018 that in 2017 it had acquired the phone and email communications of a reporter for Politico, BuzzFeed and the Times who had written articles about Russia.

=== Lawmakers ===
The Justice Department subpoenaed Microsoft in 2017 for a congressional staffer's personal email account, and secured a gag order. Microsoft notified the account holder of the subpoena after the gag order expired, after which they contacted Microsoft informing them of their status as a congressional staffer. The DOJ further issued a subpoena to Apple for Michael Bahar, a staff member for Schiff on the House Intelligence Committee, and sought to identify accountholders connected to the staffer The DOJ did not inform Schiff of the investigation involving his aide before the FBI interviewed his aide. When Schiff was made aware of the interview, he with his House counsel, confronted the DOJ, which offered few details.

On February 6, 2018, the Trump Justice Department under Jeff Sessions subpoenaed metadata from the Apple iCloud accounts, including "customer or subscriber account information," of at least a dozen individuals associated with the House Intelligence Committee, including Democratic ranking member Adam Schiff, member Eric Swalwell, aides, and family members, to investigate leaks to the press about contacts between Trump associates and Russia. Apart from corruption investigations, subpoenaing communications information of members of Congress is nearly unheard-of. The subpoena appeared to have resulted from a leak investigation initially including the targeting of a senior aide on the House Intelligence Committee, and not the lawmakers themselves. The DOJ did not inform the HPSCI about the 2018 subpoena.

By the time of the subpoena, the House Intelligence Committee had been investigating Russian interference in the 2016 election, in which some Trump associates were named. The day before the subpoena, Trump tweeted that Schiff was "one of the biggest liars and leakers in Washington."

Apple said it received the subpoena for Intelligence Committee metadata in February 2018, and that it demanded information for 73 phone numbers and 36 email addresses; a source told CNN the subpoena covered data from the inception of the accounts. Apple provided limited information such as metadata and account subscriber information and did not provide any content such as pictures or emails. While Apple says it would have normally informed customers, the department also secured a gag order to prevent Apple from telling the customers their data had been given out. The customers did not know they were being investigated until Apple informed them on May 5, 2021, after the gag order, having been renewed yearly, had expired. CNN reported records seized included those from staff members who had nothing to do with issues related to Russia or former FBI Director James Comey, including Schiff's personal office staff. iCloud commonly and automatically stores a wide variety of information users generate on their Apple devices, including phone call history, voicemails, emails, text messages and instant messages, as well as photos and documents.

Metadata from the inquiry did not implicate anyone associated with the committee, and the inquiry languished. However, when Bill Barr became attorney general in February 2019, he revived the effort, and in February 2020 he called up Craig Carpenito, the United States Attorney for the District of New Jersey, to recommend a strong prosecutor to invigorate the investigations. Carpenito's office lent Osmar Benvenuto, a Democrat, to lead the investigations, and about six others to work on the leak investigation involving Schiff. The New York Times reported some in the Justice Department and those in the New Jersey office saw Barr's approach as politically motivated. Barr was kept regularly informed on the investigations, and he frequently received memos on the progress of the probes.

=== Don McGahn ===
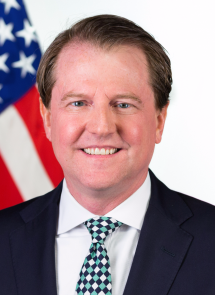
White House Counsel Don McGahn (pictured) and his wife had their Apple iCloud account data seized by the DOJ in February 2018.

On February 23, 2018, Apple also received and complied with grand jury subpoenas issued in the Eastern District of Virginia relating to the iCloud accounts of White House counsel Don McGahn and his wife. When the Justice Department subpoenaed Apple it was unaware McGahn's records were among those it sought. Sessions and Rosenstein were reportedly unaware of the subpoenas, and neither was Mueller's legal team, which had instead received McGahn's phone records voluntarily. Former Trump DOJ officials insisted Rosenstein would have never supported such a subpoena, and instead McGahn's data was acquired in an unrelated investigation and his name had never been verified as included. The grand jury subpoenas were also under a gag order, as the DOJ multiple times went to a judge to keep it secret.

The New York Times reported there were two events roughly concurrent with the subpoenas. The Mueller investigation of former Trump campaign chairman Paul Manafort was scrutinizing his communications, which might have included McGahn, who was the top Trump campaign lawyer, though CNN reported the subpoenas did not originate from the Mueller investigation. The Times reported in January 2018 that in June 2017 Trump instructed McGahn to have the Justice Department remove Mueller, which McGahn told Trump he would not do, and Trump pressured McGahn to keep the instruction secret as it might have constituted obstruction of justice.

== Aftermath ==
After the transition to the Biden administration, the Justice Department continued to pursue news organization investigations and gag orders for several months, following "established procedures". In early June they said that, "consistent with the president's direction", they had discontinued the practice of issuing subpoenas to journalists. The investigation that acquired Schiff and Swalwell's data records has since been closed.

Senior executives from CNN, The New York Times and The Washington Post planned to meet with US Attorney General Merrick Garland on June 14 to discuss the controversial leak investigation into journalists' records from all three media outlets and the gag orders to cover them up. The executives also plan to ask for safeguards to ensure the freedom of the press, and commit to regulatory changes to prevent future abuses from the Justice Department. The meeting occurred as scheduled, with multiple news media executives in attendance: CNN Washington bureau chief Sam Feist and general counsel David Vigilante on behalf of CNN, publisher A.G. Sulzberger and deputy general counsel David McCraw from The Times, publisher Fred Ryan, executive editor Sally Buzbee and head of legal Jay Kennedy from The Post, and Bruce Brown of RCFP. The meeting was conducted with Garland and 7 other DOJ officials. Speaking on behalf of the news representatives, Brown reiterated the importance of protecting confidential soures. Garland also met with Schiff.

Associate Attorney General John Demers, who had been head of the DOJ's National Security Division, was the final 2021 holdover from the Trump administration, having taken office in February 2018. Biden DOJ officials asked him to stay on for a while, and he agreed to stay until the end of June 2021. Just before his scheduled June departure the news broke about the subpoenas to news organizations and congressmembers. The congressional subpoenas had been issued in February 2018, reportedly prior to Demers taking office that same month. Demer's replacement, Matt Olsen, has already been nominated by President Biden, and is awaiting Senate approval as of June 2021.

Microsoft's vice president of customer security, Tom Burt, plans to testify before the House Judiciary Committee and criticize the government for its abuse of gag orders in his testimony. Expected remarks include "We are not suggesting that secrecy orders should only be obtained through some impossible standard," and "We simply ask that it be a meaningful one. ... Without legislative reform, abuses will continue to occur -- and they will continue to occur out of sight." Burt will also provide data on the DOJ requests that Microsoft routinely receives.

=== Investigations ===
The day after news broke about the subpoenas involving reporters and congressmembers, Deputy Attorney General Lisa Monaco referred the matter to the DOJ Office of the Inspector General led by Michael E. Horowitz, which announced it would investigate the matter. A statement from the inspector general's office said, "The review will examine the Department's compliance with applicable DOJ policies and procedures, and whether any such uses, or the investigations, were based upon improper considerations. If circumstances warrant, the OIG will consider other issues that may arise during the review."

Democratic congressional leaders also vowed to investigate the department's efforts to seize the communications records of congressmembers and their staff and family members. House Judiciary Chairman Jerry Nadler on June 14 announced his committee would formally open an investigation into the DOJ's surveillance of congressmen, journalists and others.

=== Legality ===
The Justice Department was legally allowed to secretly obtain journalists' records through a court order. The Obama Justice Department laid out revised, slightly more stringent guidelines for issuing media subpoenas in 2015, mandating that the attorney general had to authorize subpoenas when they related to the newsgathering activities of journalists. Existing policy required the department to notify reporters of the investigation as soon as the records were sought, or within no more than 90 days if investigators believe disclosure could compromise an investigation or harm national security. However, the Trump DOJ sought and obtained gag orders lasting years, forbidding the news agencies they had subpoenaed from divulging the information.

It is extraordinarily rare — almost "unheard-of" — for the Justice Department to subpoena records relating to members of Congress, except in cases of corruption. Sessions and Barr, and their deputy Rosenstein, have claimed they knew nothing about any subpoenas involving legislators.

It is extraordinary to subpoena a White House counsel's records. CNN noted that it was strange for the White House counsel for the president to be subject of a subpoena from within the president's own Justice Department.

== Reactions ==
=== Organizations ===
CNN Pentagon Correspondent Barbara Starr in an op-ed called the Trump DOJ's seizure of her communications data "a sheer abuse of power" against the free press that should be protected by the First Amendment, and called for the codification of new protections for reporters.

Dean Baquet, the executive editor of The New York Times, said in a statement that "[s]eizing the phone records of journalists profoundly undermines press freedom," and that "[i]t threatens to silence the sources we depend on to provide the public with essential information about what the government is doing." Commenting on Google's actions, Baquet elaborated that "[c]learly, Google did the right thing, but it should never have come to this." Banquet stated that "[t]he Justice Department relentlessly pursued the identity of sources for coverage that was clearly in the public interest in the final 15 days of the Trump administration. And the Biden administration continued to pursue it. As I said before, it profoundly undermines press freedom." New York Times published A. G. Sulzberger stated his appreciation to the Biden DOJ's new commitment, but maintained that "there is significantly more that needs to be done and we are still awaiting an explanation on why the Department of Justice moved so aggressively to seize journalists' records."

Cameron Barr, The Washington Post's acting executive editor, stated : "We are deeply troubled by this use of government power to seek access to the communications of journalists. The Department of Justice should immediately make clear its reasons for this intrusion into the activities of reporters doing their jobs, an activity protected under the First Amendment." Sally Buzbee, executive editor, called for a "full accounting of the chain of events in both administrations and to implement enduring protections to prevent any future recurrence." She added that "[s]ecret efforts to obtain journalists' phone and email records severely hinder the ability of news organizations to uncover information of clear public interest, damaging the First Amendment."

Bruce Brown, executive director of the Reporters Committee for Freedom of the Press, said the data seizure "raises serious First Amendment concerns because it interferes with the free flow of information to the public," and he called on the Justice Department to explain "exactly when prosecutors seized these records, why it is only now notifying The Post, and on what basis the Justice Department decided to forgo the presumption of advance notification under its own guidelines when the investigation apparently involves reporting over three years in the past."

Jake Laperruque, senior counsel for The Constitution Project at the Project on Government Oversight, called for new legislation binding for future administrations to curb the controversial data gathering practice.

A Google spokeswoman said that while it does not comment on specific cases, the company was "firmly committed to protecting our customers' data and we have a long history of pushing to notify our customers about any legal requests."

In a June 13 Washington Post op-ed, Microsoft President Brad Smith opined that different administrations have used gag orders with wide discretion, and that Congress should mandate heightened standards governing the use of gag orders. "Congress should prohibit the executive branch from conducting its investigations wholly in secret absent a strong showing of necessity supported by compelling evidence," Smith wrote. "And even when the government does meet that burden, any secrecy order should be narrowly tailored in time and scope. Third parties responding to such orders should have a mechanism to challenge them. And indefinite gag orders should be unlawful."

Apple suggested the same subpoenas for data may have gone to other phone companies and tech corporations, though no other company aside from Microsoft has publicly acknowledged being served with such subpoenas.

=== Trump administration ===
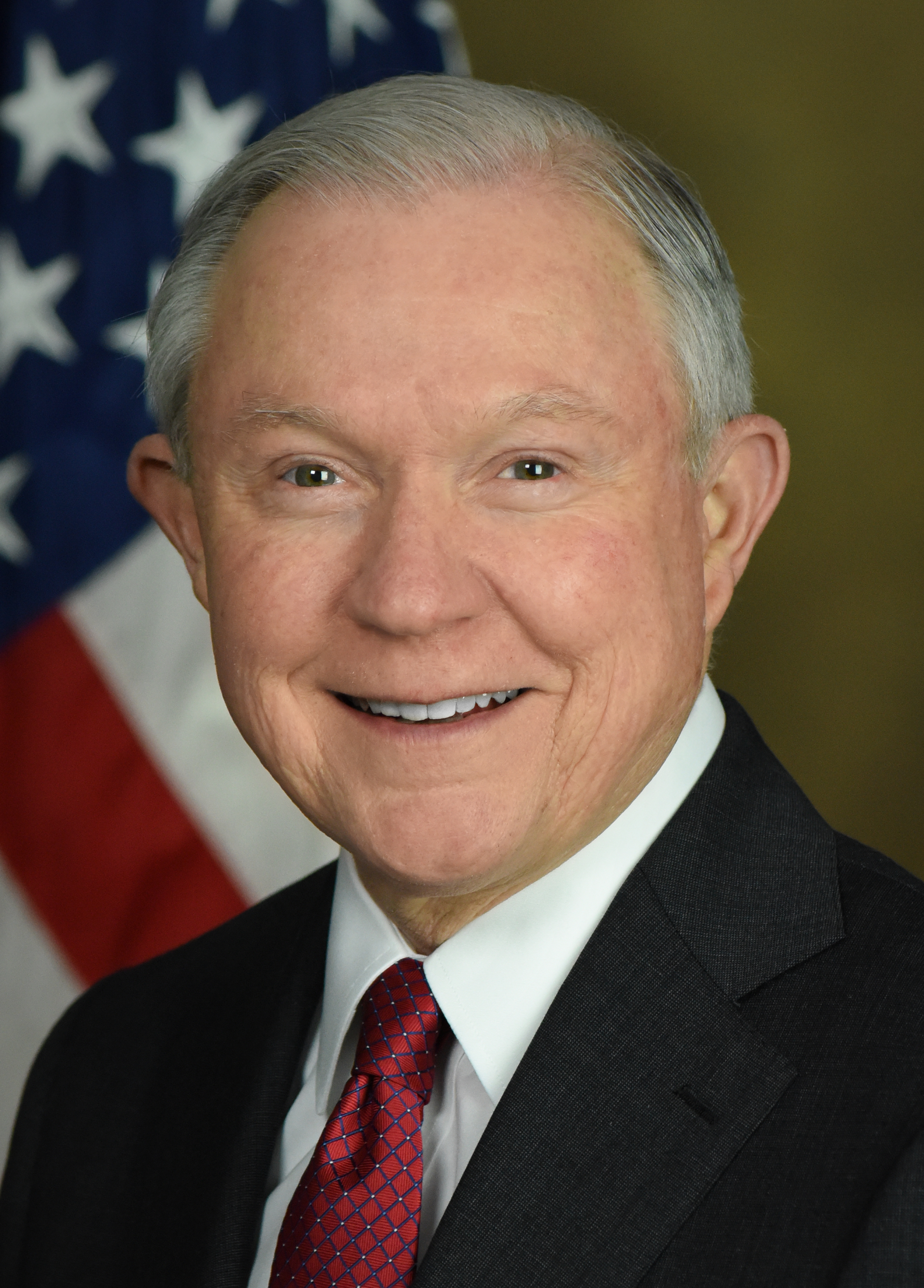
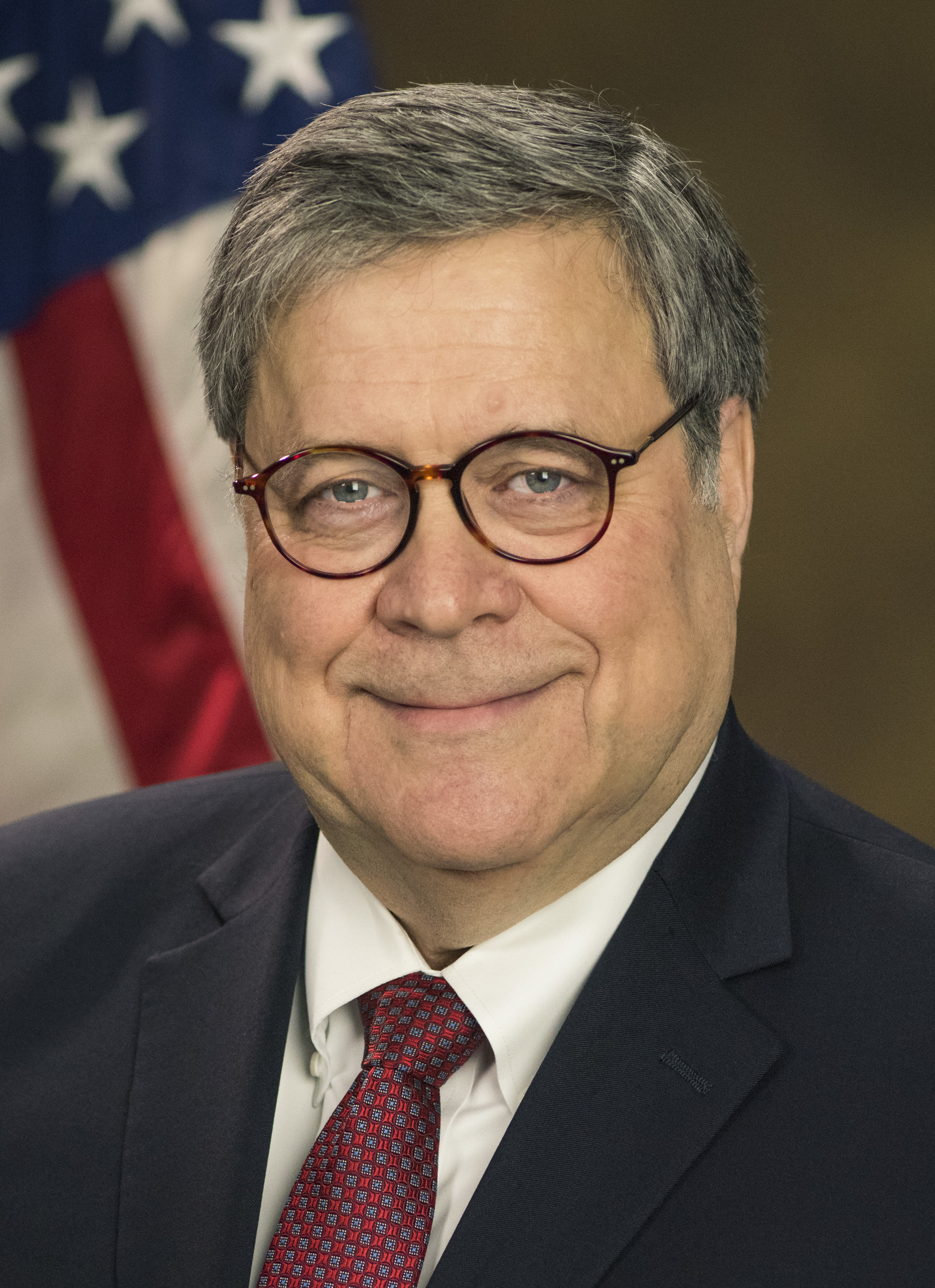
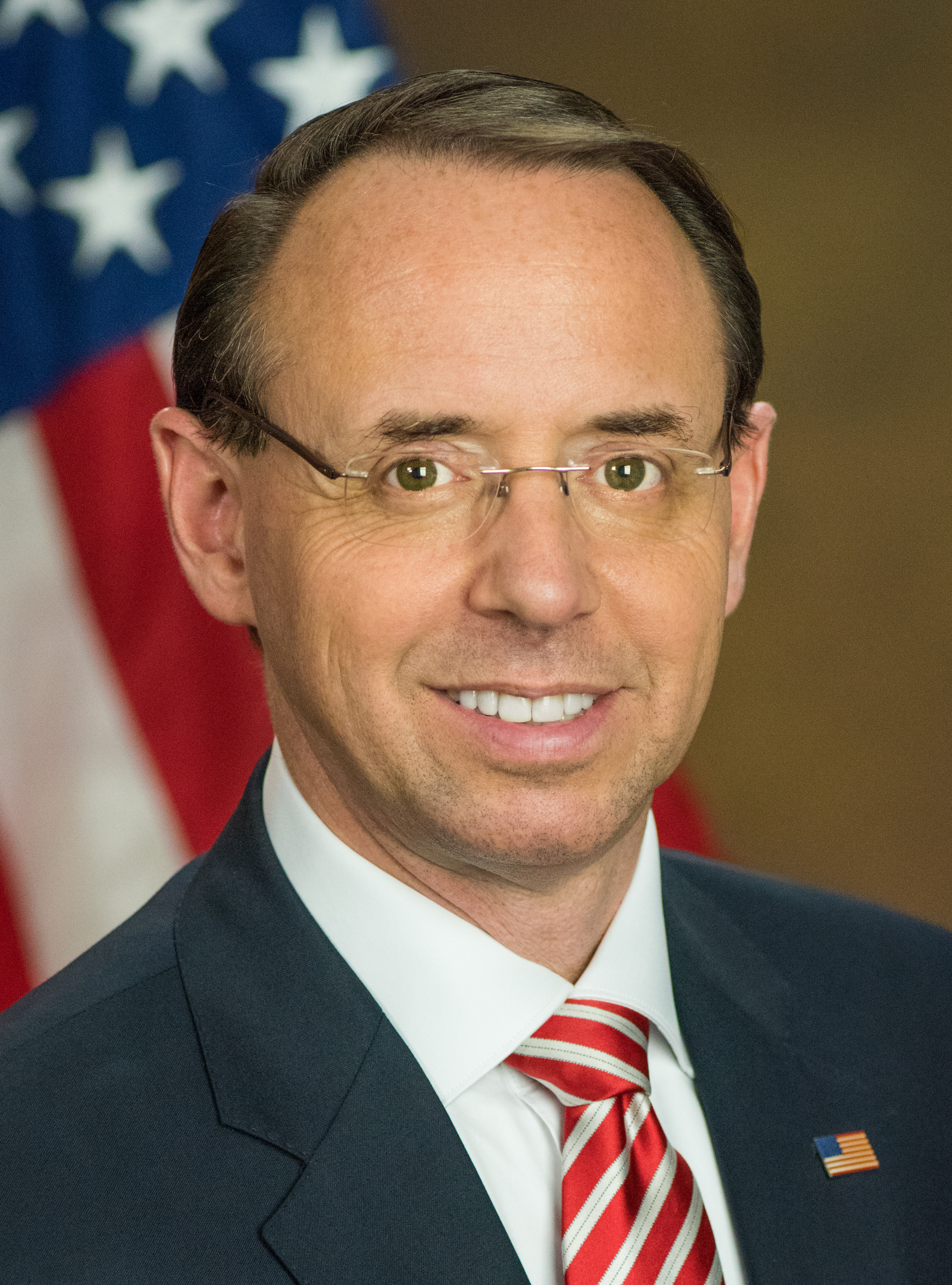
Attorneys General Jeff Sessions (left), William Barr (center), and Deputy Attorney General Rod Rosenstein (right) all denied being aware of subpoenas seizing data of Democratic lawmakers.

The Daily Beast reported Sessions denied involvement in the subpoenaing of the committee members. He had recused himself from involvement in investigations relating to Russia in March 2017. Adam Goldman, one of the Times reporters who wrote the article about subpoenas of committee members, noted in an interview that because Sessions was recused, the decision to pursue subpoenas would presumably have fallen to deputy attorney general Rod Rosenstein.

Rosenstein also sought to distance himself form the controversial investigation, and recently told people that he also was not aware of a subpoena that targeted the data of Democratic lawmakers while he was deputy attorney general. Both Sessions and Rosenstein were not aware of the request for information related to McGahn and his wife.

In a phone interview with Politico, Barr distanced himself from the reports of the Trump DOJ issuing subpoenas for lawmakers and news reporters. He claimed he was "not aware of any congressman's records being sought in a leak case." He added that Trump never encouraged him to target the Democratic lawmakers in his push to unmask leakers of classified information. Trump "was not aware of who we were looking at in any of the cases," Barr said. "I never discussed the leak cases with Trump. He didn't really ask me any of the specifics."

In light of none of the senior DOJ officials being aware, CNN noted that the incident would appear to be a breach of protocol and a "potential separation of powers problem" if prosecutors were investigating with little oversight.

=== Biden administration ===
==== White House ====
After news reports about the subpoenas, President Biden said that he would prohibit the Justice Department from seizing phone records or emails from reporters. Biden told CNN on May 21, "We should absolutely, positively -- it's wrong, it's simply, simply wrong," adding, "I will not let that happen."

White House Press Secretary Jen Psaki in a June 5 statement attempted to distance the White House from the DOJ's continued effort to seize data from NYT reporters, saying "As appropriate given the independence of the Justice Department in specific criminal cases, no one at the White House was aware of the gag order until Friday night (June 4)." She reiterated the president's stance that the DOJ practice would not continue moving forward.

White House communications director Kate Bedingfield stated on June 11 that "[t]he reports of the behavior of the attorney general under Donald Trump are appalling," and suggested that Biden has a "very different relationship" with the Justice Department than his predecessor. She criticized the Trump administration's "abuse of power" with the department, and adding that the Biden administration's Justice Department is "run very, very differently." Bedingfield maintained that "[Biden] respects the independence of the Justice Department, and it's a critically important part of how he governs."

==== Justice Department ====
On May 7, before Biden's statement on the subject, Justice Department spokesman Marc Raimondi confirmed that the requests had taken place, stating "[w]hile rare, the Department follows the established procedures within its media guidelines policy when seeking legal process to obtain telephone toll records and non-content email records from media members as part of a criminal investigation into unauthorized disclosure of classified information," and that "[t]he targets of these investigations are not the news media recipients but rather those with access to the national defense information who provided it to the media and thus failed to protect it as lawfully required."

Anthony Coley, a Justice Department spokesman, stated on June 5 that "Going forward, consistent with the President's direction, this Department of Justice — in a change to its longstanding practice — will not seek compulsory legal process in leak investigations to obtain source information from members of the news media doing their jobs." He added that "on multiple occasions in recent months," the Biden-era department had moved to delay enforcement of the gag order and finally "voluntarily moved to withdraw the order before any records were produced." He added, "The department strongly values a free and independent press, and is committed to upholding the First Amendment."

In a statement issued on June 14, Attorney General Merrick Garland affirmed that the Justice Department would "strengthen" rules regarding seeking congressional records. He expressed confidence in the inspector general's review, and stated that he instructed Deputy Attorney General Lisa Monaco to evaluate and strengthen existing policies and procedures for acquiring congressional records, and noted his commitment to the rule of law and separation of powers. Garland said at a Senate Appropriations Committee hearing on June 9 that he would issue a memo to solidify the media policy changes.

On July 19, Garland in a memo to the Justice Department instituted new rules regarding the seizure of news reporters' data or testimony. This includes no longer using compulsory legal processes when seizing data from news reporters. It also bans forcing reporters to disclosing their sources or notes. News organisations commended the action and called for such regulations to be codified.

=== Congress ===
==== House ====
On June 10, House Speaker Nancy Pelosi called the development "harrowing" and "another egregious assault on our democracy waged by the former president." She supported Schiff's call for an investigation into the data seizure and other acts of the "weaponization of law enforcement" by Trump. On June 13, Pelosi reiterated her prior comments and stated she believed that Sessions, Barr, and Rosenstein should testify, expressing disbelief that none of the men were unaware of the activity occurring under their authority.

Rep. Adam Schiff said he was shocked but not surprised at the reports. He said in a statement, "The politicization of the Department and the attacks on the rule of law are among the most dangerous assaults on our democracy carried out by the former President," adding that the Inspector General should investigate the case. He continued his criticism in a Washington Post op-ed.

Rep. Eric Swalwell maintained that he never leaked classified information and derided the Trump DOJ for seizing lawmakers' data. "This is about everyday Americans who don't want to see their government weaponize law enforcement against them because of their political beliefs," Swalwell said, calling Trump the "biggest brother we've ever seen," referring to Big Brother in George Orwell's Nineteen Eighty-Four. Swalwell confirmed to CNN that records of family members and a minor had been obtained. Both Schiff and Swalwell stated that they were unaware of the circumstances of their acquired records, whether they were subjects of the data seizures or whether the investigations were appropriately predicated.

Rep. Jerry Nadler, the chairman of the House Judiciary Committee, stated that "[the committee] expect[s] the Department to provide a full accounting of these cases, and [they] expect the Attorney General to hold the relevant personnel accountable for their conduct," He announced on June 14 that the committee was opening an investigation. In a June 14 statement announcing a formal investigation, he stated "It remains possible that these cases ... are isolated incidents. Even if these reports are completely unrelated, they raise serious constitutional and separation of power concerns," and that "Congress must make it extraordinarily difficult, if not impossible, for the Department to spy on the Congress or the news media. We should make it hard for prosecutors to hide behind secret gag orders for years at a time. We cannot rely on the Department alone to make these changes."

Rep. Alexandria Ocasio-Cortez stated, "I think the actions of Biden's DOJ has been extremely concerning and it's not just on the actions on gag orders, which is also extremely concerning, but across the board," referring to gag orders the Trump DOJ imposed until they expired in May.

Rep. Matt Gaetz, a Republican Judiciary Committee member, also unusually came to Schiff's defense, stating that the "DOJ has a very nasty tendency to target its critics, Republican and Democrat." In a statement, Gaetz said "[t]he Schiff story reminded me of the DOJ's threats to use criminal process against House staff exposing their misdeeds .. I stand against all of it, no matter how much I personally dislike Schiff."

Rep. Chris Stewart, a Republican Intelligence Committee member, said in a statement that "[he's] been concerned, and voiced [his] concerns, about the leaking of classified information for many years. Leaks hurt our national security, break faith between government officials and the American people, and very often are deceptive, if not completely inaccurate," and that "[he] support[s] investigating leaks of classified information." He added that "when the DOJ is acting within their legal bounds, members of the Intelligence Committee shouldn't be immune to appropriate investigations."

==== Senate ====
Senate Majority Leader Chuck Schumer and Senate Judiciary Committee Chair Dick Durbin (D-Ill.) called for Barr, Sessions, Demers, and former acting Attorney General Matthew Whitaker to appear before the Judiciary Committee for relevant questioning. Schumer and Durbin in a joint statement declared that "[t]his appalling politicization of the Department of Justice by Donald Trump and his sycophants must be investigated immediately by both the DOJ Inspector General and Congress," and that the Judiciary Committee "will vigorously investigate this abuse of power." Schumer further called the data seizure "a gross abuse of power," "assault on the separation of powers," and "fingerprints of a dictatorship, not a democracy."

On June 14, Senate Minority Leader Mitch McConnell on the Senate floor stated that "[the] Department of Justice is empowered to investigate criminal conduct by members of Congress and their staff," and that "[n]ecessarily, this sort of investigation is subject to strict procedural protections. And the department's inspector general is fully equipped to determine whether those procedures were followed in this case. I am confident that the existing inquiry will uncover the truth. There is no need for a partisan circus here in Congress." He blasted Democrats for going after a "witch hunt in the making" by focusing on Barr, who McConnell said served with "honor and integrity."

Senate Minority Whip John Thune disagreed with McConnell and suggested that it warranted further review and investigation. He questioned how the DOJ acquired data from members of Congress and suggested the Senate committees could review the matter.

Sen. Chuck Grassley of Iowa, the Judiciary Committee's top Republican, indicated that he opposes a congressional probe. In a statement, Grassley stated that "[i]nvestigations into members of Congress and staff are nothing new, especially for classified leaks," and that "[t]he Justice Department has specific procedures for such sensitive investigations, and the inspector general is already working to determine if they were followed."

Sen. John Cornyn, a Judiciary Committee member, sided with McConnell, stating that "[i]t's a court proceeding and the judge is going to decide if it is appropriate or not," and so "there's not much of a role for us to play."

Sen. Josh Hawley, a Judiciary Committee member, stated his concerns with the appropriateness of the DOJ's subpoenas in "very rare circumstances," but declined to comment further, stating he did not know enough to comment further.

Sen. Thom Tillis, a Judiciary Committee member, said it was "an interesting question" when asked if Barr and Sessions should be subpoenaed, suggesting it was a decision to be made between the chair on the ranking member, and that he would to defer to them bringing before the committee.

Sen. Marsha Blackburn declined to respond on the matter, and Sen. Ben Sasse's office did not respond for comment.
