= Dana Boente =

American attorney (born 1954)

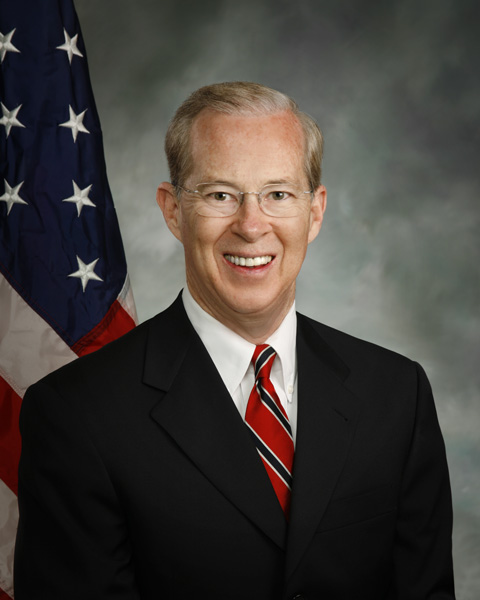

General Counsel of the Federal Bureau of Investigation
- In office January 23, 2018 – June 30, 2020
- Director: Christopher A. Wray
- Preceded by: James Baker
- Succeeded by: Jason A. Jones

United States Assistant Attorney General for the National Security Division
- Acting; April 28, 2017 – February 22, 2018
- President: Donald Trump
- Preceded by: Mary B. McCord (acting)
- Succeeded by: John Demers

United States Attorney for the Eastern District of Virginia
- In office September 23, 2013 – January 28, 2018; Acting: September 23, 2013 – December 15, 2015
- President: Barack Obama; Donald Trump
- Preceded by: Neil MacBride
- Succeeded by: G. Zachary Terwilliger
- In office October 2008 – September 2009
- President: George W. Bush; Barack Obama
- Preceded by: Chuck Rosenberg
- Succeeded by: Neil MacBride

United States Attorney for the Eastern District of Louisiana
- In office December 2012 – September 2013
- President: Barack Obama
- Preceded by: Jim Letten
- Succeeded by: Kenneth Polite

United States Deputy Attorney General
- Acting
- In office February 9, 2017 – April 26, 2017
- President: Donald Trump
- Preceded by: Sally Yates
- Succeeded by: Rod Rosenstein

United States Attorney General
- Acting
- In office January 30, 2017 – February 9, 2017
- President: Donald Trump
- Deputy: Vacant
- Preceded by: Channing D. Phillips (acting)
- Succeeded by: Jeff Sessions

Personal details
- Born: Dana James Boente; February 7, 1954 (age 72) Carlinville, Illinois, U.S.
- Party: Republican
- Education: Saint Louis University (BS, MBA, JD)

Dana James Boente (/ˈbɛnteɪ/ Bent-Ë) (born February 7, 1954) is an American attorney who served as General Counsel of the Federal Bureau of Investigation (FBI) from January 2018 to June 2020, United States Attorney for the Eastern District of Virginia from September 2013 to January 2018 and as acting United States Attorney General from January to February 2017. He also served as acting assistant attorney general for the National Security Division of the United States Department of Justice. On October 27, 2017, Boente announced he would resign from the Department of Justice after a successor is in place. On January 23, 2018, Boente was named General Counsel of the Federal Bureau of Investigation (FBI) by the director, Christopher A. Wray, filling the vacancy after James Baker's reassignment to another part of the bureau.

== Early life and education ==
Boente was born in Carlinville, Illinois in 1954 to James and Doris Boente. Boente received a Bachelor of Science degree in business administration in 1976 from Saint Louis University and his Master of Business Administration from the Richard A. Chaifetz School of Business in 1977. He then attended the Saint Louis University School of Law, receiving his Juris Doctor in 1982.

== Career ==
In 1982, Boente began his career as a law clerk for Chief U.S. District Judge J. Waldo Ackerman for the Central District of Illinois. In 1984, he joined the Tax Division's Criminal Section as part of the Attorney General's Honors Program. Boente became an Assistant U.S. Attorney in the Fraud Unit of the Eastern District of Virginia in 2001.

In December 2012, Boente was appointed by President Barack Obama to serve as the U.S. Attorney for the Eastern District of Virginia, a position he held until September 2013. He became the Acting U.S. Attorney for the Eastern District of Virginia by virtue of the Vacancy Reform Act on September 23, 2013, and served in that position until December 15, 2015. In this role, he was involved in the sentencing of former Virginia governor Bob McDonnell and his wife Maureen. He stated that, "No one is above the law... not a high public official, not even the highest public official [in Virginia]." McDonnell's conviction was unanimously overturned by the United States Supreme Court on June 27, 2016, with Chief Justice John Roberts declaring that McDonnell's actions as governor were "tawdry", but agreed that instructions to the jury in his case about what constitutes "official acts" were so broad, they could cover almost any action a public official takes. The Justice Department, against the wishes of Boente's office, decided not to re-try either McDonnell and dismissed all charges.

He was nominated on October 8, 2015, and confirmed by the United States Senate on December 15, 2015, as the 60th U.S. Attorney for the Eastern District of Virginia and was confirmed by the United States Senate via voice vote on December 15, 2015. Boente was one of the 46 United States Attorneys ordered by Attorney General Jeff Sessions on March 10, 2017 to tender their resignation; Trump declined to accept his.

President Donald Trump appointed Boente as Acting Attorney General on January 30, 2017, after Acting Attorney General Sally Yates was dismissed by Trump earlier that evening. Upon Yates’ dismissal, Channing D. Phillips, the United States Attorney for the District of Columbia, served as Acting Attorney General for a few hours pursuant to Executive Order 13762 titled “Providing an Order of Succession Within the Department of Justice” until President Donald Trump signed an executive order appointing Boente to replace Yates later that evening. When Jeff Sessions was confirmed and sworn in as Attorney General on February 9, 2017, Boente became Acting Deputy Attorney General.

Sessions recused himself from all matters pertaining to American presidential campaigns because of revelations that he had communications with Russian Ambassador to the U.S. Sergey Kislyak during the 2016 United States presidential election, Boente was designated to perform the functions of the Attorney General with respect to campaign issues until the permanent deputy attorney general, Rod J. Rosenstein, was confirmed and sworn into office which took place on April 25, 2017.

On October 27, 2017 Boente announced his intention to resign as U.S. Attorney and as acting assistant attorney general for the National Security Division; he said he would remain in the positions until a replacement is confirmed.

On January 23, 2018, Boente was named general counsel to the FBI by Director Christopher Wray, filling the vacancy after James Baker's reassignment to another part of the bureau.

On May 29, 2020, Boente resigned from the Federal Bureau of Investigation, effective June 30.

== Personal life ==
Boente has lived in Northern Virginia since 1984.

Legal offices
Preceded by James Baker	General Counsel of the Federal Bureau of Investigation; 2018–2020	Succeeded by Jason A. Jones
Preceded by Mary B. McCord; Acting	United States Assistant Attorney General for the National Security Division; Acting; 2017–2018	Succeeded by John Demers
Preceded by Sally Yates	United States Deputy Attorney General; Acting; 2017	Succeeded by Rod Rosenstein
Preceded by Channing D. Phillips; Acting	United States Attorney General; Acting; 2017	Succeeded by Jeff Sessions
Preceded by Neil MacBride	United States Attorney for the Eastern District of Virginia; 2013–2018; Acting: 2013–2015	Succeeded by G. Zachary Terwilliger
Preceded by Jim Letten	United States Attorney for the Eastern District of Louisiana; 2012–2013	Succeeded by Kenneth Polite
Preceded by Chuck Rosenberg	United States Attorney for the Eastern District of Virginia; 2008–2009	Succeeded by Neil MacBride
