= Mary B. McCord =

American attorney and national security analyst

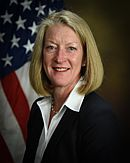

United States Assistant Attorney General for the National Security Division
- Acting
- In office October 15, 2016 – April 28, 2017
- President: Barack Obama; Donald Trump
- Preceded by: John P. Carlin
- Succeeded by: Dana Boente (acting)

Principal Deputy Assistant Attorney General for the National Security Division
- In office October 21, 2014 – October 15, 2016
- President: Barack Obama

Personal details
- Spouse: Sheldon Snook
- Education: Georgetown University (JD)

Mary B. McCord is an American lawyer, national security analyst, and former government official. For almost 20 years, McCord served as a federal prosecutor in the office of the United States Attorney for the District of Columbia. She was also Principal Deputy Assistant Attorney General and Acting United States Assistant Attorney General for the National Security Division at the United States Department of Justice. McCord has written articles on the rule of law and domestic terrorism and has appeared on televised media outlets as a national security analyst.

== Education ==
In 1990, McCord received a Juris Doctor from Georgetown University Law Center.

== Career ==
For almost 20 years, McCord was an Assistant U.S. Attorney for the District of Columbia. In the District of Columbia Court of Appeals, she served as Deputy Chief of the Appellate Division and as Chief of the Criminal Division.

From 2014 to 2016, McCord served as Principal Deputy Assistant Attorney General for the U.S. Department of Justice National Security Division. She then served as Acting Assistant Attorney General for National Security from 2016 to 2017.

In 2017, McCord became a visiting professor of law at Georgetown University Law Center. In that position, she serves as executive director of the Law Center's Institute for Constitutional Advocacy and Protection.

After the January 6, 2021 attack on the U. S. Capitol, McCord became legal counsel to the U.S. House of Representatives Task Force 1-6 Capitol Security Review through an appointment by the Speaker of the House.

In 2023, McCord joined veteran prosecutor Andrew Weissmann as cohost of the MSNBC audio podcast Prosecuting Donald Trump, where ongoing legal cases against the former president were discussed. During the first year, more than 100 episodes were broadcast. When Donald Trump was reelected president in 2024, McCord and Weissmann switched the focus of their discussions to a new MSNBC audio podcast – Main Justice – about the US Department of Justice with regard to assaults on US democracy, its laws and its Constitution. The May 10, 2025 podcast also was published on the Weissmann May 10, 2025 episode of his Substack newsletter that is entitled, Behind The Headlines.

Within the United States Foreign Intelligence Surveillance Court of Review and the Foreign Intelligence Surveillance Court, McCord has the distinction of being a "statutorily designated amicus curiae".

Because of McCord's expertise in the rule of law and domestic terrorism, she has contributed articles for publication in the following media outlets:

- The Atlantic
- Lawfare
- The New York Times
- The Washington Post

As a national security analyst, McCord has appeared in the following broadcast media:

- ABC
- CBS
- MSNBC
- NPR
- PBS

Select appearances on C-SPAN have included:

- January 6 Committee Investigators on Violent Domestic Extremism (February 23, 2023)
- U.S. Mayors on Combating Hate Crimes and Violent Extremism (January 18, 2023)
- Washington Journal – Mary McCord on Political Violence and Election Threats (November 1, 2022)
- Atlantic Council Discussion on Combating Domestic Extremism (April 6, 2021)
- Atlantic Council Discussion on Domestic Terrorism Threat (January 25, 2021)
- Domestic Extremism and International Terrorism (September 16, 2019)

== Awards ==
In 2019, the Virginia Trial Lawyers' Association presented McCord their Oliver White Hill Courageous Advocate Award for:

...leading a legal team to ensure white supremacists and other radical groups could not reassemble in Charlottesville following their rally in 2017.

Legal offices
| Preceded by | Principal Deputy Assistant Attorney General for the National Security Division; 2014–2016 | Succeeded by |
| Preceded by John P. Carlin | United States Assistant Attorney General for the National Security Division; Acting; 2016–2017 | Succeeded by Dana Boente; Acting |
