= Monty Wilkinson (lawyer) =

American lawyer

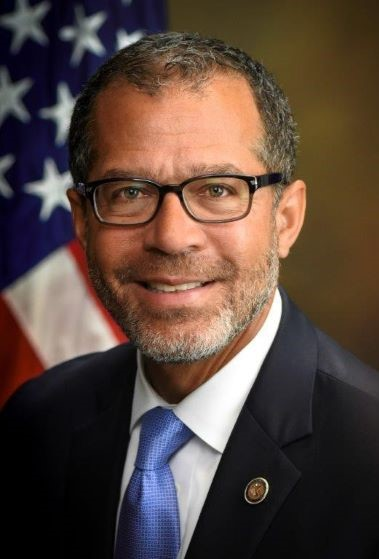

Acting United States Attorney General
- In office January 20, 2021 – March 11, 2021
- President: Joe Biden
- Deputy: John P. Carlin (acting)
- Preceded by: John Demers (acting)
- Succeeded by: Merrick Garland

Personal details
- Born: Robert Montague Wilkinson
- Party: Democratic Party
- Education: Dartmouth College (BA); Georgetown University (JD)

Robert Montague "Monty" Wilkinson is an American lawyer who has spent his entire career at the Justice Department. He served as acting United States Attorney General from January 20 to March 11, 2021. Wilkinson was the director of the Executive Office for United States Attorneys from 2021-2023.

== Education ==
Wilkinson graduated from Dartmouth College in 1983 and from the Georgetown University Law Center in 1988.

== Career ==
In 1989, Wilkinson served as a law clerk to Eric Holder, then a judge of the Superior Court of the District of Columbia. He joined the U.S. Department of Justice as a trial attorney in 1990 and subsequently worked as special counsel and spokesperson for the U.S. Attorney for the District of Columbia, becoming an associate deputy attorney general in 1997. Wilkinson worked for the Court Services and Offender Supervision Agency, the office of the U.S. Attorney for the District of Columbia, and the law firm Troutman Sanders, before being appointed deputy chief of staff and counselor to the attorney general in 2009.

In 2011, Wilkinson was appointed principal deputy director and chief of staff of the Executive Office for United States Attorneys, and was appointed its director in 2014. In 2017, he was appointed senior counselor in the Office of the Assistant Attorney General for Administration, and in 2019 he was appointed Deputy Assistant Attorney General for Human Resources and Administration.

From January 20, 2021 until March 11, 2021, Wilkinson served as acting United States Attorney General under President Joe Biden.

Following Merrick Garland's confirmation as Attorney General, Wilkinson was reappointed director of the Executive Office for United States Attorneys, a position he previously held from 2014 to 2017.

Political offices
Preceded by John Demers; Acting	United States Attorney General; Acting; 2021	Succeeded by Merrick Garland
