= Mark Lesko =

American attorney

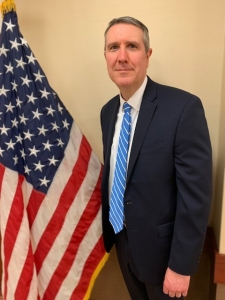

Acting United States Assistant Attorney General for the National Security Division
- In office June 21, 2021 – November 1, 2021
- President: Joe Biden
- Preceded by: John Demers
- Succeeded by: Matthew G. Olsen

Acting United States Attorney for the Eastern District of New York
- In office March 19, 2021 – June 21, 2021
- President: Joe Biden
- Preceded by: Seth DuCharme (acting)
- Succeeded by: Jacquelyn M. Kasulis (acting)

Personal details
- Born: February 4, 1967 (age 59)
- Party: Democratic
- Education: Yale University (BA); Georgetown University (JD)

Mark J. Lesko (born February 4, 1967) is an American politician and attorney who served as the acting Assistant Attorney General for the National Security Division at the United States Justice Department. Prior to that, from January 20, 2021, he was named as acting United States Attorney for the Eastern District of New York. In addition to his career as a prosecutor in the United States Department of Justice, Lesko served as town supervisor of Brookhaven, New York.

== Early life and education ==
Lesko is a native of Washington, D.C. and graduated from Sidwell Friends School. He earned a Bachelor of Arts degree in history from Yale University, where he was a quarterback on the varsity football team. In 1994, Lesko received his Juris Doctor from Georgetown University Law School, graduating on the dean's list and serving as a notes editor of the Georgetown Immigration Law Journal.

== Career ==
After graduating from law school, Lesko practiced law at firms in Pittsburgh and Washington, D.C. He then served as assistant United States Attorney for 10 years. From 1999 to 2002, he was based in the District of Columbia and the Eastern District of New York from 2002 to 2009.

As of 2009, Lesko was the Democratic candidate for the open Brookhaven town supervisor position, which was vacated by Democrat Brian X. Foley in the past election. Foley was elected to the New York State Senate and a special election is scheduled to be held on March 31, 2009, to decide his successor. Lesko was endorsed by Foley. His opponent was town councilman Republican Tim Mazzei. The special election for town supervisor on March 31, 2009, saw over 14% turnout according to the Suffolk County Board of Elections. Lesko defeated Mazzei by over 4000 votes and he assumed office as the supervisor of Brookhaven.

Lesko served as deputy chief of the Long Island Criminal Division, where he ran the U.S. Attorney's office on Long Island and managed all federal investigations and prosecutions in Brookhaven. From 2015 to 2018, Lesko was the vice president for economic development of Hofstra University. In 2018, Lesko rejoined the United States Department of Justice, first serving as special counsel to the United States Attorney from the Eastern District of New York in Brooklyn. In March 2019, he became first deputy U.S. Attorney under Richard Donoghue. On March 19, 2021, after the resignation of U.S. Attorney Seth DuCharme, Lesko became acting United States Attorney for the Eastern District of New York.

== Personal life ==
Lesko and his wife Karen reside in East Setauket, New York.

Legal offices
Preceded by John Demers	United States Assistant Attorney General for the National Security Division; Acting; 2021	Succeeded by Matthew G. Olsen
Preceded by Seth DuCharme; Acting	United States Attorney for the Eastern District of New York; Acting; 2021	Succeeded by Jacquelyn M. Kasulis; Acting
Preceded by Brian X. Foley	Town of Brookhaven, Supervisor; 2009–2012	Succeeded by Edward P. Romaine
