= Neil MacBride =

American lawyer (born 1965)

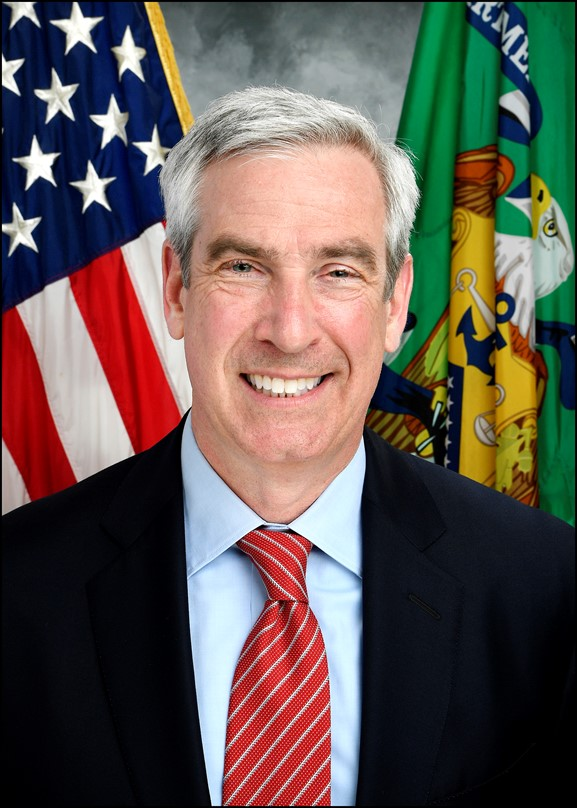

General Counsel of the United States Department of the Treasury
- In office February 22, 2022 – June 28, 2024
- President: Joe Biden
- Preceded by: Brian Callanan
- Succeeded by: Brian Morrisey

United States Attorney for the Eastern District of Virginia
- In office September 18, 2009 – September 13, 2013
- President: Barack Obama
- Preceded by: Chuck Rosenberg
- Succeeded by: Dana Boente

Personal details
- Born: October 14, 1965 (age 61) Schenectady, New York, U.S.
- Party: Democratic
- Education: Houghton College; University of Virginia

Neil Harvey MacBride (born October 14, 1965) is an American attorney who served as the General Counsel of the Department of the Treasury in the Biden administration. He previously served as the United States Attorney for the Eastern District of Virginia. The U.S. Senate unanimously confirmed MacBride's nomination as U.S. Attorney on September 15, 2009, and he took office three days later. He left office on September 13, 2013.

== Early life and education ==
MacBride was born in Schenectady, New York. He earned a Bachelor of Arts degree in history and the humanities from Houghton University and a Juris Doctor from the University of Virginia School of Law.

== Career ==
Prior to his appointment by President Barack Obama, MacBride served as an associate deputy attorney general at the Department of Justice.

MacBride formerly served as vice president, anti-piracy and general counsel, of the Business Software Alliance, where he oversaw global anti-piracy enforcement and copyright policy. Prior to that, he served as staff director and chief counsel to Senator Joseph R. Biden, Jr. (D-Del.) on the Senate Judiciary Committee from 2001 to 2005. From 1996 to 2001, MacBride was an Assistant United States Attorney in the Criminal Division of the United States Attorney's Office for the District of Columbia. Before his stint in public service, MacBride practiced law with the Washington, D.C., law firm of Verner, Liipfert, Bernhard, McPherson and Hand. He also served as a judicial law clerk to U.S. District Court Judge Henry Coke Morgan, Jr. in the Eastern District of Virginia.

He is a barrister with the Edward Bennett Williams Inn of Court and serves on the board of advisors of the Center on Law & Security at New York University.

He was the lead prosecutor in the Megaupload controversy.

In November 2020, MacBride was named a volunteer member of the Joe Biden presidential transition Agency Review Team to support transition efforts related to the United States Department of Justice.

=== Nomination to be general counsel ===
On June 3, 2021, President Biden nominated MacBride to be the next general counsel of the Department of the Treasury. The Senate's Finance Committee held hearings on his nomination on September 22, 2021. On December 16, 2021, the committee voted to favorably report his nomination to the Senate floor. On February 9, 2022, the entire Senate confirmed MacBride's nomination by a vote of 61–33. He was sworn in on February 22, 2022. He resigned in June 2024.
