= DICE (DEA database) =

DEA database, consists largely of phone log and Internet data

The DEA Internet Connectivity Endeavor or DICE is a Drug Enforcement Administration database that consists largely of phone log and Internet data gathered legally by the DEA through subpoenas, arrests, and search warrants nationwide. DICE includes about 1 billion records, and they are kept for about a year and then purged.
