= Brian X. Foley =

American politician (born 1957)

Member of the New York State Senate from the 3rd district
- In office January 1, 2009 – December 31, 2010
- Preceded by: Caesar Trunzo
- Succeeded by: Lee Zeldin

Personal details
- Born: December 3, 1957 (age 68)
- Party: Democratic
- Children: 2
- Education: Saint Michael's College (BA)

Brian X. Foley (born December 3, 1957) is an American politician who served as a member of the New York State Senate in 2009 and 2010. A member of the Democratic Party, he previously served as a member of the Suffolk County Legislature.

== Early life and education ==
A graduate of St. Anthony's High School, Foley continued his education at Saint Michael's College in Colchester, Vermont, where he earned a Bachelor of Arts degree in American studies.

== Career ==
He was re-elected five times to the seat once held by his father, John Foley. In 2005, he was elected supervisor of Brookhaven, New York. In 2008, he was elected to the State Senate, after defeating 36-year (18 term) incumbent Republican, Caesar Trunzo. He was the first Democrat elected to the State Senate from Suffolk County since 1902.

He has served on the Brookhaven Roe YMCA Board of Directors, Brookhaven Memorial Hospital Advisory Board, Patchogue Chamber of Commerce, Suffolk County Community Mediation Center, Sunrise District Boy Scouts of America and the Suffolk County Coalition Against Domestic Violence. In 2004, the Bayport Blue Point Chamber of Commerce presented Foley with its Dedicated Public Service Award. He has been recognized as Person of the Year by the Medford Youth Athletic Association Award in 2000 and the Farmingville Historical Society in 1999.

=== Marriage Equality Debate 2009 ===
Brian X. Foley was seen as a key swing senate vote in the 2009 Marriage Equality debate in New York State. In April 2009, Governor David Paterson announced that he would introduce a Marriage Equality bill in the New York State Legislature. Foley voted in favor of Marriage Equality legislation on December 2, 2009, but the bill was defeated.

=== MTA bailout proposal ===
Foley supported an MTA bailout that included a controversial payroll tax on employers. Foley, had balked at the payroll tax because it affected school districts and would likely raise property taxes. In 2009, Foley pledged his support for the MTA bailout.

=== 2010 defeat ===
Foley was defeated by Republican Lee Zeldin on November 2, 2010. Senator-Elect Zeldin received 57% of votes cast, defeating Foley by 14 points.

== Personal life ==
Foley resides in Blue Point, New York with his wife and their two children.

== See also ==
- 2009 New York State Senate leadership crisis

New York State Senate
Preceded by Caesar Trunzo	New York State Senate, 3rd District; 2009–2010	Succeeded by Lee Zeldin
Political offices
Preceded by	Suffolk County Legislature, 7th District; 1993–2005	Succeeded by Jack Eddington
Preceded by John Jay LaValle	Town of Brookhaven, Supervisor; 2005–2009	Succeeded by Mark Lesko
Preceded by Hugh Farley	Chair Person of the Senate Committee on Banks; 2009–2010	Succeeded by Joseph Griffo
