= John Eisenberg =

American lawyer (born 1967)

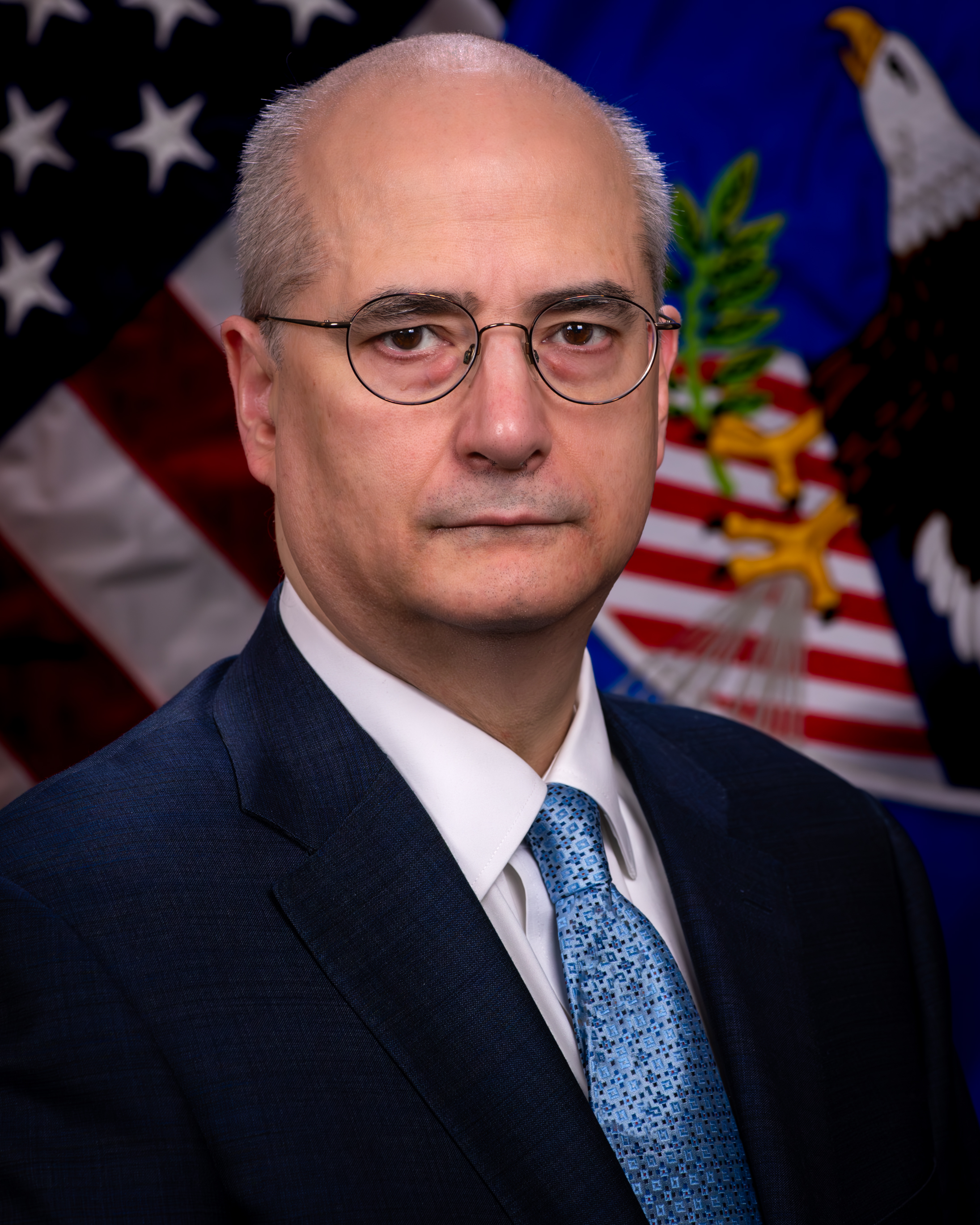

United States Assistant Attorney General for the National Security Division
- In office June 5, 2025 – November 6, 2026
- President: Donald Trump
- Preceded by: Matthew G. Olsen

Personal details
- Born: John Andrew Eisenberg; February 1967 (age 59) Boston, Massachusetts, U.S.
- Party: Republican
- Education: Stanford University (BS); Yale University (JD)

John Andrew Eisenberg (born February 1967) is an American lawyer who served as the United States assistant attorney general for the National Security Division from 2025 to 2026. He previously served as a deputy counsel to the President of the United States and legal advisor to the U.S. National Security Council during the first presidency of Donald Trump. He was selected by former National Security Advisor Michael Flynn. Earlier in his career, from 2006 to 2009, he served in the Department of Justice.

== Early life and career ==
Eisenberg received a Bachelor of Science in mathematics from Stanford University and a Juris Doctor from Yale Law School. He worked as an associate deputy attorney general during the Presidency of George W. Bush. He was a partner in the Washington, D.C. law office of Kirkland & Ellis.

In 2017, Eisenberg was appointed Deputy Assistant to the President, National Security Council Legal Advisor, and Deputy Counsel to the President for National Security Affairs by former National Security Advisor Michael Flynn and part of the National Security Council.

== Trump Tower wiretapping allegations ==
On March 29, 2017, The New York Times reported that Michael Ellis and Ezra Cohen were involved in the sharing of intelligence documents to Representative Devin Nunes, chair of the House Intelligence Committee. The following day, The Washington Post reported that Eisenberg was also involved. In April 2017, the Associated Press quoted a U.S. official as saying that although Cohen had access to those kinds of intelligence materials, he did not play a role in helping Nunes gain access to the documents. According to a U.S. official, Cohen was not involved in showing the material to Nunes, did not clear Nunes onto the White House grounds, did not review the material with Nunes, and was not even aware that the material was going to be shared with Nunes.

== Trump–Ukraine scandal ==
Eisenberg ordered a transcript of a Trump call with Ukraine's president be moved to a highly classified server and played a role in the Justice Department's early handling of the Trump–Ukraine scandal. The whistleblower initially submitted concerns anonymously to Courtney Elwood, general counsel of the CIA. Elwood then contacted Justice Department officials and Eisenberg. Eisenberg was notified by both Fiona Hill and Alexander Vindman that they were concerned about inappropriate comments to Ukrainian officials by European Union Ambassador Gordon Sondland and President Donald Trump.

Per Vindman's testimony, Eisenberg instructed Vindman not to tell anyone about the Trump call to President Volodymyr Zelenskyy. In early November 2019, Eisenberg was subpoenaed to testify by the House Intelligence Committee but refused.

== Assistant attorney general ==
On February 19, 2025, President Donald Trump announced Eisenberg as his nominee to serve as the assistant attorney general for the National Security Division. His nomination was sent to the U.S. Senate on March 10, 2025. On March 26, 2025, a hearing on his nomination was held before the Senate Judiciary Committee and on April 9, 2025, a hearing was held before the Senate Select Committee on Intelligence. On May 1 and May 6, he was reported out of each committee, respectively. On June 5, the Senate invoked cloture on his nomination by a 52–43 vote. Later that day, his nomination was confirmed by a 52–43 vote.

Eisenberg resigned on November 6, 2026.

== See also ==
- Timeline of investigations into Trump and Russia (2017)
- Timeline of investigations into Trump and Russia (2019)

Legal offices
Preceded by Matthew G. Olsen	United States Assistant Attorney General for the National Security Division; 2025–present	Incumbent
