= Caesar Trunzo =

American politician

Member of the New York State Senate from the 3rd district
- In office January 1, 1973 – December 31, 2008
- Preceded by: Ralph J. Marino
- Succeeded by: Brian X. Foley

Personal details
- Born: May 11, 1926 Brooklyn, New York
- Died: May 28, 2013 (aged 87)
- Party: Republican
- Spouse: Lorraine
- Children: 2
- Education: Heffley & Browne Business College

Caesar Trunzo (May 11, 1926 – May 28, 2013) was an American politician from the state of New York. A Republican, Trunzo served in the New York State Senate from 1973 to 2008.

== Life ==
Trunzo was born in 1926, in Brooklyn. He graduated from Fort Hamilton High School, Brooklyn, and Heffley & Browne Business College. He served in the U.S. Army from 1944 to 1946. He married Lorraine, and had two children. They lived in Brentwood, Suffolk County, New York.

Trunzo was an Accounting Supervisor of Fairchild Stratos Corp., Bay Shore, New York, and Chief Accountant and Assistant Treasurer of Dayton T. Brown, Inc., Bohemia, New York. He also entered politics as a Republican. He was a member of the Islip Town Planning Board from 1959 until he became councilman of the Town of Islip in 1965. As an Islip town councilman, he oversaw the performance of the Islip Town Recreation Department; Assessor's Office; Receiver of Taxes Office; Brentwood Water District, and the Data Process Department.

He was a member of the New York State Senate from 1973 to 2008. In November 2008, he ran for re-election, but was defeated by Brian X. Foley.

Trunzo remained town party chairman until March 2009. He died on May 28, 2013.

New York State Senate
| Preceded by Ralph J. Marino | Member of the New York State Senate from the 3rd district 1973–2008 | Succeeded by Brian X. Foley |
