= Phone log =

A phone log is metadata collected from telephone or mobile phones for the purpose of surveillance or espionage. This metadata may include: length of calls, phone numbers of both parties, phone-specific identification information, GPS location, call proximity, and/or computer converted voice-to-text transcripts of the phone call conversation. The advantage of converting audio to ASCII text metadata is that this makes it easy to search for keywords and phrases, and ASCII text metadata can be easily stored on conventional database systems for several years. Phone logs are not limited to governmental collection. For example, some private sector companies, such as banks, are known to collect phone log data on their internal phone network of all calls within and between the company and outside parties.

DICE is a known governmental phone log database maintained by the DEA consisting largely of phone log and Internet data gathered legally by the DEA through subpoenas, arrests and search warrants nationwide. DICE includes about 1 billion records, and records are kept for about a year and then purged.

The Phone Log also refers to a program or app that allows people to manually log their interactions from different sources (such as phone, SMS, email, face to face).

== See also ==
- Pen Register
- Hampton Roads Telephone Analysis Sharing Network
