= Office of Intelligence Policy and Review =

Staff agency overview
- Dissolved: 2006
- Superseding Staff agency: National Security Division
- Jurisdiction: United States government agency
- Status: Defunct
- Headquarters: United States Department of Justice
- Staff agency executive: Staff Counsel
- Parent department: United States Department of Justice
- Key document: Foreign Intelligence Surveillance Act (1978), USA PATRIOT Act (2001), USA PATRIOT Act reauthorization (2005)

The Office of Intelligence Policy and Review (OIPR) was a staff agency within the United States Department of Justice. It was responsible for handling all Justice Department requests for surveillance authorizations under the terms of the 1978 Foreign Intelligence Surveillance Act (FISA), advising the Attorney General and Intelligence Community on legal issues relating to national security and surveillance, and intelligence legislation coordination.

The staff counsel often testified before Congress on behalf of the Clinton and Bush administration intelligence policies, including defending the USA PATRIOT Act before the House Judiciary Committee.

The OIPR was amalgamated into the National Security Division created under Section 506 of the 2005 USA PATRIOT Act reauthorization, which was signed into law by President George W. Bush on March 9, 2006.
