= Chuck Rosenberg =

Former United States Attorney, Eastern District of Virginia

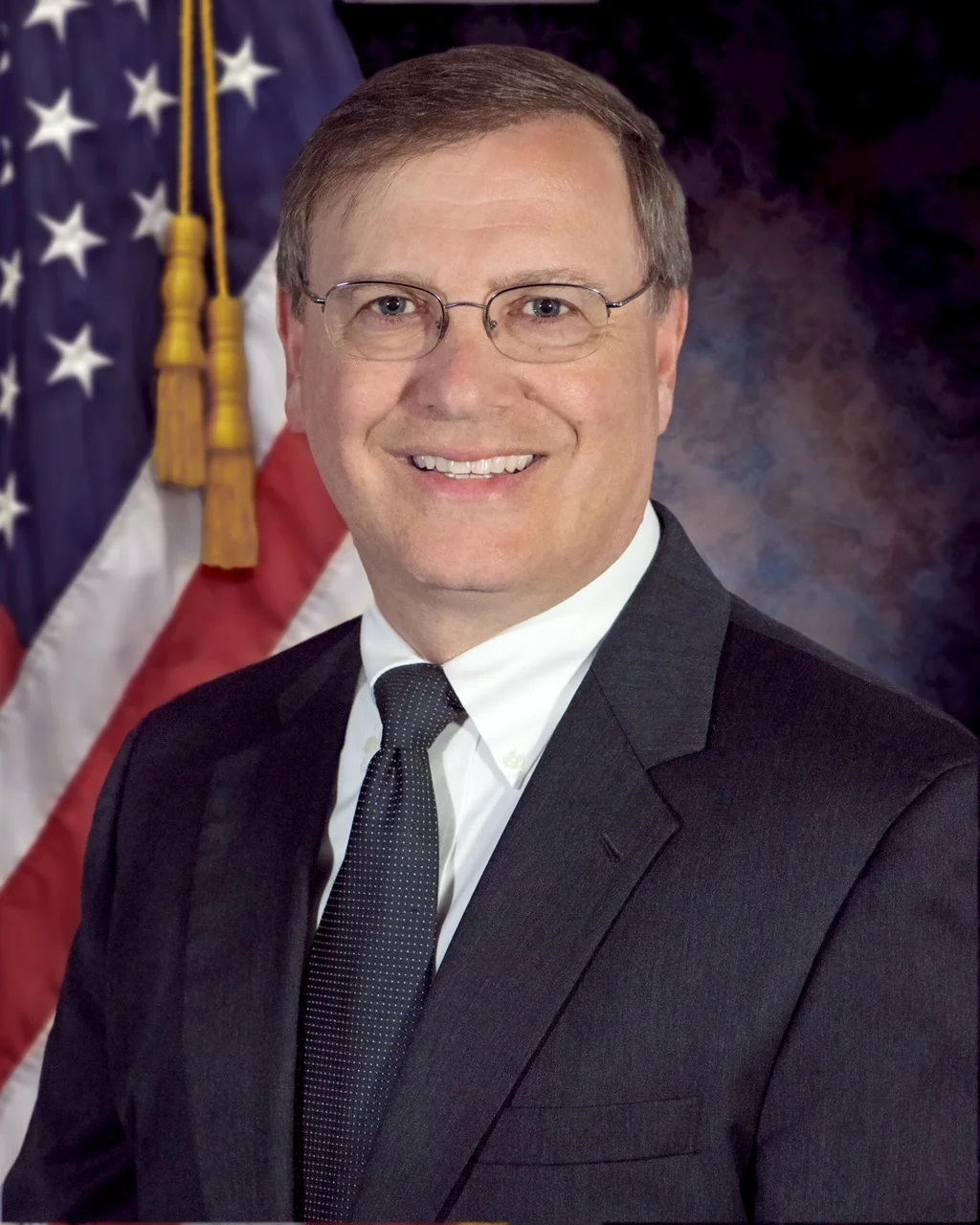

Acting Administrator of the Drug Enforcement Administration
- In office May 18, 2015 – October 1, 2017
- President: Barack Obama; Donald Trump
- Preceded by: Michele Leonhart
- Succeeded by: Robert W. Patterson (Acting)

United States Attorney for the Eastern District of Virginia
- In office June 2006 – October 2008
- President: George W. Bush
- Preceded by: Paul McNulty
- Succeeded by: Neil MacBride

Acting United States Attorney for the Southern District of Texas
- In office June 2005 – March 2006
- President: George W. Bush
- Preceded by: Michael T. Shelby
- Succeeded by: Donald DeGabrielle

Personal details
- Born: Charles Philip Rosenberg; September 10, 1960 (age 65)
- Education: Tufts University (BA); Harvard University (MPP); University of Virginia (JD)

Chuck Rosenberg is an American attorney who served as Acting Administrator of the Drug Enforcement Administration from 2015 to 2017. He formerly served as the U.S. Attorney for the Eastern District of Virginia (EDVA) and for the Southern District of Texas; as a senior FBI official on the staff of two FBI Directors; as Counselor to the Attorney General; as the Chief of Staff to the Deputy Attorney General; and as an Assistant U.S. Attorney in the Eastern District of Virginia in Norfolk and Alexandria.

== Biography ==
Rosenberg was born in Brooklyn and raised in Nassau County on Long Island. He received his B.A. (1982) from Tufts University, his M.P.P. (1985) from Harvard University and his J.D. (1990) from the University of Virginia. He was hired into the Justice Department straight out of law school through the Attorney General's Honors Program and served in numerous positions throughout the Department of Justice, including as a Trial Attorney for the Tax Division's Northern Criminal Enforcement Section (1990–94), Assistant U.S. Attorney in the Eastern District of Virginia (1994-2000), Counsel to FBI Director Robert Mueller (2002–03), Counselor to Attorney General John Ashcroft (2003–04) and Chief of Staff to Deputy Attorney General James Comey (2004–05).

Rosenberg was nominated by George W. Bush and unanimously confirmed by the Senate to serve as the U.S. Attorney for the Eastern District of Virginia (2006–08); previously, he was appointed by Alberto Gonzales to serve as the acting U.S. Attorney for the Southern District of Texas (2005–06).

Rosenberg later served as Chief of Staff to the Director of the FBI (2013–15). In this role, he worked closely with James Comey and other senior FBI officials on counterterrorism, intelligence, cyber and criminal investigative issues, including with international, federal, state and local law enforcement partners.

Rosenberg also spent time working in private practice as Counsel at Hunton & Williams (2000–02), as a partner at Hogan Lovells (2008–13), and as a senior counsel and member of the White Collar & Regulatory Enforcement Group at Crowell & Moring (2017–present).

== Notable cases ==
While serving as the U.S. Attorney for the Eastern District of Virginia, Rosenberg initiated several noteworthy prosecutions. His office brought dogfighting charges against suspended Atlanta Falcons quarterback Michael Vick, who was sentenced to 23 months in prison after court hearings that drew protesters and animal rights activists.

Rosenberg was heavily involved in the government's capital punishment case against convicted September 11 conspirator Zacarias Moussaoui, who was sentenced to life in prison in 2006.

Other priorities during Rosenberg's term as U.S. Attorney included child pornography cases, violent crime, and mortgage fraud.

During his years as a federal prosecutor, Rosenberg conducted grand jury investigations and has been the lead trial lawyer in many federal prosecutions involving espionage, kidnapping, murder, crimes against children, and complex financial fraud cases.

"Throughout his distinguished career in law enforcement and public service, Chuck has earned the trust and the praise of his colleagues at every level," said former Attorney General Loretta Lynch. "He has proven himself as an exceptional leader, a skilled problem-solver, and a consummate public servant of unshakeable integrity. And he has demonstrated, time and again, his deep and unwavering commitment not only to the women and men who secure our nation, but to the fundamental values that animate their service."

== Resignation from DEA ==
In August 2017, Rosenberg – as a holdover appointee from the Obama administration – found himself at odds with the Trump administration over the President's remarks encouraging that the police "be rough" with suspects. His internal memo to the DEA workforce gained public attention for Rosenberg's repudiation of Trump's remarks. In it, Rosenberg wrote: "The President, in remarks delivered yesterday in New York, condoned police misconduct regarding the treatment of individuals placed under arrest by law enforcement... I write to offer a strong reaffirmation of the operating principles to which we, as law enforcement professionals, adhere. I write because we have an obligation to speak out when something is wrong. That's what law enforcement officers do. That's what you do. We fix stuff. At least, we try." The Washington Post editorial board, in a piece entitled "A divided nation gets moral guidance - but not from Trump," wrote: "His letter was important not as a rebuke to the president but as a model of leadership and courage in reaffirming democratic values."

On September 26, 2017, it was announced that Rosenberg, dismayed by the Trump administration, was stepping down. His resignation became effective October 1, 2017. It was announced on October 3, 2017, that Robert W. Patterson, who had been serving as the DEA's Principal Deputy Administrator since November 2016, had succeeded Rosenberg as Acting Administrator for the DEA.

== MS NOW ==
On November 13, 2017, Rosenberg initiated his role as an MS NOW (then MSNBC) contributor with an interview on The Rachel Maddow Show. He has been a frequent commentator on MS NOW and NBC since then, lending his expertise on a wide range of legal and policy issues. He is also the host of the MS NOW podcast The Oath with Chuck Rosenberg.

Political offices
Preceded by Michele Leonhart	Administrator of the Drug Enforcement Administration; Acting; 2015–2017	Succeeded by Robert W. Patterson; Acting
