= Barbara Starr =

American journalist (born 1950)

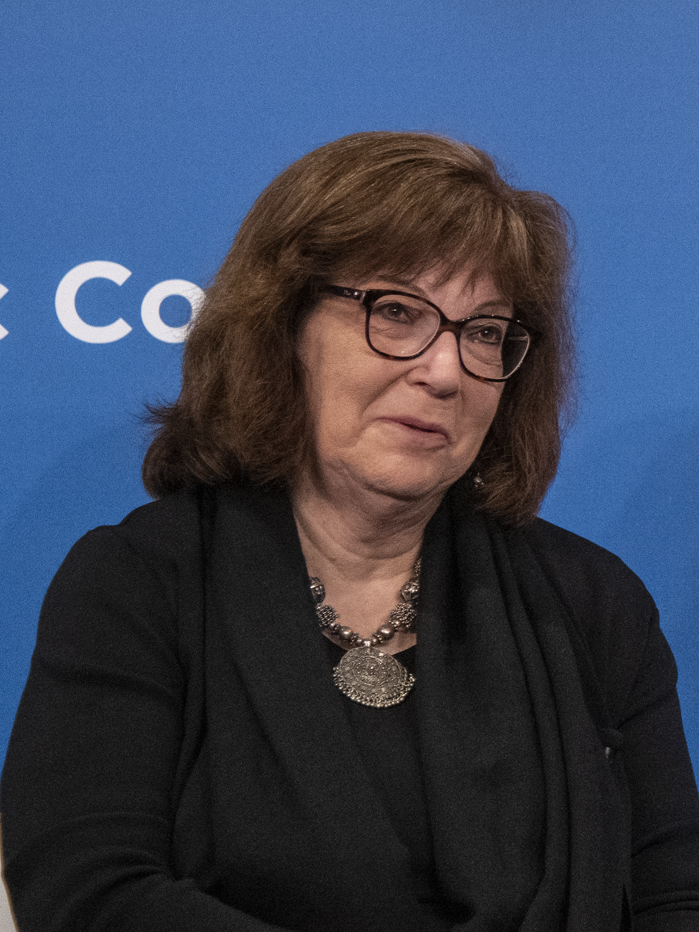
- Starr in 2019
- Born: September 11, 1950 (age 75)
- Education: California State University, Northridge
- Occupation: Journalist
- Employer: CNN

Barbara Starr (born September 11, 1950) is an American television news journalist who most recently worked for CNN. She was the network's Pentagon correspondent, based in Washington, D.C., from 2001 to 2022.

== Career ==
Starr is a graduate of the California State University, Northridge, from which she earned a degree in journalism. From 1979 to 1988, she was a correspondent for Business Week magazine, covering energy matters. She then worked for the news magazine Jane's Defence Weekly from 1988 to 1997 covering national security and defense policy before joining ABC News as a producer, covering the Pentagon, for which she won an Emmy Award.

In 2001, Starr joined CNN as the lead Pentagon correspondent, covering national security issues including the wars in Iraq, Afghanistan and Syria. She served on the board of the Pentagon Press Association for several years, and was reportedly described by colleagues and competitors as "a mentor."

Starr has received criticism for her reporting, having been called "a spokesperson for the Pentagon."

In June 2013, MSNBC reporter Chris Hayes ran a segment, in which he argued that Starr's publication of leaked information was at least as potentially harmful to national security as those published by Glenn Greenwald of The Guardian.

In July 2015, Starr received criticism from Kenyans through a Twitter hashtag that trended for several hours on the Internet when she called Kenya a "terror hotbed" as President Obama headed to the East African nation. She was referring to the security threat posed by Al-Shabaab militants operating from neighboring Somalia.

In May 2021, it was revealed that the Trump administration had secretly fought a legal battle with CNN for over a year in an effort to obtain Starr's phone and email records from 2017 as part of a leak probe. The Justice Department, under the leadership of Attorney General William Barr, petitioned a magistrate court in Virginia to send a secret order to CNN compelling it to produce records of Starr's emails kept on company servers. CNN's general counsel, David Vigilante, was under a gag order preventing him from sharing the details of the government's efforts, including with Starr herself. The Biden administration's Justice Department informed CNN and Starr of the probe and said that Starr was never the target of the investigation. President Biden subsequently said that he would not allow his Justice Department to seize journalists' phone or email records, calling the practice "simply wrong."

Starr announced her departure from CNN in December 2022. As of 2026, she appears on MSNOW.
