= Hampton Roads Telephone Analysis Sharing Network =

The Hampton Roads Telephone Analysis Sharing Network was a program through which law enforcement agencies in five Virginia cities access a shared database containing phone records and contents of seized mobile devices. The program was active from 2012 to 2015.

== Participating cities ==
- Hampton
- Newport News
- Norfolk
- Chesapeake
- Suffolk

== Sharing ==
Participating agencies have, through a memorandum of understanding, agreed to "share telephone intelligence information derived from any source with the (task force) including: subpoenaed telephone call detail records, subpoenaed telephone subscriber information, and seized mobile devices."

== Controversy ==
Rob Poggenklass, an ACLU staff attorney, stated that the program violates Virginia's Government Data Collection and Dissemination Practices Act. The Virginia State Police stated that they declined to join, citing the same statute.

== Termination ==
In 2015, Chesapeake asked Virginia Attorney General Mark Herring for a formal opinion on whether the program was legal under Virginia law. The official response delivered in November 2015 was that the examination was closed because the program had been terminated. Newport News Police Chief Rick Myers said that the task force had joined a federal data-sharing program which required search warrants.
