= John Demers =

American attorney (born 1971)

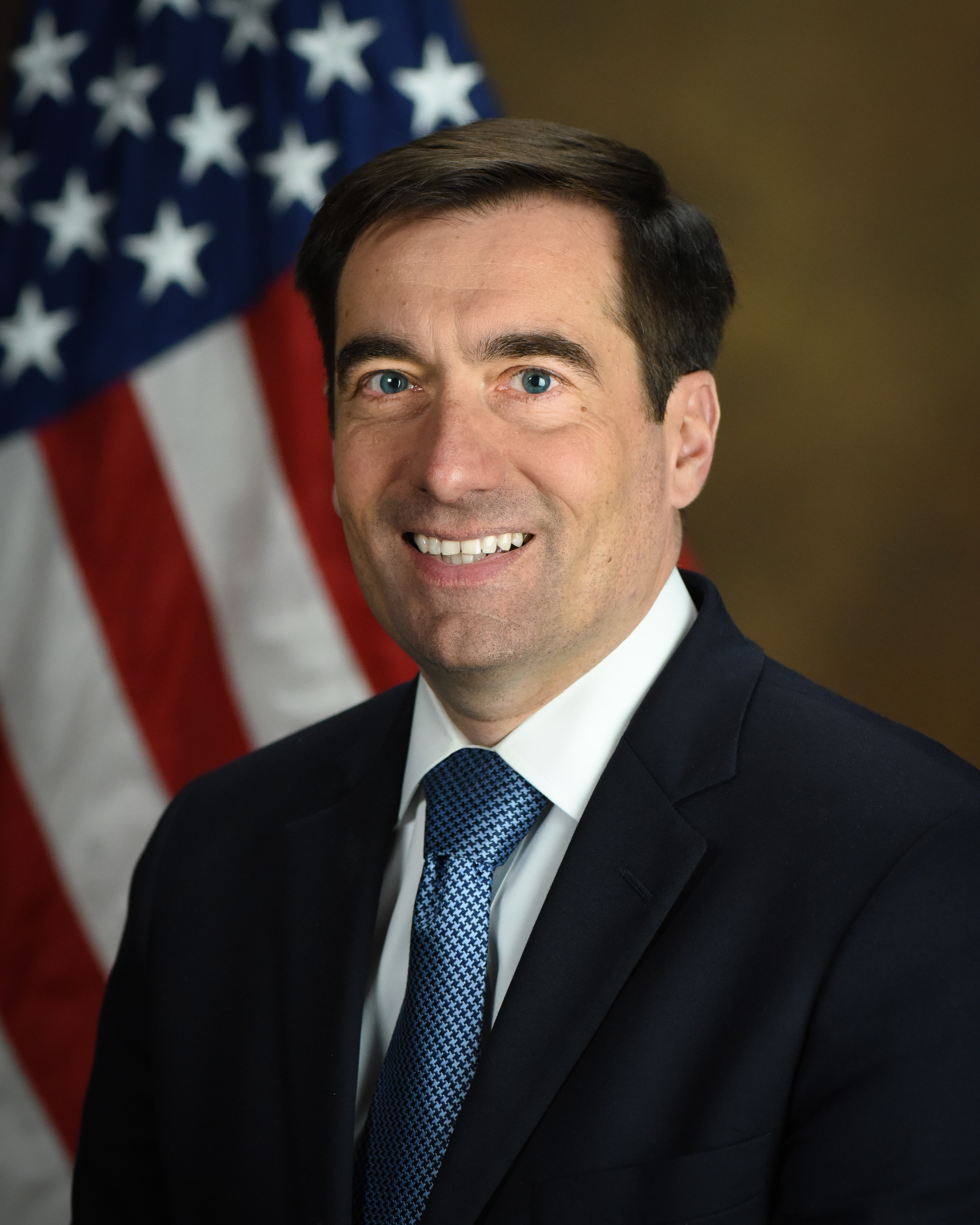
- Official portrait, 2018

United States Assistant Attorney General for the National Security Division
- In office February 22, 2018 – June 25, 2021
- President: Donald Trump; Joe Biden
- Preceded by: John P. Carlin
- Succeeded by: Matthew G. Olsen

Acting United States Attorney General
- In office January 20, 2021
- President: Joe Biden
- Deputy: John P. Carlin (acting)
- Preceded by: Jeffrey A. Rosen (acting)
- Succeeded by: Monty Wilkinson (acting)

Deputy Assistant Attorney General for the National Security Division
- In office September 2007 – January 2009
- President: George W. Bush

Personal details
- Born: John Charles Demers; September 21, 1971 (age 55) Gubbio, Italy
- Party: Republican
- Education: College of the Holy Cross (BA); Harvard University (JD)

John Charles Demers (born September 21, 1971) is an Italian-born American lawyer who served as United States Assistant Attorney General for the National Security Division (NSD) from 2018 to 2021. He also served as acting United States Attorney General in his capacity as United States Assistant Attorney General for the NSD for a few hours following the resignation of Jeffrey Rosen at noon on January 20, 2021, until President Joe Biden signed an executive order naming Deputy Assistant Attorney General for Human Resources and Administration Monty Wilkinson as acting United States Attorney General later that day.

As U.S. assistant attorney general for the NSD, Demers was the top official for national security at the U.S. Department of Justice (DOJ). During his tenure in the NSD, he was selected by Attorney General Jeff Sessions to lead the China Initiative and oversaw counterespionage operations in foreign intelligence. Although nominated by President Donald Trump, he also served under the Biden administration, where he was the longest-serving Senate-confirmed official from the Trump administration that was retained.

Demer's exit from the Justice Department garnered attention when the 2017–2018 Department of Justice metadata seizures became publicly known in June 2021, which coincided with his departure. He was eventually succeeded by Matthew G. Olsen. Demers returned to work at Boeing afterward, where he previously had been a vice president and general counsel leading the company's international defense, space, and security affairs.

== Early life and education ==
Demers was born on September 21, 1971, in Gubbio, Italy. His parents are Pina and Frank Demers, and he came from a family of teachers. Demers attended the College of the Holy Cross, where he majored in political science and Italian studies and received the college's Maurizio Vannicelli Prize. He graduated from Holy Cross with his Bachelor of Arts, magna cum laude, in 1993 with membership in Phi Beta Kappa and the Jesuit honor society Alpha Sigma Nu.

After attaining a Watson Fellowship to study in Italy, Demers became a research assistant for the National Center on Addiction and Substance Abuse at Columbia University, then enrolled in Harvard Law School in August 1996. While at Harvard, he had been a classmate and friend of John P. Carlin, who would later serve as acting United States Deputy Attorney General. He clerked at the United States Attorney's Office for the District of Massachusetts in 1997 and was a summer associate at the law firm of Simpson Thacher & Bartlett in 1998.

Demers obtained his Juris Doctor (J.D.), magna cum laude, from Harvard Law School in May 1999. After graduation, he served as a law clerk for Judge Diarmuid O'Scannlain of the U.S. Court of Appeals for the Ninth Circuit from 1999 to 2000. He was a co-clerk with David Lat.

== Legal career ==
In October 2000, Demers became an associate attorney at the law firm of Ropes & Gray. When the September 11 attacks occurred, he recalled that the event "made me want to go to Washington, D.C., to offer my services". He left the firm in May 2003 to serve as an attorney advisor for the Office of Legal Counsel of the U.S. Department of Justice from 2003 to 2005, then clerked for Justice Antonin Scalia at the U.S. Supreme Court from 2005 to 2006.

Demers was on the leadership team of the United States Department of Justice National Security Division, first as senior counsel to the assistant attorney general from 2006 to 2007, then as counsel to the deputy attorney general from January 2007 to June 2007. From September 2007 to January 2009, Demers served as the Deputy Assistant Attorney General for the National Security Division (NSD) in the Justice Department.

As a top official in the NSD, Demers was the head of a group of lawyers responsible for U.S. surveillance law and for representing the department before the U.S. Foreign Intelligence Surveillance Court. Demers also worked with the Director of National Intelligence on the Foreign Intelligence Surveillance Act (FISA), which he helped to draft Section 702, and Executive Order 12333.

Demers was brought to work at the Boeing Company in Arlington, Virginia, by retired judge J. Michael Luttig, formerly of the United States Court of Appeals for the Fourth Circuit. He served as its chief counsel for network and space systems from 2009 to 2011 before assuming positions as the company's vice president and assistant general counsel for global, regulatory, and government law in 2011 and 2016.

== Assistant Attorney General ==
=== Nomination ===
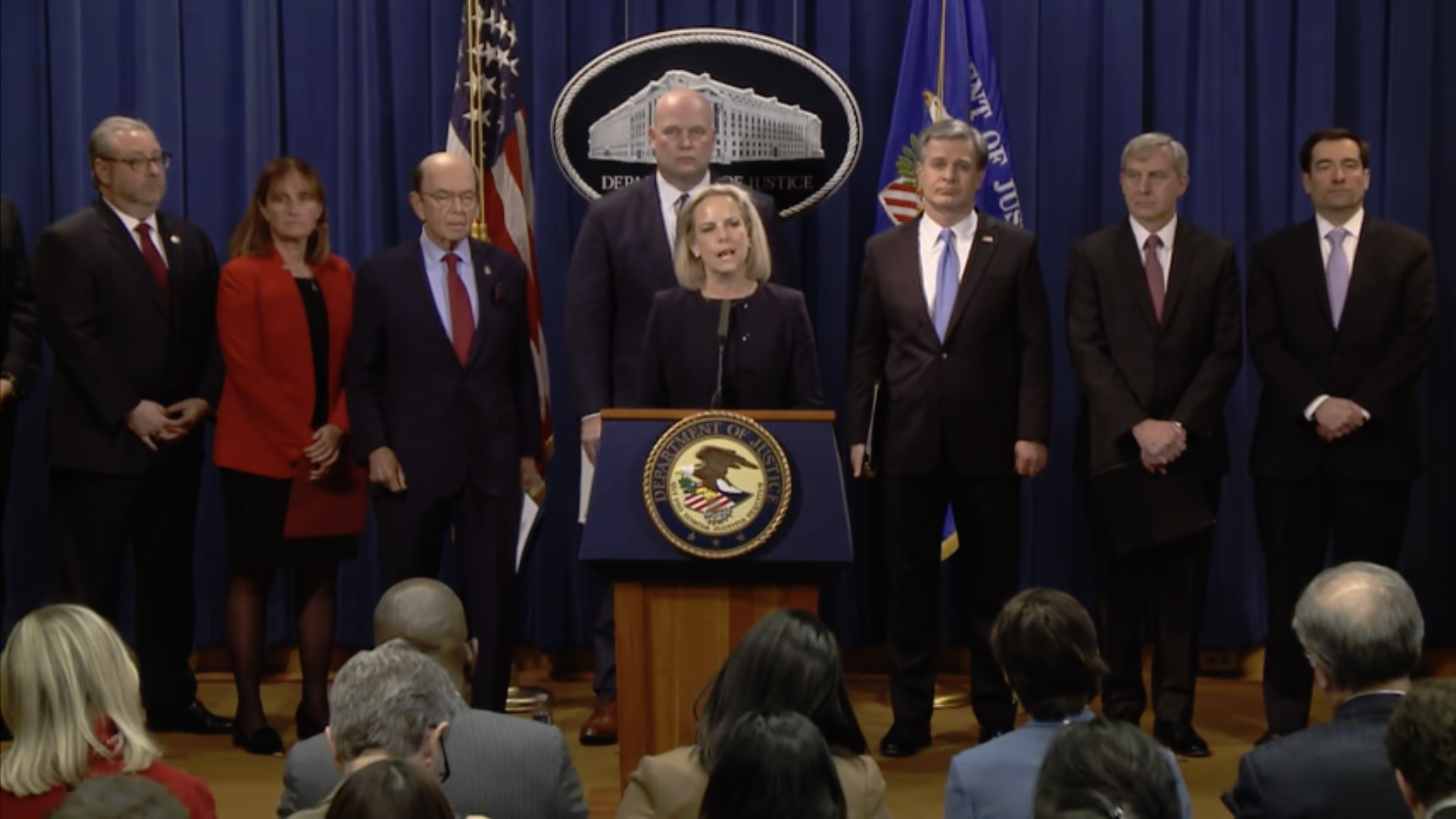
Demers (far right) with other senior Justice Department officials in January 2019

On September 1, 2017, President Donald Trump nominated Demers to be the U.S. assistant attorney general for the National Security Division (NSD). Former officials in the Obama Administration supported Demers' nomination. His confirmation hearing was held before the Senate Judiciary Committee on October 31, 2017. Demers was widely regarded as an uncontroversial candidate, and he was reported out of both the Judiciary Committee and the United States Senate Select Committee on Intelligence without opposition.

Senator Cory Gardner, who stated in January 2018 that he would block some appointments to the DOJ, announced on February 15, 2018, that he would not block Demer's nomination. Demers was confirmed to the position by a voice vote later that month. His appointment to the head of the NSD on February 22, 2018, garnered praise from both Democrats and Republicans as he had worked under the administrations of both parties. The appointment was also welcomed by Attorney General Jeff Sessions.

=== Tenure ===
When Demers became the head of the national security division, the U.S. had recently experienced Russian interference in the 2016 United States elections. Throughout his tenure, issues of national security would be focused on Robert Mueller and the Mueller special counsel investigation. The DOJ would also concentrate on counterintelligence against Chinese influence in academia and research. Under Demer's leadership, the division brought espionage cases against both Chinese Americans and Chinese nationals, charged Russian accountant Elena Khusyaynova for interfering in the 2018 elections, and brought charges against a Turkish bank for violating sanctions placed on Iran. While in office, he was considered among the most apolitical officials appointed by Trump.

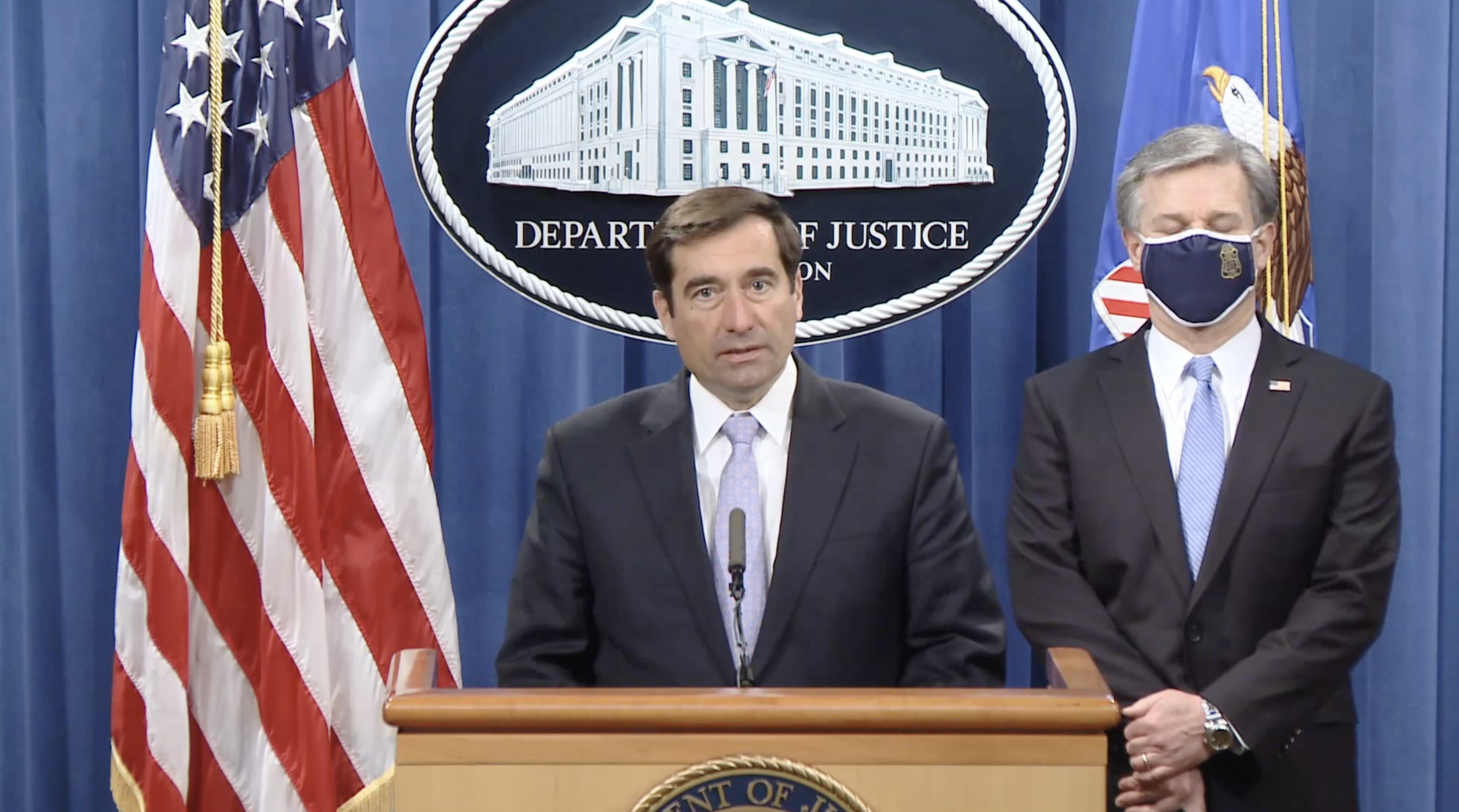
On October 28, 2020, Demers announced the indictment of eight individuals conspiring to act as Chinese agents

In November 2018, the U.S. Department of Justice launched the "China Initiative." The program aimed to counter Chinese espionage and intelligence activities in the U.S. Attorney General Jeff Sessions selected Demers to lead the initiative.

The China Initiative was intended to enable the National Security Division to combat Chinese intellectual property theft, surveillance, and other classified national security threats. According to The New York Times, Demer's effort to focus law enforcement resources as part of the program made the initiative his "signature achievement." The department would prosecute cases involving targeted economic information and charged hackers accused of being affiliated with the People's Liberation Army (PLA), which was involved in the 2017 Equifax data breach. These initiatives were continued by the Department of Justice under Demer's nominated successor, Matthew Olsen, until he would later announce its termination in 2022 amid criticism for racial profiling.

On January 20, 2021, acting attorney general Jeffrey A. Rosen resigned, and it became expected that Monty Wilkinson would serve in the position until Biden's nominee, Merrick Garland, could assume the office. Before Biden signed an executive order naming Wilkinson to succeed Rosen, Demers served as acting attorney general for a few hours that day in the meantime. Demers normally would have also been Rosen's successor, but Biden, relying on a Trump-era precedent, appointed Wilkinson instead. As acting attorney general, Demers was the top official in the Justice Department to approve orders relating to the Foreign Intelligence Surveillance Act (FISA).

That same month, Demers considered resigning from his position when President Donald Trump pressured the Justice Department to pursue claims of election fraud, though he ultimately decided to remain when acting attorney general Jeffrey A. Rosen resisted pressure from the White House to investigate claims of fraud. When the Trump presidency ended, Demers continued to lead the National Security Division under President Joe Biden. He was the only senior Justice Department official from the Trump administration to remain under the Biden administration. He was asked by acting United States deputy attorney general John P. Carlin to remain in the department in order to provide continuity as it would have been months before a new leader for the National Security Division could be confirmed. Senior officials at the agency also repeatedly asked him to remain.

=== Departure ===
On June 14, 2021, Demers announced that he would be stepping down as head of the National Security Division. Though his departure was planned months earlier, it came amid controversy regarding leaks of classified information that were being investigated, during which prosecutors seized records from The New York Times, The Washington Post, and CNN. Senate Majority Leader Chuck Schumer sought to subpoena Demers and called on him to testify before Congress along with Jeff Sessions and William Barr.

According to NBC News, Demers was likely to have been briefed about the Justice Department's subpoenas to reporters, though a senior official stated that his departure was unrelated to the incident. President Biden nominated Matthew G. Olsen to replace him; Demers left the department as its longest-serving Senate-confirmed official from the Trump administration during Biden's presidency. Mark Lesko, the acting Brooklyn U.S. attorney, temporarily succeeded Demers on an acting basis until Matthew G. Olsen was confirmed by the United States Senate and sworn in as Assistant Attorney General for the National Security Division on a permanent basis.

== Personal life ==
Demers is married to Cynthia Marie Zmijewski Demers and has two children, Lizzie and Matthew. After leaving the NSD, it was announced on August 31, 2021, that Demers would return to Boeing as a vice president in a unique role created by the company. As of February 2024, he is a member of Boeing's legal counsel and serves as the company secretary.

From 2010 to 2017, Demers was an adjunct professor of national security law at the Georgetown University Law Center. He is a contributor to the Federalist Society. On January 25, 2023, the National Security Institute of the Antonin Scalia Law School at George Mason University announced that Demers would be a member of its advisory board. Demers is also a member of the board of advisors of the Foundation for Defense of Democracies, and a member of the Aspen Institute's U.S. Cybersecurity Group.

== Selected publications ==
- Richardson, Hila; Califano Jr., Joseph A.; Tapper, Donna; Demers, John (1996). "Substance Abuse and Public Health in Urban America: Analysis of Costs in New York City". Current Issues in Public Health. 2 (98).
- Demers, John; Kleber, Herbert; Califano Jr., Joseph A. (1997). "The Clinical and Societal Implications of Drug Legalization". In Lowinson, Joyce; Ruiz, Pedro; Millman, Robert B.; Langrod, John B. (eds.). Substance Abuse: A Comprehensive Textbook (3rd ed.). Lippincott Williams & Wilkins. ISBN 978-0-683-18179-1.
- Nesson, Charles; Demers, John (1998). "Gatekeeping: An Enhanced Foundational Approach to Determining the Admissibility of Scientific Evidence". Hastings Law Journal. 49 (2): 335–341.

== See also ==
- List of law clerks for the ninth seat of the Supreme Court of the United States

Legal offices
| Preceded by | Deputy Assistant Attorney General for the National Security Division; 2007–2009 | Succeeded by |
| Preceded by John P. Carlin | United States Assistant Attorney General for the National Security Division; 2018–2021 | Succeeded by Mark Lesko; Acting |
| Preceded by Jeffrey A. Rosen; Acting | United States Attorney General; Acting; 2021 | Succeeded by Monty Wilkinson; Acting |
