= G. Zachary Terwilliger =

American attorney (born 1981)

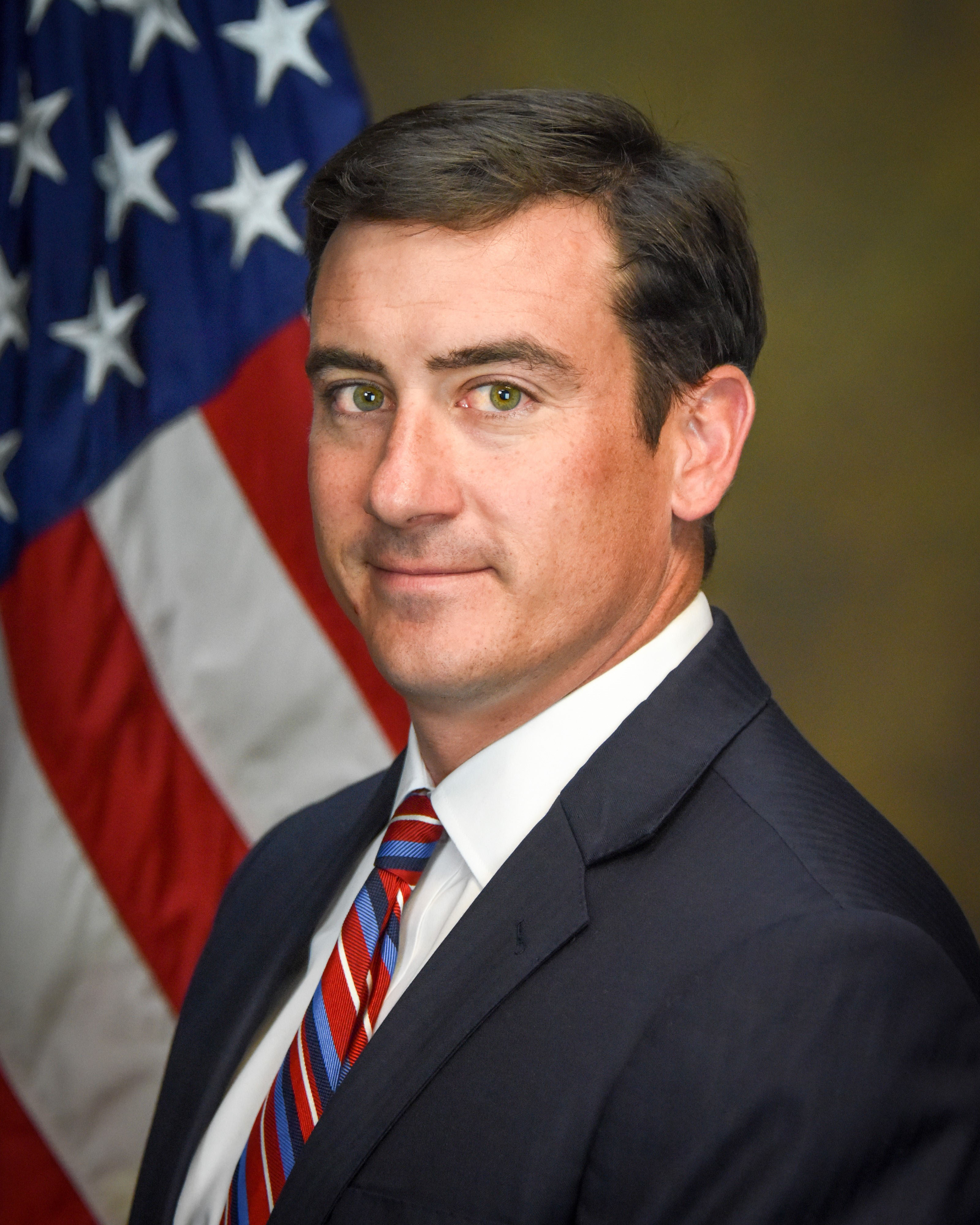

United States Attorney for the Eastern District of Virginia
- In office May 25, 2018 – January 15, 2021; Acting: May 25, 2018 – August 28, 2018
- President: Donald Trump
- Preceded by: Dana Boente
- Succeeded by: Jessica Aber

Personal details
- Born: George Zachary Terwilliger; March 22, 1981 (age 45) Washington, D.C., U.S.
- Parent: George J. Terwilliger III (father)
- Education: University of Virginia (BA); College of William and Mary (JD)

George Zachary Terwilliger (born March 22, 1981) is an American attorney who served as the United States Attorney for the Eastern District of Virginia from May 25, 2018 to January 15, 2021.

== Education ==
Terwilliger received his Bachelor of Arts degree from the University of Virginia and his juris doctor, with highest honors, from the William and Mary School of Law.

== Legal career ==
After his graduation from law school, Terwilliger served as a law clerk for Chief Judge Kevin Michael Moore of the United States District Court for the Southern District of Florida.

He previously served as an assistant United States attorney in the Eastern District of Virginia for approximately nine years, where he prosecuted organized crime, human trafficking, complex violent crime, and financial fraud offenses. He also served as leader on multiple, regional task forces as well as counselor to the U.S. attorney. During his time as an assistant United States attorney, he was detailed to the Senate Judiciary Committee where he served as a criminal counsel to Chairman Charles Grassley.

In 2021, Terwilliger joined the private sector as a partner with the law firm Vinson & Elkins.

Prior to becoming a U.S. attorney, Terwilliger served as an associate deputy attorney general in the Office of the Deputy Attorney General with responsibility for overseeing aspects of the department's Criminal Division and management of staff within the Office of Deputy Attorney General.

== United States attorney ==
On May 24, 2018, United States Attorney General Jeff Sessions named Terwilliger as the interim U.S. attorney.

Senators Tim Kaine and Mark Warner recommended Terwilliger to serve permanently as United States attorney. On July 13, 2018, President Donald Trump announced his intent to nominate Terwilliger to be the U.S. attorney for the Eastern District of Virginia. On July 17, 2018, his nomination was sent to the United States Senate. On August 23, 2018, his nomination was reported out of committee by a voice vote. On August 28, 2018, the United States Senate confirmed his nomination by a voice vote. On January 5, 2021, The United States Attorney General's Office released a statement confirming that Terwilliger would resign as the U.S. attorney for the Eastern District of Virginia effective January 15, 2021.

== Personal life ==
Terwilliger's father is George J. Terwilliger III, the former United States Deputy Attorney General under George H. W. Bush and United States Attorney for the District of Vermont under Bush and Ronald Reagan.
