= Matthew G. Olsen =

American prosecutor (born 1962)

Matt Olsen
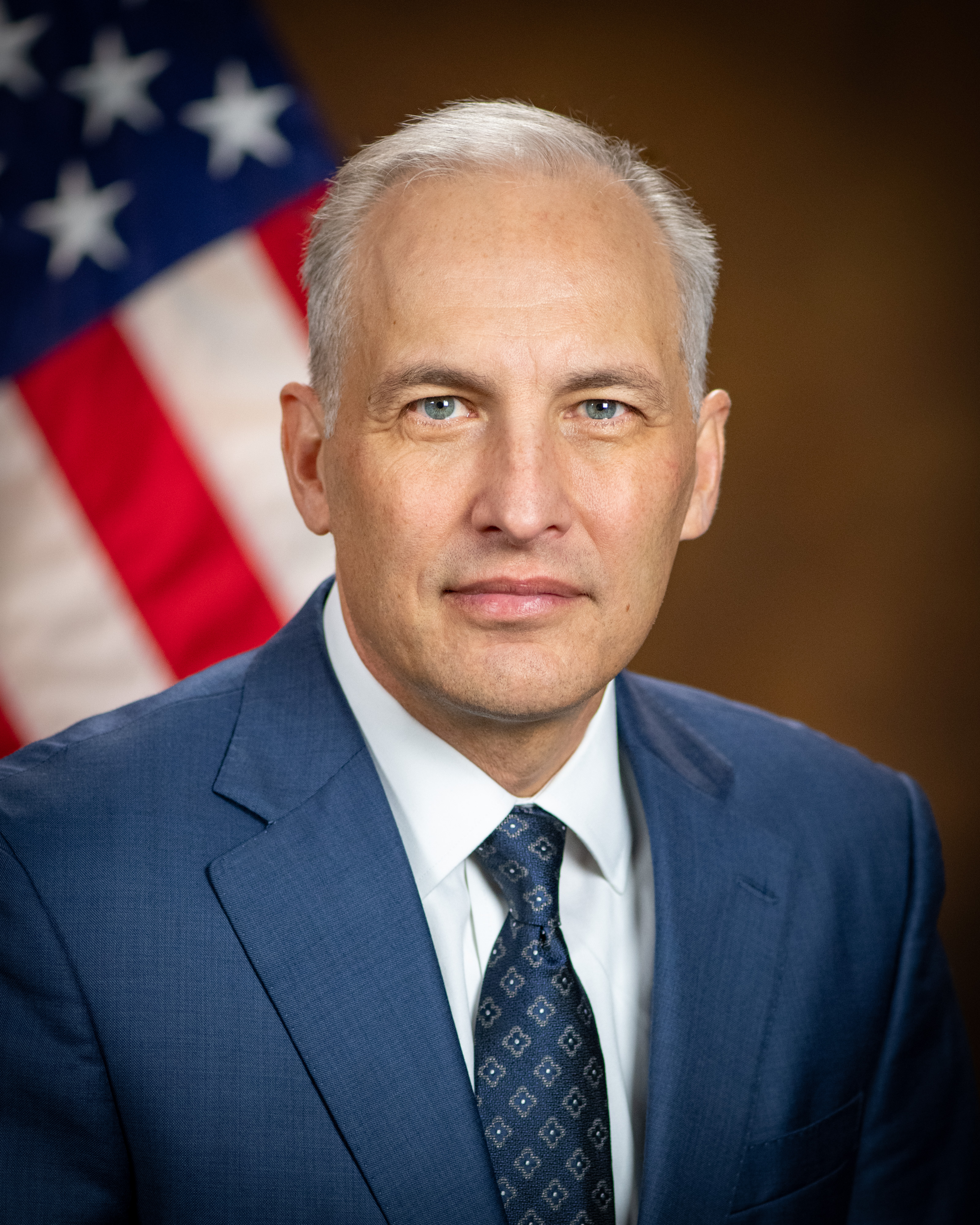
- Official portrait, 2021

United States Assistant Attorney General for the National Security Division
- In office November 1, 2021 – January 20, 2025
- President: Joe Biden
- Preceded by: John Demers
- Succeeded by: John Eisenberg

3rd Director of the National Counterterrorism Center
- In office August 16, 2011 – July 9, 2014
- President: Barack Obama
- Preceded by: Michael Leiter
- Succeeded by: Nicholas Rasmussen

Personal details
- Born: Matthew Glen Olsen; February 21, 1962 (age 64) Fargo, North Dakota, U.S.
- Party: Democratic
- Spouse: Fern Shepard
- Children: 3
- Education: University of Virginia (BA); Harvard University (JD)

Matthew Glen Olsen (born February 21, 1962) is an American attorney who served as the assistant attorney general for the National Security Division from 2021 to 2025. He is the former director of the National Counterterrorism Center.

In 2006, Olsen was appointed by President George W. Bush to be the deputy assistant attorney general in the Justice Department's National Security Division, where he served until 2009 when he became the acting director of the division. In 2009, he was appointed by Attorney General Eric Holder to become the head of the Guantanamo Review Task Force, a commission set up to oversee the legal justifications of the detainees at the Guantanamo Bay detention camp. Olsen later briefly served as associate deputy attorney general and as the general counsel of the National Security Agency.

On July 1, 2011, President Barack Obama nominated Olsen to become the director of the National Counterterrorism Center. Olsen was confirmed by the Senate on August 16, 2011. He left that post in July 2014. Olsen was once a member of the Homeland Security Advisory Council, but resigned on July 18, 2018, over immigration decisions to separate families.

== Early life, education, and law career ==
Born to Van and Myrna Olsen in Fargo, North Dakota, Olsen moved with his family to Washington D.C. when he was three years old. He has two sisters, Jennifer and Susan. His father, who died in 2008, worked as the chief of staff for North Dakota Senator Mark Andrews in the late 1960s. Olsen's grandfather immigrated from Norway and moved to North Dakota at the age of sixteen.

After graduating from high school in 1980, he attended the University of Virginia, receiving his Bachelor of Arts in 1984. He worked as a copy aide for the Washington Post before attending Harvard Law School where receiving his JD in 1988 and was an executive editor of the Civil Rights-Civil Liberties Law Review.

While away from Harvard, Olsen worked as a summer associate at the Schwalb Donnenfeld, Bray & Silbert law firm in Washington D.C in 1986. He briefly worked at McKenna, Conner & Cuneo before working as summer associate for the Sierra Club Legal Defense Fund in Juneau, Alaska in 1987. He was admitted to the Maryland Bar in 1988 and has been a member of the District of Columbia Bar since 1990. He clerked from 1988 to 1990 for Norma Holloway Johnson, who was a District Judge on the United States District Court for the District of Columbia. Olsen entered private practice as an associate for Arnold & Porter in 1991.

== Department of Justice ==
Olsen joined the United States Department of Justice in 1992, working as a trial attorney for the Department's Civil Rights Division.

He joined the United States Attorney's office for the District of Columbia in 1994, working as a federal prosecutor. In 2003, he was appointed deputy chief for the Organized Crime and Narcotics Trafficking Section within the U.S. Attorney's Office and worked as a special counsel to FBI director Robert Mueller from 2004 to 2005. In 2005, the United States Attorney for the District of Columbia, Kenneth L. Wainstein, appointed Olsen as the chief of the newly created National Security Division of the U.S. Attorney's Office, where he headed an eleven-member division that prosecuted suspected terrorists, and those who are suspected of illegal arms and human trafficking.

Olsen was appointed deputy assistant attorney general for the Justice Department's National Security Division, where he served from 2006 to 2009, and was the acting director of the division from January to March 2009. Olsen was in charge of the Justice Department's management of intelligence operations and oversight, and helped oversee the expansion of the National Security Division's Office of Intelligence Policy and Review. During his tenure, Olsen helped coordinate the intelligence community's and federal prosecutors' expanded use of intelligence from clandestine operations and warrantless surveillance in criminal cases. The actions were criticized by civil liberties advocates for threatening privacy rights, with Olsen saying that "we want to make sure that everyone knows what each other's doing," and that the Department of Justice "wants to make sure that we're taking full advantage of this very valuable information." He voiced his support and helped craft legislation for the 2008 expansion of the Foreign Intelligence Surveillance Act and was in charge of coordinating other FISA-related litigation.

In the aftermath of President Barack Obama signing Executive Order 13492, creating the Guantanamo Review Task Force to issue the closure of the Guantanamo Bay detention camp, United States Attorney General Eric Holder appointed Olsen as the executive director of the Task Force. After the task force released their final report in 2010, regarding the recommendations and evaluation of which captives to hold indefinitely and which prisoners should be transferred to their home country's, the Obama administration ultimately decided to continue the incarceration of all of the detainees at Guantanamo.

Olsen briefly served as associate deputy attorney general from March 2011 to July 2011, before leaving the Justice Department and joining the National Security Agency as the general counsel, the NSA's chief legal adviser.

Before his nomination as director of the National Counterterrorism Center, Olsen served as an adjunct professor at Georgetown University Law Center from 2001 to 2011.

=== Biden administration ===
On May 26, 2021, President Joe Biden announced Olsen as his nominee to serve as the assistant attorney general for the National Security Division; his nomination was sent to the Senate the following day. On July 14, 2021, a hearing on his nomination was held before the Senate Judiciary Committee and on July 20, 2021, a hearing was held before the Senate Select Committee on Intelligence. On August 8, 2021, his nomination was favorably reported out of the Judiciary Committee and on August 10, his nomination was favorably reported out of the Intelligence Committee. On October 28, 2021, his nomination was confirmed in Senate by a 53–45 vote. He was sworn into office on November 1, 2021.

==== Tenure ====
On January 11, 2022, Olsen was invited to testify before the Senate Judiciary Committee about the threat of domestic terrorism one year after the January 6 Capitol attack. During this Senate hearing, he announced the creation of a new unit to help investigate and prosecute cases of domestic terrorism.

== National Counterterrorism Center ==
On July 1, 2011, President Barack Obama nominated Olsen to replace Michael Leiter as director of the National Counterterrorism Center. He was cleared by the Senate Intelligence Committee on August 1, 2011, following confirmation in a voice vote by the United States Senate on August 2, 2011. The Counterterrorism Center is a part of the Office of the Director of National Intelligence and was created in the aftermath of the 9/11 Terrorist Attacks to provide terrorism information to the intelligence community. After leaving the government the subject has worked for IronNet Cybersecurity, Inc.

== Other service ==
In November 2020, Olsen was named a volunteer member of the Joe Biden presidential transition agency review team to support transition efforts related to the United States Intelligence Community.

He served on the board of directors of Human Rights First and previously served on the Advisory Board of the National Security institute.

== Personal life ==
Olsen lives with his wife Fern in Kensington, Maryland. She is a lawyer and serves on the board of trustees for the non-profit public interest law firm Earthjustice. Olsen and his wife have three children.

Political offices
Preceded by Michael Leiter	Director of the National Counterterrorism Center; 2011–2014	Succeeded by Nicholas Rasmussen
Preceded by John Demers	United States Assistant Attorney General for the National Security Division; 2021–2025	Succeeded by John Eisenberg
