= John P. Carlin =

American attorney (born 1973)

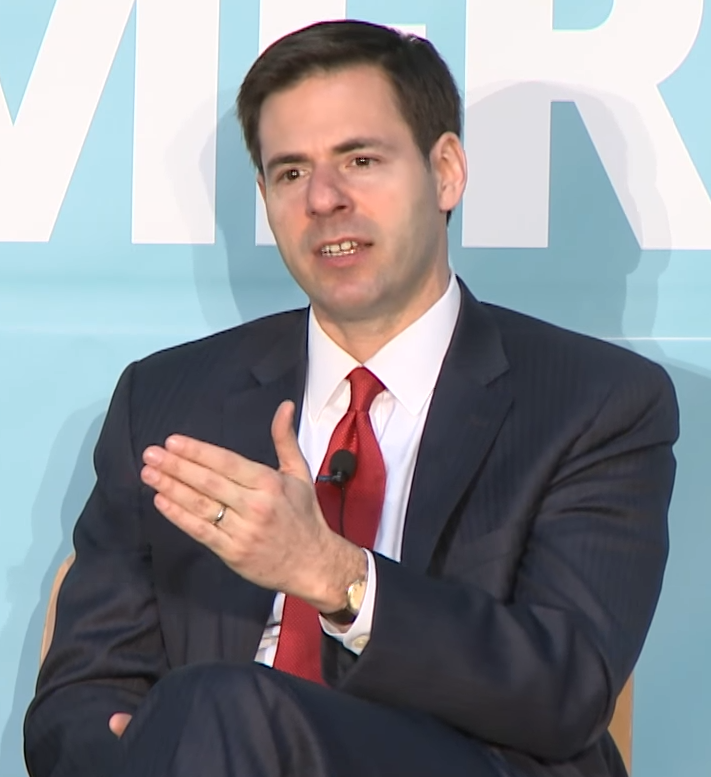
- Carlin in 2015

Principal Associate Deputy Attorney General
- In office January 20, 2021 – September 2022
- President: Joe Biden
- Preceded by: Richard Donoghue
- Succeeded by: Marshall Miller

United States Deputy Attorney General
- Acting
- In office January 20, 2021 – April 21, 2021
- President: Joe Biden
- Preceded by: Richard Donoghue (acting)
- Succeeded by: Lisa Monaco

United States Assistant Attorney General for the National Security Division
- In office April 1, 2014 – October 15, 2016
- President: Barack Obama
- Preceded by: Lisa Monaco
- Succeeded by: John Demers

Personal details
- Born: John Philip Carlin; 1973 (age 52–53) New York City, U.S.
- Party: Democratic
- Education: Williams College (BA); Harvard University (JD)

John Philip Carlin (born 1973) is an American attorney who served as acting deputy attorney general in the United States Department of Justice from January to April 2021. From April 2021 to September 2022, Carlin was principal associate deputy attorney general under Deputy Attorney General Lisa Monaco. He previously served as United States assistant attorney general for the National Security Division from April 2014 to October 15, 2016, and as chief of staff to Robert Mueller during his time as director of the Federal Bureau of Investigation.

== Early life and education ==
Carlin was born in 1973 in New York City. He earned a Bachelor of Arts degree from Williams College and a Juris Doctor from Harvard Law School. While at Harvard, Carlin was the articles editor of the Harvard Journal on Legislation.

== Career ==
Carlin joined the United States Department of Justice through the Attorney General’s Honors Program. Carlin chairs the Aspen Institute’s Cybersecurity and Technology policy program, and was a Fellow at the Belfer Center for Science and International Affairs. Carlin was a partner at Morrison & Foerster until January 20, 2021, when he was appointed by President Joe Biden to serve as acting deputy attorney general. Following his departure from the DOJ, Carlin returned to private practice at Paul, Weiss in October 2022 as co-head of its cybersecurity and data protection practice.

Carlin has been featured in The New York Times, Vanity Fair, The Washington Post, The Wall Street Journal, the Los Angeles Times, and USA Today. He has appeared on 60 Minutes, Meet the Press, Charlie Rose, NPR, and CNN.

== See also ==
- Foreign interference in the 2020 United States elections

== Publications ==
- Carlin, John P.; Graff, Garrett M (2018). Dawn of the code war : America's battle against Russia, China, and the rising global cyber threat (First ed.). New York, NY: PublicAffairs. ISBN 978-1541773837. OCLC 1041249829.

Legal offices
Preceded by Lisa Monaco	United States Assistant Attorney General for the National Security Division; 2014–2016	Succeeded by John Demers
Preceded by Richard Donoghue; Acting	United States Deputy Attorney General; Acting; 2021	Succeeded by Lisa Monaco
Preceded by Richard Donoghue	Principal Associate Deputy Attorney General; 2021–2022	Succeeded by Marshall Miller
