= United States Department of Justice National Security Division =

National security division

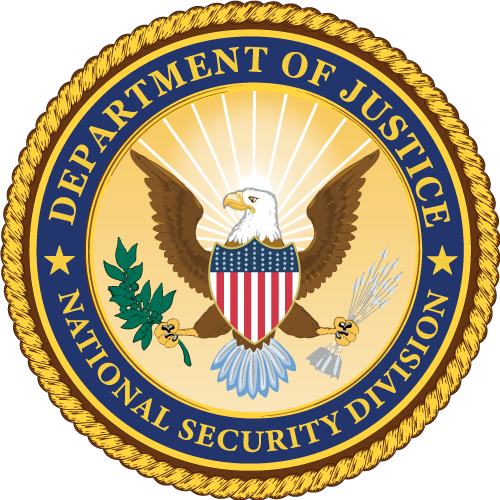
- Seal of the United States Department of Justice National Security Division

Division overview
- Formed: March 9, 2006; 20 years ago
- Jurisdiction: United States government agency
- Headquarters: Robert F. Kennedy Department of Justice Building 950 Pennsylvania Avenue NW Washington, D.C., United States
- Division executive: John Eisenberg, Assistant Attorney General
- Parent department: U.S. Department of Justice
- Website: justice.gov/nsd

The United States Department of Justice National Security Division (NSD) handles national security functions of the United States Department of Justice. Created by the 2005 USA PATRIOT Act reauthorization, the division consolidated all of the department's national security and intelligence functions into a single division. The division is headed by the assistant attorney general for national security.

== History ==
The National Security Division was created under Section 506 of the 2005 USA PATRIOT Act reauthorization, which was signed into law by President George W. Bush on March 9, 2006.

It consolidated the department's national security efforts within one unit, bringing together attorneys from the Counterterrorism Section and Counterespionage Section of the Criminal Division and from the Office of Intelligence Policy and Review (OIPR), with their specialized expertise in the Foreign Intelligence Surveillance Act and other intelligence matters. This fulfilled a recommendation of the Iraq Intelligence Commission (Commission on the Intelligence Capabilities of the United States Regarding Weapons of Mass Destruction).

In 2010, its budget was $88 million.

== Office of the Assistant Attorney for National Security ==
The head of the National Security Division is an assistant attorney general for national security (AAG-NS) appointed by the president of the United States. Matthew G. Olsen, the most recent AAG-NS, was confirmed to the role with the advice and consent of the Senate. Previously, John Demers, the AAG-NS appointed under President Donald Trump, continued to serve under the Biden administration, but he left the role in June 2021 in the wake of news reports that the Justice officials had seized the phone records of congressional members and staff.

== Organization ==
The National Security Division is overseen by the assistant attorney general with whom the principal deputy assistant attorney general oversees the Executive Office - The office that administers the entire division. In assistance are four deputy assistant attorneys general, all career civil servants, whom oversee each section.

- Counterintelligence and Export Control Section - Responsible for supervising investigations and prosecutions relating to espionage, or trafficking of national security information and military hardware.
- Counterterrorism Section - Responsible for supporting Law Enforcement efforts, policy and strategy in combatting international and domestic terrorism.
- Foreign Investment and Review Section - Responsible for investigating and mitigating foreign investment in critical U.S. infrastructure and commerce.
- Office of Law and Policy - Responsible for developing national security policies and strategies within the Justice Department.
- Office of Intelligence - Responsible for legal and regulatory oversight of the U.S. Intelligence Community. The office contains three sections
  - Operations Section - Responsible for pursuing legal authorization of U.S. Intelligence Operations and representing the government in a FISA Court.
  - Oversight Section - Responsible for oversight of the Intelligence Community and ensuring full legal compliance and protection of individual privacy and civil liberties.
  - Litigation Section - Responsible for handling information gathered from FISA-related activities and preparation of the information for litigation.
- Office of Justice for Victims of Overseas Terrorism - Responsible for working with terrorism victims and their families to pursue and prosecute the culprits.

DoJ National Security Division Organizational Breakdown

Assistant Attorney General for National Security
Executive Office	Principal Deputy Assistant Attorney General and Chief of Staff
Deputy Assistant Attorney General for Counter-Espionage	Deputy Assistant Attorney General for Counter-Terrorism	Deputy Assistant Attorney General for Intelligence	Deputy Assistant Attorney General for Law and Policy
Foreign Investment Review Section	Counter-Terrorism Section	Office of Intelligence	Office of Law and Policy
Counterintelligence and Export Control Section	Office of Justice for Victims of Overseas Terrorism	Operations Section
Oversight Section
Litigation Section

== Controversies ==
In December 2019, Michael Horowitz, the inspector general of the DoJ released a report accusing the division of lying to the Foreign Intelligence Surveillance Court in some of its applications for wiretaps. The presiding judge of the court subsequently ordered the division to "inform the Court in a sworn written submission of what it has done, and plans to do, to ensure that the statement of facts in each FBI application accurately and completely reflects information possessed by the FBI that is material to any issue presented by the application."

Starting in 2025, the division oversaw the redactions of the investigative files related to accused sex-trafficker Jeffrey Epstein. The effort was criticized by victims of Epstein who claimed their names and personal information were not properly redacted and made public. Representatives in Congress also accused the DOJ of improperly redacting information about possible Epstein co-conspirators.

== List of assistant attorneys general ==
Name	President nominating	Sworn in	Left office
Kenneth Leonard Wainstein	George W. Bush	September 28, 2006	March 30, 2008
J. Patrick Rowan	George W. Bush	October 3, 2008	January 20, 2009
David S. Kris	Barack Obama	March 26, 2009	January 13, 2011
Lisa Monaco	Barack Obama	July 1, 2011	March 8, 2013
John P. Carlin	Barack Obama	April 1, 2014	October 15, 2016
John Demers	Donald Trump	February 22, 2018	June 25, 2021
John Demers	Joe Biden	February 22, 2018	June 25, 2021
Mark Lesko (acting)	Joe Biden	June 25, 2021	November 1, 2021
Matthew G. Olsen	Joe Biden	November 1, 2021	January 20, 2025
John Eisenberg	Donald Trump	June 5, 2025	November 6, 2026

== See also ==
- FBI National Security Branch
