= Joe Biden classified documents incident =

2022–2024 political incident

- Date: November 2022 – February 2024
- Location: Penn Biden Center for Diplomacy and Global Engagement (Washington, D.C.); Joe Biden's personal residence (Wilmington, Delaware); University of Delaware
- Cause: Discovery of classified documents from the Senate tenure and vice presidency of Joe Biden in his possession
- Outcome: No charges filed
- Inquiries: Initial Department of Justice investigation led by U.S. Attorney John R. Lausch Jr. (November 14, 2022 – January 12, 2023); Department of Justice special counsel investigation led by Robert K. Hur (January 12, 2023 – February 8, 2024); House Judiciary Committee investigation (January 13, 2023 – present)

On January 9, 2023, CBS News reported that attorneys for U.S. president Joe Biden discovered classified government documents in his former office at the Penn Biden Center in Washington, D.C., and in his personal residence in Wilmington, Delaware, dating to his time in the United States Senate and his vice presidency in the Obama administration. The number of documents was later revealed to be between 25 and 30. By June 2023, classified documents from Biden's Senate tenure were discovered in materials donated to the University of Delaware.

On November 2, 2022, Biden's attorneys discovered the first set of classified documents in a locked closet at the Penn Biden Center; they reported them that day to the National Archives and Records Administration (NARA), which retrieved them the next day. The classified documents included intelligence material and briefing memos on Ukraine, Iran and the United Kingdom. In coordination with the Justice Department (DOJ), Biden's attorneys discovered a second set of documents at Biden's home on December 20, followed by several more on January 9 and January 12, 2023. Biden's personal attorney said on January 21 that the Justice Department discovered six items containing classification markings during a consensual search of his home the previous day, some of which dated to his tenure in the Senate; investigators also seized some of Biden's handwritten notes from his vice presidency. On November 14, 2022, Attorney General Merrick Garland assigned U.S. Attorney John R. Lausch Jr. to conduct an initial investigation. On January 12, 2023, Garland appointed Robert K. Hur as special counsel to investigate "possible unauthorized removal and retention of classified documents or other records". The next day, the House Judiciary Committee opened a separate investigation into the documents.

On February 8, 2024, the Justice Department released the report by special counsel Hur, which concluded that the "evidence does not establish Mr. Biden's guilt beyond a reasonable doubt", so "no criminal charges are warranted in this matter". For classified documents found in the Penn Biden Center and in the University of Delaware, Hur judged that they "could plausibly have been brought to these locations by mistake". For Afghanistan-related classified documents found in the garage of Biden's Delaware home, Hur stated that his investigation could not determine "why, how, or by whom" that material was kept. For Biden's handwritten notebooks found in Biden's Delaware home, which included classified content, Hur credited the possibility that Biden treated them as "personal property", given "historical practice" of the federal government allowing President Ronald Reagan to take home his diaries as "personal records" despite their classified content. While Hur found that Biden read out classified information from his notebooks to his ghostwriter, Hur judged that it was not proven that Biden knew that the information was classified. Hur also surmised that in a trial, "Biden would likely present himself to a jury ... as a sympathetic, well-meaning, elderly man with a poor memory" with "diminished faculties in advancing age".

The report's comments on Biden's memory have sparked substantial political controversy, with The New York Times, The Washington Post, and New York magazine describing them as overshadowing the report's conclusion against charging Biden. During a press conference later that day, Biden criticized Hur's report for negatively assessing his mental state, describing it as "extraneous commentary", and stated "my memory's fine". Biden criticized Hur for questioning him about the timing of his son Beau's death, suggesting it was unnecessary. However, the transcript of Biden's interview showed that it was Biden himself that brought up Beau Biden's death in his testimony, failing to correctly remember the year. Additionally, Biden failed to remember when he was vice president. The DOJ defended the report against criticism over inclusion of comments on Biden's memory, stating that the report and its public release fell well within DOJ guidelines.

In May 2024, Biden would invoke executive privilege to keep a recording of the Hur interview classified. On June 12, 2024, Garland, who enforced Biden's executive privilege decision to keep the audio of President Biden's interview with Hur classified and would not turn it over to Congress, would be found in contempt of Congress; despite the fact that the audio recording of the Hur interview was not turned over to Congress, the transcript of the Hur interview had already been turned over.

== Background ==
CNN reported that the process to return Biden's documents to NARA began many weeks before his vice presidency ended, but was made more difficult by the fact that Biden continued to use his vice presidential offices and continued to receive more classified documents. CNN, quoting "former aides and others with direct knowledge of the process", reported that most of the actual packing of Biden's belongings and documents was done by lower-level staffers, though the staff had "clear Presidential Records Act guidelines" and took those guidelines seriously. The documents "not deemed covered by the records requirements to submit to the National Archives" were stored at a temporary facility run by the General Services Administration near the White House before eventually being moved to the Penn Biden Center.

== Discoveries and other developments ==
=== First batch of documents ===
On November 2, 2022, Joe Biden's personal attorneys found classified documents dating to his vice presidency, some of which were top secret sensitive compartmented information, in a locked closet while packing files at the Penn Biden Center for Diplomacy and Global Engagement, a think tank where Biden worked after leaving the government in 2017. The White House notified NARA on the same day of the discovery; NARA retrieved the documents the next day and notified its inspector general, who referred the matter to the DOJ on November 4. The FBI and DOJ initiated an assessment of whether classified materials had been mishandled on November 9, notifying Biden's personal attorneys the next day.

=== DOJ letter to Bob Bauer ===
The Washington Post reported in January 2023 that a senior DOJ national security division official wrote to Biden's personal attorney Bob Bauer in mid-November, asking the Biden legal team to secure the documents found at Penn Biden Center and refrain from further reviewing them, or other documents that might be in other locations. The letter also requested formal permission to examine the Penn Biden materials, and asked for a list of other locations where documents might be stored. The letter implied that the DOJ would take the lead in the inquiry; this allowed Biden's team to approach the situation with caution and deference to the DOJ, only acting in coordination with federal investigators in the hope that the matter would be quickly resolved. The resulting lack of transparency in public communications led to perceptions by some in the media that the Biden team was obfuscating details.

=== Second batch of documents ===
On December 20, a second batch of classified documents was discovered by Biden's attorneys in the garage of his home in Wilmington, Delaware. On January 11, 2023, a one-page classified document was also found in a room adjacent to the garage, described as Biden's private library. This discovery was made and reported by Biden's personal attorneys, who immediately stopped searching that room because they did not have security clearances. On January 12, five more one-page classified documents were recovered from the library by the White House attorney and DOJ representatives who had gone there to collect them. None of these documents were classified as top secret. CBS News reported on January 13 that a total of about 20 documents were found at the Penn Biden Center and Biden's home in Wilmington.

The finding of the second batch of classified documents at Biden's residence was not initially disclosed to the public when the White House made its initial disclosure on January 9. White House Press Secretary Karine Jean-Pierre defended the communication, saying the search of the second batch "was still ongoing" at that time of the initial statements and "after the search concluded ... we released a statement disclosing the facts from that search". She later stated that the DOJ inquiry prevented the administration from disclosing the matter to the public.

=== FBI search of Biden's Wilmington home ===
On January 20 the FBI conducted a 13-hour search of the entire premises of Biden's Wilmington home. The next day his personal attorney Bob Bauer revealed the search, saying that the agents had examined "personally handwritten notes, files, papers, binders, memorabilia, to-do lists, schedules, and reminders going back decades". They identified and removed six documents containing classified markings from Biden's home office, some from his time in the Senate and some from his vice presidency. They also took possession of some of his notes. Biden and his wife were at their home in Rehoboth Beach, Delaware, at the time. CNN reported the search was conducted with the consent of Biden's attorneys, so a subpoena or search warrant was not required.

=== Other searches ===
On February 1 the FBI searched Biden's home in Rehoboth Beach. According to Biden's attorney, the FBI found no classified documents, but took papers and notes from his time as vice president.

On February 16, it was reported that the FBI had carried out a search at the University of Delaware, which kept over 1,800 boxes of documents donated by Biden. The search did not initially turn up any classified information, but the material is still being reviewed, reported The Washington Post citing an unnamed source. By June 2023, FBI "agents found documents with potential classification markings, dating from 1977 to 1991, during Mr. Biden's service in the Senate" from the material stored in the University of Delaware, stated special counsel Robert Hur's report in February 2024.

== Initial responses ==
=== Biden and his legal team ===
Biden stated that he was "surprised" when he learned of the documents found at Penn Biden Center. The White House also stated that Biden does not know what is in the documents. He added that he would cooperate fully with the investigation. Biden's legal team has denied any wrongdoing, stating that the documents were "inadvertently misplaced".

In response to the discovery of a second set of classified documents at Biden's Wilmington home, Biden acknowledged his possession of the documents, stating "I'm going to get the chance to speak on all of this, God willing it'll be soon, but I said earlier this week – and by the way my Corvette is in a locked garage. It's not like it's sitting out in the street."

Biden and his advisors did not disclose the discovery of the documents to the public for 68 days. According to The New York Times, Biden's team hoped that they could convince the Justice Department it was a good-faith mistake and resolve the matter before it could impact the image of Biden or his presidency. According to The Times, this strategy has appeared to have "backfired" and left Biden open to criticism.

=== Elected officials ===
==== Republican elected officials ====
House Republicans compared the incident to former president Donald Trump's retention of documents. Then-House Speaker Kevin McCarthy (R-CA) stated that Congress should investigate the Biden matter and launch its own probe.

Mike Turner (R-OH), incoming chair of the House Intelligence Committee, asked for a national security damage assessment regarding the Biden documents. Jim Jordan (R-OH), incoming chair of the House Judiciary Committee, launched an investigation and wrote to Garland requesting information and documents. Representatives James Comer (R-KY), Ken Buck (R-CO), and Elise Stefanik (R-NY and chair of the House Republican Conference) demanded that Biden release a visitor log of his home, though such logs are not kept for presidents' personal homes.

==== Democratic elected officials ====
Democratic officials exhibited a mixed response to the incident, with some accusing the Republicans of hypocrisy, others suggested a congressional review of the materials, due to national security concerns. Democrats in the former group argued that the same Republican officials had defended Trump's possession and retention of many more documents over a period of years, while Biden's team had immediately notified NARA of the discovery and turned over the documents.

Senator Ben Cardin (D-MD) said the Republicans are creating a "false equivalency" because "one person (Biden) handled it right, the other person (Trump) handled it wrong." Representative Hank Johnson (D-GA) baselessly suggested the classified documents were planted to embarrass Biden. Representative Adam Schiff (D-CA) stated that the situation with Biden is different from the situation with Trump. Schiff also said the handling of the documents may have compromised national security. Senator Debbie Stabenow (D-MI) called Biden's previous comments in 2022 on Trump's document possession "embarrassing", given the current incident.

=== Media analysis ===
Multiple media outlets such as BBC News, CNN, and The New York Times reported significant differences between the Biden incident and the ongoing FBI investigation into Donald Trump's handling of government documents. In Biden's case, the documents were not the subject of a request or inquiry by NARA; Biden notified NARA upon discovery, and Biden returned the documents the next day. In Trump's case, NARA realized notable documents from his administration were missing; they requested the documents from Trump, but Trump did not return all the documents, even following a subpoena and ultimately the FBI search of Mar-a-Lago. The New York Times also noted that Trump mishandled hundreds of documents, while Biden only mishandled a comparatively small number of them. The Washington Post said the incident "is likely to rob him of the unvarnished ability" to criticize Trump for his document scandal.

=== Misinformation ===
On January 12, 2023, an anonymous Twitter account posted a rental application found on Hunter Biden's laptop, falsely claiming that in 2018, Biden had paid $49,910 in monthly rent for his father's Delaware residence where the documents were found. On January 14, Miranda Devine of the New York Post tweeted the same application. A day later, a Breitbart reporter falsely claimed that Hunter had been living at the residence in 2018 and may have had access to classified documents. His post was retweeted by House Republican Conference chair Elise Stefanik who added that "Joe Biden and the Biden Crime Family are corrupt and significant threats to national security. Our Republican House Majority will hold them accountable." James Comer, chair of the House Oversight Committee that is investigating the Biden family, suggested it was evidence that Hunter Biden may have been funneling foreign money to his father. In the following days, the allegations were promoted by The Daily Caller and by Tucker Carlson, Sean Hannity, and other Fox News personalities. The document actually showed quarterly rental payments for office space at the House of Sweden in Washington, D.C.

=== Discovery of classified documents at Mike Pence's residence ===
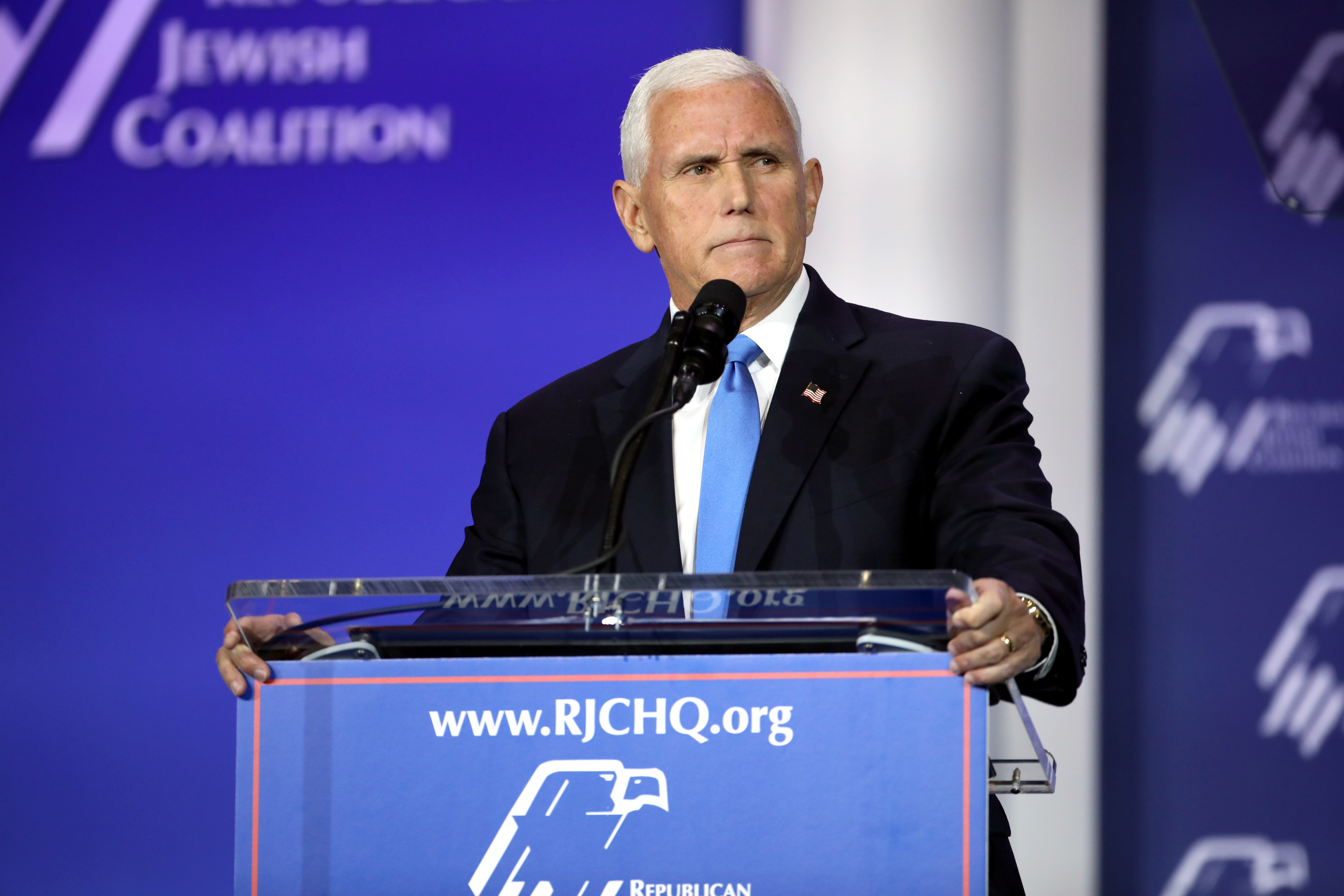
Pence speaking in Las Vegas in October 2023

On January 24, 2023, it was reported that former vice president Mike Pence's attorney had notified the Department of Justice that documents marked classified had been found at Pence's Indiana residence. Pence's attorney's letter said he had hired "outside counsel with experience in handling classified documents" to review records kept at his residence, following the revelations regarding classified documents being found at Biden's residence. The letter said that these documents appeared to have been "inadvertently boxed and transported to the personal home of the former vice president at the end of the last administration".

In June 2023, days before Mike Pence's announcement as a candidate in the 2024 United States presidential election, the FBI announced that no charges would be brought against the former vice president.

== Investigations ==
After the discovery of the first batch of documents, on November 14, 2022, Attorney General Merrick Garland assigned U.S. Attorney John R. Lausch Jr. to conduct an initial investigation.

=== Special counsel ===
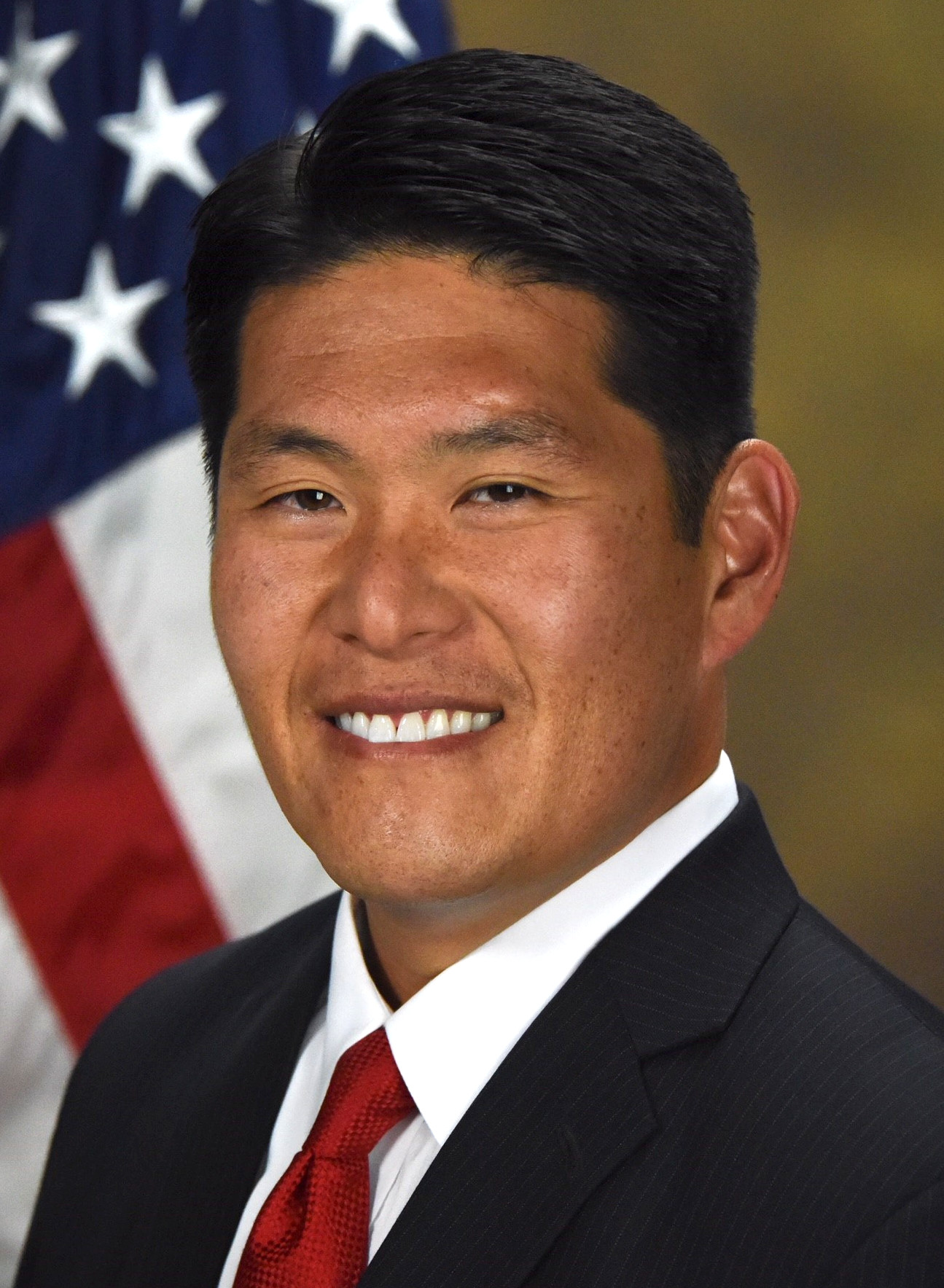
Robert K Hur was appointed as special counsel to oversee the investigation by Attorney General Merrick Garland on January 12, 2023.

On January 5, 2023, Lausch advised Garland that a special counsel was warranted. On January 12, Garland announced that he was appointing a special counsel to investigate "possible unauthorized removal and retention of classified documents or other records". He named Robert K. Hur to oversee the investigation. Hur's investigation examined "the possible unauthorized removal and retention of classified documents or other records discovered" at Biden's think tank in Washington and at his home.

The Wall Street Journal reported the DOJ and Biden's attorneys agreed the FBI would not be present as the attorneys inspected the president's properties for documents. The Journal said the DOJ found the Biden team was cooperating and was anticipating an investigation that might extend well into 2024.

NBC News reported on August 11, 2023, that investigators had been negotiating with Biden attorneys for about a month to arrange an interview with the president. Biden was voluntarily interviewed by investigators for five hours on October 8 and 9. Around 100 current and former officials who worked with Biden were also interviewed. The special counsel conducted 173 interviews of 147 witnesses in total. Alongside Biden's notebooks, investigators took 90 documents from Biden's office and home, about 50 of which had classification markings.

==== Decision that charges were unwarranted ====
On February 8, 2024, the Justice Department released Hur's report on the result of his investigation; Hur decided that "no criminal charges are warranted in this matter ... even if there was no policy against charging a sitting president", because the "evidence does not establish Mr. Biden's guilt beyond a reasonable doubt." According to Hur, his "investigation uncovered evidence that President Biden willfully retained and disclosed classified materials after his vice presidency when he was a private citizen", but concluded neither Biden nor his staff broke the law in handling classified materials.

Full report by Hur, February 2024

Regarding Biden's handwritten notebooks, which included classified content and were found in Biden's Delaware home's office and basement, Hur concluded that there was a possibility that Biden "thought his notebooks were his personal property and he was allowed to take them home, even if they contained classified information", and that "enough evidence supports this defense to establish reasonable doubt." Biden cited the past example of President Ronald Reagan acting similarly, with Hur affirming this "historical practice": Reagan had taken home his diaries which contained classified material, with the federal government allowing him to do so while labeling the diaries as "personal records".

Hur's investigation further found that Biden had read out classified information "nearly verbatim" from his notebooks to his ghostwriter "on at least three occasions", but Hur judged that these actions could be viewed as "unintentional"; the "evidence does not show that when Mr. Biden shared the specific passages with his ghostwriter, Mr. Biden knew the passages were classified and intended to share classified information." The ghostwriter, Mark Zwonitzer, did not hold a security clearance, and Biden knew this, wrote Hur. On some occasions, "Biden took steps to ensure that Zwonitzer did not read or have access to the classified portions of the notebooks"; Biden at times skipped potentially classified material when narrating his notebooks, and he did not allow Zwonitzer to "read or handle the notebooks" with one exception, detailed Hur. In the instance that Biden let Zwonitzer read the notebook, Biden said: "some of this may be classified, so be careful ... I'm not sure. It isn't marked classified, but." As Biden was "not sure", Hur judged that this was "enough to create reasonable doubt" on whether Biden had disclosed classified information "willfully".

Regarding classified material located in Biden's Delaware garage, relating to a 2009 Afghanistan troop surge, Hur stated that there was a "shortage of evidence" proving that Biden willfully and knowingly kept such material, as the investigation could not determine "why, how, or by whom" that material was kept. Hur determined that there were several defenses "likely to create reasonable doubt" into Biden's guilt, including a defense of forgetting about the materials, with the manner of storage of the material in the garage being evidence that suggested that Biden may have forgotten the materials in "an innocent mistake, rather than acting willfully – that is, with intent to break the law". In addition, Hur noted that the Afghanistan material may no longer be "sensitive" due to several reasons: the documents were fourteen years old, the American war in Afghanistan was over with the American military being no longer in Afghanistan, and the troop surge was already "widely discussed in books and media reports".

As for other classified material found in either Biden's Delaware home, in the University of Delaware, or in the Penn Biden Center in Washington, D.C., "the decision to decline criminal charges was straightforward", stated Hur, as the "evidence suggests that Mr. Biden did not willfully retain these documents and that they could plausibly have been brought to these locations by mistake". There was no evidence that Biden had seen the classified material in the University of Delaware or in the Penn Biden Center in Washington, D.C.; the material may have been mistakenly left there by Biden's staff, indicated Hur.

Hur cited Biden's cooperation with the investigation and drew several sharp distinctions between Biden and Trump, who is facing a similar probe over classified documents. Hur stated that Biden had returned the documents and cooperated voluntarily with the probe from its beginning, whereas Trump declined multiple opportunities to return documents in his possession and allegedly sought to destroy evidence.

The report details that Biden's ghostwriter, Mark Zwonitzer, deleted some recordings of his interactions with Biden, after learning of the federal probe into classified documents, but before investigators contacted him to ask for them. Zwonitzer admitted deleting the recordings to protect Biden's privacy; Zwonitzer also said that he did not believe that there was classified information in them or that he would be investigated in the probe, the report stated. Zwonitzer did pass to investigators transcripts of the recordings, some remaining recordings of his interactions with Biden, and his electronic devices, which allowed investigators to recover most of the deleted recordings. Hur ultimately chose not to charge Zwonitzer, citing "plausible, innocent reasons" for deletion of recordings and Zwonitzer's cooperation, such that there was not enough evidence to sufficiently prove that Zwonitzer "intended to impede an investigation". The report noted that Biden's 2017 memoir ultimately did not contain classified information.

Andrew Weissmann and Ryan Goodman wrote that the press had significantly misinterpreted Hur's findings, in part due to how Hur phrased them on the first page of his report: "Our investigation uncovered evidence that President Biden willfully retained and disclosed classified materials after his vice presidency when he was a private citizen." Goodman and Weissmann asserted, "You have to wait for the later statements that what the report actually says is there is insufficient evidence of criminality, innocent explanations for the conduct, and affirmative evidence that Biden did not willfully withhold classified documents."

Biden said that he was pleased with the report's recommendation against criminal charges and the distinctions it made between his case and Trump's handling of classified information. Biden also falsely denied sharing classified information with Zwonitzer.

==== Comments on Biden's memory ====
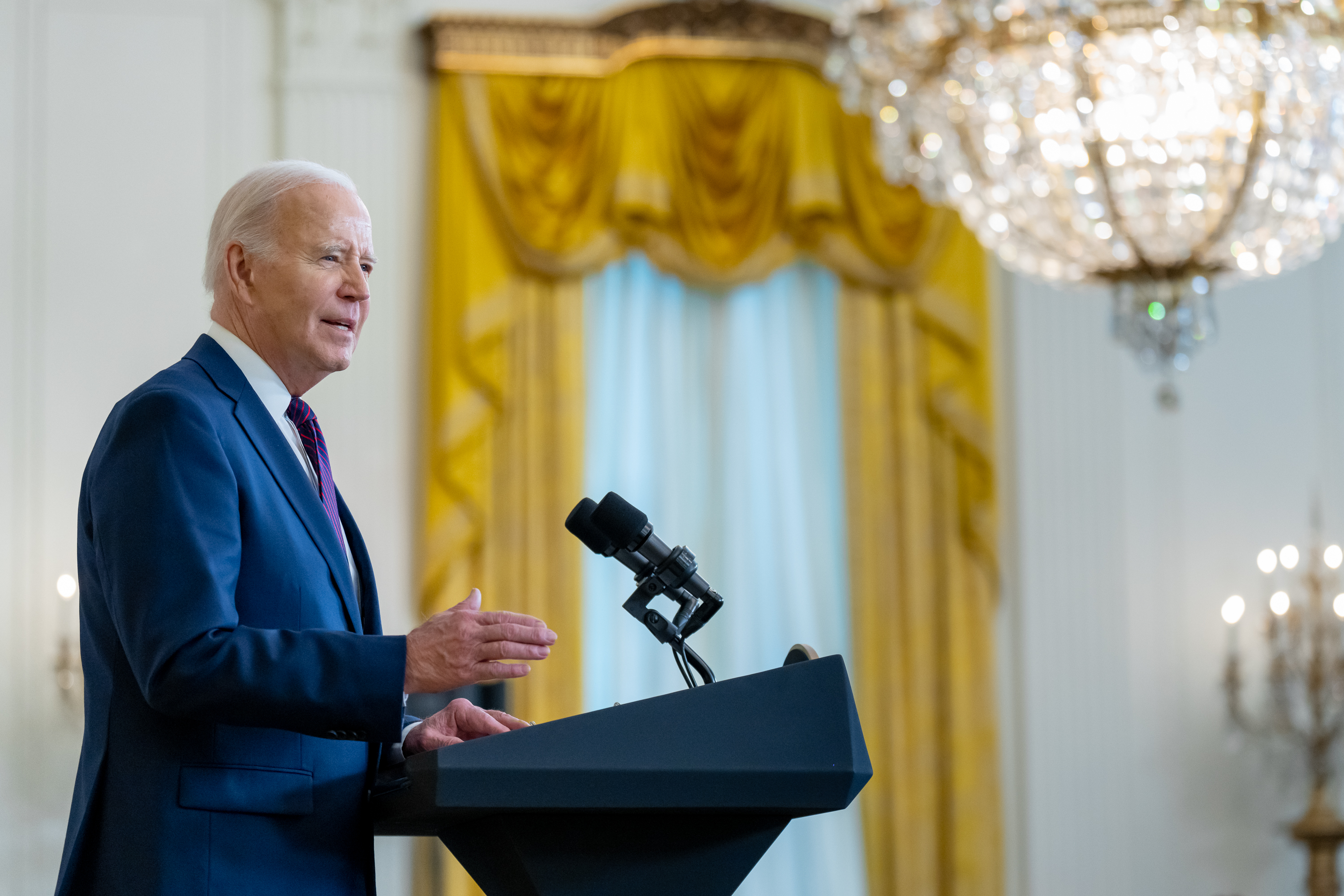
Biden speaking at the White House in January 2024

As part of the decision not to pursue charges, Hur noted "we have also considered that, at trial, Mr. Biden would likely present himself to a jury, as he did during our interview of him, as a sympathetic, well-meaning, elderly man with a poor memory". The special counsel's report noted two particular incidents where Biden's memory was described as "significantly limited", during a recorded conversation with a ghostwriter in 2017 and an interview with investigators in 2023, describing Biden's memory as being "worse" in the latter interview. The report noted that Biden struggled to recall defining personal milestones in his life, such as the death of his son and when he took office as Vice President. The transcript of Biden's interview with the special counsel confirmed Biden demonstrating repeated lapses, regarding details of how classified information was handled, years of significant events in his life, and several other missteps unreported in the special counsel report. It also showed Biden being clearheaded for most of the interview and capable of providing detailed descriptions of other prior events.

Concerns about Biden's age, memory, and mental acuity have been raised throughout Biden's term as president, especially heading into the 2024 presidential election. CNN, NBC, and The Guardian have described concerns regarding Biden's age and memory as his greatest political vulnerability. An NBC News poll conducted shortly before the release of Hur's report found that 76% of voters expressed major or moderate concerns about Biden's mental and physical health. The report's negative portrayal of Biden's memory added to that political controversy, with The New York Times, The Washington Post, and New York Magazine stating that it overshadowed the report's conclusion on not charging Biden. Shortly after the report's publication, Republican politicians utilized the report's statements on mental acuity to question Biden's fitness for re-election. Hur's report has been compared to FBI director James Comey's investigation into the Hillary Clinton email controversy, in which Comey's criticism of Clinton's conduct potentially damaged her 2016 presidential campaign, despite not recommending charges.

The White House was allowed an executive privilege review of Hur's report prior to its public release, but did not request any redactions, though the White House counsel asked Hur to revise "inflammatory" language describing problems with Biden's memory. The appendix of the report included a letter from Biden attorneys addressing Hur's references to Biden's age and "poor memory," which the attorneys characterized as pejorative and "highly prejudicial language" that "is not supported by the facts, nor is it appropriately used by a federal prosecutor in this context." Biden's personal attorney said the inclusion of the content was contrary to Justice Department "regulations and norms" and reminiscent of FBI director James Comey's criticisms of Hillary Clinton during the 2016 presidential campaign. During a press conference later that day, Biden criticized Hur's report for negatively assessing his mental state, describing it as "extraneous commentary", and stated "my memory's fine." In response to the results of the investigation, Vice President Kamala Harris criticized the report, calling it "gratuitous" and "politically motivated", and questioned Hur's integrity. Representative Dean Phillips (D-MN), who was primarying Biden at the time of its release, honed in on the parts about Biden’s age when he stated that the report “simply affirms what most Americans already know and all but handed the 2024 election to Donald Trump” if Biden is the Democratic nominee.

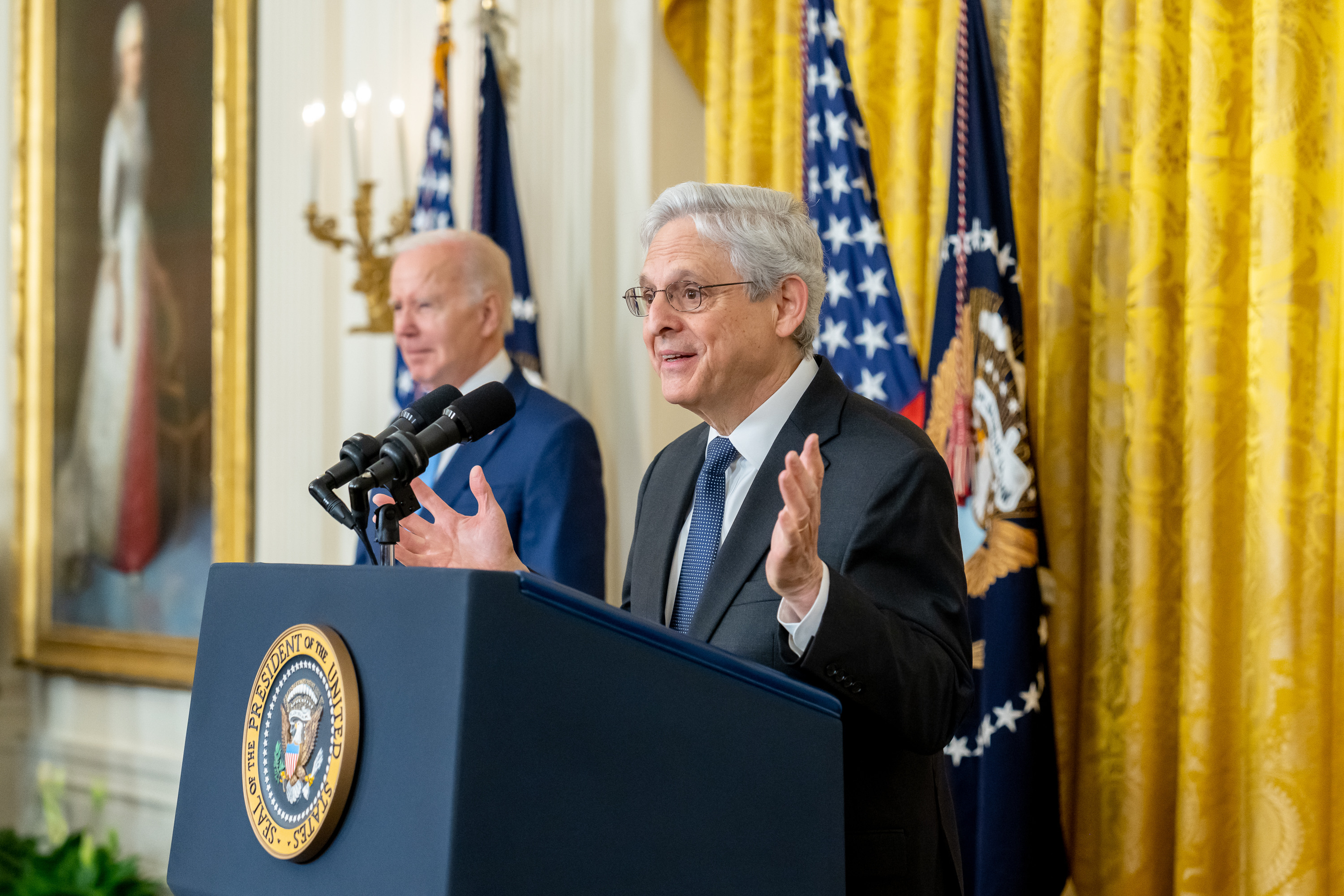
Garland speaking in May 2023, with Biden in the background

As a special counsel, Hur was required to provide an explanation for his decision not to prosecute Biden. Some legal experts and government officials have stated that Hur's report contained unnecessary commentary on Biden's mental acuity, beyond what was required as an explanation. Former attorney general Eric Holder said the Hur report "contains way too many gratuitous remarks and is flatly inconsistent with long standing DOJ traditions," adding that if they had "been subject to a normal DOJ review these remarks would undoubtedly have been excised." The president was upset that attorney general Merrick Garland had not reined in the report, though under special counsel regulations Garland would be required to notify Congress of any changes he made, which might raise allegations of political interference. Ian Sams, a spokesman for the White House Counsel's office, suggested that Hur, a Republican appointed as a US attorney by Trump, may have felt pressure to include the damaging language about Biden to appease others in his party who might attack him for not criminally charging the president. Law professor Barbara McQuade stated that Hur's comments "besmirched" Biden and went beyond what was necessary to demonstrate a lack of sufficient evidence to charge him.

Other current and former DOJ officials have stated that Hur's detailed explanation was well within Justice Department guidelines for special counsels, giving relevant information on his decision against charging Biden. They mentioned that Hur's narrative was likely motivated by self-preservation, as he needed to justify not charging Biden when Trump was indicted for similar, albeit far more serious offenses. Former prosecutors described Hur's executive summary, containing many "quotable" characterizations about Biden's memory and age, as reading like a "standard internal department memo" justifying non-prosecution. Steven Tyrell, who once led the DOJ's fraud department, defended the level of detail Hur included in his report, saying it was very important "to articulate the basis for any charging decision". Former DEA Acting Administrator Chuck Rosenberg defended Hur on accusations of partisanship, noting that he is obligated to assess a jury's view of Biden. Rosenberg said some language describing Biden was "arguably disparaging", allowing for usage in political attacks upon public disclosure, which was likely to occur. He criticized special counsel regulations as contributing to these issues. Associate deputy attorney general Bradley Weinsheimer, the DOJ's senior nonpolitical career official, rejected White House criticisms, stating that the report's comments "fall well within the department’s standards for public release".

Trump administration attorney Mark Lytle criticized the report's detailing of Biden's mental acuity, saying that it made allegations against Biden without him being able to defend himself before a court of law. Conservative legal scholar Jonathan Turley defended Hur's inclusion of such details, saying it was necessary to justify not charging Biden and that Hur was expected to provide a detailed report.

Attorney General Garland stated that Hur had never proposed an investigative step which he found to be inappropriate.

Medical experts stated that the report's judgements regarding Biden's mental ability were not scientifically based and did not resemble medical methods of assessing cognitive impairment.

Jake Tapper, while discussing his 2025 book Original Sin, said the White House was most concerned about, and sought to remove, the "well-meaning, elderly man with a poor memory" line from the Hur report. Of Biden's post-Hur press conference:

[H]e attacks Robert Hur for bringing up Beau Biden. And he says something like, and I said to myself, how dare you ask about that? Robert Hur had not brought up Beau Biden ... the entire White House apparatus starts attacking Robert Hur. What a cruel, mean man, to bring up Bo [sic] Biden. How awful? How dare he? I even heard from a conservative Gold Star mom I know, very conservative, who couldn't believe that Robert Hur would do that to Joe Biden, for whom she didn't vote. And it's not true. He didn't bring it up. Robert Hur and the Justice Department did not respond. They could have responded. They could have released that part of the transcript to show that Biden was wrong, but that's just not how the Justice Department operates.

=== Congressional ===
House Oversight Committee chairman James Comer (R-KY) wrote to NARA and the White House counsel on January 10, 2023, requesting documents and communications between them and the Justice Department. He wrote he was investigating possible political bias by NARA by contrasting how the Biden and Trump documents matters were handled. Comer stated that his committee planned to investigate who had access to Penn Biden Center.

The House Judiciary Committee opened an investigation on January 13, 2023. Committee chairman Jim Jordan wrote to Garland demanding all documents and communications between the FBI, Justice Department and White House about the matter, as well as information about Hur's appointment as special counsel.

In addition, the Congressional "Gang of Eight" requested to have a briefing on the matters of the Trump and Biden classified document matters, as well as the Mike Pence classified documents matter. In late February 2023, they were given an initial briefing by a number officials, including Assistant Attorney General Matthew G. Olsen, National Intelligence Director Avril Haines, and assistant director of the FBI's counterintelligence division Alan Kohler.

The Judiciary and Oversight committees issued subpoenas for the Department of Justice to turn over materials from the investigation, including audio recordings of Biden's interview with Hur. Biden invoked executive privilege over the materials, preventing their disclosure. The House of Representatives subsequently held Garland in contempt of Congress for defying the subpoenas on June 12, 2024. Despite this, it has been acknowledged that due to Biden's decision to exert executive privilege, a criminal case against Garland would be highly unlikely. On July 11, 2024, an attempt by the House of Representatives to find Garland in "inherent contempt" of Congress fell short in a 204 to 210 vote, with four Republicans voting with all Democrats to oppose the measure. The resolution would have imposed a fine of $10,000 per day on Garland for defying a congressional subpoena until he handed over audio of former special counsel Robert Hur's interview with President Joe Biden.

== See also ==
- FBI investigation into Donald Trump's handling of government documents
- Mike Pence classified documents incident
