= Mike Pence classified documents incident =

2023–present political incident

- Date: January 2023
- Location: Mike Pence's personal residence in Indiana
- Cause: Discovery of classified documents in the possession of former Vice President Mike Pence
- Outcome: Federal investigation lasting several months and resulting in no charges

In January 2023, Gregory Jacob, an attorney for former U.S. Vice President Mike Pence, said that a "small number" of classified documents had been found at Pence's house in Carmel, Indiana. The documents were originally obtained during Pence's time in the first Trump administration.

Jacob said Pence had engaged outside attorneys to search his home "out of an abundance of caution" after it was reported that classified documents were found in President Joe Biden's home and former office. The discovered documents were collected and removed by the Federal Bureau of Investigation (FBI). A later FBI search of Pence's residence, agreed to by Pence, found a single additional classified document. On June 2, 2023, media outlets reported that Pence was informed by the United States Department of Justice that the investigation into him had been concluded and that he would not be charged.

== Background ==
In August 2022, after the FBI search of Mar-a-Lago related to the FBI investigation into Donald Trump's handling of government documents, Pence claimed that, "Before we left the White House, the attorneys on my staff went through all the documents at both the White House and our offices there and at the vice president’s residence to ensure that any documents that needed to be turned over to the National Archives, including classified documents, were turned over. So we went through a very careful process in that regard." During the August interview with the Associated Press, Pence claimed that he didn't take any classified information when he left the office, and he had no knowledge of any classified information that he had retained after he left the office. In a November interview with ABC News, Pence reiterated his claim that he did not take any documents from the White House to his home in Indiana.

In January 2023, commenting on the Joe Biden classified documents incident, Pence remarked in an appearance on Fox Business, that, "The handling of classified materials and the nation's secret is a very serious matter and as a former vice president of the United States, I can speak from personal experience about the attention that ought to be paid to those materials when you're in office and after you leave office," stating that with Biden, "clearly that did not take place in this case."

== Discovery of documents ==
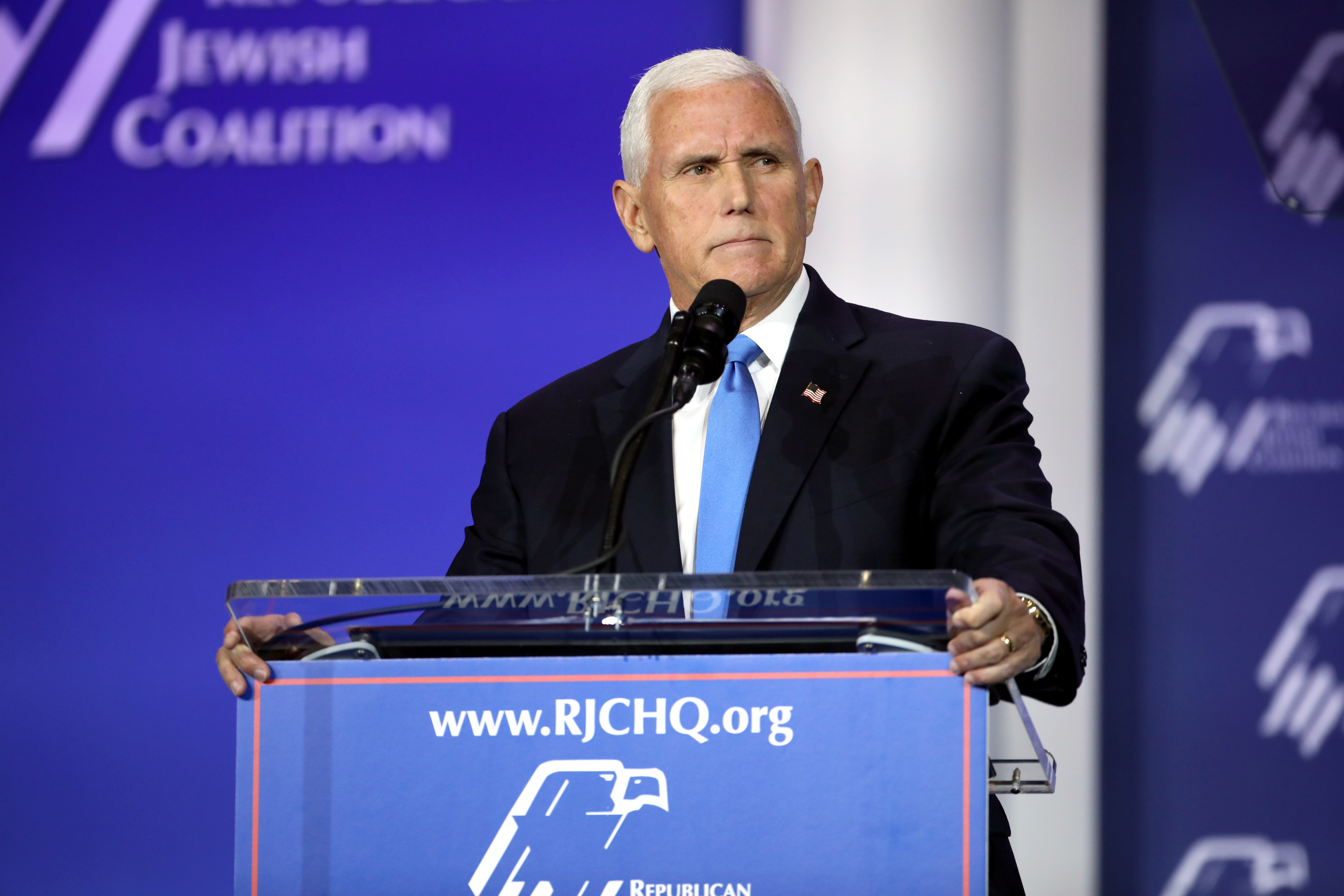
Pence speaking in Las Vegas in October 2023

Pence attorney Gregory Jacob stated that on January 16, Pence engaged outside counsels that had experience with handling classified documents to review four boxes of documents located at his residence in Carmel, Indiana. Jacob stated that Pence had searched for documents "out of an abundance of caution" after the early January Joe Biden classified documents incident.

On January 18, Jacob informed the National Archives and Records Administration about the discovery of the classified documents on Pence's residence in Indiana. He claimed that the documents were "inadvertently boxed and transported" to Pence's home at the end of Trump's presidency.

On the night of January 19, at 9:30 pm, with agreement by Pence, some of the documents were removed by agents from the Federal Bureau of Investigation's (FBI) Indianapolis field office.

On January 20, Jacob offered the Archives to hand over four boxes of the documents, in addition of the documents that the FBI had collected. The Archives indicated that they could not collect the boxes, and decided to allow Pence's agents to transport the boxes to Washington DC. Jacob delivered the documents himself on January 23. The lawyer stated that the FBI bypassed "standard procedures" and requested "direct possession" of the documents.

Pence's lawyer stated that a "small number of documents that could potentially contain sensitive or classified information" were locked in a safe at Pence's Indiana residence. However, CBS News reported that one of Pence's aides said the documents were found inside storage boxes located within an insecure area of Pence's home. The aide claimed that the boxes were taped shut and not opened. CNN reported that the documents were moved to the safe when the documents were known to be classified. CNN also reported that the classification markings of the documents were "low level" and there were no documents with SCI or SAP markings. The documents included materials such as background briefing memos that were prepared for Pence's foreign trips while he was the vice president.

== Federal investigation ==
On February 10, 2023, the FBI conducted a five-hour search of Pence's residence, uncovering a single additional classified document. Pence had consented to the search.

The Congressional "Gang of Eight" requested to have a briefing on the matters of the Trump, Biden, and Pence classified document matters. In late-February 2023, they were given an initial briefing by a number of officials, including Assistant Attorney General Matthew G. Olsen, National Intelligence Director Avril Haines, and assistant director of the FBI's counterintelligence division Alan Kohler.

In June 2023, the Department of Justice notified Pence that its investigation had ended and that the Department of Justice had decided not to charge him. Pence announced his candidacy for the Republican nomination for president days later.

== See also ==
- FBI investigation into Donald Trump's handling of government documents
- Joe Biden classified documents incident
