= King & Spalding =

American law firm

King & Spalding LLP
- Headquarters: Symphony Tower; Atlanta, Georgia, US
- No. of offices: 25
- Offices: North America, Europe, Middle East, Asia
- No. of attorneys: 1,300+
- Major practice areas: Corporate law, financing transactions, government investigations and white collar crime, litigation, mergers and acquisitions, regulatory law
- Key people: Robert D. Hays (Chairman)
- Revenue: ▲$1.83 billion USD (2022)
- Date founded: 1885; 141 years ago
- Company type: LLP
- Website: kslaw.com

King & Spalding LLP (K&S) is an American multinational corporate white-shoe law firm that is headquartered in Atlanta, Georgia, with offices located in North America, Europe, the Middle East, and Asia. It has over 1,300 lawyers in 25 offices globally. It is an Am Law 100, Global 30 firm.

== About ==
King & Spalding, also known as "K&S", was founded on January 1, 1885 by Alexander C. King and Jack Spalding in Atlanta, Georgia Atlanta remains the global headquarters of the firm.

The firm has additional offices in Austin, Charlotte, Chicago, Denver, Houston, Los Angeles, Miami, New York, Northern Virginia, San Francisco, Silicon Valley, and Washington, D.C.. K&S also has a London-based international arm, King & Spalding International LLP, which opened in 2003, and maintains offices or affiliates in Abu Dhabi, Brussels, Dubai, Frankfurt, Geneva, Paris, Riyadh, Singapore, and Tokyo.

=== Representative clients ===
The firm has represented various large companies and private equity funds.

The firm "advises Donald Trump's real estate empire", according to one report which also cited the American Civil Liberties Union on the subject. The partnership includes former senior U.S. government officials who joined or rejoined the firm after government service; these officials include Sally Yates, Rod Rosenstein, Zachary T. Fardon, and many others.

In 2018 the firm filed a Foreign Agents Registration Act application notifying their work as an advisor to the Saudi Arabian organization King Abdullah City for Atomic and Renewable Energy, which was created by King Abdullah bin Abdulaziz Al Saud to pursue a nuclear program. It received $705,171.21 for this advice.

The firm has also represented the steel-manufacturing corporation Cleveland-Cliffs.

=== Rankings ===
In 2023, The American Lawyer named King & Spalding Law Firm of the Year. On the "Vault Law 100" list of the most prestigious law firms in the United States, King & Spalding was ranked No.39 for 2024, moving up from No.43 in 2019. For 2024, King & Spalding was the 22nd largest law firm by revenue in the world, No.22 in the Global 200 firms, and No.17 in AmLaw 200 firms. In February 2020, King & Spalding was named to the WTR1000 list by World Trademark Review.

== Partners ==
In 1913, E. Marvin Underwood became Assistant Attorney General of the United States. In 1918, the presidential administration of King's & Spalding's former Atlanta law colleague Woodrow Wilson appointed founder Alexander Campbell King as the Solicitor General of the United States. King & Spalding's senior partners include former United States Attorney General Griffin Bell (now deceased). Georgia's former US Senator and director of The Coca-Cola Company Sam Nunn (now retired), former Indiana U.S. Senator and then Director of National Intelligence in the first Trump Administration Dan Coats, former Florida US Senator Connie Mack, and former Georgia governor George Busbee (now deceased) also joined the firm after their respective retirements from public office. From 1981 to 1984, retired partner Bob Woodward served in the Office of Tax Legislative Counsel of the U.S. Treasury Department, holding the positions of Tax Legislative Counsel in 1983-1984 and Associate Tax Legislative Counsel in 1982–1983. Chilton Varner was appointed to the Federal Civil Rules Advisory Committee by Chief Justice William Rehnquist in 2004 and reappointed by Chief Justice John Roberts in 2007.

King & Spalding maintains a prominent White Collar Defense (called "Special Matters and Government Investigations") team founded by former United States Attorney General Griffin Bell, that includes many prominent former prosecutors. The Special Matters team focuses exclusively on white-collar defense, civil and regulatory investigations, corporate internal investigations, and investigations before the U.S. Congress. Former Director of the Federal Bureau of Investigation, Christopher A. Wray, joined the firm in late 2005 before being appointed by President Donald J. Trump in 2017. Zachary Fardon, who was previously an associate from 1992 to 1996 and rejoined the Chicago office as a partner in 2017, served as U.S. Attorney for the Northern District of Illinois from 2013 to 2017. In 2018, former U.S. Deputy Attorney General and Acting Attorney General Sally Yates rejoined the firm's Special Matters and Government practice group as a partner. Rod J. Rosenstein, former U.S. Deputy Attorney General in the first Donald Trump administration, joined the firm's D.C. Office as a partner in 2020.

The firm's current chairman Robert D. Hays has held the position since 2005. Former Atlanta M&A partner Mike Egan, who previously served as counsel to the Atlanta Falcons, was hired by Arthur Blank to be General Counsel of AMB Group LLC. In May 2017, Jim Woolery joined the firm's Corporate, Finance & Investments practice group from hedge fund Hudson Executive Capital. Woolery was soon thereafter joined in the firm's New York City office by infrastructure M&A dealmaker Jonathan Melmed in August 2018. Randy Mastro, who led the litigation practice at Gibson, Dunn & Crutcher for more than 20 years and represented clients including AIG, Chevron, DraftKings and former Governor of New Jersey Chris Christie, joined the firm as partner in August 2022.

In March 2026, Daniel Nam was added to the firm as a partner.

=== Application of Tile VII to attorney employment contracts ===
In 1984, the United States Supreme Court ruled that Elizabeth Anderson Hishon had a contract with King & Spalding that was subject to Title VII of the Civil Rights Act of 1964, and that Hishon was entitled to her day in court, in Hishon v. King & Spalding. Hishon challenged the firm's decision to fire her after seven years based on their decision to not elevate her to partnership. Hishon noted that the only other female attorney ever hired before her had worked from 1944 to 1977 as the firm's sole "permanent associate," while more than fifty men hired after her became partners. The ruling was that Title VII applied to attorney employment, not that Hishon was entitled to relief, and Hishon and King & Spalding settled the case out of court after the ruling with Hishon opening her own practice.

== Transactions and cases ==
Originally focused on Southern U.S. railroad and utility consolidation transactions in the 19th and early 20th centuries, King & Spalding's international mergers and acquisitions practice has more recently advised on corporate transactions. Atlanta M&A partner W. Calvin "Cal" Smith, who recruited Woolery to the M&A practice, has acted for clients such as Popeyes Louisiana Kitchen in its $1.8 billion sale to Restaurant Brands International and Energizer in its $2 billion acquisition of the Rayovac and VARTA battery brands from Spectrum Brands.

The firm provided Guantanamo Bay attorneys for six Yemeni detainees, including Mohammed Al-Adahi. The firm was appointed as independent counsel to the Special Court for Sierra Leone, following allegations of war crimes against the country's former president, and undertook litigation and research assistance for the prosecutor's office in the U.N.-assisted Khmer Rouge Tribunal.

=== Impact on the City of Atlanta and the State of Georgia ===
The firm played a pivotal role in the creation of the largest bank holding company in Georgia, The Trust Company of Georgia (now known as SunTrust Banks), as the firm's first M&A lawyers, including Hughes Spalding, advised early predecessors of The Trust Company of Georgia in transformative corporate reorganizations and combinations with other regional banking institutions, including the separation of Trust Company of Georgia from Atlanta National Bank and Lowry National Bank shortly following revisions to the law under the 1933 Banking Act and the merger of Trust Company of Georgia with Sun Banks in 1985.

In 1995, King & Spalding lawyers, led by partner Horace Sibley, advised the Atlanta Committee for the Olympic Games, which staged the 1996 Olympics in Atlanta. In the 1800s, the King & Spalding firm incorporated and filed the charter documents of the Piedmont Driving Club. In 2006, former K&S partner Joseph Bankoff was unanimously appointed Chief Executive Officer of Atlanta's Woodruff Arts Center. A team of partners from the firm's Corporate, Finance & Investments team put together documentation to construct, brand, market and operate the Mercedes-Benz Stadium. The same King & Spalding team represented the City of Atlanta in its winning bid to host Super Bowl LIII in 2019. In 2014, Atlanta M&A partner Mike Egan advised Arthur Blank in the expansion of the Atlanta United FC. In 2015, Atlanta M&A partner Rahul Patel advised certain investors in the Atlanta Hawks NBA basketball franchise in a recapitalization transaction involving Grant Hill, Sarah Blakely and Jesse Itzler. In 2005, Egan and Atlanta M&A partner Ray Baltz represented Atlanta Spirit LLC in its acquisition of the Atlanta Hawks, Atlanta Thrashers and the operating rights to Philips Arena in a transaction valued at $241 million. Corporate lawyers from King & Spalding have also represented the investors and the management team of the BB&T Atlanta Open, an ATP World Tour 250 tennis championship held annually in Midtown Atlanta. The firm maintains close ties to the University of Georgia School of Law, which is home to the Alexander Campbell King Law Library; former K&S partner Mike Raeber serves as the University's general counsel, and several of its law professors were former King & Spalding associates.

=== Defense of the Defense of Marriage Act ===
In April 2011, the firm signed a $500,000 contract with the Republican-controlled United States House of Representatives to take on the case of defending the Defense of Marriage Act, which defines marriage in federal law as the union between one man and one woman, in court for the House, with partner (and former Solicitor General) Paul Clement as its lead attorney. After the contract was signed, the gay rights group Human Rights Campaign announced it would launch a publicity war to "shame" the firm and planned protest, ads in legal publications, and to try to influence students and potential clients dealings with the firm. Soon after signing, the firm asked to withdraw from the case after facing criticism from gay rights groups, citing an "inadequate" vetting process. Clement immediately resigned from the firm, writing in a letter to King & Spalding Chairman Robert Hays, "I resign out of the firmly-held belief that a representation should not be abandoned because the client's legal position is extremely unpopular in certain quarters. Defending unpopular decisions is what lawyers do...Efforts to delegitimize any representation for one side of a legal controversy are a profound threat to the rule of law." He added, "If there were problems with the firm's vetting process, we should fix the vetting process, not drop the representation." Clement immediately joined Bancroft PLLC, which took the case. The National Law Journal wrote that the event "leaves unanswered a myriad of questions about the status of Clement's other cases and clients, and the future of King & Spalding's D.C. appellate practice, which was built around Clement."

The firm was criticized by those in the legal community on both sides of the same-sex marriage issue for the decision; Attorney General of the United States Eric Holder compared the situation to the criticism of lawyers tasked with defending Guantanamo Bay detainees, saying, "It was something we dealt with here in the Department of Justice...The people who criticized our people here at the Justice Department were wrong then as are people who criticized Paul Clement for the representation that he's going to continue." Former Attorney General Michael Mukasey said, "Although lawyers are not obligated in the first instance to take all comers, they are very much obligated not to quit in the face of criticism once they do take on a client. This is a bad message to send to lawyers and to clients." The decision shocked those lawyers involved in Supreme Court cases. Speaker of the House John Boehner issued a statement condemning the firm's "careless disregard for its responsibilities to the House in this constitutional matter." Theodore Olson, Clement's predecessor as Solicitor General and a same-sex marriage supporter, said, "I don't know of anything comparable to this. You have to be willing to stand your ground."

Talking Points Memo reported that Coca-Cola "directly intervened to press the firm to extricate itself from the case."

After King & Spalding dropped the case, Attorney General of Virginia Ken Cuccinelli terminated his office's relationship with the firm, writing in a letter to the firm that their "willingness to drop a client, the U.S. House of Representatives, in connection with the lawsuit challenging the Defense of Marriage Act (DOMA) was such an obsequious act of weakness that I feel compelled to end your legal association with Virginia so that there is no chance that one of my legal clients will be put in the embarrassing and difficult situation like the client you walked away from, the House of Representatives." The National Rifle Association of America soon did the same.

=== Participation in Trump administration election lawsuits ===
In the immediate aftermath of the 2020 presidential election, King & Spalding was criticized for choosing to represent the Trump campaign in a lawsuit in North Carolina seeking to block the state from implementing a rule allowing an extension for the receipt of mail-in ballots. Protesters gathered outside the firm's D.C. office on November 13. Protesters including Eliza Orlins, a public defender and candidate for Manhattan district attorney, and others characterized the election lawsuits by King & Spalding, Jones Day, Porter Wright Morris & Arthur LLP, and other law firms as frivolous, highly unlikely to overturn the election result, and damaging to the integrity of American democracy.

== See also ==
- List of largest law firms by profits per partner
