= William L. Frierson =

American lawyer

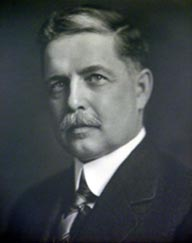

16th United States Solicitor General
- In office June 1, 1920 – June 30, 1921
- President: Woodrow Wilson
- Preceded by: Alexander C. King
- Succeeded by: James M. Beck

Personal details
- Born: September 3, 1868 Shelbyville, Tennessee
- Died: May 25, 1953 (aged 84) Columbia, Tennessee
- Education: Southwestern Presbyterian University

William Little Frierson (September 3, 1868 – May 25, 1953) was an American lawyer, judge, and politician. During his career he served as the United States Solicitor General (1920–1921), United States Assistant Attorney General (1917–1920), and mayor of Chattanooga, Tennessee (1905–1907).

== Biography ==
Frierson was born on September 3, 1868, in Shelbyville, Tennessee to Robert Payne and Mary (Little) Frierson. He graduated in 1887 from Southwestern Presbyterian University in Clarksville, Tennessee (now Rhodes College. In 1929, Frierson received an honorary law degree from the college in Memphis, Tennessee. He began practicing law in his hometown of Shelbyville in 1889. The following year he moved to Chattanooga, where he worked in various law firms until 1917.

Frierson held a variety of local government positions before being appointed United States Solicitor General. In 1905, Frierson was elected mayor of Chattanooga and held that position until 1907. He served as city attorney from 1912 to 1915. Subsequently, Frierson was named a special justice of the Tennessee Supreme Court in 1916. In 1917, Frierson was appointed United States Assistant Attorney General, a position he held until 1920. During his time as Assistant Attorney General, he was involved in the Hughes Aircraft Investigation, where he questioned witnesses to the production and inspection of timber for American aircraft. In June 1920, President Woodrow Wilson nominated and the Senate confirmed Frierson to be solicitor general. As SG, Frierson made persuasive arguments upholding the National Prohibition Act of 1919, which enforced the Eighteenth Amendment to the U.S. Constitution dealing with the prohibition of alcohol. When the question arose regarding the sale and possession of alcohol by Americans on ships, the Supreme Court agreed with his argument that no liquor could be sold on any U.S. flagged vessels.

After serving as solicitor general, Frierson returned to Chattanooga to be a member of the Williams & Frierson law firm. From 1922 to 1923, he served as president of the Tennessee State Bar Association. William married Margaret (Daniel) on April 20, 1892, with whom he had three children: Margaret Williamson, Robert Payne, and Sue Lawwill. On May 25, 1953, Frierson died of a cerebral hemorrhage at the age of 84.

Legal offices
Preceded by Alexander C. King	Solicitor General; 1920–1921	Succeeded by James M. Beck
