= Zachary T. Fardon =

American attorney (born 1966)

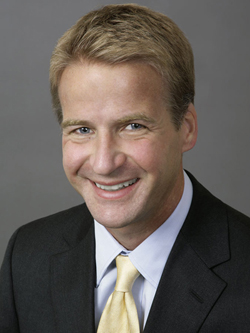

United States Attorney for the Northern District of Illinois
- In office October 23, 2013 – March 13, 2017
- President: Barack Obama; Donald Trump
- Preceded by: Patrick Fitzgerald
- Succeeded by: John Lausch

Personal details
- Born: 1966 (age 59–60) Kansas City, Missouri, U.S.
- Education: Vanderbilt University (BA, JD)

Zachary Thomas Fardon (born 1966) is an American attorney who served as the United States Attorney for the Northern District of Illinois. He began serving as the U.S. Attorney in Chicago on October 23, 2013, after President Obama signed his commission. He resigned on March 13, 2017.

== Personal ==
Fardon was born in Kansas City and raised in Knoxville, Tennessee. He graduated in 1988 from Vanderbilt University in Nashville, Tennessee, where he also earned his J.D. degree in 1992. He is married and has three children.

== Career ==
From 1992 to 1996, Fardon worked as an associate at King & Spalding in Washington, D.C. In 1997, Fardon became an Assistant U.S. Attorney in Chicago and tried several high-profile cases, including the 2005-06 public corruption trial against former Illinois Governor George Ryan. From 2003 to 2006, he served as First Assistant U.S. Attorney for the Middle District of Tennessee in Nashville, where he supervised approximately 30 Assistant U.S. Attorneys in all federal criminal and civil matters.

As a prosecutor, Fardon received numerous awards, including recognition for superior performance by the Department of Justice, as well as the Chicago Crime Commission Star of Distinction Award, the Frank J. McGarr Award for Excellence in Service to the United States, and the Cook County Crime Fighters Excellence in Law Enforcement Award.

In 2007, Fardon became a partner at Latham & Watkins LLP, where he chaired the Litigation Department in Chicago. His practice at Latham focused on internal investigations, white collar defense, and complex business litigation. He was recognized as a leading white collar and government investigations lawyer. While in private practice, Fardon also served as adjunct professor at Northwestern University School of Law and was active on multiple civic and professional boards.

He began serving as the U.S. Attorney in Chicago on October 23, 2013, after President Obama signed his commission. He resigned on March 13, 2017. After his tenure as the U.S. Attorney in Chicago, Fardon subsequently rejoined King & Spalding as a partner, and opened the firm's Chicago office.

== See also ==
- 2017 dismissal of U.S. attorneys
- Advisory Committee of U.S. Attorneys
