= Alexander Campbell King Law Library =

Coordinates: 33.939°N 83.387°W

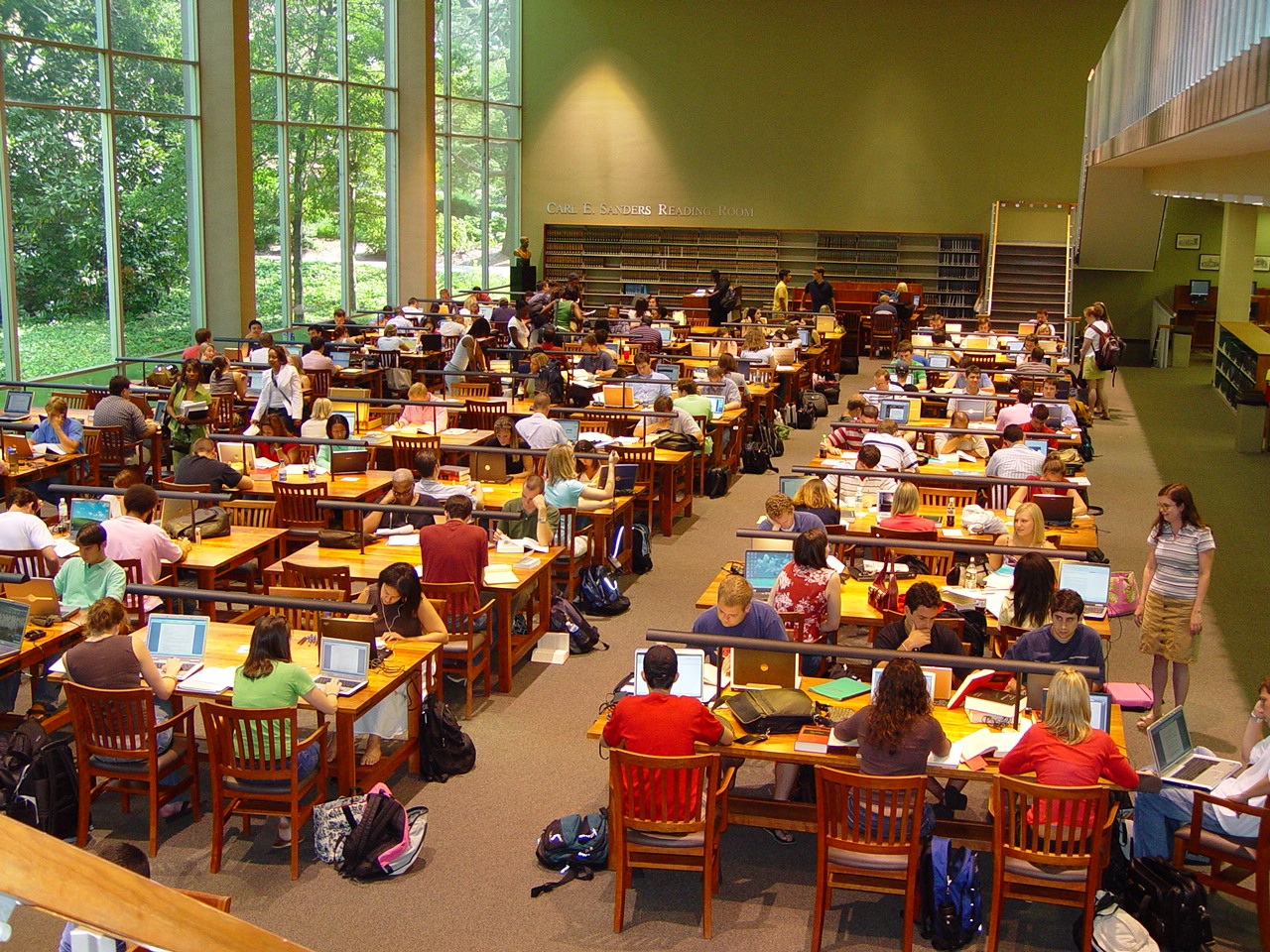
Carl E. Sanders Reading Room of the Alexander Campbell King Law Library

The Alexander Campbell King Law Library is the main law library of the University of Georgia School of Law. It is located in Hirsch Hall, one of two law school buildings on the nationally recognized historic North Quadrangle of the University of Georgia campus in Athens, Georgia. It also features the Louis B. Sohn Library on International Relations, located inside the Dean Rusk International Law Center, in the law school's Dean Rusk Hall. It is named after the famous Georgia jurist Alexander Campbell King, who would become a founding partner of the international law firm King & Spalding LLP, a firm with which the University of Georgia has close ties.

The library holds more than a half million digital and print titles and is a leader in the provision of information in electronic formats. Its collection is particularly strong in historical legal materials and comparative and international law. The library has won a number of awards and accolades over the years.
