= Alexander Campbell King =

American judge (1856–1926)

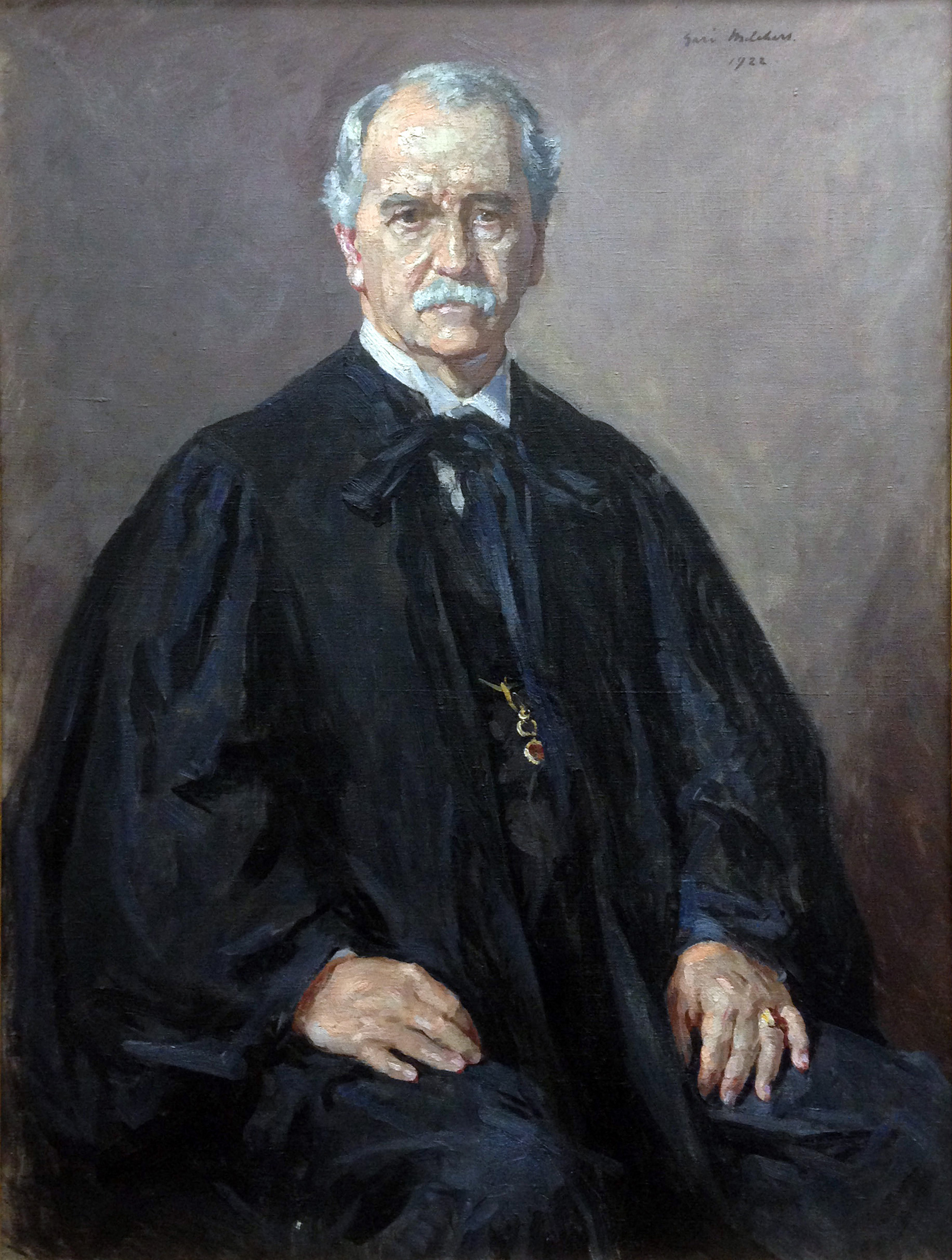
- 1922 portrait by Gari Melchers

Judge of the United States Court of Appeals for the Fifth Circuit
- In office May 24, 1920 – December 31, 1924
- Appointed by: Woodrow Wilson
- Preceded by: Don Albert Pardee
- Succeeded by: Rufus Edward Foster

16th Solicitor General of the United States
- In office November 21, 1918 – May 24, 1920
- President: Woodrow Wilson
- Preceded by: John W. Davis
- Succeeded by: William L. Frierson

Personal details
- Born: Alexander Campbell King; December 7, 1856 Charleston, South Carolina
- Died: July 25, 1926 (aged 69) Flat Rock, North Carolina
- Resting place: Atlanta, Georgia
- Education: Sewanee: The University of the South read law

Alexander Campbell King (December 7, 1856 – July 25, 1926) was the 16th Solicitor General of the United States and a United States circuit judge of the United States Court of Appeals for the Fifth Circuit. King was a founding partner of the international law firm of King & Spalding.

== Education and career ==
Born on December 7, 1856, in Charleston, South Carolina, to J. Gadsden King and Carolina Clifford (Postell) King, King read law in 1875, at 19 years of age. He entered private practice in Atlanta, Georgia from 1875 to 1918, serving as general legal counsel to various railroad companies. For the Atlanta & West Point Railroad he took the position of assistant general counsel from 1887 to 1893, simultaneously serving as general counsel for the East & West Railroad of Alabama from 1887 to 1889, and again as assistant general counsel to the Richmond and Danville Railroad and Richmond & West Point Terminal Co., from 1890 to 1892. Lastly, King represented the Chattanooga, Rome and Columbus Railroad from 1894 to 1901. In 1912, King was appointed to the United States Court of Appeals for the 5th Circuit, as a committee member to report on revision in equity in United States courts. He also served on the board of directors, and as one term chairman, of the State Bar Examiners for the State of Georgia from 1913 to 1918. In 1916, King received a civil law degree from Sewanee: The University of the South, in Sewanee, Tennessee.

== Solicitor General ==
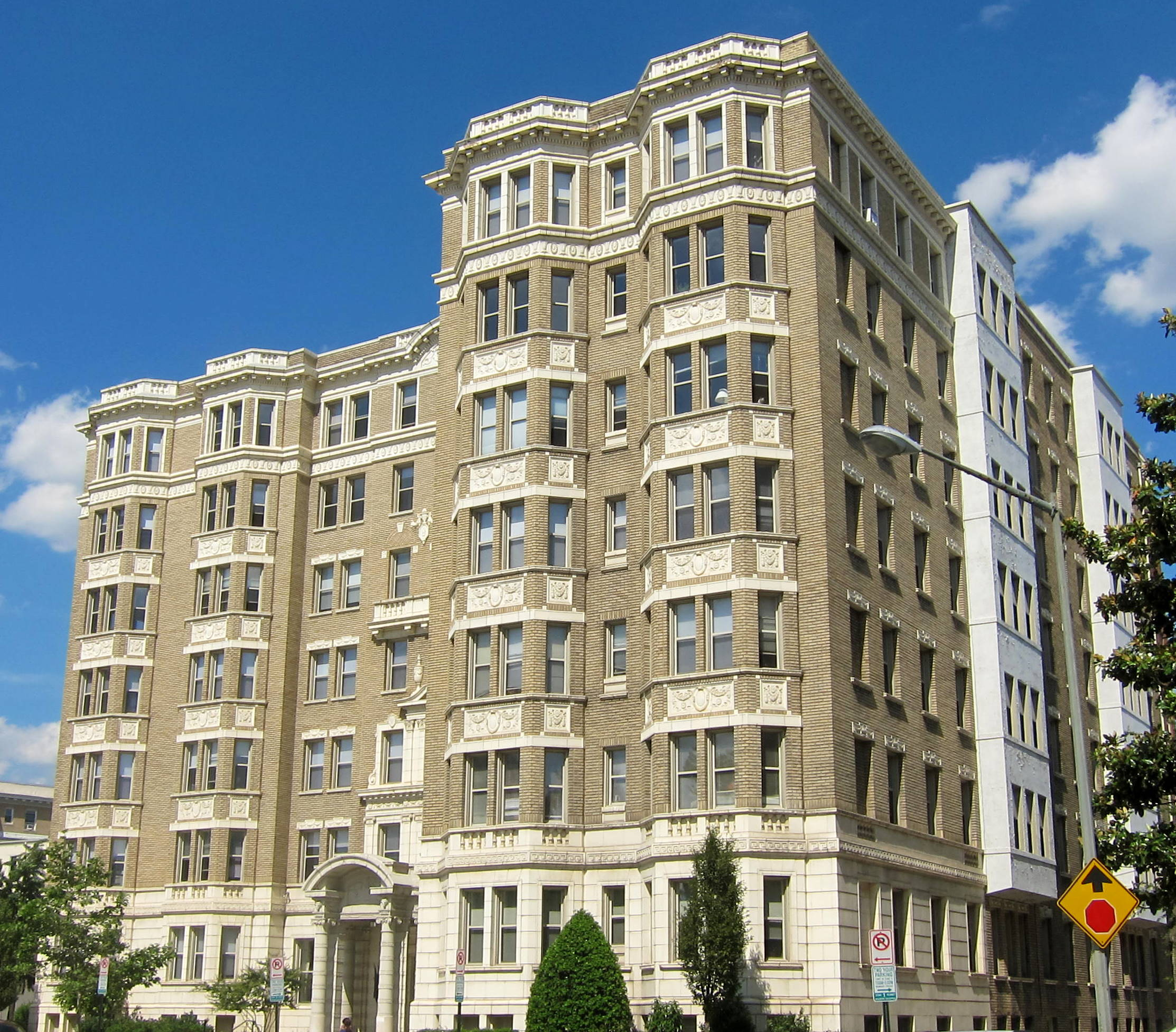
King's former residence in Adams Morgan, Washington, D.C.

King was the 16th Solicitor General of the United States from November 21, 1918, to May 24, 1920. With his breadth of knowledge in railroad legislation he was a valuable asset to the administration, contributing his expertise when faced with cases involving the Southern Pacific Railroad throughout 1919. During this time he also served as a counselor for the American Red Cross.

== Federal judicial service ==
King was nominated by President Woodrow Wilson on April 29, 1920, to a seat on the United States Court of Appeals for the Fifth Circuit vacated by Judge Don Albert Pardee. He was confirmed by the United States Senate on May 24, 1920, and received his commission the same day. His service terminated on December 31, 1924, due to his resignation.

== Post judicial service and death ==
Following his resignation from the federal bench, King returned to private practice in Atlanta from 1925 to 1926, returning as a founding partner of the law firm of King, Spalding, MacDougal & Sibley (now King & Spalding). He died on July 25, 1926, (Note: His Federal Judicial Center Biography gives his death date as July 25, 1926, but his Solicitor General's biography gives his death date at July 26, 1926.) in Flat Rock, Henderson County, North Carolina. He was interred in Atlanta, where he resided. He was survived by his wife of 45 years, Alice May Fowler and his two sons.

== See also ==
- Alexander Campbell King Law Library

== Sources ==
Legal offices
Preceded by John W. Davis	16th Solicitor General of the United States; 1918–1920	Succeeded by William L. Frierson
Preceded by Don Albert Pardee	Judge of the United States Court of Appeals for the Fifth Circuit; 1920–1924	Succeeded by Rufus Edward Foster
