= FBI investigation into Donald Trump's handling of government documents =

2022–24 American criminal investigation

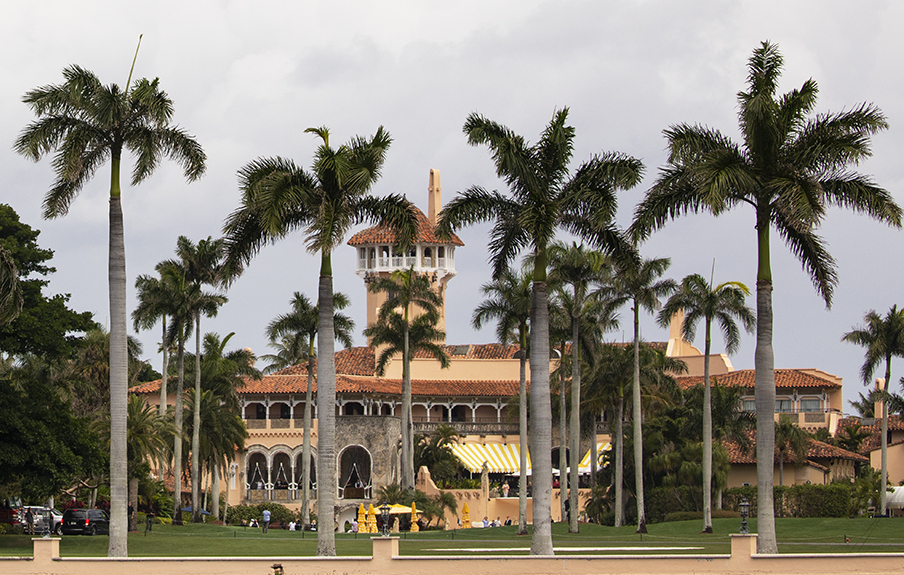
The Federal Bureau of Investigation discovered classified documents at Trump's residence, the Mar-a-Lago.

Plasmic Echo was the codename for a Federal Bureau of Investigation (FBI) criminal investigation into former President Donald Trump's handling of classified and national defense-related government documents beginning in 2022, looking for possible violations of the Espionage Act and obstruction of justice.

In November 2022, a special counsel investigation was launched to take over the FBI investigation, under the direction of Jack Smith, a special counsel appointed by United States Attorney General Merrick Garland.

On June 8, 2023, Trump was indicted on charges related to the documents in the Federal District Court in Miami. It was the first time a former U.S. president had faced federal charges. Trump was arraigned at the federal courthouse in Miami on June 13, 2023, on 37 criminal charges, pleading not guilty to all charges.

On November 25, 2024, Smith announced that he was seeking to drop all charges against Trump in the aftermath of Trump's victory in the 2024 United States presidential election.

== Background of Trump's handling of records ==
During his term in office, Trump's attitude toward and handling of classified information had worried U.S. federal intelligence officials. His behavior led to mistrust in intelligence and law enforcement agencies who were also alarmed by Trump's mixing with guests during his frequent trips to Mar-a-Lago, viewing the practice as "ripe to be exploited by a foreign spy service eager for access to the epicenter of American power".

In December 2019, Trump spoke to Washington Post journalist Bob Woodward privately in the Oval Office. Trump showed a photograph of himself with North Korean dictator Kim Jong-un, telling Woodward: "This is me and him. That's the line, right? Then I walked over the line. Pretty cool." Trump also showed Woodward letters that Kim had written to him, which the U.S. government had classified, adding: "And don't say I gave them to you, okay?" Woodward dictated the letters into his tape recorder, and in 2020, CNN published a transcript of two of these letters.

In 2021, Trump reportedly told close associates that he regarded some presidential documents, such as the correspondence with Kim, to be his personal property.

=== Destruction of presidential records ===
Trump illegally and regularly shredded "both sensitive and mundane" papers while at the White House, at Mar-a-Lago, and on Air Force One, despite repeated admonishments from at least two of his chiefs of staff and from White House counsel. His aides had developed special practices and protocols early in his presidency to retrieve the piles of torn paper and attempt to tape documents back together with the help of staffers from the Office of the Staff Secretary or the Oval Office Operations team.

Not all materials were recovered; Trump White House staffers frequently used "burn bags" to destroy documents. On at least two occasions, Trump allegedly flushed documents down the toilet at the White House residence.

=== Departure from office ===
Trump's presidential term ended at noon on January 20, 2021. His departure from the White House was "rushed and chaotic". In the last weeks of the Trump presidency, White House staff quit and aides resigned, leaving an increasing amount of work to a decreasing number of staff. A former Trump aide said they were "30 days behind what a typical administration would be", with White House chief of staff Mark Meadows and Trump taking little interest in the preservation of presidential records. The Wall Street Journal quoted a former aide as saying: "If you only start packing with two days left to go, you're just running low on time. And if he's the one just throwing things in boxes, who knows what could happen?"

The day before he left office, Trump designated seven senior Trump administration officials, including Meadows, White House counsel Pat Cipollone, and Deputy White House Counsel Patrick F. Philbin, "as his representatives to handle all future requests for presidential records" for compliance with the Presidential Records Act. Trump subsequently notified NARA to add Kash Patel, a former Trump administration official, and journalist John Solomon as "representatives for access to Presidential records of my administration".

Two years later, Trump admitted to taking classified documents from the White House during a televised response to a CNN reporter's questions. Trump said he had "every right" to take the documents and that he "didn't make a secret of it" at the time. "I took what I took," he said, falsely claiming that "it gets declassified". He also said that he "would have the right" to show the documents to others, but he claimed that he had not done so and could not recollect doing so.

=== Inter-presidency ===
The US head of state does not hold a formal security clearance, and is neither "read in" nor "read out" of classified matters, but according to former chief of staff John F. Kelly, Trump should have received an exit briefing "in some hopes that he would not violate all these rules on classified materials. The important message would have been, 'Once you're not the president anymore, all the rules apply to you'".

At the beginning of his term in office, President Joe Biden barred Trump from receiving the courtesy intelligence briefings traditionally given to former presidents, citing Trump's "erratic behavior". This is the first time a former president's access to the classified briefings has been denied.

== Origin and presidential transition ==
Following Trump's loss in the 2020 United States presidential election, talks began between the Trump administration and the National Archives and Records Administration (NARA) regarding transferring documents related to the Trump administration. Under the Presidential Records Act (44 U.S.C. §§ 2201–2209), any presidential documents under the current administration must be transferred to the Archivist of the United States by the end of their term. White House chief of staff Mark Meadows informed the National Archives during this period that he would take care of the documents. On January 18, 2021, at least two moving trucks were spotted outside Mar-a-Lago, Trump's private residence in Palm Beach, Florida. Pictures were taken on the day of his departure showing boxes of materials that he had taken with him.

In May 2021, the National Archives became aware of missing documents. Among the missing material were correspondence letters with Kim Jong-un and a congratulatory letter from former President Barack Obama. On May 6, Gary Stern—the general counsel for the National Archives—emailed Trump's representatives, including Patrick F. Philbin, to inform them that such material was missing. In the email, Stern named Pat Cipollone as a witness to the documents, identifying two dozen boxes that were in the White House but had not been transferred to the National Archives. Scott Gast, a representative for Trump, responded to Stern by giving him a note informing him that Trump would return his correspondence letters with Kim, although Trump was unclear on how to proceed. An archive official recommended FedEx as a method of transferring the documents; Trump aides objected to this idea, and Trump did not return the letters. Trump displayed these letters to people in his office, leading to Meadows contacting Philbin in an effort to figure out how to facilitate the return of these documents.

Trump's lawyers informed the National Archives in December that they had found 12 boxes of documents at the Mar-a-Lago.

== NARA retrieval of documents ==
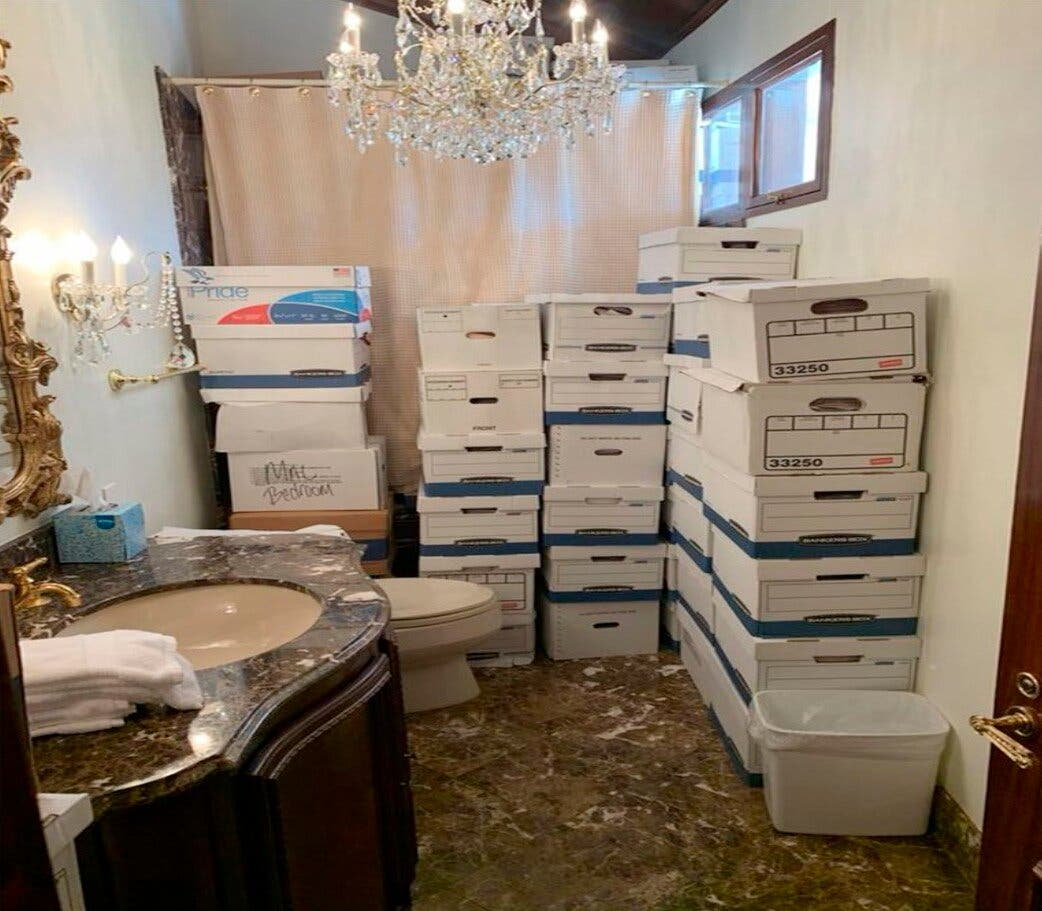
Document boxes in Mar-a-Lago bathroom

In January 2022, the National Archives had begun a process to retrieve 15 boxes that were taken from the White House at the end of Trump's term to his private Mar-a-Lago estate, and successfully negotiated with Trump's lawyers in retrieving the documents. Among what was contained in the documents was classified information.

Following the discovery, the National Archives notified the Justice Department and the House Committee on Oversight and Reform began an investigation into the documents. The Justice Department instructed the National Archives not to share any more details about the documents to the committee, implying that the FBI was beginning a separate investigation. Of the documents retrieved by NARA from Mar-a-Lago, archivists and federal agents determined that 184 unique documents had classification markings, of which 25 were marked "top secret", 92 "secret" and 67 "confidential". Some materials were governed by special access programs (SAP), a type of protocol reserved for extremely sensitive U.S. operations conducted abroad, intended to significantly limit access to the information.

== Investigation ==
=== Justice Department documents subpoenas ===
In May 2022, the Justice Department subpoenaed the National Archives in an attempt to obtain the documents, and had interviewed several White House officials who were present in the days leading up to Trump's departure from the White House, seemingly confirming that the Justice Department was beginning a grand jury investigation into the documents. The Justice Department also subpoenaed Trump in May 2022 to return all documents with classification markings. Between May 11 and June 3, one of Trump's attorneys, Evan Corcoran, took detailed notes of conversations in which he explained to Trump that he would indeed have to turn over all documents with classification markings.

On June 3, the Justice Department sent counterintelligence chief Jay I. Bratt and three FBI agents to Mar-a-Lago to retrieve the documents requested in the subpoena and meet with Trump's legal team. At the meeting, Christina Bobb, the Custodian of Records for purposes of the subpoena, gave a signed letter to the Justice Department certifying that a diligent search had been conducted and all documents responsive to the subpoena were being turned over. Trump's lawyers also claimed that all the documents were stored in a single basement storage room on the property.

On June 8, Bratt emailed Trump's lawyers, telling them to put a stronger lock on the basement and to keep all documents "preserved in that room in their current condition until further notice".

On June 19, Trump wrote to NARA, telling them that former Trump administration official Kash Patel, as well as journalist John Solomon, should be considered "representatives for access to Presidential records of my administration".

=== Mar-a-Lago security footage subpoena ===
On June 22, the Justice Department subpoenaed Mar-a-Lago surveillance footage, which reportedly showed people putting boxes into other containers and moving them out of the basement storage room.

The FBI suspected violations of the Espionage Act and obstruction of justice due to information from "a significant number of civilian witnesses", as stated in an affidavit. This affidavit was used to obtain a search warrant.

=== FBI search of Mar-a-Lago ===
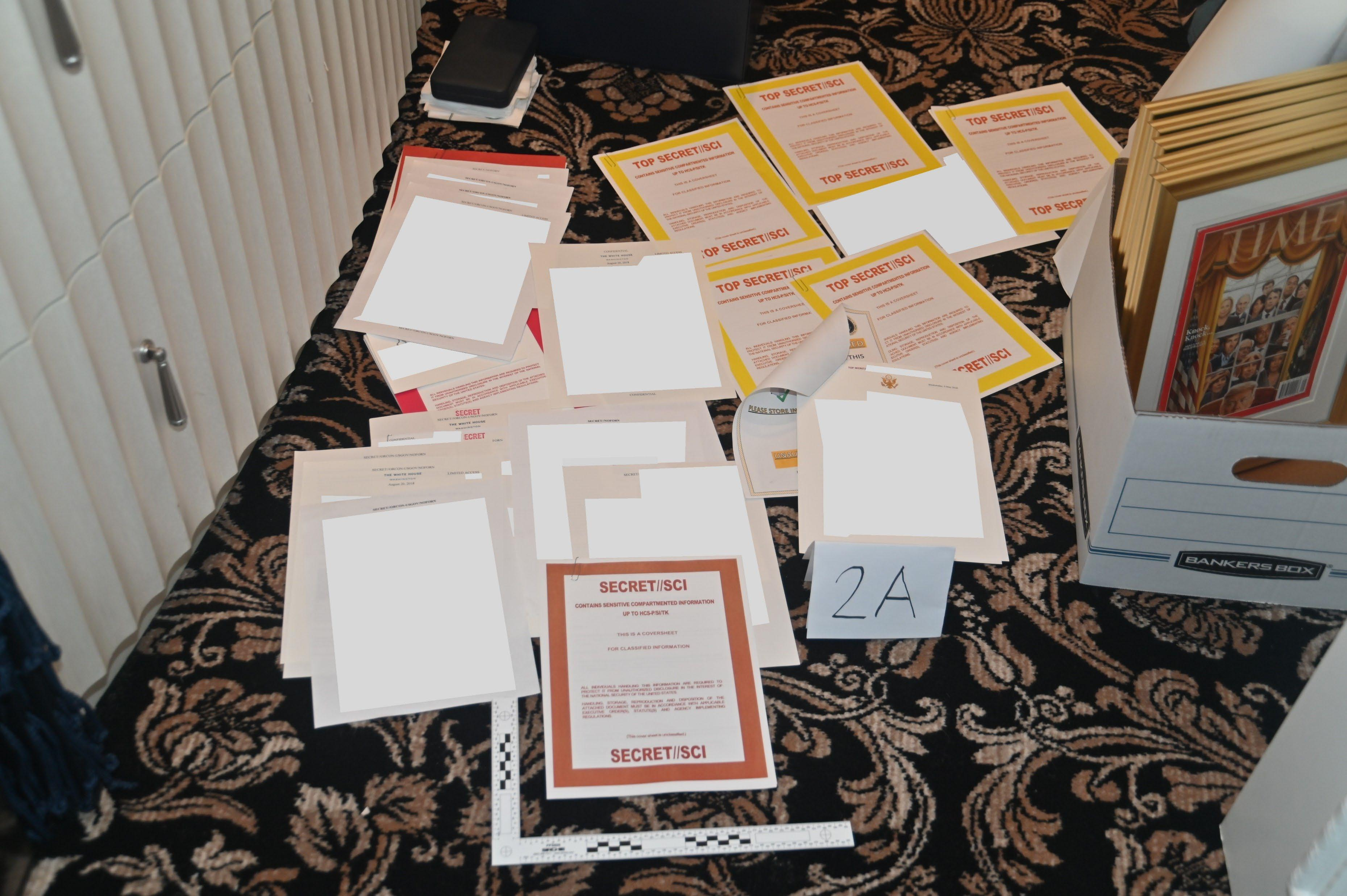
In response to a lawsuit by Donald Trump, the National Security Division and U.S. Attorney for the Southern District of Florida submitted a filing containing this image.

Having uncovered multiple sources of evidence that more classified documents remained at Mar-a-Lago and "government records were likely concealed and removed from the storage room and that efforts were likely taken to obstruct the government's investigation," the Justice Department sought a warrant to search Mar-a-Lago from a federal magistrate judge in early August 2022.

On August 8, 2022, the FBI executed the search warrant on Mar-a-Lago. Thousands of government documents were seized, some with classification markings: top secret/sensitive compartmented information (TS/SCI), top secret, secret, and confidential. TS/SCI is the highest possible classification and is supposed to be read exclusively in secure government facilities. One document was reported to be so secret, only six people had the legal authority to view it.

On August 26, 2022, the FBI released a redacted affidavit into its search of the Mar-a-Lago.

Across three interactions with Trump in 2022, including the August search of Mar-a-Lago, the government recovered approximately 13,000 documents totaling 21,792 pages. Some of the recovered classified documents, including top secret documents, had been stored in boxes with personal effects such as press clippings, clothing, magazines and gifts. The government also recovered dozens of empty folders that carried classified markings.

==== Trump's response ====
Trump claimed he made a "standing order" to declassify all material brought to Mar-a-Lago, though there is no known documentation of the order, and no former Trump administration official defends Trump on this point. Only one former Trump administration official, Kash Patel, initially agreed with Trump's claim that such an order existed; later, however, Patel refused to answer most questions when he went under oath before the grand jury in October and it is unknown how he answered when he went under oath in November. Even had the information been declassified, it would have remained illegal for Trump to take and keep documents that belong to the government.

In a November 2, 2022 interview, a former Trump White House employee told the FBI that they had been unaware of any such standing order during Trump's presidency and that the first they heard of it was from 2022 media reports.

In a June 2023 FOIA response, both the Justice Department and the intelligence community said they could not find any standing order.

Despite not turning over all the requested material during his previous interactions with the government, Trump has said that the search warrant was unnecessary, claiming: "the government could have had whatever they wanted, if we had it."

==== Special master ====
Trump's legal team sued to request a "special master" whose review would identify any privileged material or material not covered by the search warrant to ensure that the Justice Department return that material to Trump. Federal judge Aileen Cannon granted Trump's request and appointed Raymond Dearie as special master, a person suggested by Trump's legal team. Dearie was required to complete his review by November 30, 2022, and Trump was required to pay the costs.

On September 21, 2022, the United States Court of Appeals for the 11th Circuit ruled that the Justice Department could resume using the classified documents and that neither Special Master Dearie nor Trump's team needed to review the documents with classification markings.

Early in the investigation, Trump informally suggested, without evidence, that the FBI planted classified documents taken during the search. Dearie asked Trump's team to certify (or formally dispute) the inventory and to state in court filings whether they believed the FBI had lied about what they seized. Trump's team objected that they wouldn't be able to meet the deadline. Dearie also asked Trump to identify which documents he believed were protected from disclosure to people outside the executive branch (like Congress) and which were protected from review within the executive branch. On September 29, 2022, Judge Cannon invalidated both of Dearie's requests. In the same decision, Cannon also extended Dearie's overall deadline to December 16, citing issues in finding a vendor to scan the 11,000 documents he was required to review.

On December 1, the U.S. Court of Appeals for the 11th Circuit in Atlanta overruled Judge Cannon's appointment of a special master. In its ruling, the court wrote: "We cannot write a rule that allows any subject of a search warrant to block government investigations after the execution of the warrant. Nor can we write a rule that allows only former presidents to do so." Trump did not appeal. On December 8, 2022, Dearie's review officially ended and the Justice Department regained the right to access the documents.

On December 12, 2022, Judge Cannon dismissed Trump's Mar-a-Lago lawsuit due to "lack of jurisdiction". This nullified Trump's request for access to the unredacted affidavit used to obtain the Mar-a-Lago search warrant.

=== Additional missing documents ===
Even after the Mar-a-Lago search, the Justice Department stated in court filings that it was still determining whether more government documents remained missing. The search of Mar-a-Lago had retrieved empty folders with classification markings, raising the question of whether Trump still had documents. In September 2022, Jay I. Bratt informed Trump's lawyers that the Justice Department believed Trump had still not returned all the government documents in his possession. NARA also informed Congress that Trump had still not turned over all presidential records.

In early December 2022, it was reported that Trump's attorneys had hired a search team to look for any classified material still in his possession, after being pressed by a federal judge to search more thoroughly for any remaining documents. Two documents with classified markings were found in a storage unit in West Palm Beach, Florida and were given to the FBI along with a laptop onto which they had been digitized. The storage unit had been arranged by the General Services Administration in coordination with Trump's team to store items from a North Virginia office that had been used by Trump's staffers. Three other locations were also searched — Trump Tower in New York, Trump's Bedminster Golf Club, and a Florida office — but no additional classified documents were found. Trump's lawyers said this satisfied the subpoena for classified documents issued six months earlier; the DOJ disagreed and asked DC District Chief Judge Beryl Howell to hold Trump in contempt of court. Though the court proceedings are officially sealed and not public, Judge Howell reportedly decided not to hold Trump in contempt of court, instead urging the Justice Department and Trump's team to resolve the matter of any remaining documents privately. Federal investigators reportedly suspect Trump had been playing a "shell game with classified documents", according to one of CNN's sources.

=== Court proceedings ===
On October 13, 2022, Kash Patel appeared before the grand jury. He chose to invoke his Fifth Amendment rights and refused to answer most questions. The Justice Department asked a federal judge to compel his testimony; the judge declined, saying the Justice Department would first have to promise him immunity. The Justice Department then gave Patel limited-use immunity, meaning he would lose the immunity if he lied under oath, and he testified on November 3.

On October 27, Trump's legal team and federal prosecutors came for a hearing at a federal courthouse in Washington, DC. The hearing was sealed, but it is known that it was at least partly related to whether all classified material in Trump's possession has been returned to the government. Previous court appearances by Trump's legal team had been in Florida; this was their first appearance in Washington, DC for this case. In late October, it was reported that the Justice Department had brought on federal prosecutor David Raskin. Raskin has worked on international counter-terrorism cases and, more recently, on the investigation of the January 6 attack, and he gradually began working on the Mar-a-Lago document case.

=== Special counsel investigation ===
On November 18, Attorney General Merrick Garland named Jack Smith as independent special counsel to lead the investigation of the classified material case, and to review Trump's role in the January 6 United States Capitol attack, with specific focus on any potential obstruction to the transfer of presidential power that may have occurred following the 2020 U.S. elections. In December, Smith and his team of 20 prosecutors filed subpoenas targeting Trump allies who worked at the local and state government levels during the 2020 elections in Georgia, New Mexico, Nevada, Michigan, Arizona, Pennsylvania and Wisconsin.

=== Indictment ===
On June 8, 2023, Trump was indicted on 37 counts related to the documents. This was the first time a former U.S. president was indicted on federal charges. On June 13, 2023, Trump was arrested, booked, and processed after surrendering himself into federal custody prior to his arraignment in the U.S. District Court of South Florida. Trump pleaded not guilty to all 37 charges. As part of the conditions for his release, Trump avoided paying bond, but was barred from discussing the case with witnesses and with Walt Nauta, his aide and co-defendant in the matter. On July 15, 2024, Judge Aileen Cannon annulled the entire procedure on the grounds that the appointment of special prosecutor Jack Smith was illegal.

== See also ==
- Joe Biden classified documents incident
- Mike Pence classified documents incident
- Donald J. Trump Presidential Library
