= Don Albert Pardee =

American judge (1837–1919)

Judge of the United States Court of Appeals for the Fifth Circuit
- In office June 16, 1891 – September 26, 1919
- Appointed by: operation of law
- Preceded by: Seat established by 26 Stat. 826
- Succeeded by: Alexander Campbell King

Judge of the United States Circuit Courts for the Fifth Circuit
- In office May 13, 1881 – December 31, 1911
- Appointed by: James A. Garfield
- Preceded by: William Burnham Woods
- Succeeded by: Seat abolished

Personal details
- Born: Don Albert Pardee; March 29, 1837 Wadsworth, Ohio, US
- Died: September 26, 1919 (aged 82) Atlanta, Georgia, US
- Party: Republican
- Education: read law

Military service
- Allegiance: United States
- Branch/service: United States Army; Union Army
- Years of service: 1861–1866
- Rank: Lieutenant Colonel; Bvt. Brigadier General
- Unit: 42nd Ohio Infantry Regiment
- Battles/wars: American Civil War

Don Albert Pardee (March 29, 1837 – September 26, 1919) was a United States circuit judge of the United States Court of Appeals for the Fifth Circuit and of the United States Circuit Courts for the Fifth Circuit.

== Education and career ==
Born on March 29, 1837, in Wadsworth, Ohio, Pardee read law in 1859. He entered private practice in Medina County, Ohio from 1859 to 1861. He served in the United States Army from 1861 to 1866, during the American Civil War. He resumed private practice in New Orleans, Louisiana from 1865 to 1868. He was a register in bankruptcy in New Orleans in 1867. He was a Judge for the Louisiana District Court for the Second Judicial District from 1868 to 1880. He was nominated by President Ulysses S. Grant to serve as a United States district judge of the United States District Court for the District of Louisiana on December 14, 1874, and March 9, 1875, however, the United States Senate did not vote on either nomination. He was a delegate to the Louisiana constitutional convention in 1879. He was the Republican Party candidate for Attorney General of Louisiana in 1879. He resumed private practice in New Orleans from 1880 to 1881. He was a member of The Boston Club of New Orleans.

== Federal judicial service ==
Pardee was nominated by President James A. Garfield on March 14, 1881, to a seat on the United States Circuit Courts for the Fifth Circuit vacated by Judge William Burnham Woods. He was confirmed by the United States Senate on May 13, 1881, and received his commission the same day. Pardee was assigned by operation of law to additional and concurrent service on the United States Court of Appeals for the Fifth Circuit on June 16, 1891, to a new seat authorized by 26 Stat. 826 (Evarts Act). On December 31, 1911, the Circuit Courts were abolished and he thereafter served only on the Court of Appeals. His service terminated on September 26, 1919, due to his death in Atlanta, Georgia. He was President Garfield's longest serving judicial appointee.

== See also ==
- List of United States federal judges by longevity of service

== Sources ==
Legal offices
Preceded by William Burnham Woods	Judge of the United States Circuit Courts for the Fifth Circuit; 1881–1911	Succeeded by Seat abolished
Preceded by Seat established by 26 Stat. 826	Judge of the United States Court of Appeals for the Fifth Circuit; 1891–1919	Succeeded by Alexander Campbell King
