= Special counsel =

US lawyer used to avoid a conflict of interest

In the United States, a special counsel (formerly called special prosecutor or independent counsel) is a lawyer appointed to investigate, and potentially prosecute, a particular case of suspected wrongdoing for which a conflict of interest exists for the usual prosecuting authority. Other jurisdictions have similar systems. Special prosecutors also have handled investigations into those connected to the government but not in a position of direct authority over the Justice Department's prosecutors, such as cabinet secretaries or election campaigns.

While the most prominent special prosecutors have been those appointed since the 1870s to investigate presidents and those connected to them, the term can also be used to refer to any prosecutor appointed to avoid a conflict of interest or appearance thereof. The concept originates in state law: "state courts have traditionally appointed special prosecutors when the regular government attorney was disqualified from a case, whether for incapacitation or interest."

Because district attorneys' offices work closely with police, some activists argue that cases of police misconduct at the state and local level should be handled by special prosecutors.

== Terminology ==
The terms special prosecutor, independent counsel, and special counsel have the same fundamental meaning, and their use (at least at the federal level in the U.S.) is generally differentiated by the time period to which they are being applied. The term 'special prosecutor' was used throughout the Watergate era, but was replaced by the less confrontational 'independent counsel' in the 1983 reauthorization of the Ethics in Government Act. Those appointed under that act after 1983 are generally referred to as 'independent counsels'. Since the independent counsel law expired in 1999, the term 'special counsel' has been used. This is the term used in the current U.S. government regulations concerning the appointment of special counsels, such as Title 28 CFR.

While the term 'special prosecutor' is sometimes used in historical discussions of such figures before 1983, the term 'special counsel' appears to have been frequently used as well, including, for example, in contemporary newspaper accounts describing the first presidentially-appointed special counsel in 1875.

== United States appointment at the federal level ==
=== Pre-Watergate ===
In 1875, Ulysses Grant appointed the first federal special prosecutor, John B. Henderson, to investigate the Whiskey Ring scandal. After attempting to stifle Henderson's investigation of the president's personal secretary, Grant fired Henderson on the grounds that Henderson's statements to a grand jury regarding Grant were impertinent. Following criticism, Grant appointed a new special prosecutor, James Broadhead, to continue the investigation.

In 1881, James Garfield appointed the next special prosecutor, William Cook, to investigate the Star Route scandal. Cook continued his investigation into the Chester Arthur administration.

From 1901 to 1909, during the Theodore Roosevelt administration, special prosecutors were appointed to investigate two scandals. In 1903, Roosevelt appointed two special prosecutors (a Democrat and a Republican) to investigate allegations of bribery at the Post Office Department. In 1905, Roosevelt's attorney general, Philander Knox, appointed Francis Heney as a special prosecutor to investigate the Oregon land fraud scandal.

In 1924, Calvin Coolidge appointed two special counsels from the two major parties of the time, Atlee Pomerene (a Democrat) and Owen Roberts (a Republican), to investigate the Teapot Dome scandal. This appointment was unique in that it was mandated under a special Congressional joint resolution, and was subject to approval in the Senate, similar to a cabinet appointment.

In 1952, Harry Truman appointed Newbold Morris as a "special assistant to the Attorney General" to investigate the corruption at the Bureau of Internal Revenue following Congressional pressure and calls for a special prosecutor. After Morris submitted a lengthy questionnaire on personal finances to be completed by all senior executive officers, he was fired by Attorney General Howard McGrath, who was in turn fired by the president. Following the appointment of a new attorney general, the investigation was continued through regular channels.

=== Watergate ===
Before his May 25, 1973 appointment as Richard Nixon's attorney general, Elliott Richardson had agreed at his Senate confirmation hearing to appoint a Watergate special prosecutor, and so immediately on taking office appointed Archibald Cox under a special one-time regulation. As part of his investigation, in July of that year, Cox first requested and then subpoenaed the Nixon White House tapes; secret recordings Nixon had made of conversations in the Oval Office and elsewhere. The Nixon administration refused to produce the tapes citing executive privilege, and the dispute was fought in court until October.

After a Court of Appeals instructed the president to comply with the special prosecutor's subpoena, Nixon ordered the special prosecutor fired. In a constitutional crisis that became known as the Saturday Night Massacre, both the attorney general and deputy attorney general (who had both made promises regarding the special prosecutor in their Senate confirmation hearings) resigned rather than carry out the order to fire Cox. Solicitor General Robert Bork, who was third in line at the Department of Justice, then fired Cox. Initially, the Nixon White House announced that the office of the special prosecutor had been abolished, but after public outcry Nixon instead had Bork appoint Leon Jaworski as the second Watergate special prosecutor. The firing was ruled illegal in the case of Nader v. Bork, but, as a new special prosecutor had already been appointed, the case was already moot when decided, and the decision was never appealed past the district court.

Jaworski continued Cox's pursuit of the White House tapes, but Nixon resisted. He raised separation of powers questions under the U.S. Constitution. Since the special counsel is a member of the executive branch, Nixon argued that the special counsel is ultimately answerable to the president and that the president could not be compelled by a subpoena issued by his own subordinate. The tapes were ultimately released following the Supreme Court decision in United States v. Nixon. Nixon resigned the presidency on August 9, 1974, and Jaworski resigned about two and a half months later, to be replaced by his (and Cox's) deputy, Henry Ruth Jr.—who in turn resigned in 1975, leaving Charles Ruff the fourth and final Watergate special prosecutor.

Acting under his existing appointment as Watergate special prosecutor, Ruff conducted an unrelated investigation into whether Gerald Ford had misused campaign funds while a congressman, clearing the new president of any wrongdoing.

=== Ethics in Government Act ===
Inspired in part by Watergate, in 1978 Congress passed the Ethics in Government Act. Title VI of this act was known as the Special Prosecutor Act and later renamed the Independent Counsel Act, which established formal rules for the appointment of a special prosecutor. The appointment of special prosecutors varied in important ways from appointments made before and since. Majorities of either party within the House or Senate Judiciary Committee could formally request the attorney general to appoint a special prosecutor on a particular matter, but the decision of whether or not to appoint the independent counsel remained with the attorney general and was not reviewable in court. If the attorney general decided not to appoint an independent counsel in response to such a request, they were only required to respond in writing with the reasons. Although the decision to appoint a special prosecutor was still made by the attorney general, the actual selection of the special prosecutor was made by a three-judge panel called the Special Division, selected from the Courts of Appeals. The law did not allow special prosecutors to be removed except under specific circumstances such as wrongdoing or incapacitation. The special prosecutor provisions in the bill were temporary but were reauthorized by Congress in 1983 and 1987, expiring five years later in 1992; they were reinstated for another five years in 1994 before expiring again in 1999. The constitutionality of the law was affirmed by a 7–1 decision of the Supreme Court in the case of Morrison v. Olson.

Roughly twenty special prosecutors (called independent counsels after 1983) were appointed under the Ethics in Government Act and its reauthorizations during the Jimmy Carter, Ronald Reagan, George H. W. Bush, and Bill Clinton administrations. These include significant investigations into the Iran–Contra affair and the Whitewater controversy, the latter of which ultimately led to the impeachment of Bill Clinton over the Clinton–Lewinsky scandal. Numerous smaller investigations into cabinet secretaries for relatively minor offenses, such as drug use, were also carried out by independent counsels during this period.

During the period 1992–1994 when the independent counsel provisions were not in force, Attorney General Janet Reno appointed Robert Fiske special counsel to investigate the Whitewater controversy. When the law was reauthorized in 1994, Reno invoked it to order an independent counsel be appointed to investigate Whitewater, and suggested Fiske continue in that role. Instead, Ken Starr was given the job by the three-judge panel. Starr resigned and was replaced by Robert Ray in 1999 just before the expiration of the independent counsel statute. Ray formally concluded the Whitewater investigation in 2003.

=== Current regulations ===
Since the expiration of the independent counsel statute in 1999, there has been no federal statutory law governing the appointment of a special counsel. Upon the law's expiration in 1999, the Justice Department, under Attorney General Janet Reno, promulgated procedural regulations governing the appointment of special counsels.

In 1999, these regulations were used by Reno to appoint John Danforth special counsel to investigate the FBI's handling of the Waco siege.

In 2003, during the George W. Bush administration, Patrick Fitzgerald was appointed special counsel to investigate the Plame affair by Deputy Attorney General James Comey after the recusal of Attorney General John Ashcroft.

On May 17, 2017, former FBI Director Robert Mueller was appointed special counsel to take over the previous FBI investigation of Russian interference in the 2016 presidential election by Deputy Attorney General Rod Rosenstein after the recusal of Attorney General Jeff Sessions.

In December 2020, Attorney General William Barr revealed to Congress that John Durham's investigation had been granted special counsel status on October 19.

On November 18, 2022, Attorney General Garland named Jack Smith special counsel to investigate Donald Trump's actions regarding the January 6 United States Capitol attack and handling of classified documents.

On January 12, 2023, Garland appointed Robert Hur special counsel to investigate Joe Biden's storage of classified materials.

On August 11, 2023 Merrick Garland appointed David C. Weiss special counsel to investigate Joe Biden's son Hunter Biden stemming from nearly five years of federal investigations into felony tax evasion, illegal foreign lobbying, money laundering, and other possible crimes. This development came shortly after Republicans alleged that Hunter received a "sweetheart" deal in Delaware where he was facing several criminal charges relates to tax evasion and firearm offenses.

==== Constitutionality ====
On 15 July 2024, federal judge Aileen Cannon, in a 93-page ruling, ruled that Jack Smith's appointment and funding were both unconstitutional under Article I, Section 9, Clause 7, of the US Constitution, which prohibits appropriations except when authorized by law. She also ruled that it was disallowed by Article II Section 2 Clause 2, which requires principal officers to be appointed by the President and confirmed by the Senate. Therefore, she dismissed the classified documents case that a grand jury under Smith had brought against former president Donald Trump. Smith's office announced that it would appeal the ruling to the United States Court of Appeals for the Eleventh Circuit. However, his appeal was dismissed following the 2024 presidential election.

Cannon's ruling adopted the arguments on this issue made by Supreme Court associate justice Clarence Thomas in his concurrence in the Trump v. United States case decided two weeks earlier.

The 1988 Supreme Court case Morrison v. Olson had upheld appointment of special counsels, calling them "inferior officers" and not "officers". Cannon discussed that case, however, arguing that it no longer had any applicability, on the grounds that it concerned special counsels appointed under the special statutory authority of the Independent Counsels Act, which law Congress had since allowed to expire, and hence Smith's appointment was not made under it.

== Legal authority ==
In 1999, the Department of Justice under Attorney General Janet Reno promulgated regulations for the future appointment of special counsels. As of 2018, these regulations remain in effect in the Code of Federal Regulations, Title 28, part 600 (28 CFR §600). The regulations restrict the power to fire the special counsel into the hands of the attorney general alone, and they forbid the firing of the special counsel without good cause. They are internal Department of Justice regulations deriving their power from various acts of Congress, codified at U.S. Code, Title 28, section 510 and 515 (28 U.S.C. 510 and 515). Congress has the power to directly limit the firing of special prosecutors or to delegate that power to the Attorney General. An agency regulation promulgated within the authority granted by statute has the force and effect of law, is binding upon the body that issues it, and can not be arbitrarily revoked.

The existence of a law or regulations specifying the process to appoint a special counsel has not stopped the attorney general (or acting attorney general) from using their statutory authority to appoint a special counsel by other means, as has happened twice. Despite the passage of the Ethics in Government Act the previous year, Paul Curran was appointed to investigate Jimmy Carter's peanut business in 1979 under the attorney general's statutory authority (and was selected by him rather than by a three-judge panel as under the law), ostensibly because the alleged wrongdoing preceded the passage of the act. Patrick Fitzgerald's appointment as special counsel in 2003 was specifically not made under the 28 CFR 600 regulation. The special counsel regulations specify that a special counsel must be a lawyer from outside the US government, while Fitzgerald was already a federal prosecutor at the time of his appointment.

=== Initiating a special counsel investigation ===
The decision to appoint a special counsel rests with the attorney general (or acting attorney general). The current special counsel regulations specify that:

The Attorney General, or in cases in which the Attorney General is recused, the Acting Attorney General, will appoint a Special Counsel when he or she determines that criminal investigation of a person or matter is warranted and—

- (a) That investigation or prosecution of that person or matter by a United States Attorney's Office or litigating Division of the Department of Justice would present a conflict of interest for the Department or other extraordinary circumstances; and
- (b) That under the circumstances, it would be in the public interest to appoint an outside Special Counsel to assume responsibility for the matter.

The attorney general sets the subject jurisdiction of the special counsel:

The jurisdiction of a Special Counsel shall be established by the Attorney General. The Special Counsel will be provided with a specific factual statement of the matter to be investigated. The jurisdiction of a Special Counsel shall also include the authority to investigate and prosecute federal crimes committed in the course of, and with intent to interfere with, the Special Counsel's investigation, such as perjury, obstruction of justice, destruction of evidence, and intimidation of witnesses; and to conduct appeals arising out of the matter being investigated and/or prosecuted.

The choice of whom to appoint is to be made by the attorney general with the following guidelines:

An individual named as Special Counsel shall be a lawyer with a reputation for integrity and impartial decisionmaking, and with appropriate experience to ensure both that the investigation will be conducted ably, expeditiously and thoroughly, and that investigative and prosecutorial decisions will be supported by an informed understanding of the criminal law and Department of Justice policies. The Special Counsel shall be selected from outside the United States Government. Special Counsels shall agree that their responsibilities as Special Counsel shall take first precedence in their professional lives, and that it may be necessary to devote their full time to the investigation, depending on its complexity and the stage of the investigation.

=== Terminating a special counsel investigation ===
Generally, the special counsel him or herself decides when an investigation will terminate, with or without formal charges being pursued. The special counsel typically issues a final report on their investigation at this time. The current special counsel regulations specify that "At the conclusion of the Special Counsel's work, he or she shall provide the Attorney General with a confidential report explaining the prosecution or declination decisions reached by the Special Counsel."

==== Firing the special counsel ====
The current special counsel regulations specify that:

The Special Counsel may be disciplined or removed from office only by the personal action of the Attorney General. The Attorney General may remove a Special Counsel for misconduct, dereliction of duty, incapacity, conflict of interest, or for other good cause, including violation of Departmental policies. The Attorney General shall inform the Special Counsel in writing of the specific reason for their removal.

=== Role of the legislative and judicial branches ===
Since the expiration of the independent counsel provisions in the Ethics in Government Act in 1999, as was the case before 1978, neither Congress nor the courts have any official role in the appointment of a special counsel; however, Congress can use other powers to pressure an administration into appointing a special counsel. This happened, for example, in the appointment of Watergate special prosecutor Archibald Cox; senators secured a promise from Attorney General nominee Richardson to appoint a Watergate special prosecutor as a condition of his confirmation. Congress also has independent authority to investigate the president and their close associates through Congressional hearings as part of its government oversight role.

== At the state level ==
Special prosecutors are appointed in state court with greater frequency than federal, and most often in cases where a conflict of interest arises or to avoid even the appearance such a conflict exists. In local state governments, special prosecutors are appointed by a judge, government official, organization, company or group of citizens to prosecute violations of law committed by one or more governmental agents and procure indictments for actions taken under color of state law. Unlike in courts having federal jurisdiction, where the terms "special counsel" and "independent counsel" have a uniform definition, in state court meanings of legal terms continually vary, but with "special prosecutor" referencing the appointment of an attorney (supra) in contemplation of representation and prosecution of one or more government agent(s) for unlawful conduct.

== See also ==
- United States Department of Justice Office of Special Counsel
