= John R. Lausch Jr. =

American attorney (born 1970)

John Lausch
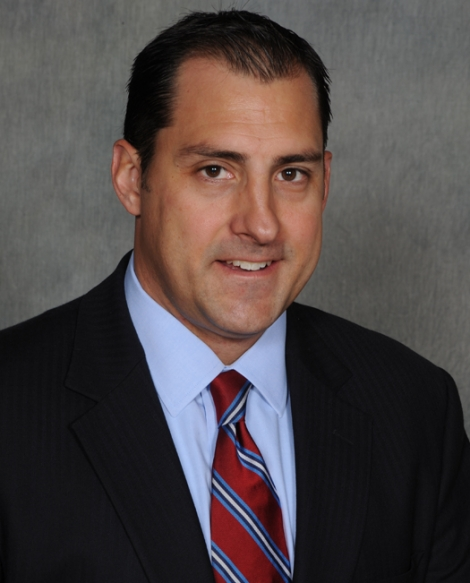

United States Attorney for the Northern District of Illinois
- In office November 22, 2017 – March 11, 2023
- President: Donald Trump; Joe Biden
- Preceded by: Zachary T. Fardon
- Succeeded by: Morris Pasqual (acting)

Personal details
- Born: 1970 (age 55–56) Joliet, Illinois, U.S.
- Education: Harvard University (BA); Northwestern University (JD)

John R. Lausch Jr. (born 1970) is an American attorney who served as the United States attorney for the Northern District of Illinois from 2017 to 2023. Previously, he served as an Assistant United States Attorney in the Northern District of Illinois from 1999 to 2010. During his time in the U.S. Attorney's Office, he served as a Deputy Chief in the Narcotics and Gangs Section for several years, where he helped lead the District's Anti-Gang and Project Safe Neighborhoods programs.

== Education and early legal career ==
Lausch graduated from Joliet Catholic High School, in Joliet, Illinois, in 1988. Lausch received his Bachelor of Arts, cum laude, from Harvard University and his Juris Doctor, cum laude, from Northwestern University School of Law. He clerked for Michael Stephen Kanne of the United States Court of Appeals for the Seventh Circuit.

=== United States attorney ===
On August 3, 2017, he was nominated to be the United States attorney for the Northern District of Illinois by President Donald Trump. On October 19, 2017, his nomination was reported out of committee by voice vote. On November 9, 2017, his nomination was approved by the United States Senate by voice vote. He was sworn into office on November 22, 2017. Both senators from Illinois, Dick Durbin and Tammy Duckworth released a joint statement that Lausch should remain in office in the new administration to complete sensitive investigations. On February 8, 2021, unlike 55 other Trump-era attorneys, he was not asked to resign. On March 2, 2023, he announced his resignation effective March 11 of the same year.
