= Gang of Eight (intelligence) =

Congressional members privy to intelligence briefings

The Gang of Eight is a colloquial term for a set of eight leaders within the United States Congress who are, according to law, briefed on classified intelligence matters by the executive branch. Specifically, the Gang of Eight includes the leaders of each of the two parties from both the Senate and House of Representatives, and the chairs and ranking minority members of both the Senate Committee and House Committee for intelligence as set forth by 50 U.S.C. § 3093(c)(2).

Under normal conditions, the president of the United States is required by Title 50 U.S.C. § 3091(a)(1) to "ensure that the congressional intelligence committees are kept fully and currently informed of the intelligence activities of the United States, including any significant anticipated intelligence activity as required by [the] title". However, under "extraordinary circumstances", when the president thinks "it is essential to limit access" to information about a covert action, 50 U.S.C. § 3093(c)(2) allows the president to limit reporting.

== Background ==
The term "Gang of Eight" gained wide use in coverage of the controversial warrantless surveillance of American citizens by the National Security Agency under the George W. Bush administration, in the context that no members of Congress other than the Gang of Eight were informed of the program, and they were forbidden to disseminate knowledge of the program to other members of Congress. The Bush administration asserted that the briefings delivered to the Gang of Eight sufficed to provide Congressional oversight of the program and preserve the checks and balances between the executive and legislative branches.

The non-partisan Congressional Research Service prepared a legal analysis on January 18, 2006 that noted: "If the NSA surveillance program were to be considered an intelligence collection program, limiting congressional notification of the NSA program to the Gang of Eight, which some Members who were briefed about the program contend, would appear to be inconsistent with the law, which requires that the 'congressional intelligence committees be kept fully and currently informed of all intelligence activities', other than those involving covert actions."

However, as noted by David S. Kris, former Assistant Attorney General for National Security at DOJ: "As it turns out, however, Rep. Jerry Nadler was in fact aware of the bulk metadata collection in 2009, and (as discussed in the text) wrote to the Department of Justice about the collection at the time. In response, DOJ sent him a letter in December 2009 noting that the government was making available to all Members of Congress information about the bulk collection and compliance issues that had arisen." In 2011, as it did in 2009, the Executive Branch again made documentation available to all members of Congress to explain reauthorization of Section 215 of the PATRIOT Act.

Senator Dianne Feinstein stressed in July 2013, "I know of no federal program for which audits, Congressional oversight and scrutiny by the Justice Department, the Intelligence Community and the Courts are stronger or more sustained."

Former Attorney General Alberto Gonzales repeatedly made references to the "Gang of Eight" when being questioned about the warrantless surveillance/domestic spying while testifying at the Justice Department Oversight hearing held July 24, 2007.

== Members, 119th Congress ==
Under the "gang of eight" system, the executive branch of the United States discloses highly sensitive intelligence information to the following members of Congress:

- United States House Permanent Select Committee on Intelligence:
  - Rick Crawford (R-AR), Chair
  - Jim Himes (D-CT), Ranking Member
- United States Senate Select Committee on Intelligence:
  - Tom Cotton (R-AR), Chair
  - Mark Warner (D-VA), Vice Chair
- Leadership in the United States House of Representatives:
  - Mike Johnson (R-LA), Speaker
  - Hakeem Jeffries (D-NY), Minority Leader
- Leadership in the United States Senate:
  - John Thune (R-SD), Majority Leader
  - Chuck Schumer (D-NY), Minority Leader

== Members from past Congresses ==
118th United States Congress (January 3, 2023 – January 3, 2025)

- United States House Permanent Select Committee on Intelligence:
  - Mike Turner (R-OH), Chair
  - Jim Himes (D-CT), Ranking Member
- United States Senate Select Committee on Intelligence:
  - Mark Warner (D-VA), Chair
  - Marco Rubio (R-FL), Vice Chair
- Leadership in the United States House of Representatives:
  - Kevin McCarthy (R-CA), Speaker of the House (January 7, 2023 – October 3, 2023)
  - Mike Johnson (R-LA), Speaker of the House (from October 25, 2023)
  - Hakeem Jeffries (D-NY), Minority Leader
- Leadership in the United States Senate:
  - Chuck Schumer (D-NY), Majority Leader
  - Mitch McConnell (R-KY), Minority Leader

117th United States Congress (January 3, 2021 – January 3, 2023)

- United States House Permanent Select Committee on Intelligence:
  - Adam Schiff (D-CA), Chair
  - Devin Nunes (R-CA), Ranking member (2021)
  - Mike Turner (R-OH), Ranking member (2022)
- United States Senate Select Committee on Intelligence:
  - Mark Warner (D-VA), Chair
  - Marco Rubio (R-FL), Vice Chair
- Leadership in the United States House of Representatives:
  - Nancy Pelosi (D-CA), Speaker of the House
  - Kevin McCarthy (R-CA), Minority leader
- Leadership in the United States Senate:
  - Chuck Schumer (D-NY), Majority Leader
  - Mitch McConnell (R-KY), Minority Leader

116th United States Congress (January 3, 2019 – January 3, 2021)

- United States House Permanent Select Committee on Intelligence:
  - Adam Schiff (D-CA), Chair
  - Devin Nunes (R-CA), Ranking member
- United States Senate Select Committee on Intelligence:
  - Richard Burr (R-NC), Chair
  - Mark Warner (D-VA), Ranking member
- Leadership in the United States House of Representatives:
  - Nancy Pelosi (D-CA), Speaker of the House
  - Kevin McCarthy (R-CA), Minority leader
- Leadership in the United States Senate:
  - Mitch McConnell (R-KY), Majority Leader
  - Chuck Schumer (D-NY), Minority Leader

115th United States Congress (January 3, 2017 – January 3, 2019)

- United States House Permanent Select Committee on Intelligence:
  - Devin Nunes (R-CA), Chair
  - Adam Schiff (D-CA), Ranking member
- United States Senate Select Committee on Intelligence:
  - Richard Burr (R-NC), Chair
  - Mark Warner (D-VA), Ranking member
- Leadership in the United States House of Representatives:
  - Paul Ryan (R-WI), Speaker
  - Nancy Pelosi (D-CA), Minority leader
- Leadership in the United States Senate:
  - Mitch McConnell (R-KY), Majority Leader
  - Chuck Schumer (D-NY), Minority Leader

114th United States Congress (January 3, 2015 – January 3, 2017)

- United States House Permanent Select Committee on Intelligence:

- Devin Nunes (R): (Chair)
- Adam Schiff (D): (Ranking member)

- United States Senate Select Committee on Intelligence:

- Richard Burr (R): (Chair)
- Dianne Feinstein (D): (Vice Chairman)

- Leadership in the United States House of Representatives:

- Paul Ryan (R): (Speaker of the House)
- Nancy Pelosi (D): (Minority leader)

- Leadership in the United States Senate:

- Mitch McConnell (R): (Majority leader)
- Harry Reid (D): (Minority leader)

== See also ==
- United States Senate Majority Leader
- United States Senate Minority Leader
- Speaker of the United States House of Representatives
- Minority Leader of the United States House of Representatives
- U.S. Senate Select Committee on Intelligence
- U.S. House Permanent Select Committee on Intelligence
