= McRaven =

McRaven is a surname whose bearers include:

- Claude C. McRaven (1918–2007), United States Air Force colonel and football player
- William H. McRaven (born 1955), United States Navy four-star admiral (retired), former Commander of U.S. Special Operations
- Dale McRaven (1939–2022), American screenwriter and producer, creator of sitcoms Angie and Perfect Strangers

== See also ==
- McRaven House, 18th century home in Vicksburg, Mississippi
