= Master of Homeland Security =

The Master of Homeland Security is an advanced academic degree program that covers both Masters of Arts and Masters of Science degree programs. These programs generally require a minimum of 18 to 24 months of graduate level instruction to complete. The minimum enrollment requirement is a bachelor's degree (BA or BS) from an accredited college or university. Successful degree completion is in most cases contingent upon a final thesis presentation. Some institutions publish the masters theses in Homeland Security and publicly archive the documents for use as emerging subject matter research material.

== Rise of degrees ==
Degrees in homeland security were created or altered shortly after the events of September 11, 2001. The Center for Homeland Defense and Security (CHDS) was established in April 2002. CHDS offers its own Masters program and other programs at various levels. The CHDS Masters program was first offered in 2003. CHDS also has created partnerships with many private institutions of higher learning.

Robert W. Smith points out that many Homeland Security courses also function largely as Emergency Management courses, and often were adapted from existing Emergency Management courses. However, many of these emerging degree programs are more than just an outgrowth of Emergency Management. The aforementioned CHDS database lists several such offerings that have emerged from within Public Administration and Criminal Justice degree programs.

Pursuit of these specialized degrees in Homeland Security was on the rise in 2006. However, John Fass Morton points out (quoting a 2010 article in Homeland Security Affairs) that the CHDS program is not available to private-sector attendees—its enrollment is Congressionally limited to government employees.

== Nature and utility of degree programs ==
Obtaining a Master of Homeland Security can enhance career paths in the areas of Homeland Security and Homeland Defense. Students enroll into a concentration of core courses and subsequently choose from a variety of electives in order to complete 36-credit hours of study towards a degree. The Masters of Arts degree curriculum follows standard educational norms demonstrating broader scope and taking a more general and theoretical approach. The Masters of Science degrees focus on development of technical skills that are germane to the application of the discipline.

== Availability of degree programs ==
The Federal Emergency Management Agency (FEMA) maintains an online list of programs in Homeland Security and related fields. An online database of institutions offering degrees in Homeland Security is maintained and published by the Center for Homeland Defense and Security (CHDS) at the Naval Post Graduate School (NPS) located in Monterey, California. The database indicates that there are more than 309 offerings across the United States having a direct nexus to Homeland Security advanced studies. As of September 2013, the database identifies 112 Master's degree programs and 12 Doctoral Degree programs in Homeland Security, Emergency Management, Emergency Preparedness, Terrorism, or Cyber Security. It does not list totals for Homeland Security as a separate category. As of September 2013, the FEMA list shows 26 Masters-level and 5 Doctorate-level programs specifically in Homeland Security
