= List of Murray State Racers in the NFL draft =

This is a list of Murray State Racers football players in the NFL draft.

== Key ==
B	Back	K	Kicker	NT	Nose tackle
C	Center	LB	Linebacker	FB	Fullback
DB	Defensive back	P	Punter	HB	Halfback
DE	Defensive end	QB	Quarterback	WR	Wide receiver
DT	Defensive tackle	RB	Running back	G	Guard
E	End	T	Offensive tackle	TE	Tight end

== Selections ==
Year	Round	Pick	Overall	Player	Team	Position
1941	13	4	114	Bill McMurray	Cleveland Rams	E
1941	18	4	164	Cobbie Lee	Cleveland Rams	B
1942	18	5	165	George Speth	Detroit Lions	T
1944	8	7	72	Cliff White	Washington Redskins	T
1950	20	12	260	John Hackney	Cleveland Browns	G
1952	20	8	237	Gil Mains	Detroit Lions	T
1954	29	10	347	Ted Dunn	San Francisco 49ers	B
1957	17	11	204	Don Heine	Chicago Bears	E
1958	19	12	229	Dave Bottos	Detroit Lions	B
1962	19	8	260	Bob Burton	San Francisco 49ers	T
1973	16	22	412	George Greenfield	Cleveland Browns	RB
1975	15	14	378	Don Clayton	New England Patriots	RB
1983	10	1	252	Ronald Hopkins	Baltimore Colts	DB
1985	6	14	154	Keith Lester	Cincinnati Bengals	TE
1988	11	3	280	Paul Hickert	Cincinnati Bengals	K
1990	10	13	261	Eric Crigler	Cincinnati Bengals	T
1997	6	8	171	Mike Cherry	New York Giants	QB
2010	5	22	153	Austen Lane	Jacksonville Jaguars	DE
2014	6	20	196	Walt Powell	Arizona Cardinals	WR
2019	3	34	98	Quincy Williams	Jacksonville Jaguars	LB

== Notable undrafted players ==
Note: No drafts held before 1936

Debut year	Player name	Position	Debut NFL/AFL team	Notes
1939	Claude C. McRaven	WB/DB	Cleveland Rams	—
1940	Pete Gudauskas^{†}	G	Cleveland Rams	NFL Champion (1943)
1985	Dan Coleman	DE	Washington Redskins	—
1986	Jim Yarbrough	DB	Denver Broncos	—
1990	Michael Proctor	QB	New England Patriots	—
1993	Melvin Aldridge	LB/DB	Houston Oilers	—
1996	Derrick Cullors	RB	New England Patriots	—
1998	Reggie Swinton	WR/RS	Jacksonville Jaguars	—
2003	Shane Andrus	PK	Indianapolis Colts	—
2005	Laroni Gallishaw	DB	Minnesota Vikings	—
2008	Rod Harper^{†}	WR	Green Bay Packers	Super Bowl Champion (XLIV)
2010	Derrick Townsel	WR	Jacksonville Jaguars	—
2011	Marcus Harris	WR	Detroit Lions	—
2019	Drew Anderson	QB	Arizona Cardinals	—
