= William H. McRaven =

United States Navy admiral (born 1955)

William McRaven
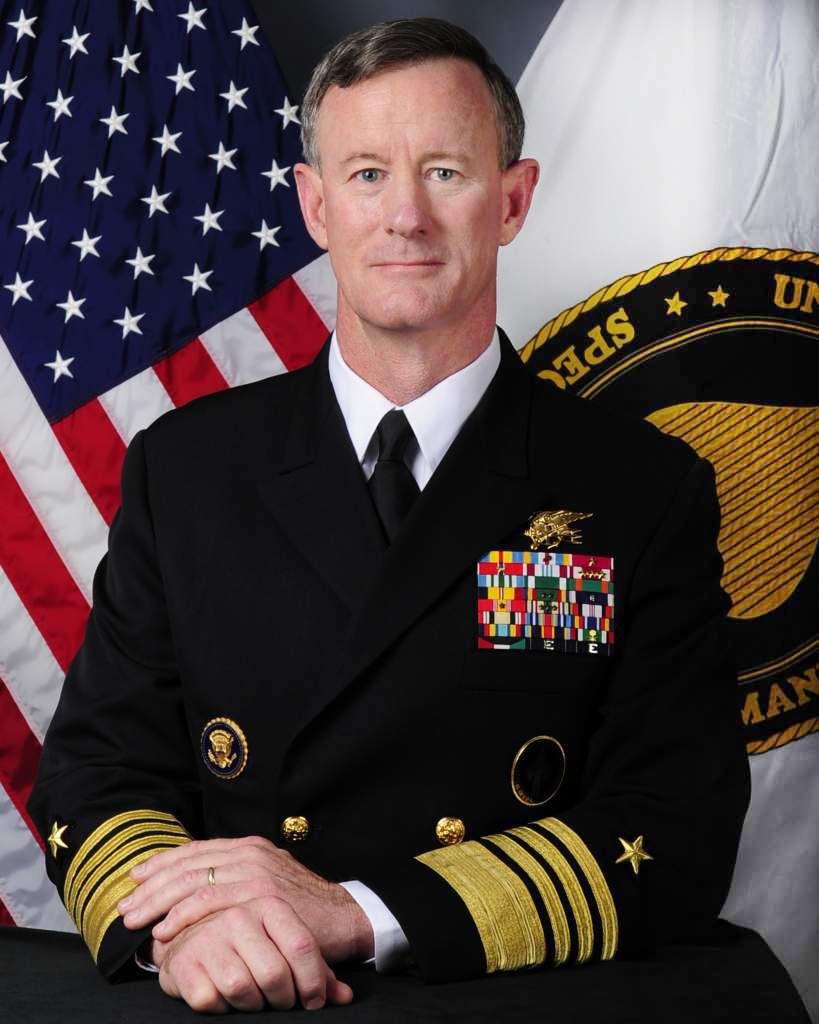
- Official portrait, 2012

11th Chancellor of the University of Texas System
- In office January 5, 2015 – May 31, 2018
- Preceded by: Francisco G. Cigarroa
- Succeeded by: James B. Milliken

9th Commander of the United States Special Operations Command
- In office August 8, 2011 – August 28, 2014
- President: Barack Obama
- Deputy: David P. Fridovich; John F. Mulholland Jr.
- Preceded by: Eric T. Olson
- Succeeded by: Joseph Votel

Personal details
- Born: William Harry McRaven; November 6, 1955 (age 70) Pinehurst, North Carolina, U.S.
- Spouse: Georgeann Brady (m. 1978)
- Children: 3
- Education: University of Texas, Austin (BA); Naval Postgraduate School (MS)

Military service
- Allegiance: United States
- Branch/service: United States Navy
- Years of service: 1977–2014
- Rank: Admiral
- Unit: SEAL Team Six
- Commands: U.S. Special Operations Command; Joint Special Operations Command; Special Operations Command Europe; Naval Special Warfare Group 1; SEAL Team 3
- Battles/wars: Persian Gulf War; • Operation Desert Shield; • Operation Desert Storm; War on terror; • Operation Enduring Freedom; • Operation Neptune Spear; War in Afghanistan; Iraq War
- Awards: Defense Distinguished Service Medal (3); Defense Superior Service Medal (2); Legion of Merit (2); Bronze Star (2)

William Harry McRaven (born November 6, 1955) is a retired United States Navy four-star admiral who served as the ninth commander of the United States Special Operations Command (SOCOM) from August 8, 2011 to August 28, 2014. From 2015 to 2018, he was the chancellor of The University of Texas System.

McRaven served from June 13, 2008 to August 2011 as commander of Joint Special Operations Command (JSOC) and from June 2006 to March 2008 as commander of Special Operations Command Europe (SOCEUR). In addition to his duties as COMSOCEUR, he was designated as the first director of the NATO Special Operations Forces Coordination Center (NSCC), where he was charged with enhancing the capabilities and inter-operability of all NATO Special Operations Forces. McRaven retired from the U.S. Navy on September 1, 2014, after more than 37 years of service.

McRaven was reportedly considered by President Joe Biden for appointment as Secretary of Defense before Biden nominated Lloyd Austin.

== Early life ==
McRaven was born in Pinehurst, North Carolina. He is the son of Anna Elizabeth (Long) and Col. Claude C. McRaven, a Spitfire fighter pilot in World War II who played briefly in the NFL, and has two older sisters. His father, a career Air Force officer, was stationed at Pope Air Force Base, now known as Pope Field and part of Fort Bragg. His family moved to Texas while he was in elementary school and settled in San Antonio. McRaven attended Theodore Roosevelt High School where he took part in track.

McRaven attended the University of Texas at Austin where he was a walk-on member of the track team, and was a member of the Naval Reserve Officers Training Corps. He graduated in 1977 with a bachelor's degree in journalism, and was named a Distinguished Alumnus in 2012. McRaven holds a master's degree from the Naval Postgraduate School, where he helped establish and was the first graduate from the Special operations/Low intensity conflict curriculum.

== Naval career ==
=== Special operations ===
After graduating from the University of Texas at Austin, McRaven was commissioned as an officer (Ensign) in the U.S. Navy and volunteered for Basic Underwater Demolition/SEAL training (BUD/S). After six months of training, McRaven graduated with BUD/S class 95 in January 1978. Following completion of a six-month probationary period, he received the 1130 designator as a Naval Special Warfare Officer, entitled to wear the Special Warfare insignia. As a Navy SEAL officer, McRaven was deployed to the Philippines with Naval Special Warfare Unit One in 1979 and 1981. In 1982, as a junior officer, McRaven received assignment to SEAL Team Six in Dam Neck, Virginia under the command of CDR Richard Marcinko and completed a specialized selection and training course. McRaven served as assault team leader of blue squadron but was relieved of duty in 1983 due to McRaven's concerns about military discipline, and difficulties in keeping his sailors in line at the command. Richard Marcinko fired the 27-year-old McRaven in 1983. "He was a bright guy, but he didn't like my rude and crude way," Marcinko said. "If I was a loose cannon, he was too rigid. He took the special out of special warfare." McRaven was transferred to another east coast based SEAL team.

McRaven served numerous staff and command assignments within the special operations community, including platoon commander at Underwater Demolition Team 21/SEAL Team Four, squadron commander at Naval Special Warfare Development Group, executive officer of SEAL Team ONE, task unit commander during the Persian Gulf War, task group commander in the CENTCOM area of responsibility, commanding officer of SEAL Team THREE from 1994 to 1996, deputy commander for operations at JSOC, commanding officer of Naval Special Warfare Group ONE from 1999 to 2001. In early 2001 McRaven suffered a broken pelvis in a parachute accident during a training exercise. McRaven earned a Master of Arts degree at the Naval Postgraduate School in 1993. McRaven's thesis was entitled "The Theory of Special Operations" (republished in 1995 as Spec Ops: Case Studies in Special Operations Warfare: Theory and Practice).

McRaven later served as a staff officer with an interagency coordination concentration, including as the director for Strategic Planning in the Office of Combating Terrorism on the National Security Council Staff, assessment director at U.S. Special Operations Command, on the Staff of the Chief of Naval Operations and the chief of staff at Naval Special Warfare Group 1.

McRaven was the deputy to General Stanley A. McChrystal and later leader of a battle group targeting Al Qaeda in Iraq called 'Task Force 714', which proved to be innovative and highly successful. After McRaven took command of JSOC in 2008 he was prompted to request that a unit be stood up to deal with engaging female Afghans on different special operations in Afghanistan. These teams would be called Cultural Support Teams, or CSTs.

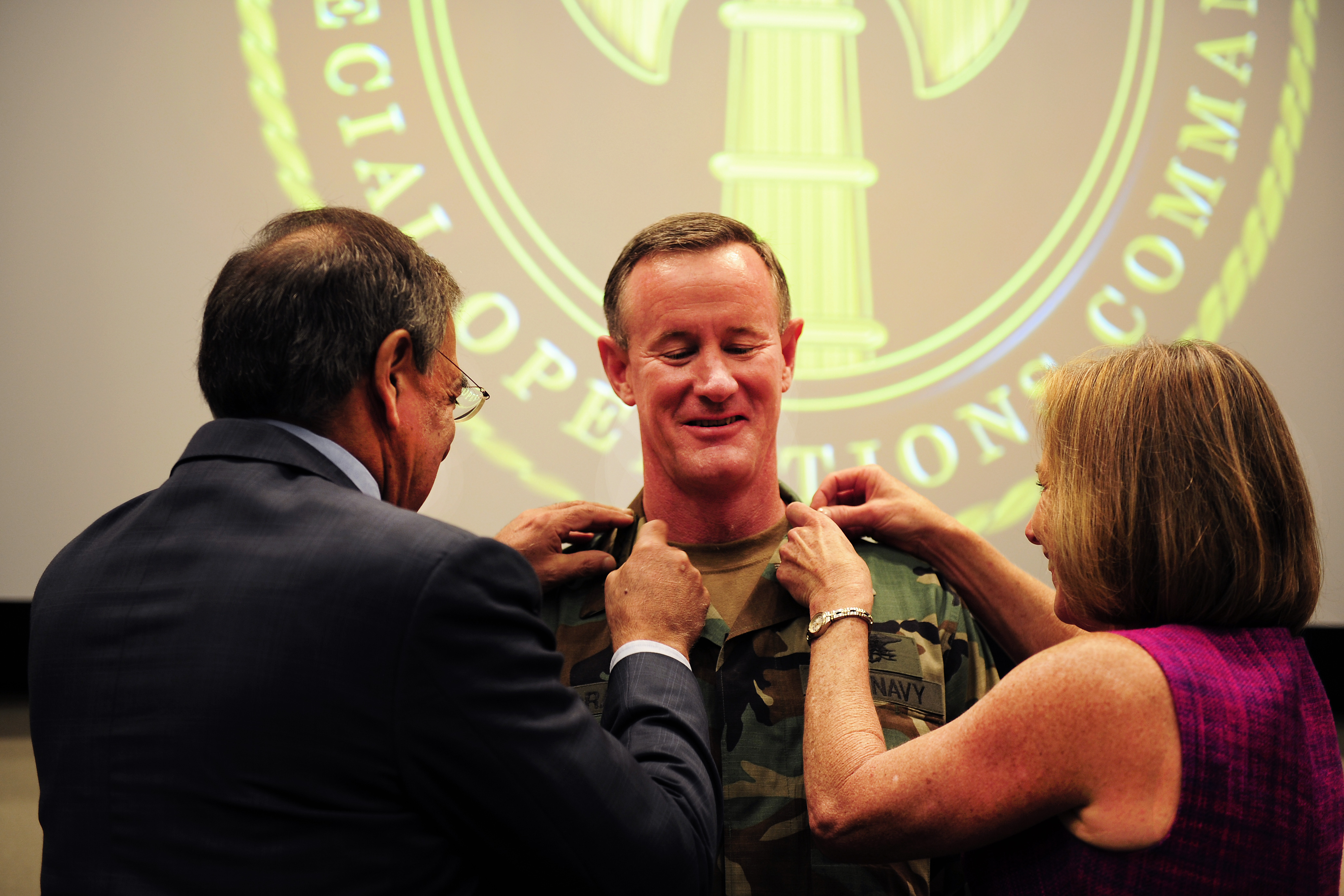
Georgeann Brady McRaven, McRaven's wife, and Defense Secretary Leon E. Panetta affix Navy Adm. William H. McRaven's new rank as a four-Star admiral at a U.S. Special Operations Command ceremony at MacDill Air Force Base, in Tampa, Florida, August 8, 2011

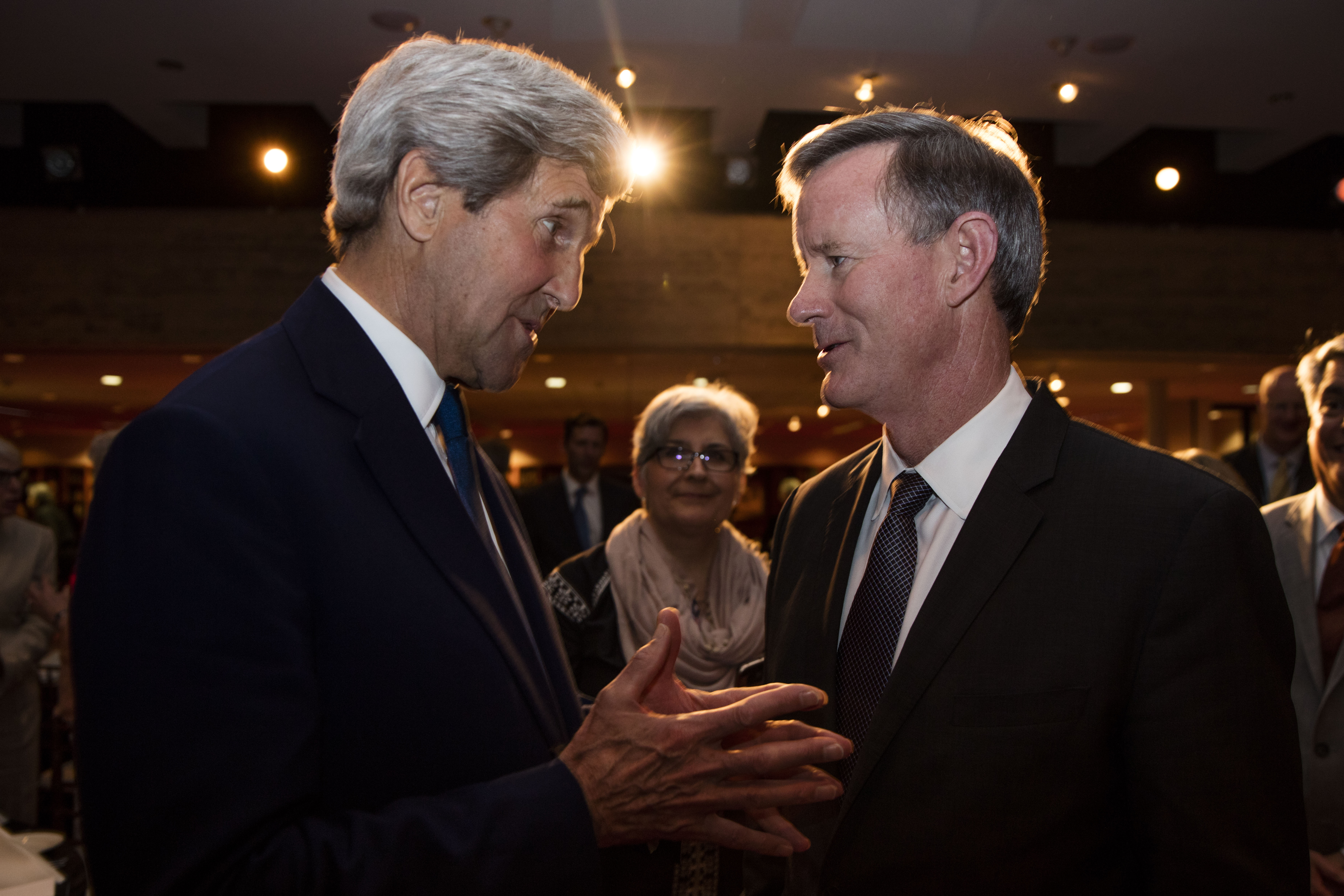
(L-R) U.S. Secretary of State John Kerry, speaks with William McRaven, at a reception at the LBJ Presidential Library

On April 6, 2011, McRaven was nominated by President Barack Obama for promotion from the rank of vice admiral to admiral and appointed as the ninth commander of USSOCOM, of which JSOC is a component.

In his confirmation hearings, McRaven "endorsed a steady manpower growth rate of 3% to 5% a year" and favored more resources for USSOCOM. After the Armed Services committee hearings, in late June, McRaven was confirmed unanimously by the Senate for his promotion to full Admiral and assignment as commander of USSOCOM and took command August 8. The transfer ceremony was led by Secretary of Defense Leon Panetta in Tampa, with ADM Eric T. Olson also in attendance, two days after the Wardak Province helicopter crash which cost 30 Americans, including 22 SEALs, their lives. With several hundred in attendance, Panetta spoke of sending "a strong message of American resolve [and] ... carry[ing] on the fight".

==== Operation Neptune Spear ====
McRaven is credited for organizing and overseeing the execution of Operation Neptune Spear, the special ops raid that led to the killing of Osama bin Laden on May 2, 2011. CIA Director Leon Panetta delegated operational and execution decisions on the raid to McRaven, who had worked almost exclusively on counter-terrorism operations and strategy since 2001.

According to The New York Times, "In February, Mr. Panetta called then-Vice Adm. William H. McRaven, commander of the Pentagon's Joint Special Operations Command, to CIA headquarters in Langley, Virginia, to give him details about bin Laden's compound in Abbottabad, Pakistan, and to begin planning a military strike. McRaven, a veteran of the covert world who had written a book on American Special Operations, spent weeks working with the CIA on the operation, and came up with three options: a helicopter assault using U.S. Navy SEALs, a strike with B-2 bombers that would obliterate the compound, or a joint raid with Pakistani intelligence operatives who would be told about the mission hours before the launch." The day before the assault, President Obama "took a break from rehearsing for the White House Correspondents Dinner that night to call Admiral McRaven, to wish him luck".

A June 2013 Freedom of Information request revealed that on May 13, 2011, McRaven sent an email entitled "OPSEC Guidance / Neptune Spear" that instructed redacted recipients that "all photos [of UBL's remains] should have been turned over to the CIA; if you still have them destroy them immediately" or "get them to" a recipient whose identity was redacted.

In December 2011, McRaven was runner-up for Time Person of the Year for his role in the operation.

==== Retirement from the military ====
In June 2014, it was announced that McRaven had his request for retirement approved after a 37-year career. McRaven retired from the U.S. Navy on September 1, 2014. During the last few years of his career he was also Bull Frog, the longest serving Navy SEAL still on duty, having succeeded his SOCOM predecessor Eric T. Olson in the title.

== The University of Texas Chancellor ==
McRaven was selected as chancellor of the University of Texas System in July 2014. He was appointed on January 5, 2015.

In 2016, the Trump campaign transition team considered McRaven as a potential candidate for National Security Adviser.

As chancellor, McRaven approved the $215 million purchase of 300 acres for a new campus in south Houston. Boosters for a potentially competing institution, the University of Houston, criticized the proposed UT expansion "almost immediately after the system announced the land deal." Some state legislators also criticized McRaven for the purchase because he didn't tell them about it beforehand. A portion of the land had previously been contaminated by a chemical facility. In early 2017, McRaven recommended that the UT Board of Regents approve a plan to sell the land and back out of the expansion, which he revealed would have included a data science center.

On May 31, 2018, McRaven stepped down from his position as chancellor of the university, due to chronic health issues and a desire to spend more time with his family.

McRaven joined the board of the multinational ConocoPhillips, effective October 2018.

In 2022, McRaven joined the board of Palantir Technologies.

== Personal life ==
McRaven is the son of a career Air Force officer. McRaven married Georgeann Brady, then a fellow undergraduate at the University of Texas at Austin, in 1978. They have three children. McRaven attended the 2012 White House Correspondents' Association Dinner as the guest of his fifth grade classmate, Karen Tumulty. McRaven was approached by the centrist group No Labels as a potential candidate for the 2024 presidential election.

In a comprehensive interview, McRaven discussed the importance of sustained U.S. leadership on the global stage, particularly as the 2024 election approaches with concerns over potential isolationist policies. He noted the challenges in military recruitment exacerbated by the pandemic but expressed optimism about future improvements. McRaven emphasized the necessity of continued U.S. support for Ukraine amid its ongoing conflict, highlighting the strategic and humanitarian reasons for backing. He also addressed the situation in Gaza, advocating for balanced U.S. guidance to minimize civilian casualties while managing regional conflicts effectively.

Later, in July 2024, McRaven was reportedly considered by the Kamala Harris campaign as a potential running mate. After initially saying that "any discussions between the campaign and myself must remain confidential", McRaven put out a statement requesting that he be taken out of consideration.

=== Disputes with President Trump ===
"Therefore, I would consider it an honor if you would revoke my security clearance as well, so I can add my name to the list of men and women who have spoken up against your presidency."

— William McRaven, open letter to President Donald Trump, August 16, 2018

In August 2018, McRaven expressed support for former CIA Director John O. Brennan, whose security clearance had recently been revoked by the Trump administration. He authored an open letter to President Donald Trump in The Washington Post entitled "Revoke my security clearance, too, Mr. President", in which he affirmed his regard for Brennan, his former colleague, and offered criticism of the decisions and personal behavior of President Trump. McRaven said of Brennan, "He is a man of unparalleled integrity, whose honesty and character have never been in question ... except by those who don't know him." Of Trump, McRaven wrote, "Through your actions, you have embarrassed us in the eyes of our children, humiliated us on the world stage and, worst of all, divided us as a nation."

In a November 18, 2018, interview on Fox News, Chris Wallace mentioned McRaven's name. Trump called McRaven a "Hillary Clinton fan" and accused McRaven of being a fan of former President Barack Obama. McRaven later told CNN, "I did not back Hillary Clinton or anyone else. I am a fan of President Obama and President George W. Bush, both of whom I worked for. I admire all presidents, regardless of their political party, who uphold the dignity of the office and who use that office to bring the nation together in challenging times." One media source noted that Trump's ire seemed to be rooted in "McRaven's criticism that the president's rhetoric toward the press is the 'greatest threat to democracy' in his lifetime".

On October 17, 2019, McRaven published an op-ed in The New York Times with the headline "Our Republic Is Under Attack From the President", arguing that if Trump did not demonstrate leadership, he was to be replaced. He elaborated his position in a CNN interview the same day, saying that Trump was undermining domestic institutions and damaging America's international standing, especially with respect to the treatment of the Kurds during the 2019 Turkish offensive into north-eastern Syria.

Upon the February 2020 dismissal by the president of Joseph Maguire for having briefed congressional intelligence committee members about emerging evidence of foreign efforts to interfere in the 2020 presidential election, McRaven authored a guest editorial in The Washington Post in which he declared that, "As Americans, we should be frightened — deeply afraid for the future of the nation. When good men and women can't speak the truth, when facts are inconvenient, when integrity and character no longer matter, when presidential ego and self-preservation are more important than national security — then there is nothing left to stop the triumph of evil."

McRaven emphasized the global necessity for U.S. leadership, highlighting concerns among allies about potential U.S. withdrawal from international affairs if former President Trump is reelected. McRaven stressed the importance of maintaining strong alliances globally to ensure effective global leadership, referencing Winston Churchill's sentiment on the value of alliances.

== Philanthropy ==
McRaven and his wife are the members of the board of the Special Operations Warrior Foundation.

In March 2024, McRaven was granted $50-million Courage and Civility Award by Jeff Bezos and his fiancée Lauren Sánchez in recognition of his services to the community. He said he would use the gift to focus on educating the children of deceased veterans, the mental health performance of veterans, and educating the future military leaders.

== Awards and decorations ==
=== Award ribbons and badges ===
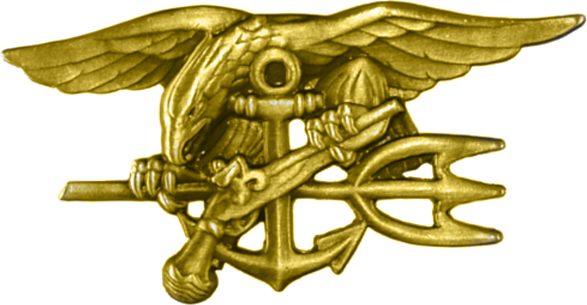

=== Award and badge names ===
Naval Special Warfare insignia
Defense Distinguished Service Medal w/ two bronze oak leaf clusters	Defense Superior Service Medal with oak leaf cluster

Legion of Merit with one gold award star	Bronze Star Medal with gold award star	Defense Meritorious Service Medal
Meritorious Service Medal with three gold award stars	Joint Service Commendation Medal	Navy and Marine Corps Commendation Medal
Navy and Marine Corps Achievement Medal	Combat Action Ribbon	Navy Unit Commendation with two bronze service stars
National Intelligence Distinguished Public Service Medal	Navy "E" Ribbon	National Defense Service Medal with bronze service star
Southwest Asia Service Medal with three bronze service stars	Afghanistan Campaign Medal	Iraq Campaign Medal
Global War on Terrorism Expeditionary Medal	Global War on Terrorism Service Medal	Navy Sea Service Deployment Ribbon
Navy and Marine Corps Overseas Service Ribbon	Legion of Honor	Kuwait Liberation Medal (Saudi Arabia)
Kuwait Liberation Medal (Kuwait)	Navy Expert Rifleman Medal	Navy Expert Pistol Shot Medal

Navy and Marine Corps Parachutist Insignia
Presidential Service Badge	United States Special Operations; Command Badge

=== Additional awards ===
- The Golden Plate Award of the American Academy of Achievement (2014)
- The Distinguished American Award (2016)
- The Texas Commandery of the Naval Order of the United States 2017 Nimitz Leadership Award
- The Federal Law Enforcement Officers Association’s National Award
- The National Intelligence Award

== In media ==
- Dirty Wars, a 2013 American documentary, includes McRaven revisiting the site and survivors of the Khataba raid to apologize.
- His 2014 commencement address for the University of Texas at Austin received almost 60,000,000 views (as of Dec. 5, 2022) on YouTube.
- He was portrayed by Christopher Stanley in the 2012 film Zero Dark Thirty.
- McRaven was featured by Chris Wallace on Fox News Sunday in the segment "Power Player of the Week," September 5, 2021" on remembering those who served in the military embracing "the hero code", the subject and title of his new book.
- In 2021, the speech used in the song by Ben Gold & Allen Watts in trance music called "Change the World".

== Books ==
- McRaven, William H. (1995). Spec Ops: Case Studies in Special Operations Warfare Theory and Practice. Presidio Press. ISBN 978-0-89141-544-2. (Paperback: ISBN 978-0-89141-600-5)
- McRaven, William H. (2017). Make Your Bed: Little Things That Can Change Your Life...And Maybe the World. Grand Central Publishing. ISBN 978-1455570249.
- McRaven, William H. (2019). Sea Stories: My Life in Special Operations. Grand Central Publishing. ISBN 978-1-5837-2974-8.
- McRaven, William H. (2021). The Hero Code: Lessons Learned From Lives Well Lived. Grand Central Publishing. ISBN 978-1-5387-1996-1.
- McRaven, William H. (2023). The Wisdom Of The Bullfrog: Leadership Made Simple (But Not Easy). Grand Central Publishing. ISBN 978-1-5387-0794-4.

== See also ==
- List of United States Navy SEALs

Military offices
Preceded by Stanley McChrystal	Commander of Joint Special Operations Command; 2008–2011	Succeeded by Joseph Votel
Preceded by Eric Olson	Commander of United States Special Operations Command; 2011–2014	Succeeded by Joseph Votel
Academic offices
Preceded by Francisco G. Cigarroa	Chancellor of the University of Texas System; 2015–2018	Succeeded by James Milliken
