= Edward G. Winters III =

American admiral

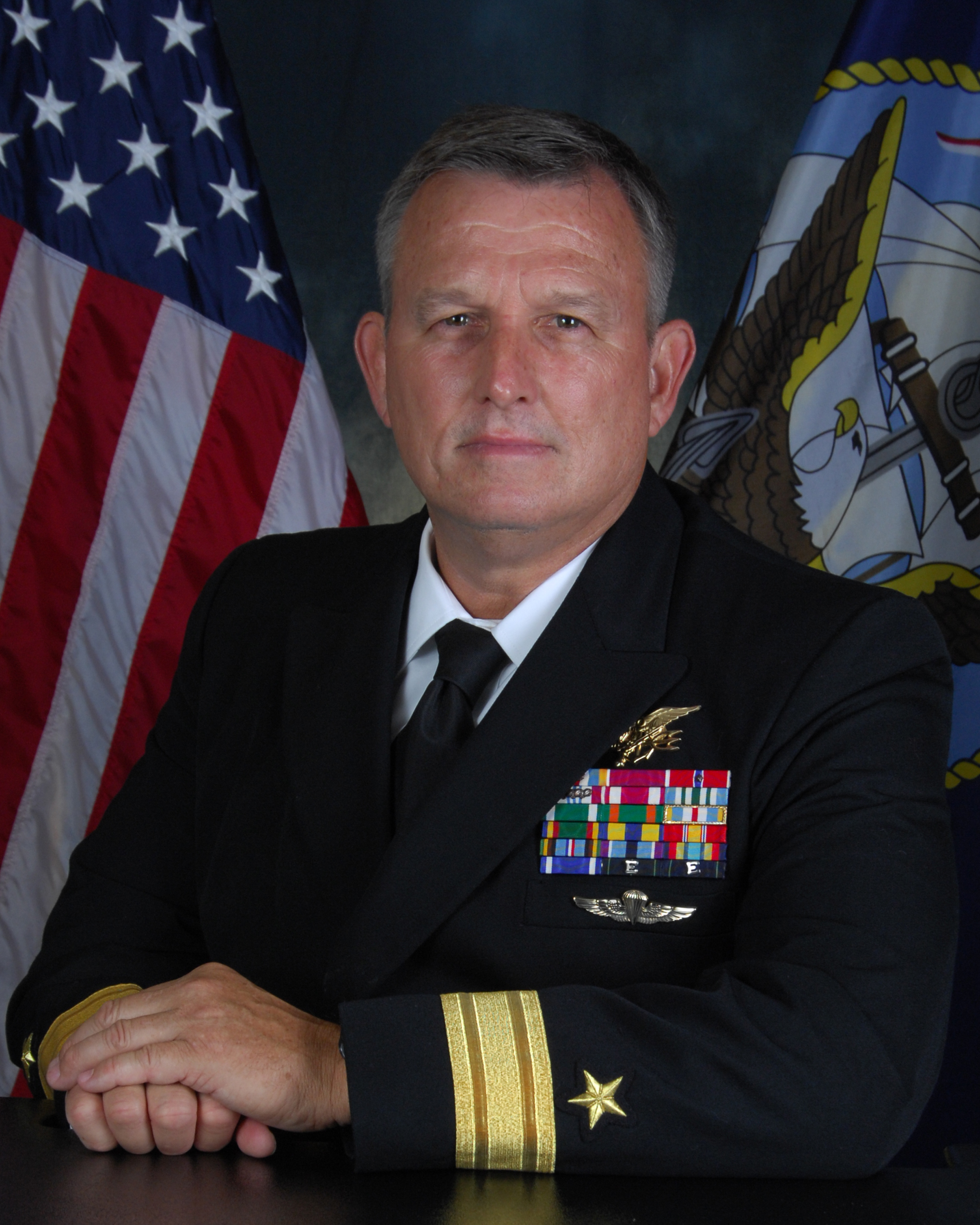
- Born: June 26, 1956 (age 70); Hanover, New Hampshire, U.S.
- Died: June 6th, 2026
- Military career
- Allegiance: United States of America
- Branch: United States Navy
- Service years: 1980–2013
- Rank: Rear admiral
- Commands: DEVGRU; SEAL Team 4 Naval Special Warfare Command
- Conflicts: Operation Joint Forge; Operation Enduring Freedom; Operation Iraqi Freedom
- Awards: Defense Distinguished Service Medal; Defense Superior Service Medal; Legion of Merit; Bronze Star Medal
- Website: http://www.navy.mil/navydata/bios/bio.asp?bioID=482

Edward G. Winters III (born June 26, 1956) was a retired United States Navy rear admiral who commanded the Naval Special Warfare Command from Sept. 2008 to June 2011. He also previously served as commanding officer of the Naval Special Warfare Development Group from 2003 to 2005.

== Naval career ==
Edward Winters graduated from the University of West Florida with a Bachelor of Science degree in 1979 and subsequently attended Officer Candidate School in 1980. Winters then reported to Basic Underwater Demolition/SEAL training (BUD/S) at Naval Amphibious Base Coronado and graduated from BUD/S class 112 in May 1981. Winter's first assignment was to Underwater Demolition Team Twenty Two (UDT-22) at Little Creek, Virginia, later redesignated as SEAL Delivery Vehicle Team Two in 1983. In December 1983, Winters volunteered for assignment to SEAL Team Six at Dam Neck, Virginia and completed a specialized selection and training course. Winters served at SEAL Team Six as element leader, assault team leader and operations officer till April 1989, during which time he planned, rehearsed and operated during classified exercises and operations including the Achille Lauro hijacking. Winters was assigned to U.S. Special Operations Command (USSOCOM) in 1989 as the Joint Special Operations Command's liaison and action officer till 1991, when he was assigned as executive officer of SEAL Team FOUR. He later went on to receive a Master of Arts degree in National Security Affairs from the Naval Postgraduate School in 1994. Winters served another tour with DEVGRU from February 1995 to March 1998 as operations officer until taking command of SEAL Team FOUR from March 1998 till March 2000. Captain Winters then reported to Joint Special Operations Command (JSOC) in 2001 at Fort Bragg as the deputy operations officer and completed multiple deployments in support of Operation Enduring Freedom. Winters was promoted to captain in June 2002. Winters relieved Joseph D. Kernan in 2003 as commanding officer of Naval Special Warfare Development Group until 2005. From April 2007 to June 2008 Winters deployed to Iraq as commander of the Iraqi National Counterterrorism Force Transition Team. Between September 2008 and June 30, 2011, Winters served as the commanding officer of the Naval Special Warfare Command. From 2012 to 2013 he served as director of operations, United States Special Operations Command (USSOCOM). He retired from active duty on 31 Aug 2013 after 33 years of service.

This article contains material from the United States Federal Government and is in the public domain.

=== Awards and decorations ===
U.S. military decorations
Defense Superior Service Medal (two awards)
Legion of Merit
Defense Meritorious Service Medal with three 3/16 inch stars
Meritorious Service Medal
Joint Service Commendation
Navy and Marine Corps Commendation Medal
Navy Achievement Medal
Presidential Unit Citation
Joint Meritorious Unit Award
Navy Unit Commendation
Navy Expeditionary Medal
U.S. Service (Campaign) Medals and Service and Training Ribbons
National Defense Service Medal with service star
Armed Forces Expeditionary Medal
Humanitarian Service Medal
Navy Sea Service Deployment Ribbon
NATO Medal for Former Yugoslavia
Navy Rifle Marksmanship Badge
Navy Pistol Marksmanship Badge

U.S. badges, patches and tabs
SEAL Trident
Navy and Marine Corps Parachutist Insignia
United States Special Operations Command Badge
