= Killing of Logan Melgar =

2017 killing in Mali

Logan Melgar
- Born: May 12, 1983; Lubbock, Texas, U.S.
- Died: June 4, 2017 (aged 34); Bamako, Mali
- Burial place: Arlington National Cemetery
- Military career
- Allegiance: United States
- Branch: United States Army
- Service years: 2012–2017
- Rank: Staff Sergeant
- Units: 2nd Battalion, 3rd Special Forces Group

On June 4, 2017, Staff Sgt. Logan Melgar, a U.S. Army Green Beret, was found dead from asphyxiation in U.S. embassy housing in Mali, where he resided with other US Special Forces members. Investigations later determined his death stemmed from either an attempt to conceal theft and corruption by his killers or a botched hazing incident.

== Initial investigation ==
Shortly after Melgar's death, the Naval Criminal Investigative Service (NCIS) identified two Navy SEAL Team Six members as persons of interest. They were removed from Mali and placed on administrative leave.

By February 2018, the investigation expanded into a comprehensive internal military audit of SEAL Team Six, focusing on the SEALs' conflicting accounts of Melgar's death. Two Marine Raiders were also implicated as accomplices. The suspects initially claimed Melgar was intoxicated, but toxicology reports detected no drugs or alcohol in his system. Investigators noted mutilation to Melgar's throat and upper body, likely from a failed tracheotomy. The suspects claimed they found Melgar unconscious and not breathing, and so they attempted an emergency tracheotomy. However, sources alleged the tracheotomy was performed long after Melgar's death as a cover-up to suggest the perpetrators tried to save him. During this time, Melgar's family was initially told that he had succumbed to an illness, and later that he had died during self-defense training.

The investigation revealed the SEALs and Raiders planned to strangle Melgar until he lost consciousness, bind him, and record a sexual assault to humiliate him.

== Motivations for the attack ==
Five special operators serving with Melgar alleged he discovered the two SEALs and two Raiders stealing funds intended for paying local informants. They then offered Melgar a share of the money, but he refused. The four then planned to blackmail Melgar into silence by recording him being sexually assaulted by a Malian man. All four denied these accusations.

Instead, the Navy Seals and Raiders claimed they attacked Melgar because he abandoned them en route to an embassy party that they were all supposed to go to. They claimed that Melgar purposely drove past them in a city prone to terrorist activity. Admitting they were drinking and bar-hopping that night, they claimed their intent was to teach Melgar a lesson by filming him in a compromising sexual situation with a naked Malian man, not to kill him.

== Charges and legal proceedings ==
Testimony and reports indicated six to seven individuals were involved, including the two SEALs, two Raiders, an unnamed British service member, and one or two Malian security guards. In November 2018, four individuals were charged with felony murder, involuntary manslaughter, burglary, conspiracy to commit assault and battery, obstruction of justice, making false statements, and hazing:

- Navy Seals from DEVGRU: Chief Petty Officers Anthony E. DeDolph and Adam C. Matthews.
- Marine Raiders: Gunnery Sgt. Mario Madera-Rodriguez and Staff Sgt. Kevin Maxwell Jr.

Matthews and Maxwell testified that DeDolph, a former 0-1-0 professional MMA fighter, was the ringleader. DeDolph got them all to agree to choke Melgar unconscious and bind him with duct tape. According to Maxwell's testimony, they also planned to record a Malian security guard sexually assaulting him, although Matthers testified that they only planned to threaten sexual assault. According to charging documents, the group broke into Melgar's room using a sledgehammer, and when Melgar then woke up, DeDolph applied a guillotine choke while Matthews restrained his legs. Maxwell and Madera-Rodriguez simultaneously wrapped Melgar in duct tape. Despite resisting, Melgar stopped breathing and was strangled to death by DeDolph, who broke Melgar's hyoid bone during the chokehold.

Madera-Rodriguez claimed his role was limited to breaking in and playing loud music as a distraction, though prosecutors accused him of participating in the actual duct-taping of Melgar.

Matthews and Maxwell alleged DeDolph sought and received approval for the break-in from Green Beret Sgt. First Class Jamie Morris, Melgar's supervisor. Matthews testified that DeDolph woke Morris, who gave permission before returning to sleep. Maxwell corroborated this claim. However, DeDolph denied involving Morris, and Morris himself rejected any knowledge of or approval for the plan. No charges were filed against Morris, and his name had not appeared in court filings until Matthews and Maxwell mentioned him during their plea deals.

== Aftermath ==
Melgar was survived by his wife of ten years, Michelle Melgar, and their two sons, Jackson and Tyler.

After the killing, in January 2019, Matthews encountered Michelle Melgar at a Las Vegas party. Using a fake name, he flirted, danced with her, exchanged numbers, and asked to accompany her to her room. She declined, but not before Matthews claimed the men who killed her husband were "good guys."

Morris, though never charged, faced severe consequences from the Army's "titling" process, which listed murder and other charges on his record after Matthews and Maxwell's claims. This led to career stagnation, forced retirement 18 months shy of a full pension, and difficulty securing employment. As of 2024, Morris, represented pro bono by attorney Jeffrey Addicott, was fighting to clear his record, reinstate his military status, restore his lost promotion to Master Sergeant, and secure his retirement benefits.

== Sentences and legal outcomes ==
On May 16, 2019, Matthews pleaded guilty to "conspiracy to commit assault, unlawful entry, obstruction of justice, and violating a general order by committing hazing", agreed to testify against the others to avoid more severe charges such as felony murder, and was sentenced to one year in military prison, a rank reduction to E-5, and a bad conduct discharge. After serving his sentence, Matthews became a co-owner and "Director of Special Projects" for a private defense organization, providing "strategic solutions to some of the world's most complex and dangerous problems."

On June 7, 2019, Maxwell pleaded guilty to "negligent homicide, conspiracy to commit assault, hazing, obstruction of justice and making false official statements" and was sentenced to 4 years in prison, a rank reduction to Private (E-1), and a bad conduct discharge. He received a reduced three-year sentence for cooperating and identifying DeDolph as the ringleader.

On January 23, 2021, DeDolph pleaded guilty to involuntary manslaughter and was initially sentenced to 10 years in detention. The sentence was overturned on appeal due to the prosecution's failure to disclose Maxwell's reduced sentence deal. On June 27, 2024, DeDolph was resentenced to 18 months confinement, a reduction to E-4, and a bad conduct discharge.

On July 1, 2021, Madera-Rodriguez pleaded not guilty, but was convicted of involuntary manslaughter, conspiracy to commit assault and battery, conspiracy to obstruct justice, hazing, and making false statements. He received a reprimand, a reduction to E-1, 90 days of hard labor without confinement, six months of confinement, but no punitive discharge.

== See also ==
- Bullying in the military
- Military abuse
