= Scott P. Moore =

American retired naval officer (born 1960)

Scott Purse Moore
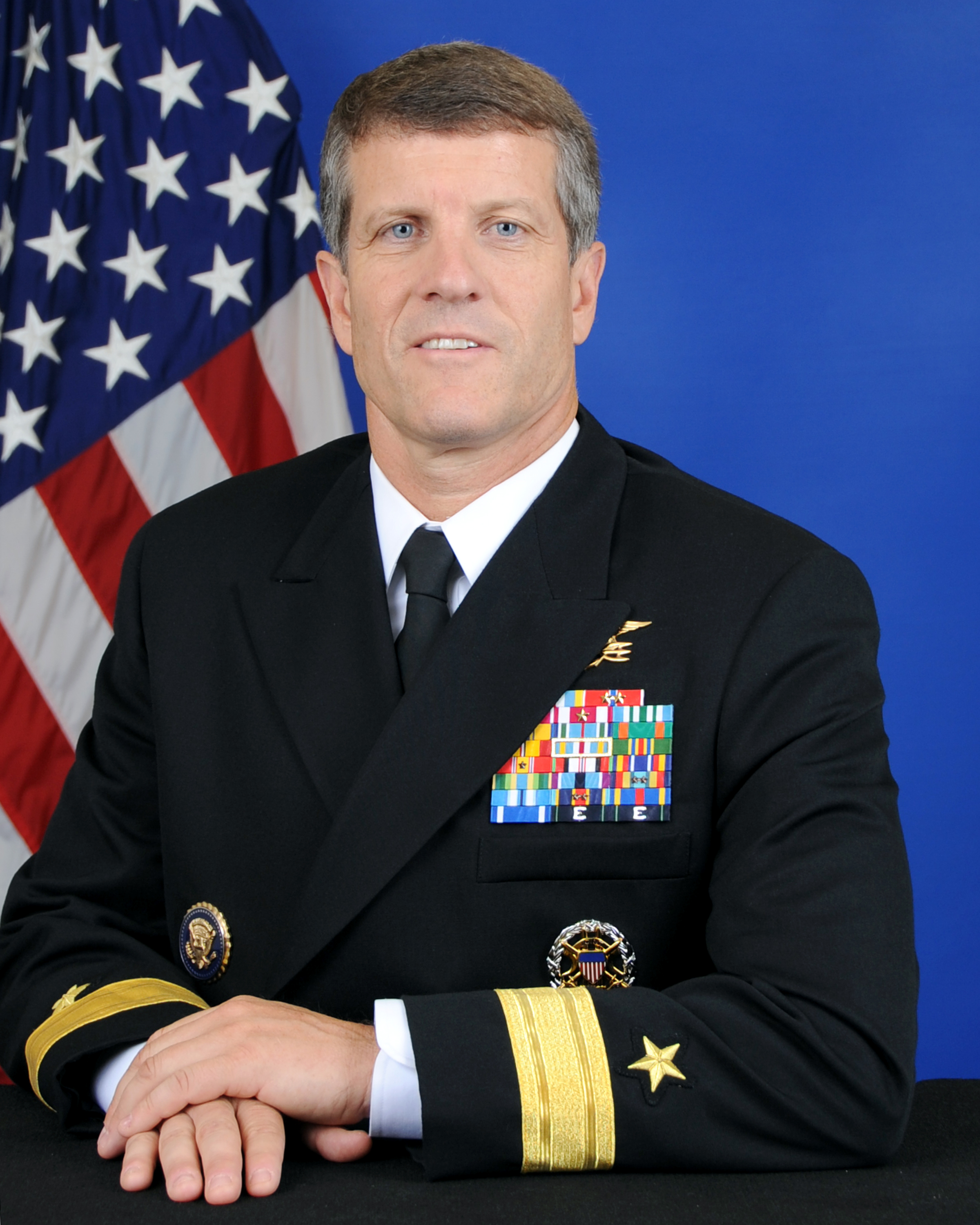
- Rear Admiral Scott P. Moore in 2009
- Born: February 1960 (age 66); Colorado Springs, Colorado, U.S.
- Military career
- Allegiance: United States
- Branch: United States Navy
- Service years: 1983–2014
- Rank: Rear admiral
- Commands: Naval Special Warfare Development Group; SEAL Team 2
- Conflicts: War in Afghanistan
- Awards: Defense Superior Service Medal; Bronze Star Medal; Defense Meritorious Service Medal; Meritorious Service Medal

Scott P. Moore (born February 1960), is a retired rear admiral of the United States Navy. Moore is a former member of SEAL Team TWO and previously served as commanding officer of the Naval Special Warfare Development Group from 2007 to 2009. He is an Admiral Circle member for the exhibit SEAL: The Unspoken Sacrifice. He is active in the Navy SEAL Foundation.

== Early life ==
Moore was born in Colorado Springs, Colorado.

== Naval career ==
Scott P. Moore graduated from the United States Air Force Academy in 1983 with a bachelor's of science degree and received an inter service commission as an ensign in the United States Navy. Moore then received orders to Basic Underwater Demolition/SEAL training (BUD/S) at Naval Amphibious Base Coronado. After six months of training, Moore graduated with BUD/S Class 126 in February 1984. His first operational assignment was with SEAL Team THREE. Following SEAL Tactical Training (STT) and completion of six month probationary period, he received the 1130 designator as a Naval Special Warfare Officer, entitled to wear the Special Warfare insignia. Moore later transferred to SEAL Team TWO as platoon commander. In 1990, Moore volunteered for assignment to Naval Special Warfare Development Group (commonly known as SEAL TEAM SIX or NSWDG) at Dam Neck, Virginia and completed a specialized selection and training course. Moore served as element leader and assault team leader at NSWDG till 1994, during which time he planned, rehearsed and operated during classified exercises and operations. His operational experience in leading SEAL teams included over 2000 missions, Just Cause, Desert Storm, Bosnia, Mogadishu, Afghanistan, and Haiti. His staff and command assignments include executive officer, NSWU 2 from July 1996 to February 1998; current operations officer, NSWDG and commanding officer, SEAL Team TWO from 2000 to 2002. Moore later earned a Master of Arts degree in National Security Affairs from the Naval War College in November 2003. Moore was promoted to navy captain in August 2005. Moore served as deputy commander and unit commander of Naval Special Warfare Development Group (DEVGRU) from 2005 to 2009. Moore was promoted to Navy rear admiral in 2010. His final assignment before retirement was deputy commander, Naval Special Warfare Command from 2012 to 2014.

== Military positions held ==
- Assistant platoon commander, SEAL Team THREE
- Platoon commander, SEAL Team TWO
- Team leader, Naval Special Warfare Development Group
- Joint Special Operations Task Force
- Executive officer, Naval Special Warfare Unit TWO
- SEAL officer detailer, NAVPERSCOM
- Special Operations Command Europe (SOCEUR); maritime operations officer
- Commanding officer, SEAL Team TWO
- Counter Terrorism Division; director
- Executive Office of the President, Director of Counterterrorism, National Security Council Staff
- Special Operations and Counterterrorism, Joint Staff J-37; deputy director
- Office of the Defense Representative; deputy for operations
- Operation officer, deputy commander, commanding officer, Naval Special Warfare Development Group
- Deputy commander, Naval Special Warfare Command;

=== Awards and decorations ===
U.S. military decorations
Navy Distinguished Service Medal
Defense Superior Service Medal with four oak leaf clusters.
Bronze Star Medal with two gold award stars
Legion of Merit
Defense Meritorious Service Medal with six oak leaf clusters
Meritorious Service Medal with gold award star
Joint Service Commendation
Navy and Marine Corps Commendation Medal with gold award star
Joint Service Achievement Medal
Navy and Marine Corps Achievement Medal
Combat Action Ribbon
Presidential Unit Citation
Joint Meritorious Unit Award
Navy Unit Commendation
Navy Meritorious Unit Commendation
Navy Expeditionary Medal
U.S. Service (Campaign) Medals and Service and Training Ribbons
National Defense Service Medal (with bronze campaign stars)
Afghanistan Campaign Medal
Global War on Terrorism Service Medal
Armed Forces Service Medal
Humanitarian Service Medal
Navy Sea Service Deployment Ribbon with two bronze service stars
Navy Arctic Service Ribbon
Navy and Marine Corps Overseas Service Ribbon with two bronze service stars
NATO Medal for Yugoslavia
Navy Expert Rifleman Medal
Navy Expert Pistol Shot Medal

U.S. badges, patches and tabs
Naval Special Warfare Insignia
Navy and Marine Corps Parachutist Insignia
Office of the Joint Chiefs of Staff Identification Badge
