= Jeromy B. Williams =

U.S. Navy admiral

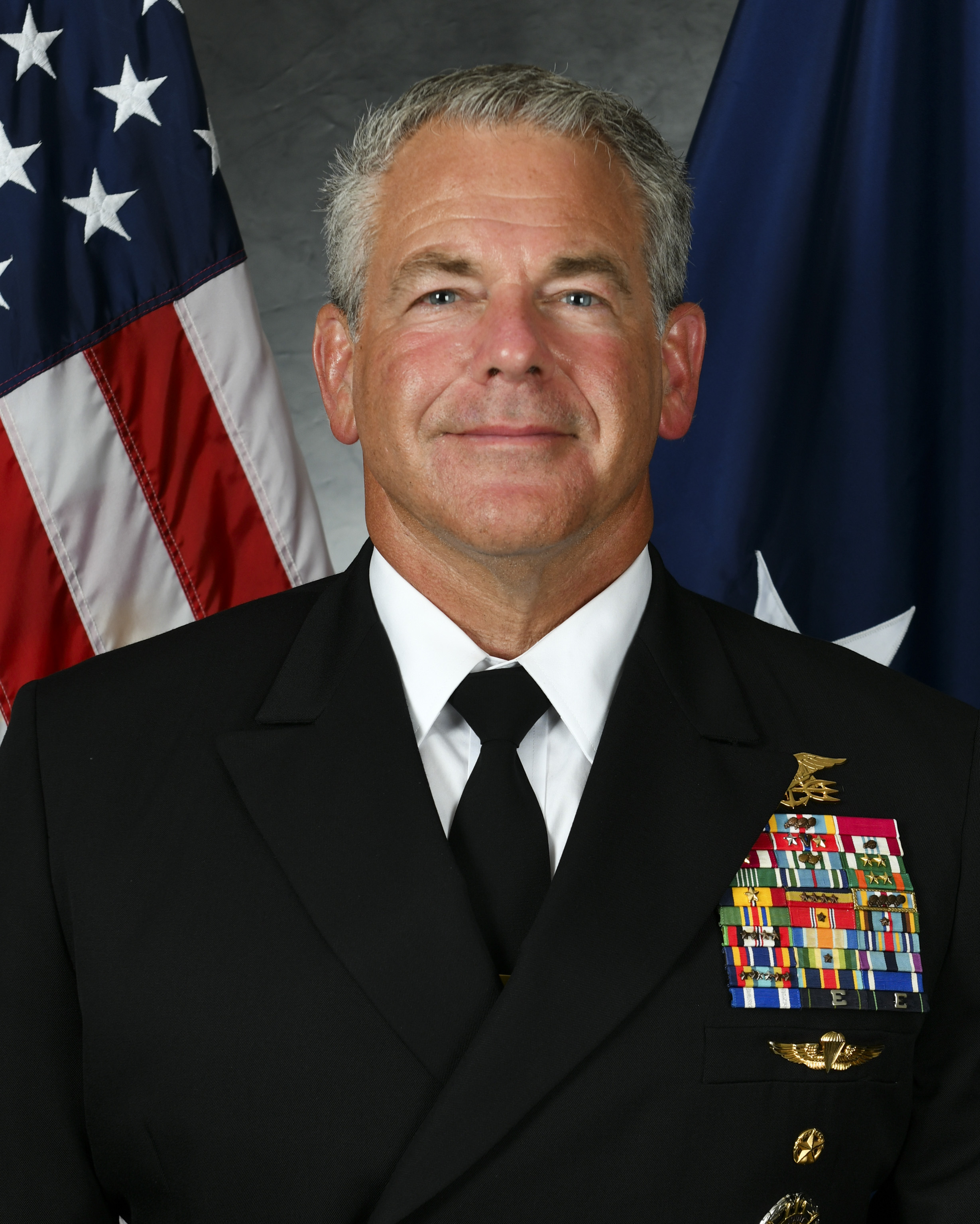
- Military career
- Branch: United States Navy
- Service years: 1993–present
- Rank: Rear Admiral
- Commands: Naval Special Warfare Development Group
- Awards: Silver Star Medal

Jeromy B. Williams is a United States Navy rear admiral who served as Director of Operations, United States Special Operations Command.

== Naval career ==
Williams attended the United States Naval Academy, graduating in 1993 and was commissioned as an Ensign in the U.S. Navy. Williams volunteered for and received orders for Basic Underwater Demolition/SEAL training (BUD/S) at Naval Amphibious Base Coronado. After six months of training, Williams graduated with BUD/S class 191 in 1994. Following SEAL Tactical Training (STT) and completion of six month probationary period, he received the 1130 designator as a Naval Special Warfare Officer, entitled to wear the Special Warfare insignia. Williams served operational assignments as assistant platoon commander, assistant operations officer, and platoon commander. Williams volunteered for and completed a specialized selection and training course for assignment to Naval Special Warfare Development Group (NSWDG) in 2001 serving as assault troop commander, operations officer, and squadron executive officer till 2006 during which time he planned, rehearsed and operated during classified operations during Operation Enduring Freedom. Williams later earned a Master of Arts degree in National Security and Strategic Studies from the Naval War College. His staff and command assignments include staff officer, Joint Special Operations Command (JSOC) from 1999 to 2000, crisis and contingency division chief, Special Operations Command Europe from 2007 to 2009, NSWDG squadron(Red) commanding officer from 2009 to 2012, Naval Special Warfare Officer Detailer at the Navy Personnel Command from 2012 to 2013, deputy director for Integration, United States Special Operations Command from 2013 to 2014, deputy commander and then commander, Naval Special Warfare Development Group from 2015 to 2017.

== Awards and decorations ==
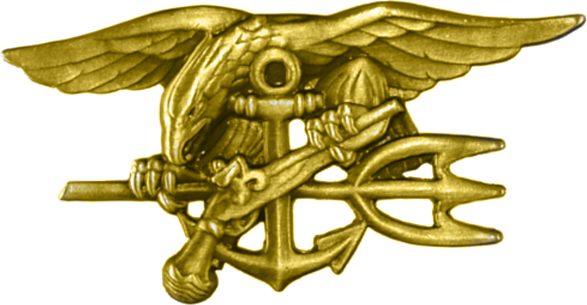

Badge	SEAL Insignia			
1st Row	Silver Star w/ 2 awards stars		Defense Superior Service Medal w/ oak leaf cluster	
2nd Row	Legion of Merit	Bronze Star Medal w/ Combat "V" device, silver 5/16 inch star and bronze 5/16 inch star	Defense Meritorious Service Medal w/ oak leaf cluster	
3rd Row	Joint Service Commendation Medal w/ 2 oak leaf clusters	Navy and Marine Corps Commendation Medal w/ 2 5/16 inch stars	Joint Service Achievement Medal	
4th Row	Navy and Marine Corps Achievement Medal w/ 2 5/16 inch stars	Combat Action Ribbon w/ 1 award star	Navy Presidential Unit Citation w/ 4 bronze service stars	
5th Row	Joint Meritorious Unit Award w/ 4 bronze oak leaf clusters		Navy Meritorious Unit Commendation	
6th Row	National Defense Service Medal w/ service star	Armed Forces Expeditionary Medal w/ service star	Afghanistan Campaign Medal w/ 4 bronze service stars	
7th Row	Global War on Terrorism Expeditionary Medal	Global War on Terrorism Service Medal	Humanitarian Service Medal	
8th Row	Armed Forces Service Medal w/ 1 bronze service star	Sea Service Deployment Ribbon w/ 2 silver service stars and 2 bronze service stars	colspan="2"	Navy and Marine Corps Overseas Service Ribbon
9th row	NATO Medal for the former Yugoslavia	Rifle Marksmanship Medal	Pistol Marksmanship Medal	
Badge	Naval Parachutist insignia			
Badge	Command-at-Sea Insignia			

Irony and Controversy

John Chapman Medal of Honor controversy

Williams commanded SEAL Team Six during part of the later review of the actions of Air Force Technical Sergeant John A. Chapman at the Battle of Takur Ghar. Chapman was killed on March 4, 2002, while attached to a SEAL Team Six reconnaissance element during Operation Anaconda. Subsequent analysis of Predator drone footage and other evidence concluded that Chapman survived after the SEAL element withdrew from the mountaintop leaving Chapman to fight enemy forces alone.

The later reconstruction identified two distinct episodes underlying Chapman’s Medal of Honor. During the initial assault, Chapman advanced uphill under heavy fire, charged an enemy bunker, and killed its occupants at close range. After being wounded and mistakenly believed dead, Chapman survived the SEAL team’s withdrawal and continued fighting alone inside the enemy position. As an approaching quick-reaction force attempted to land, Chapman emerged from cover and exposed his position to suppress enemy fire threatening the inbound helicopter. He was subsequently killed.

Retired Air Force Lieutenant Colonel Dan Schilling, a former member of the 24th Special Tactics Squadron and co-author of Alone at Dawn, has argued that the two episodes, considered separately, each warranted the Medal of Honor. Sean Naylor similarly reported in Air & Space Forces Magazine that Chapman’s actions, taken separately, each qualified for Medal of Honor recognition. Chapman ultimately received a single Medal of Honor encompassing his actions during the battle.

The effort to upgrade Chapman’s Air Force Cross became the subject of a prolonged dispute between the Air Force and Naval Special Warfare. In a 2025 account of the controversy, Naylor reported that the SEALs opposed the upgrade because the Air Force’s reconstruction of the battle necessarily meant acknowledging that the SEAL element had mistakenly withdrawn while Chapman remained alive. According to Naylor, Naval Special Warfare Command was unwilling to accept that finding and, under Rear Admiral Tim Szymanski, mounted what Naylor described as an “unprecedented campaign” against upgrading Chapman’s award.

Naylor reported that the dispute ended with an unusual compromise: Chapman’s Medal of Honor upgrade was allowed to advance only if the Pentagon also upgraded the Navy Cross awarded to SEAL team leader Britt Slabinski to the Medal of Honor. Slabinski, who led the SEAL element off Takur Ghar, maintained that he believed Chapman was dead when the team withdrew. President Donald Trump presented Slabinski with the Medal of Honor in May 2018. Chapman’s widow, Valerie Nessel, accepted Chapman’s posthumous Medal of Honor three months later.

The controversy has continued beyond the awards process. In 2025, Air & Space Forces Magazine reported criticism concerning Chapman’s treatment by the National Medal of Honor Museum. Although Chapman was included in the museum’s permanent historical timeline, Slabinski was selected for an individual exhibit while Chapman was not. Slabinski was also a member of the museum foundation’s board of directors, and several other individuals in leadership or board positions had served as Navy SEALs. A former museum official, speaking anonymously to the magazine, alleged that concerns about embarrassing Slabinski influenced the decision not to give Chapman an individual exhibit. The museum stated that its selections were based on factors including available artifacts and the stories chosen to illustrate the history of the Medal of Honor.
