= Special Operations Warrior Foundation =

US non-profit organization

- Formation: 1980; 46 years ago
- Tax ID no.: 501(c)(3)
- Purpose: To serve the military’s special operations forces and their families
- Website: specialops.org

The Special Operations Warrior Foundation (SOWF) is an American tax-exempt 501(c)(3) nonprofit organization founded in 1980 to provide college scholarships and educational counseling from "cradle to career" to the surviving children of American Special Operations Personnel killed in the line of duty, all Medal of Honor Recipients and Special Operators who have lost their spouse. These services are provided throughout the United States, or overseas, depending upon where the surviving children reside.

== Operation ==
The nonprofit organization is located in Tampa, Florida. SOWF supports America's Special Operations Forces and Medal of Honor Recipients by providing education opportunities to the surviving children of fallen Special Operations Personnel and all Medal of Honor Recipients despite education support for surviving spouses and children being provided as an earned benefit through the Department of Defense and Department of Veterans Affairs.

As of 11 June 2025, 1,196 children are eligible for the Special Operations Warrior Foundation's educational programs. In 2023, an actuarial, produced by a third party, determined that the estimated financial need to meet the foundation's obligations to the families it serves was approximately $400 million.

== Mission ==
The Special Operations Warrior Foundation’s enduring promise to America’s Army, Navy, Air Force, and Marine Corps Special Operations personnel is to: ensure full financial assistance for post-secondary education from an accredited two- or four-year college, university, technical or trade school, as well as educational counseling, preschool grants, private tutoring, college planning and career transition programs to the surviving children of Special Operations Personnel, Spouses of active-duty Special Operations Personnel who pass away and the children of all Medal of Honor Recipients. In addition, SOWF provides immediate financial support for severely wounded, ill and injured active-duty Special Operations Personnel who are hospitalized.

== History ==
Special Operations Warrior Foundation began in 1980 as the Col. Arthur D. "Bull" Simons Scholarship Fund. The Bull Simons Fund was created after the Iranian hostage rescue attempt, Operation Eagle Claw, to provide college educations for the 17 children surviving the nine men killed or incapacitated at Desert One. It was named in honor of the legendary Special Forces soldier Arthur D. "Bull" Simons who repeatedly risked his life on rescue missions.

Following creation of the United States Special Operations Command, and as casualties mounted from actions such as Operations "Urgent Fury" (Grenada), "Just Cause" (Panama), "Desert Storm" (Kuwait and Iraq), and "Restore Hope" (Somalia), the Bull Simons Fund gradually expanded its outreach program to encompass all Special Operations Forces. Thus, in 1995 the Family Liaison Action Group (established to support the families of the 53 Iranian hostages) and the Spectre Association Scholarship Fund (named after the Air Force gunship) merged to form the Special Operations Warrior Foundation (SOWF). In 1998 the Foundation extended the scholarship and financial aid counseling to also include training fatalities since the inception of the Foundation in 1980. This action immediately added 241 children who were now eligible for college funding.

1998 also marked a change in leadership, with Lt Gen Leroy Manor passing the SOWF Chairmanship to GEN Carl Stiner, as well as Col John Carney becoming SOWF’s first full time President and CEO. John Carney slowly built and professionalized the staff, adding Sonny Gonzalez as Admin Director in 1999, Steve McLeary as the Executive Director in 2000, Edie Rosenthal as the Director of Public Relations in 2002, and Carolyn Becker as the Director of Scholarships in 2003.

2013 marked another major year for leadership changes, with GEN Carl Stiner handing over the Chairmanship to GEN Doug Brown, and Col John Carney handing off President/ CEO responsibilities to VADM Joe Maguire. 2018 marked the next major leadership changes, with GEN Brown transitioning the Chairmanship to ADM Eric Olson, and VADM Joe Maguire transitioning the President/CEO duties to MG Clay Hutmacher. In 2019, Steve McLeary retired as the SOWF Executive Director, and COL Sean Corrigan began as the foundation’s Executive Vice President.

As SOWF matured, grew, and became better resourced, the programs and services it provided its constituents evolved as well. From its inception as the COL “Bull” Simons Memorial Scholarship fund, SOWF included the children of Special Operations Warriors fallen in combat. In 1996, after merging with the Families Action Liaison Group (FLAG) and the Spectre Association in 1995, SOWF expanded program eligibility to include the children of SOF Warriors fallen in training. Eligibility expanded again in 2013 with the children of all SOF Line of Duty deaths included. Most recently, program eligibility expanded in 2020 to include the children of all Medal of Honor recipients.

With college tuition and associated expenses at the core of SOWF’s programs from 1980 onward, programs evolved over time, as well. 2006 marked the beginning of SOWF’s support of SOF Warriors wounded in combat, with a $2000 stipend of immediate financial assistance. That stipend increased to up to $3000 per incident in 2012 and again increased to up to $5000 in 2016. As of April 2024, the stipend sits at $6000. In 2018, the immediate financial assistance program expanded to include those severely injured in training and again expanded to include severely ill SOF personnel in 2020. Under the guidance of the Board of Directors, education programs also evolved over time to more holistically support what became SOWF’s top priority in its Strategic Plan, developed in 2018: Student Success. In 2014, SOWF began funding unlimited tutoring for students in grades K-12. Preschool grants of up to $5000 for students 3-5 years old began in 2017. These preschool grants expanded from students aged 3-5 to students aged 2-5 in 2019, and the grants increased to up to $8000 per student, per year in 2020. The SOWF staff developed and implemented its inaugural Educational Planning and Information Conference in 2015, to help high school students plan for and apply for attending the college of their choice. In 2019, SOWF formalized its support of students with learning disabilities, and designated a certified counselor to work with those families on their unique needs. Mentoring and Internship programs began in 2017, with SOWF hiring an additional counselor to develop those programs in 2019. In 2021, the foundation held its inaugural Strong Finish Optimization conference to assist college students and recent college graduates in the transition from college to career. Most recently, in 2021, the board of directors approved private school tuition assistance grants of up to $5000 per K–12 student, per year. In its commitment to its number one priority, Student Success, SOWF continues to enhance educational opportunities, from cradle to career.

== Financial requirements ==
As of 11 June 2025, 1,194 children are eligible for the Special Operations Warrior Foundation's educational programs. In 2023, an actuarial, produced by a third party, determined that the estimated financial need to meet the foundation's obligations to the families it serves was approximately $400 million.
