= Eric T. Olson =

U.S. Navy admiral (born 1952)

Admiral Eric Thor Olson
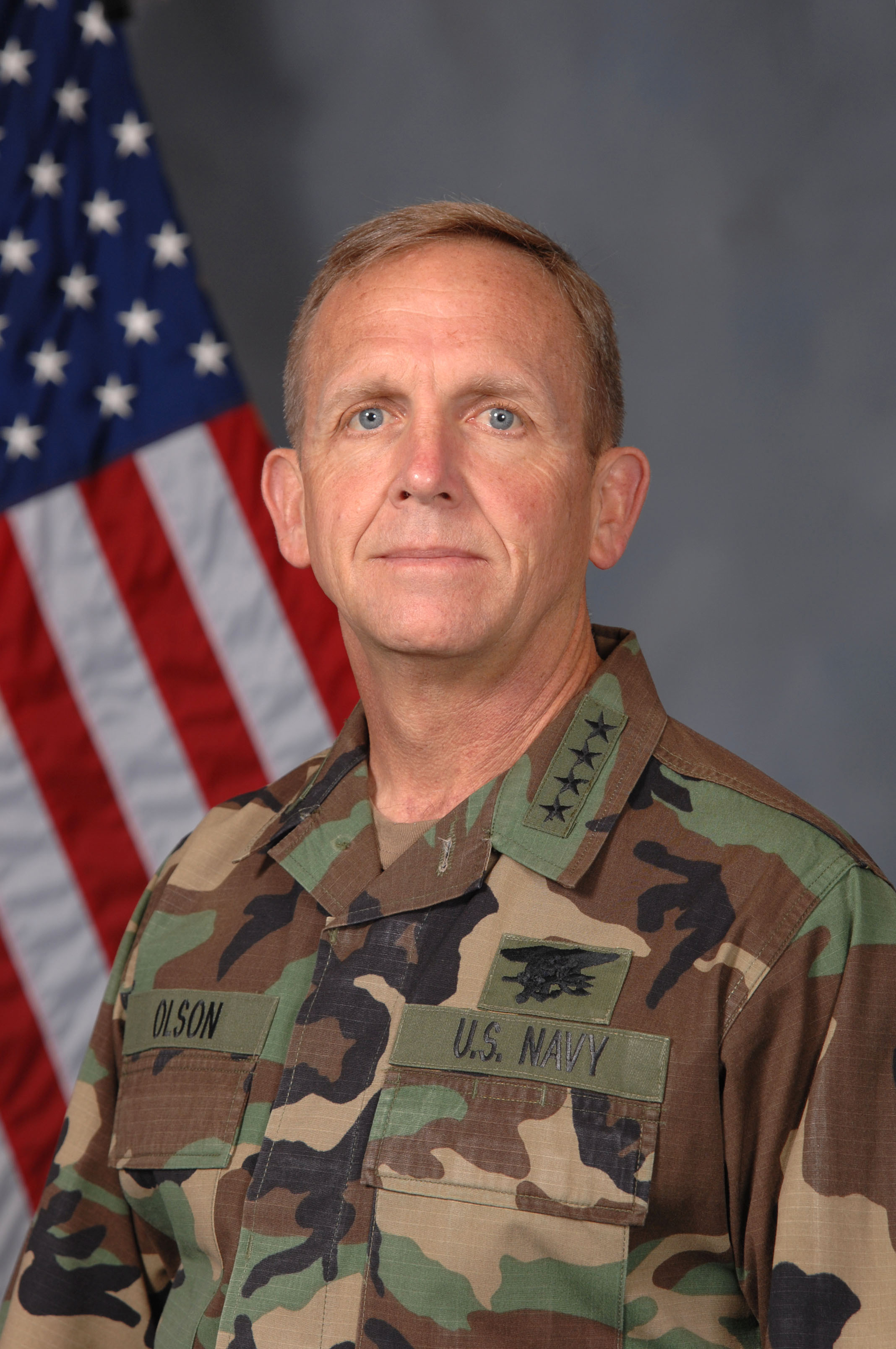
- Admiral Eric T. Olson, USN; Commander, U.S. Special Operations Command
- Born: January 24, 1952 (age 74); Tacoma, Washington, U.S.
- Allegiance: United States of America
- Branch: United States Navy
- Service years: 1973–2011
- Rank: Admiral
- Commands: United States Special Operations Command; Deputy, United States Special Operations Command; Naval Special Warfare Command; Naval Special Warfare Development Group
- Conflicts: Battle of Mogadishu
- Awards: Defense Distinguished Service Medal; Navy Distinguished Service Medal; Silver Star; Defense Superior Service Medal (2); Legion of Merit; Bronze Star (w/Combat V)

Eric Thor Olson (born January 24, 1952) is a retired United States Navy admiral who last served as the eighth Commander, U.S. Special Operations Command (USSOCOM) from July 2, 2007 to August 8, 2011. He previously served as Deputy Commander, U.S. Special Operations Command from 2003 to July 2007. Olson was the first Navy SEAL ever to be appointed to three-star and four-star flag rank, as well as the first naval officer to be USSOCOM's combatant commander. He took command from Army General Bryan D. Brown in 2007. Brown and Olson had served together at the SOCOM headquarters in Tampa for four years. He retired from active duty on August 22, 2011 after over 38 years of service. He relinquished command of SOCOM to Admiral William H. McRaven the same day.

== Military career ==
Olson graduated from the United States Naval Academy in 1973 and qualified as a Naval Special Warfare (SEAL) officer in 1974. He graduated in BUD/S Class 76. He has served operationally in an Underwater Demolition Team, SEAL Team, SEAL Delivery Vehicle Team, Special Boat Squadron, and at the Naval Special Warfare Development Group.

Olson has participated in several conflicts and contingency operations, and has served as a SEAL platoon commander, BUD/S instructor, strategy and tactics development officer and joint special operations staff officer. His overseas assignments include service as a United Nations military observer in Israel and Egypt, and as Navy Programs officer in Tunisia. Olson was commanding officer of SEAL Delivery Vehicle Team ONE from 1989 to 1990. He served on the Navy staff as assistant deputy chief of Naval Operations (Plans, Policy, and Operations). The commander in charge of all Navy SEALs during Desert Storm, Ray Smith, hand picked Olson to be on his staff. From Aug 1991 to Aug 1993, Olson commanded Special Boat Squadron TWO before rejoining DEVGRU. In Oct 1993, Olson participated in the Battle of Mogadishu, he was later awarded the Silver Star for his actions which was cited as "... during combat actions in Mogadishu, Somalia, in October 1993. while under withering enemy fire during actions in support of UNOSOM II operations, Captain Olson demonstrated a complete disregard for his own personal safety in the accomplishment of his mission". In 1994, Olson became commander of the Naval Special Warfare Development Group, an American counter-terrorism unit. Olson was promoted again in 1999 when he assumed command of Naval Special Warfare Command in Coronado, California until August 2002 when he was relieved by Rear Admiral Albert M. Calland III.

Olson earned a Master of Arts degree in National Security Affairs at the Naval Postgraduate School in 1985 and studied at the Defense Language Institute. He is a Joint Specialty officer and Political-Military Affairs sub-specialist with emphasis on Africa and the Middle East. His awards include the Navy Distinguished Service Medal and Silver Star.

In addition to being the first three and four star Navy SEAL, Admiral Olson was the Bull Frog, the longest serving Navy SEAL still on duty. At four-star flag rank, Olson was the highest-ranking Navy SEAL to hold the Bull Frog title. He was succeeded by Commander Brian Sebenaler and Admiral William McRaven, who had also succeeded him as Commander of the United States Special Operations Command and himself retired in 2014.

Olson was the first person to ever throw a ceremonial first pitch for a post-season game at the new Yankee Stadium in 2009.

Olson is an Advisory Board Member of Spirit of America, a 501(c)(3) organization that supports the safety and success of Americans serving abroad and the local people and partners they seek to help.

== Awards and decorations ==
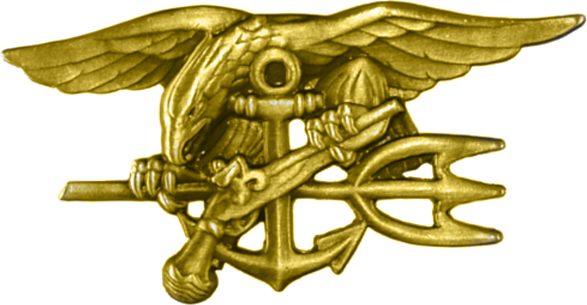

SEAL Trident
Defense Distinguished Service Medal		Navy Distinguished Service Medal	
Silver Star	Defense Superior Service Medal with oak leaf cluster	Legion of Merit	Bronze Star with Combat "V"
Defense Meritorious Service Medal with bronze oak leaf cluster	Meritorious Service Medal with two gold award stars	Joint Service Commendation Medal with bronze oak leaf cluster	Navy and Marine Corps Commendation Medal
Combat Action Ribbon with gold award star	Joint Meritorious Unit Award with bronze oak leaf cluster	Navy Unit Commendation with bronze service star	Navy Meritorious Unit Commendation with two bronze service stars
National Defense Service Medal with two bronze service stars	Armed Forces Expeditionary Medal with bronze service star	Vietnam Service Medal with bronze campaign star	Southwest Asia Service Medal with two bronze campaign stars
Global War on Terrorism Expeditionary Medal	Global War on Terrorism Service Medal	Armed Forces Service Medal	Navy Sea Service Deployment Ribbon with two bronze service stars
Navy and Marine Corps Overseas Service Ribbon with two bronze service stars	Special Operations Service Ribbon	Order of Merit of the Republic of Poland (degree of Commander)	United Nations Medal
Kuwait Liberation Medal (Saudi Arabia)	Kuwait Liberation Medal (Kuwait)	Marksmanship Medal for Rifle Expert	Marksmanship Medal for Pistol Expert
Navy and Marine Corps Parachutist Insignia
Joint Chiefs of Staff Identification Badge		United States Special Operations Command Badge	

== Image gallery ==
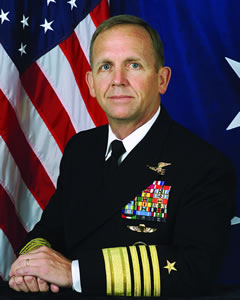
Admiral Eric T. Olson, in Service Dress Blues.

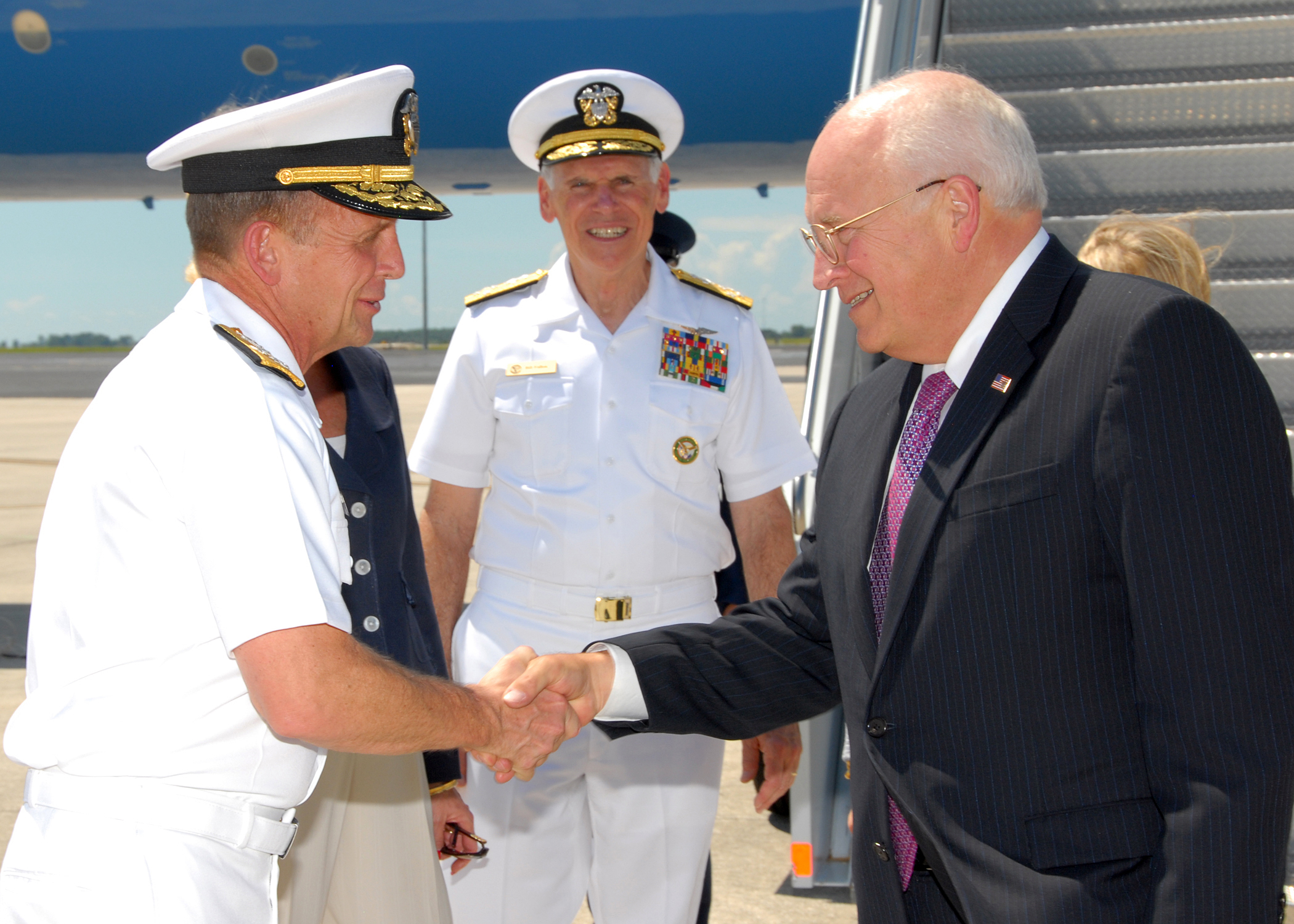
Greeting Vice President Dick Cheney.

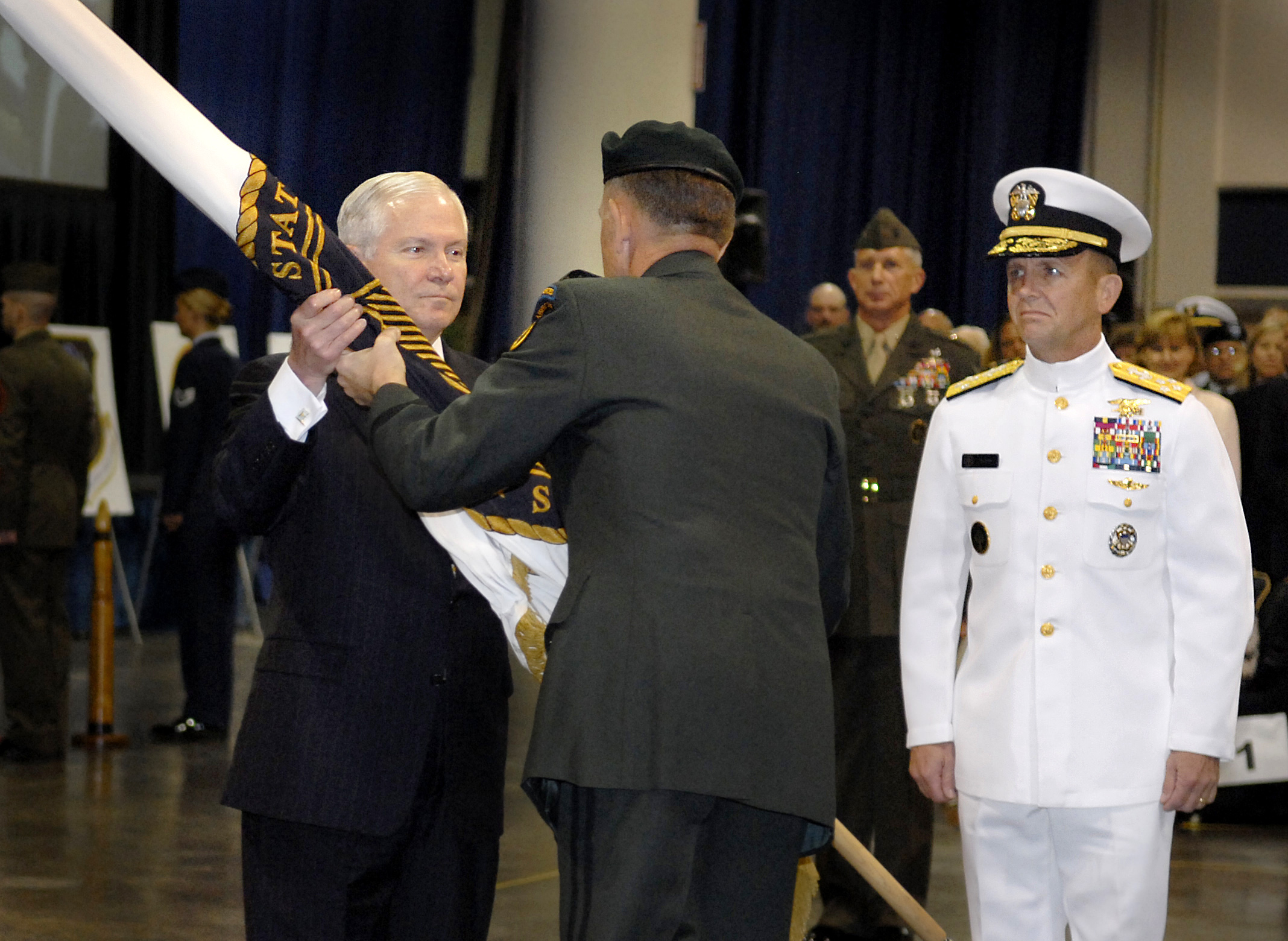
USSOCOM Change of Command where Admiral Olson took command from General Brown.

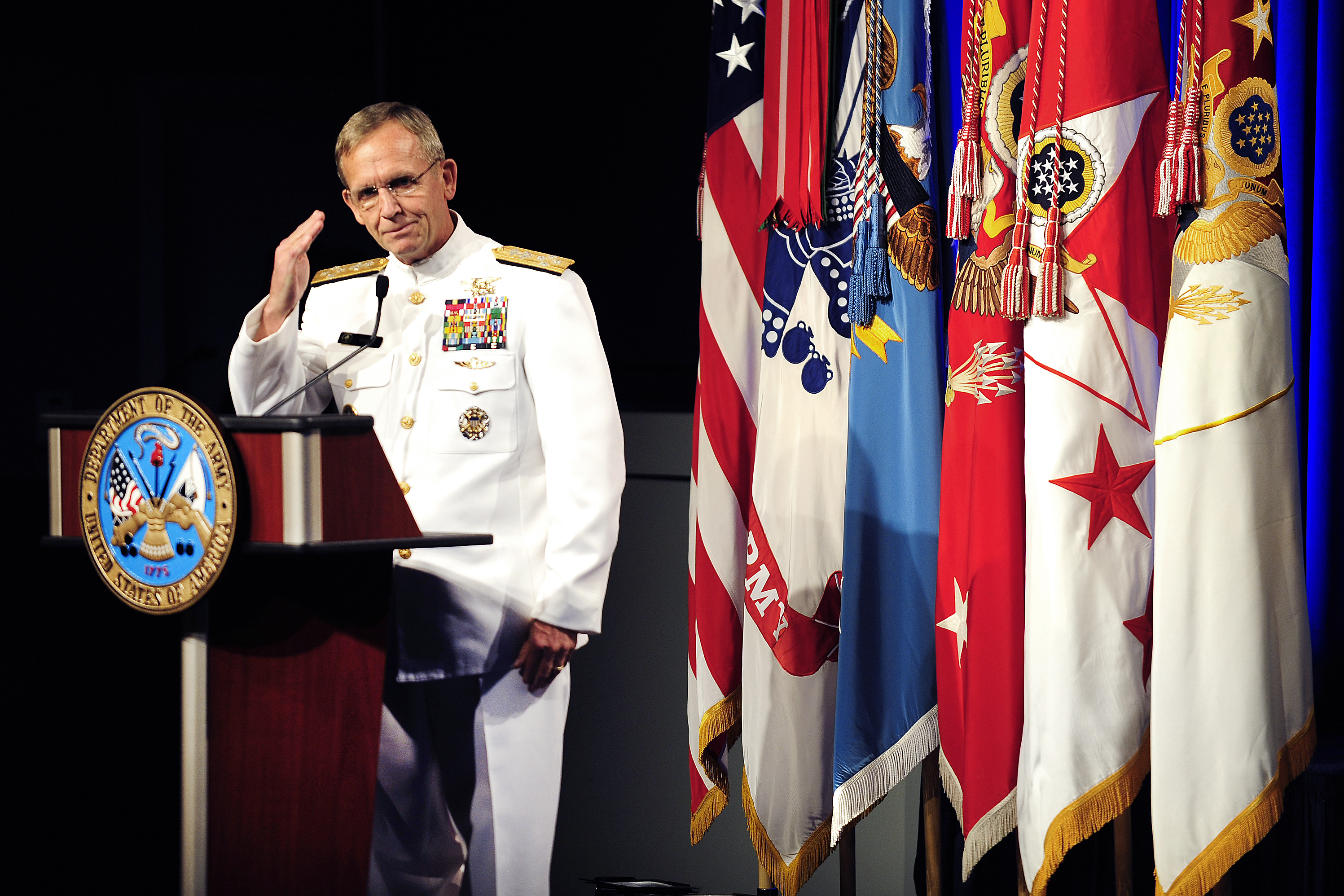
Admiral Eric T. Olson salutes Sergeant First Class Leroy Petry at a ceremony at The Pentagon.

== See also ==
Military offices
Preceded by Bryan D. Brown	Commander of United States Special Operations Command; July 2, 2007 – August 8, 2011	Succeeded by William H. McRaven
