= Center for Homeland Defense and Security =

The Center for Homeland Defense and Security at the Naval Postgraduate School (NPS) in Monterey, California is a school focusing on homeland security education.

The Center's programs and resources have been developed to advance the study of homeland security research, scholarship, and professional discipline to enhance U.S. national security and safety. The Center offers a Master of Arts degree in Security Studies (Homeland Security and Defense), an Executive Leaders Program, Executive Education Seminars, the University and Agency Partnership Initiative, and self-study courses. Resources include the Homeland Security Digital Library and Homeland Security Affairs, an on open-source academic journal.

== History ==
The events of September 11th, 2001 revealed that new homeland security issues and threats were facing the United States. There was a need for educational programs for homeland security professionals who could prevent, plan for, respond to, and lead recovery efforts from terrorist events occurring within the U.S. The Naval Postgraduate School Center for Homeland Defense and Security was created by Congress, the U.S. Department of Justice, and the U.S. Department of Defense in April 2002 to implement this educational role. The first master's degree classes began in January 2003.

The CHDS created educational programs to:

- Educate and prepare local, state, tribal, and federal homeland security leaders
- Develop new policies, strategies, and organizational arrangements to prevent and respond to future terrorist or catastrophic events
- Define the emerging discipline of homeland security and the curriculum components of graduate and executive-level homeland security education
- Promote and encourage homeland security collaboration across professional disciplines and all levels of government
- Facilitate the development of a national homeland security education system by using an open-source model to develop programs, curriculum, and educational tools
- Share educational resources with other academic institutions and agencies to expedite the development of homeland security programs nationwide.

== Programs and resources ==
The programs and resources of the CHDS improve domestic safety and defense by promoting the study of homeland security as a field of research, scholarship, and professional discipline. There are several types and levels of homeland security education programs offered by the Center, including a master's degree program, seminars, a digital library, self-study courses, an online journal, and podcasts.

== The masters program ==
The CHDS Master's Program offers a Master of Arts degree in Security Studies (Homeland Security and Defense) awarded by the Naval Postgraduate School. Candidates for this degree are local, state, tribal, federal, and military homeland security professionals and officials. Courses are taught through a combination of short but intensive in-residence sessions, and network-based learning. This program gives homeland security leaders the knowledge and skill to develop strategies, plans, and programs that reduce national vulnerability to terrorist and catastrophic events. Students learn organizational and management skills, development of interagency cooperation, and actionable policy and strategy. Students’ thesis research benefits their home states or agencies. Some theses have been implemented at the national level.

== The Executive Leaders program ==
The Executive Leaders Program (ELP) has been developed from the CHDS master's degree curricula. Participants study key homeland security topics and issues while building working relationships and networks across local, state, tribal, federal, and jurisdictional lines. This program was designed to accommodate the busy schedules of executives. It is conducted in four one-week in-residence sessions which take place over nine months. As the ELP is a certificate program, it does not require the intensive workload typical of graduate-level degree programs.

== Pacific Executive Leaders program ==
The Pacific Executive Leaders Program (Pacific ELP), a graduate level education curriculum, to address specific challenges facing officials in these unique areas. This course is intended for mid- and senior-level homeland security professionals as an opportunity to develop the strategies, policies and organizational elements they need to better understand and address emerging regional security issues, public policy debates, terrorist threats and best practices in homeland security.

== Fusion Center Leaders program ==
The Fusion Center Leaders Program (FCLP) is built upon guidance from the National Fusion Center Management Group comprising state and local partners, Office of the Director of National Intelligence (ODNI), Department of Homeland Security (DHS), and Department of Justice (DOJ). This graduate level course examines key questions and issues facing fusion center leaders and their roles in homeland security, public safety, and the Information Sharing Environment (ISE). The course is shaped to enhance critical thinking related to homeland security and public safety intelligence issues at the local, state, territorial, tribal and federal levels of government and in the private sector.

== Executive education seminars ==
The Executive Education Seminars (EES) are half-day seminars which help senior-level state and local officials identify and plan for their locale's specific homeland security threats. Customized and conducted at the locality by Mobile Education Teams (MET), these seminars enhance leadership development, communication, and knowledge at all levels of local, state, and federal governments and agencies. Strategic planning, policy development, and organizational design are discussed. Multimedia briefings and news stories create the context for these facilitated, non-attributive roundtable discussions.

== The University and Agency Partnership Initiative ==
The University and Agency Partnership Initiative (UAPI) expands and develops homeland security education nationwide. Partner institutions and agencies around the country are provided with the CHDS curriculum, web-based learning technology, access to the Homeland Security Digital Library, and other CHDS educational resources. All educational materials and resources are provided at no cost to UAPI partners. In return, partners share their curricula and specialized expertise with CHDS and the other UAPI partners. The multiplier effect of this program increases the number of students with access to homeland security education programs nationwide.

== Self-study courses ==
CHDS offers online, non-credit self-study courses in targeted homeland security topics to students, educators, and government officials. These courses are developed by the CHDS faculty from the Center's homeland security master's degree curriculum. Offered at no cost, these courses are designed for homeland defense and security professionals who want to learn more about their field and require the flexibility of self-paced instruction. NPS does not provide credit for these courses, however, participants may download a record of completion.

== Homeland Security Digital Library ==

The Homeland Security Digital Library (HSDL) is the nation's foremost collection of documents and resources related to homeland security. The library assists homeland security professionals, researchers, and academics of all disciplines with homeland security research and information. Library access is offered to U.S. citizens who are federal, state, tribal, and local U.S. government officials; members of the U.S. military; homeland security researchers and academics; or security staff protecting organizations vital to U.S. infrastructure. Resources are collected from a wide variety of sources and are selected and evaluated by a team of librarians and subject-matter specialists before inclusion in the library. Documents are open-source and are published by federal, state, tribal, and local government agencies; professional organizations; think tanks; academic institutions; and international governing bodies. Websites, maps, and other types of resources are also available at the HSDL. Access to most of the HSDL collection requires a password protected account or organizational access (military installations; federal, territorial, tribal, state and local government agencies; and research institutions (including a number of colleges and universities), but the HSDL “On The Homefront” blog, a customized search of select homeland security blogs, a resource page for grants, a list of homeland security books and journal sources, and a Twitter alert for newly published reports, as well as other resources are open-source and available to the general public.

== Homeland Security Affairs ==
Homeland Security Affairs (HSA) is the online journal of the CHDS. It provides a forum to propose and debate strategies, policies, and organizational arrangements to strengthen U.S. homeland security. Contributors to Homeland Security Affairs represent top subject matter experts and practitioners in the field of homeland security and include instructors, alumni, participants in CHDS programs, and partners of CHDS. This peer-reviewed academic journal captures the best of their collective work, as well as that of scholars and practitioners throughout the nation. Homeland Security Affairs accepts submissions of original research articles, short-form articles and essays, and media reviews.
