= Naval Postgraduate School =

Graduate naval academy in Monterey, California, US

- Former name: School of Marine Engineering
- Motto: Praestantia Per Scientiam
- Motto in English: Excellence through Knowledge
- Type: Graduate school
- Established: 9 June 1909; 117 years ago
- Parent institution: Naval University System
- Endowment: $5.08 million (2016)
- Provost: James H. Newman
- President: Ann E. Rondeau
- Students: 2,586
- Location: Monterey, California, U.S. 36°35′53″N 121°52′30″W
- Campus: 627 acres (254 ha)
- Website: nps.edu

Location in the United States

Naval Postgraduate School (NPS) is a Naval command with a graduate university mission, operated by the United States Navy and located in Monterey, California, United States. The Naval Postgraduate School offers master's and doctoral degrees with focus revolving around technically challenging areas of expertise such as computer science, electrical engineering, and cyber.

The NPS mission is to provide "defense-focused graduate education, including classified studies and interdisciplinary research, to advance the operational effectiveness, technological leadership and warfighting advantage of the Naval service."

It offers master's and doctoral degrees in more than 70 fields of study to the U.S. Armed Forces, Department of Defense civilians and international partners. In order to receive one's masters degree from Naval Post Grad, one must complete a thesis with no exceptions regardless of department. This is unlike other master's programs who sometimes do not require a thesis for completion of the degree. Established in 1909, the school also offers research fellowship opportunities at the postdoctoral level through the National Academies' National Research Council research associateship program.

== History ==
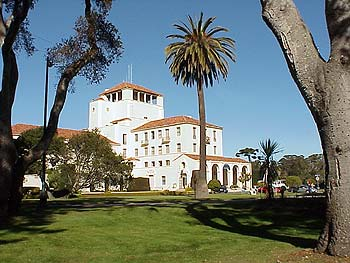
Herrmann Hall

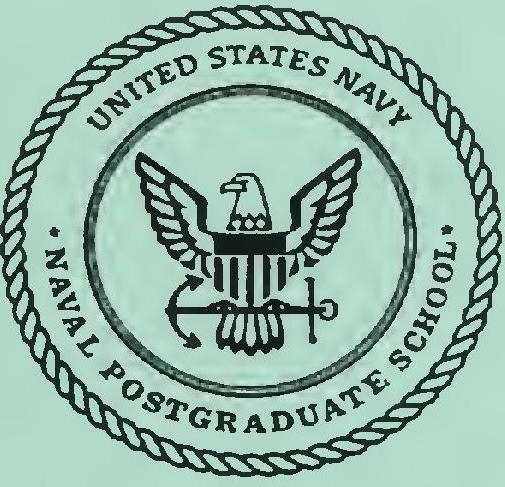
1997 art

On 9 June 1909, Secretary of the Navy George von L. Meyer signed General Order No. 27, establishing a school of marine engineering at Annapolis, Maryland.

On 31 October 1912, Meyer signed Navy General Order No. 233, which renamed the school the Postgraduate Department of the United States Naval Academy. The order established courses of study in ordnance and gunnery, electrical engineering, radio telegraphy, naval construction, and civil engineering and continued the program in marine engineering.

During World War II, Fleet Admiral Ernest King, Chief of Naval Operations and Commander-in-Chief United States Fleet, established a commission to review the role of graduate education in the Navy. In 1945, Congress passed legislation to make the school a fully accredited, degree-granting graduate institution. Two years later, Congress adopted legislation authorizing the purchase of an independent campus for the school.

A postwar review team, which had examined 25 sites nationwide, had recommended the old Hotel Del Monte in Monterey, California as a new home for the Postgraduate School. During World War II, the Navy had leased the facilities, first for a pre-flight training school, then for part of the Electronics Training Program. Negotiations with the Del Monte Properties Company led to the purchase of the hotel and 627 acres (254 ha) of surrounding land for $2.13 million.

The Naval Postgraduate School moved to Monterey in December 1951. Today, the school has over 40 programs of study including highly regarded M.S. and PhD programs in management, national security affairs, electrical and computer engineering, mechanical and astronautical engineering, systems engineering, space systems and satellite engineering, physics, oceanography meteorology, and other disciplines, all with an emphasis on military applications.

Former Guantanamo Bay Naval Base commander and World War II and Korean War veteran, RADM Edward J. O'Donnell, assumed the role as superintendent of the school in 1965. He himself graduated from the school in the 1930s with a degree in ordnance engineering. He would leave the role of superintendent in 1967 after retiring from the Navy.

The Naval Postgraduate School has graduated more than 40 astronauts, greater than any other graduate school in the country. The school is home to the Center for Information Systems Security Studies and Research (CISR) and the Center for Homeland Defense and Security (CHDS). CISR is America's foremost center for defense-related research and education in Information Assurance (IA), Inherently Trustworthy Systems (ITC), and defensive information warfare; and CHDS provides the first homeland security master's degree in the United States.

The Consortium for Robotics and Unmanned Systems Education and Research (CRUSER) was established at NPS in 2011. The Navy described the program as providing NPS faculty and researchers with seed funding for important research projects geared toward advancing autonomous solutions.

On 27 November 2012, Vice Admiral Daniel T. Oliver (retired) and Provost Dr. Leonard Ferrari were relieved of duty by Secretary of the Navy Ray Mabus. A Navy press release cited findings from a Naval Inspector General investigation which included Oliver's misuse of standard contracting procedures to circumvent federal hiring and compensation authorities. The investigation also found that both Oliver and Ferrari "inappropriately accepted gifts from an independent private foundation organized to support the school."

In October 2013, retired Vice Adm. Ronald A. Route became the second civilian president of the Naval Postgraduate School. Vice Adm. Ann E. Rondeau relieved Route to become the 49th president of NPS in January 2019.

In 2019, NPS renamed its business school, the Graduate School of Business and Public Policy, to the Graduate School of Defense Management (GSDM) in an effort to better signal its unique defense-focused identity and mission to strategic stakeholders and its academic peers. GSDM offers degree programs in nine different fields, ranging from logistics to information technology management to manpower, as well as three, unique distance learning programs.

In December 2020, NPS leadership officially commissioned the Wayne P. Hughes Jr. Naval Warfare Studies Institute (NWSI) NWSI's mission is to expedite the DON's access to the university's intellect and resources for solving warfighting issues. NWSI consists of NPS' Senior Service Representatives and Warfare Chairs, as well as the Military Associate Deans of all four NPS graduate schools (international studies, operational and information sciences, engineering and applied sciences, and defense management). NWSI provides operational and functional expertise as well as access to all areas of study and research, every faculty member and the entire student body. NWSI also partners with outside entities, including the Naval War College, that complement their educational and research activities.

1. Academics

=== Departments ===
NPS offers graduate programs through thirteen departments:

- Applied Mathematics
- Computer Science
- Defense Analysis
- Department of Defense Management
- Electrical and Computer Engineering
- Information Sciences
- Mechanical and Aerospace Engineering
- Meteorology
- National Security Affairs
- Oceanography
- Operations Research
- Physics
- Systems Engineering

=== Groups ===
Academic Groups at NPS are interdisciplinary and responsible for one or more curricula.

- Applied Cryptologic Engineering
- Crowd Dynamics Modeling
- Cyber Academic Group
- Data Science and Analytics Academic Group
- Energy Academic Group
- Space Systems Academic Group
- Undersea Warfare Academic Group

=== Faculty ===
NPS faculty consists of civilian professors, Permanent Military Professors, and active-duty military officers serving as instructors and researchers.

- Doctorates: 298
- Masters: 166
- Tenure-Track: 172
- Non-Tenure: 210
- Instructional / Research Support: 132

=== Students ===
NPS students are mostly active-duty officers from all branches of the U.S. military, although active-duty enlisted, U.S. government civilians and officers from approximately 50 partner countries can also matriculate under a variety of programs.

== Notable alumni ==
=== Academia ===
- Ben Connable, retired Marine major, professor at the Frederick S. Pardee RAND Graduate School
- David B. Hertz (Class of 1944), Operations researcher; a pioneer of Monte Carlo methods in finance
- David Riedman (Class of 2015), professor and data scientist
- Joseph Weber (Class of 1945), Regarded as the "Father of Gravitational Wave Detection"

=== Astronauts ===
- Scott Altman (Class of 1990)
- Dan Bursch (Class of 1991)
- Gerald Carr (Class of 1961)
- Eugene Cernan (Class of 1964)
- Michael Coats (Class of 1979)
- Robert Curbeam (Class of 1990)
- Ronald Evans (Class of 1964)
- Christopher Ferguson (Class of 1992)
- Mike Foreman (Class of 1986)
- Stephen Frick (Class of 1994)
- Kenneth Ham (Class of 1996)
- John Herrington (Class of 1995)
- David Hilmers (Class of 1978)
- Brent Jett (Class of 1989)
- David Leestma (Class of 1972)
- Michael Lopez-Alegria (Class of 1984)
- Victor Glover (Class of 2009)
- Jon McBride (Class of 1971)
- William McCool (Class of 1992)
- Edgar Mitchell (Class of 1961)
- Carlos Noriega (Class of 1990)
- Alan G. Poindexter (Class of 1995)
- Robert F. Overmyer (Class of 1964)
- Marcos Pontes (Class of 1998)
- Kenneth S. Reightler Jr. (Class of 1984)
- Kent Rominger (Class of 1987)
- Winston E. Scott (Class of 1980)
- Michael Smith (Class of 1968)
- Robert Springer (Class of 1971)
- Paul Weitz (Class of 1964)
- Jeffrey Williams (Class of 1987)

=== Government and Politics ===
- Keith B. Alexander (Class of 1983), Director of the National Security Agency
- Harry Coker, National Cyber Director; Secretary of the Maryland Department of Commerce
- Samuel P. De Bow Jr., Director, NOAA Commissioned Officer Corps
- Carlos Del Toro (Class of 1989), 78th Secretary of the Navy
- Ed Gallrein, former Navy SEAL officer, Republican Party nominee in the U.S. House of Representatives election for Kentucky's fourth congressional district in 2026
- Linda Ham - (Class of 1996), NASA executive
- Elizabeth Hight (Class of 2001), Vice director of the Defense Information Systems Agency
- Harvey E. Johnson Jr. (Class of 1983), Chief operating officer of Federal Emergency Management Agency
- Mark Kelly (Class of 1994), Astronaut, United States Senator from Arizona
- David W. May, Adjutant General of Wisconsin
- John Scott Redd (Class of 1993), Director of the National Counterterrorism Center
- James D. Watkins (Class of 1958), Secretary of Energy, Chief of Naval Operations
- Mark Weatherford, first deputy under secretary for cybersecurity at the DHS
- Thomas E. White (Class of 1974), United States Secretary of the Army

=== Military ===
- Stan Arthur (Class of 1979), Vice Chief of Naval Operations
- Nancy E. Brown (Class of 1999), Director for C4 Systems
- Arleigh Burke (Class of 1930), Chief of Naval Operations
- Arthur K. Cebrowski, Director of the Office of Force Transformation
- Stanley Thomas Counts (Class of 1955), Rear Admiral; NATO RIM-7 Sea Sparrow project manager
- Mark E. Ferguson III (Class of 1984), Vice Chief of Naval Operations
- Lillian E. Fishburne (Class of 1982), First African-American female Rear Admiral (RDML) in the United States Navy
- George A. Fisher Jr. (Class of 1972), retired Army lieutenant general, commander of First United States Army
- Lee F. Gunn, Naval Inspector General USN
- Cecil D. Haney (Class of 1990), Commander, U.S. Pacific Fleet
- William H. McRaven (Class of 1993), Commander, United States Special Operations Command
- Wayne E. Meyer (Class of 1955), Regarded as the "Father of Aegis"
- John H. Miller (Class of 1957), Marine Corps Lieutenant general
- Michael Mullen (Class of 1985), 17th Chairman of the Joint Chiefs of Staff
- Edward J. O'Donnell (1930s), Superintendent of Naval Postgraduate School 1965–1967
- Eric T. Olson (Class of 1985), Commander, U.S. Special Operations Command
- Samuel Paparo, current commander of the United States Indo-Pacific Command
- Earl E. Stone (Class of 1924), First Director of Armed Forces Security Agency, precursor to the NSA
- William D. Swenson (Class of 2017), Medal of Honor, Lt. Colonel, U.S. Army
- Jan Tighe (Class of 2001), Deputy director of operations for U.S. Cyber Command, first female IW flag officer
- Patricia Ann Tracey (Class of 1974), First female Vice Admiral in the US Navy
- Thomas R. Turner II (Class of 1986), Commanding general of the United States Army North
- William S. Wallace (Class of 1980), Commanding General, United States Army Training and Doctrine Command
- Edward G. Winters, III (Class of 1995), Commander, Naval Special Warfare Command

=== Foreign Alumni ===
- Qamar Javed Bajwa, Chief of Army Staff, Pakistan Army
- Bujar Nishani (Class of 1996), President of Albania
- Darren Henfield (Class of 2015), former Foreign Affairs Minister, Senator and Congressman of The Bahamas.

== Notable faculty ==
- John Arquilla
- Guillermo E. Barrera (Class of 1983), former Commander of the Colombian Navy
- Sam Buttrey
- Dorothy Denning
- Peter J. Denning
- Simson Garfinkel (taught 2006-2015)
- Richard Hamming (taught 1976-1997)
- Gary Kildall
- Raymond Madachy
- Alice L. Miller
- Vali Nasr
- Guillermo Owen
- I. Michael Ross
- Paul N. Stockton
- Kathryn Strutynski

== See also ==
- Air Force Institute of Technology, the US Air Force sister school of NPS
- America's Army, a training video game developed at the MOVES Institute at NPS
- Naval Postgraduate School's Center for Asymmetric Warfare (CAW)
- Centre d'Etudes Diplomatiques et Stratégiques
- Center for Homeland Defense and Security
- Defense Language Institute
- Fleet Numerical Meteorology and Oceanography Center
