= SEAL Team Six =

United States Navy component of JSOC

Naval Special Warfare Development Group
- Founded: November 1980
- Country: United States
- Branch: United States Navy; US Navy SEALS
- Type: Special operations forces Special mission unit
- Role: Counterterrorism
- Size: 1,787 personnel authorized (2014): 1,342 military personnel; 445 civilian personnel
- Part of: Joint Special Operations Command; United States Naval Special Warfare Command
- Headquarters: Dam Neck Annex; NAS Oceana, Virginia Beach, Virginia, U.S.
- Nickname: SEAL Team Six
- Engagements: Invasion of Grenada; TWA Flight 847 hijacking; Achille Lauro hijacking; Operation Prime Chance; Operation Just Cause; Gulf War; Somali Civil War; Operation Gothic Serpent; Operation Uphold Democracy; Yugoslav Wars; Stabilisation Force in Bosnia and Herzegovina; War on terror; Operation Enduring Freedom; Iraq War; Al-Qaeda insurgency in Yemen; War in North-West Pakistan; Maersk Alabama hijacking; Operation Neptune Spear; 2013 raid on Barawe; Operation Inherent Resolve; Operation Freedom's Sentinel; 2019 operation in North Korea; 2026 Iran war; 2026 United States pilot rescue operation in Iran; 2026 United States strikes in Nigeria
- Unit awards: Presidential Unit Citation

The Naval Special Warfare Development Group (NSWDG), abbreviated as DEVGRU ("Development Group") (Note: The Atlantic reported in October 2010 that the designation "DEVGRU" may have been changed at some point, with the subsequent designations being classified.) and unofficially known as SEAL Team Six, is the United States Navy component of the Joint Special Operations Command (JSOC). The unit is often referred to within JSOC as Task Force Blue. DEVGRU is administratively supported by the Naval Special Warfare Command and operationally commanded by JSOC. Most information concerning DEVGRU is designated as classified, and details of its activities are not usually commented on by either the United States Department of Defense or the White House.

DEVGRU (along with its Army and Air Force counterparts, Delta Force, Intelligence Support Activity, the 75th Ranger Regiment's Regimental Reconnaissance Company and 24th Special Tactics Squadron) is one of the U.S. military's special mission units, tasked with the most complex, classified, and dangerous missions directed by the president of the United States or the secretary of defense. DEVGRU conducts various specialized missions such as counterterrorism, hostage rescue, special reconnaissance, and direct action (short-duration strikes or small-scale offensive actions), often against high-value targets.

== History ==
The origins of DEVGRU are in SEAL Team Six, a unit created post Operation Eagle Claw. During the Iran hostage crisis in 1979, Richard Marcinko was one of two U.S. Navy representatives for a Joint Chiefs of Staff task force known as the TAT (Terrorist Action Team). The purpose of the TAT was to develop a plan to free the American hostages held in Iran. In the wake of the disaster at the Desert One base in Iran, the Navy saw the need for a full-time counter-terrorist unit and tasked Marcinko with its design and development.

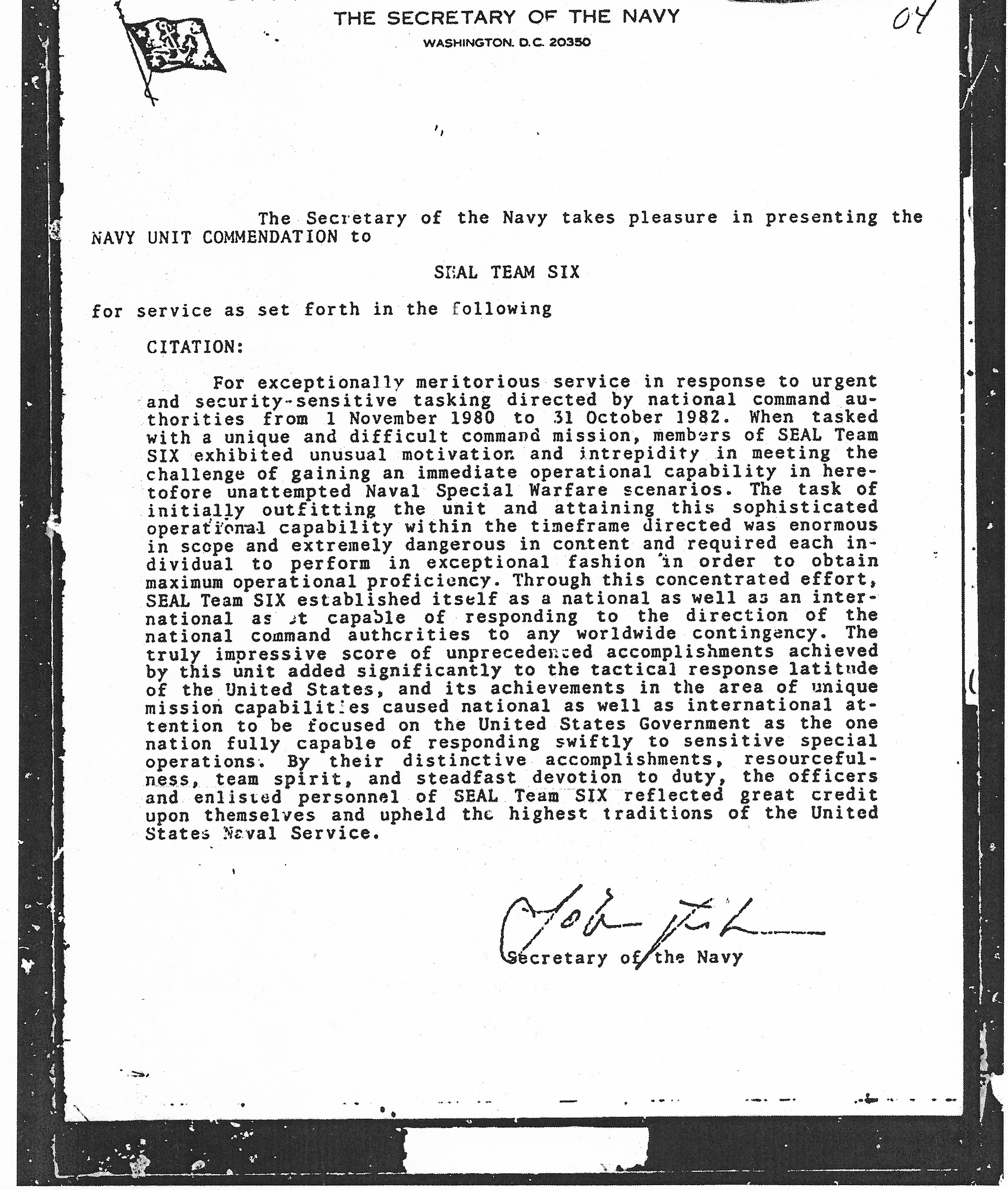
Navy Unit Commendation awarded to SEAL TEAM SIX for exceptionally meritorious service from November 1980 to October 1982

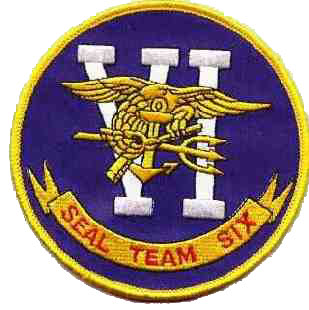
SEAL Team Six patch

Marcinko was the first commanding officer of this new unit. At the time, there were two SEAL Teams, SEAL Team ONE and SEAL Team TWO. Marcinko named the unit SEAL Team Six in order to confuse Soviet intelligence as to the number of actual SEAL teams in existence. The unit's plankowners (founding members) were interviewed and hand-picked by Marcinko from throughout the UDT/SEAL community. SEAL Team Six was formally commissioned in November 1980, and an intense, progressive work-up training program made the unit mission-ready six months later. SEAL Team Six became the U.S. Navy's premier hostage rescue and counter-terrorism unit. It has been compared to the U.S. Army's elite Delta Force. Marcinko held the command of SEAL Team Six for three years, from 1980 to July 1983, instead of the typical two-year command in the Navy at the time. SEAL Team Six started with 75 shooters. The unit has virtually unlimited resources at its disposal. In 1984, Marcinko and a dozen members of SEAL Team Six would go on to form "Red Cell" (also known as OP-06D), a special unit designed to test the security of American military installations.

In 1987, SEAL Team Six was dissolved. A new unit named the "Naval Special Warfare Development Group" was formed, essentially as SEAL Team Six's successor. Reasons for the disbanding are varied, but the name SEAL Team Six is often used in reference to DEVGRU.

On September 26, 2010, British aid worker Linda Norgrove was kidnapped by members of the Taliban in the Kunar Province of eastern Afghanistan. After intelligence reports indicated that a group of local elders were calling for Norgrove to be executed "like the Russian" (a possible reference to the Russian war in Afghanistan), a rescue attempt spearheaded by DEVGRU operators was staged, only for Norgrove to be killed by a SEAL's errant hand grenade. It was initially reported that Norgrove had been killed by one of her captors setting off a suicide vest, but a joint investigation between the United States and the United Kingdom later confirmed that she had been accidentally killed by her rescuers. Several Navy SEALs were disciplined for not immediately notifying officers about throwing the grenade, which was a breach of military law.

In 2017, Army Special Forces Staff Sergeant Logan Melgar died from trauma received during an apparent on-base hazing incident in Mali that resulted in the criminal prosecutions of two DEVGRU members and two Marine Raiders.

Following a two-year investigation by The Intercept, a report was released in 2017, accusing SEAL Team Six and its commanding officers of abuses, crimes and coverups. The investigation included interviews with numerous members and officers of the unit, who recounted the group's involvement in abuses, including what some members described as war crimes. Former unit members and officers said that commanding officers tolerated and covered up abuses.

In September 2025, The New York Times first reported on a previously top-secret mission conducted by the U.S. Navy's SEAL Team 6 in North Korea in early 2019. The operation, personally approved by then-President Donald Trump during a period of high-stakes nuclear diplomacy, had the objective of planting a sophisticated electronic listening device to intercept communications from North Korean leader Kim Jong-un. According to the report, the mission unraveled after the SEAL team, deployed from a nuclear submarine via mini-subs, encountered a small North Korean boat near their landing site. Fearing they had been compromised, the SEALs opened fire, killing the entire crew. The mission was immediately aborted without the device being planted, and all U.S. forces were exfiltrated. Subsequent evidence suggested the boat's crew, numbering two or three individuals, were unarmed civilians diving for shellfish. The Trump administration did not disclose the mission to key congressional leaders, a lack of notification which may have violated federal law, and the incident remained classified until the 2025 report.

== Recruitment, selection and training ==
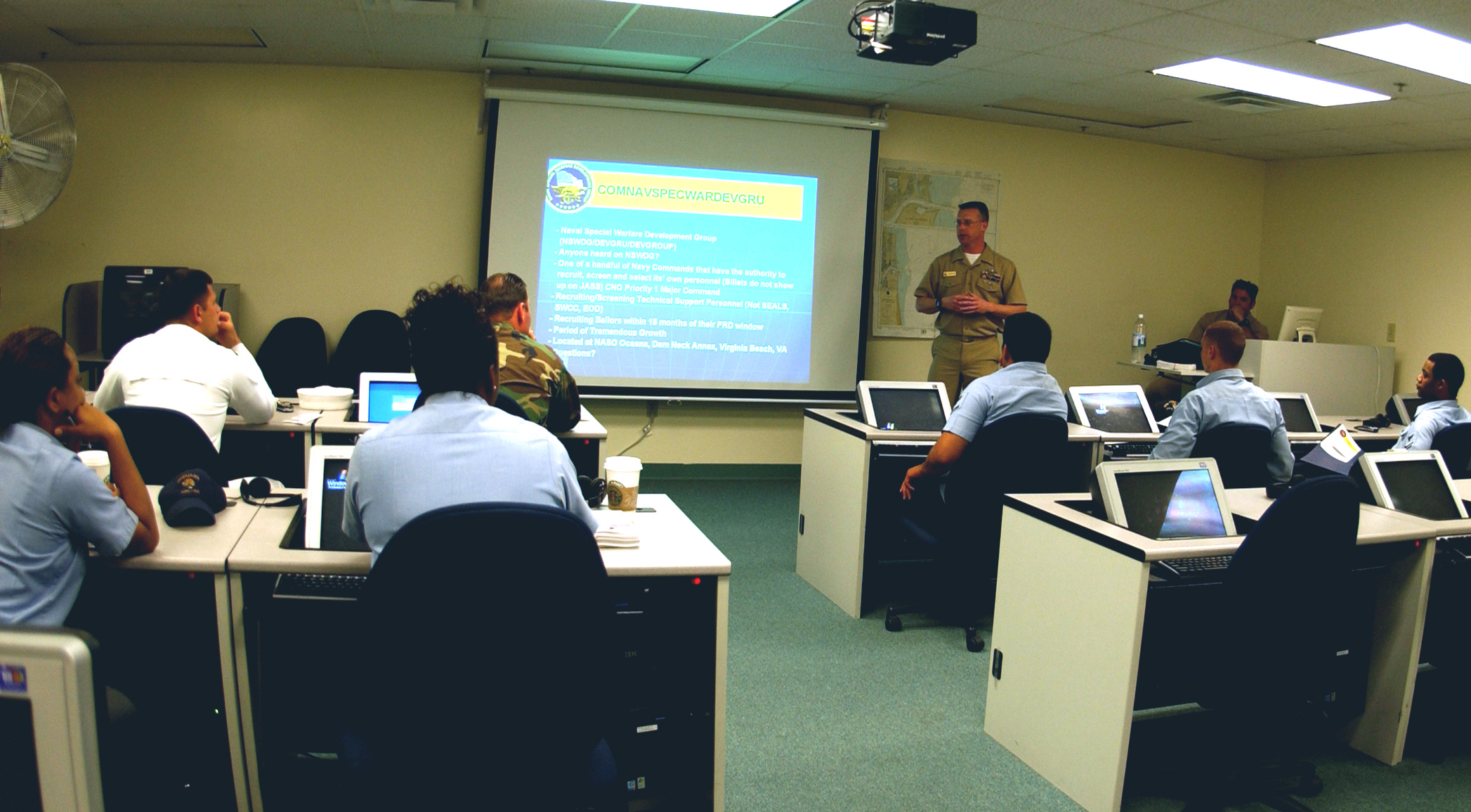
NSWDG recruiting support personnel, 2007

In the early stages of creating SEAL Team Six, Marcinko was given a six-month window to produce the team. Had he failed to do so, the project would have been canceled. Consequentially, Marcinko had little time to create a proper selection course on par with Delta Force's process. To get around this, recruits were selected after assessing their Navy records, followed by individual interviews. According to Marcinko's book Rogue Warrior, SEAL Team Six members were chosen if they had initial struggles qualifying in aspects of training, but subsequently qualified, as the determination of these candidates was seen as more valuable than a candidate that breezed through his training. Applicants came from the east coast and west coast SEAL teams and the Underwater Demolition Teams.

Although much of the training and recruitment is classified, there are some requirements and training exercises that are now public knowledge. The requirements to apply for DEVGRU states that applicants must be male, be 21 years old or older, have served at least 2 deployments on their previous assignments, and be eligible for Secret clearance. Candidates come from the East/West Coast SEAL teams, SEAL Delivery Vehicle (SDV) teams, the Special Boat teams (for Gray Squadron), the Navy explosive ordnance disposal (EOD) teams, and Navy SARCs. Enlisted candidates must be in the pay grades of E-4 through E-8 and Officer candidates need to be O-3 through O-4 to apply. Candidates must undergo physical screening, psychological testing and are then interviewed to deem whether they are suitable for assignment to NSWDG. Those who pass the stringent recruitment process will attend an eight-month selection and training course with the unit's training department known as "Green Team". The training course attrition rate is high, usually around 50%; during one selection course, out of the original 20 candidates, 12 completed the course. All candidates are watched closely by DEVGRU instructors and evaluated on whether they are suitable to join the individual squadrons. Howard E. Wasdin, a former member of SEAL Team Six said in a 2011 interview that 16 applied for SEAL Team Six selection course and two were accepted. Those who do not pass the selection phase are returned to their previous assignments and are able to try again in the future.

Like all special operations forces units that have an extremely intensive and high-risk training schedule, there can be serious injuries and deaths. SEAL Team Six/DEVGRU has lost several operators during training, including parachute accidents and close-quarters battle training accidents. It is presumed that the unit's assessment process for potential new recruits is different from what a SEAL operator experienced in his previous career, and much of the training tests the candidate's mental capacity rather than his physical condition. Every candidate chosen will have already completed their respective advanced training pipelines; Basic Underwater Demolitions/SEAL training, the Special Warfare Combatant-Craft Crewman training, Special Amphibious Reconnaissance Corpsman training, the Navy EOD training or Navy Dive School.

Candidates are put through a variety of advanced training courses led by civilian or military instructors. These can include free climbing, land warfare, advanced unarmed combat techniques, defensive and offensive advanced driving, advanced diving, communications and Survival, Evasion, Resistance and Escape training. Candidates are also taught how to pick locks on cars, doors, and safes. All candidates must perform at the top level during selection, and the unit instructors evaluate the candidate during the training process. Selected candidates are assigned to one of the Tactical Development and Evaluation Squadrons. Unlike regular SEAL Teams, SEAL Team Six operators can attend almost any other military course to receive further training depending on the unit's requirements.

Like Delta Force, live-fire marksmanship drills in both long-range and close-quarter battle drills are done with hostage roles being played by other students to help build the candidates' trust between each other.

DEVGRU regularly trains and operates with special forces units from other countries including the Australian Special Air Service Regiment, the British Special Boat Service and Canada's Joint Task Force 2.

== Structure ==
DEVGRU is divided into color-coded line squadrons:

- Red Squadron (Assault)
- Blue Squadron (Assault)
- Gold Squadron (Assault)
- Silver Squadron (Assault)
- Black Squadron (Intelligence, Reconnaissance, & Surveillance)
- Gray Squadron (Mobility Teams, Transportation/Divers, QRF)
- Green Team (Selection/Training)

Each assault squadron, usually led by a commander (O-5), is divided into three troops. Each of these troops is commanded by a senior commissioned officer, which is usually a lieutenant commander (O-4) or sometimes a lieutenant (O-3). A troop chief also serves as an adviser to the troop commander and is the highest enlisted SEAL in the troop, usually a master chief petty officer (E-9). Each troop has around 16 members which are further divided into smaller teams of enlisted SEALs, called assaulters. These individual teams of assaulters are led by senior enlisted SEALs, usually a senior chief petty officer (E-8), but sometimes a chief petty officer (E-7). The rest of these teams are filled out with more chief petty officers (E-7), petty officers first class (E-6), and petty officers second class (E-5); each member with a role.

Each assault squadron also has a specific nickname. Examples include Gold Squadron's Crusaders, Red Squadron's Indians, Blue Squadron's Pirates, Silver Squadron's Headhunters, Black Squadron's Seahorses, and Gray Squadron's Vikings. The assault squadrons are supported by a variety of support personnel, including cryptologists, communicators, explosive ordnance disposal (EOD) technicians, dog handlers, and sometimes airmen from the United States Air Force 24th Special Tactics Squadron, the Air Force's JSOC element.

According to the Government Accountability Office report on special operations forces, in the fiscal year of 2014, DEVGRU had a total of 1,787 authorized positions, of which 1,342 are military and 445 are civilian.

== Firearms ==
The following is a list of firearms known to be used by DEVGRU, but because of the unit's secretive nature, this list is not exhaustive.

Carbines

- Sons Of Liberty MK1 5.56x45mm
- Noveske 10.5" NSR 5.56×45mm 7.62x35mm
- Heckler & Koch MP7 4.6×30mm
- Colt Mk 18 CQBR 5.56×45mm
- M4A1 (various manufacturers) 5.56×45mm

Sniper and anti-materiel rifles

- Colt Mk 12 SPR 5.56×45mm
- Knight's Armament Company SR-25 7.62×51mm
- FN MK20SSR 7.62×51mm
- Remington Model 700 "Mk 13 Mod. 5" .300 Winchester Magnum
- McMillan Firearms TAC-338 .338 Lapua
- McMillan TAC-50 "Mk 15 Mod. 0" .50 BMG
- Barrett M107A1 .50 BMG

Sidearms

- Heckler & Koch HK45 "Mk 24 Mod. 0" .45 ACP
- SIG Sauer P226 "P226R Mk 25" 9×19mm
- SIG Sauer P320 9×19mm

== Commanding officers ==
Commanders of SEAL Team Six & DEVGRU
Commander	Class	Time as CO	Note
(SEAL Team Six)
Richard Marcinko	UDT/R class 26	1980 to 1983	
Robert A. Gormly	UDT/R class 31	1983 to 1986	
Thomas E. Murphy	UDT/R class 35	1986 to 1987	
(DEVGRU)
Richard Woolard	UDT/R class 38	1987 to 1990	
Ronald E. Yeaw	UDT/R class 37	1990 to 1992	
Thomas G. Moser	BUD/S class 55	1992 to 1994	
Eric T. Olson	BUD/S class 76	1994 to 1997	
H. Cobb, jr	BUD/S class 82	1990 to 1997	
Joseph D. Kernan	BUD/S class 117	1999 to 2003	
Edward G. Winters, III	BUD/S class 112	2003 to 2005	
Brian L. Losey	BUD/S class 126	2005 to 2007	
Scott P. Moore	BUD/S class 126	2007 to 2009	
Perry F. Van Hooser	BUD/S class 137	2009 to 2011	
Hugh W. Howard III	BUD/S class 172	2011 to 2013	
Frank M. Bradley	BUD/S class 179	2013 to 2015	
Jeromy B. Williams	BUD/S class 191	2015 to 2017	
Matthew J. Burns	BUD/S class 158	2018 to 2020	
Thomas A. Donavan	BUD/S class 208	2020 to 2022	
Liam M. Hulin	BUD/S class 209	2022 to 2024	

The unit's first commanding officer was a commander (O-5). Following his departure, the billet was changed to that of a captain (O-6), and remains so currently.

== Roles and responsibilities ==
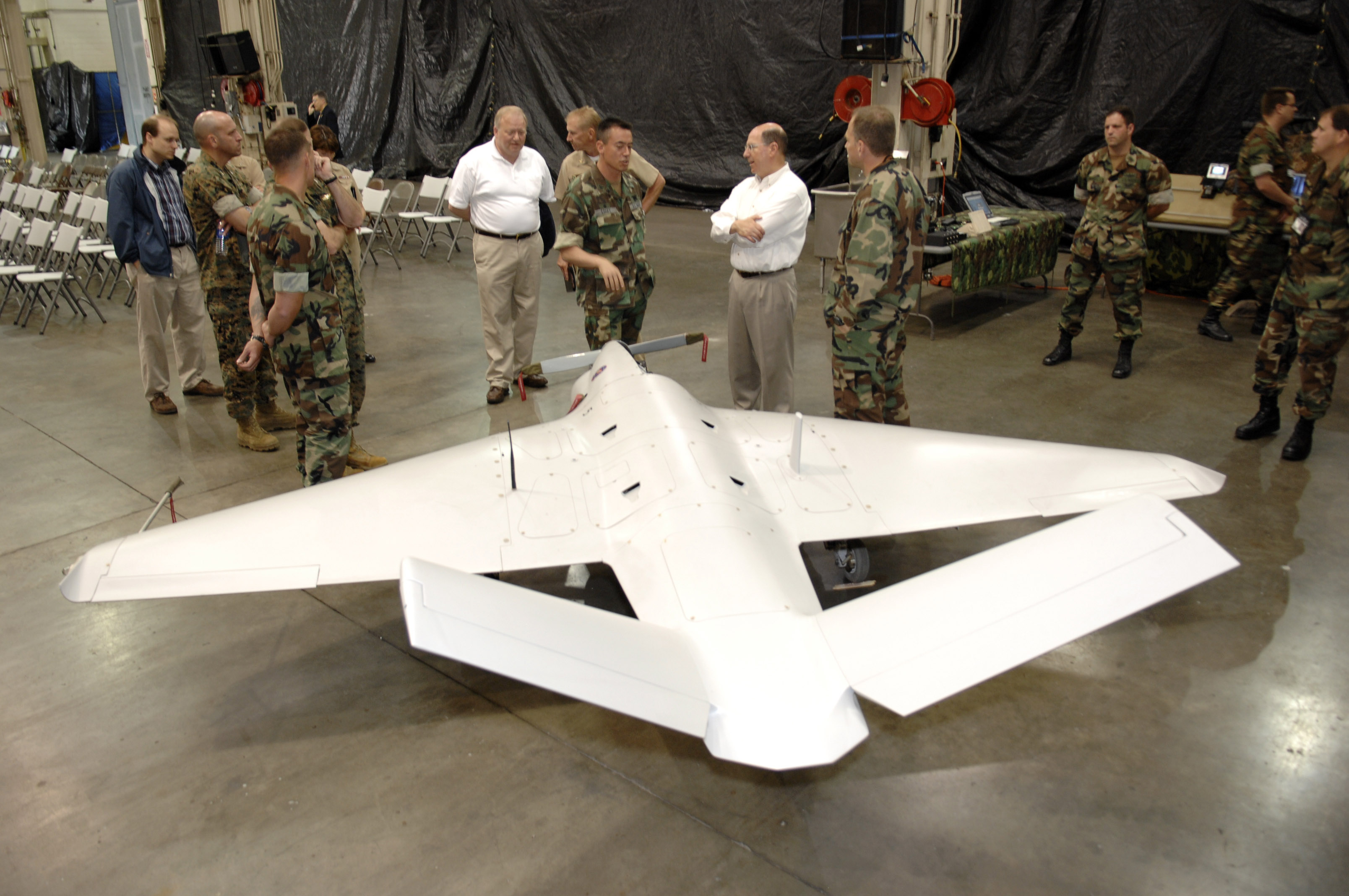
Secretary of the Navy, Donald C. Winter is briefed on the Sentry HP UAV at Dam Neck, 2007

DEVGRU's full mission is classified but is thought to include pre-emptive, pro-active counter-terrorist operations, counter-proliferation (efforts to prevent the spread of both conventional weapons and weapons of mass destruction), as well as the elimination or recovery of high-value targets from unfriendly nations. DEVGRU is one of a handful of U.S. Special Mission Units authorized in the use of pre-emptive actions against terrorists and their facilities.

When SEAL Team Six was first created in 1980, it was devoted exclusively to counter-terrorism with a worldwide maritime responsibility; its objectives typically included targets such as ships, oil rigs, naval bases, coastal embassies, and other civilian or military bases that were accessible from the sea or inland waterways. On certain operations, small teams from SEAL Team Six were tasked with covertly infiltrating international high-risk areas to carry out reconnaissance or security assessments of U.S. military facilities and embassies to give advice on improvements in order to prevent casualties in an event of a terrorist attack. SEAL Team Six was disbanded in 1987, and its role, minus non-counter-terrorism ship-boarding, which was given to the newly formed SEAL Team 8, given to the newly formed DEVGRU.

Since the start of the war on terror, DEVGRU has evolved into a multi-functional special operations unit with a worldwide operational mandate. Such operations include the successful rescue of Jessica Buchanan and Poul Hagen Thisted, the attempted rescue of Linda Norgrove, the successful rescue of American doctor Dilip Joseph and in 1991, the successful recovery of Haitian President Jean-Bertrand Aristide and his family during a coup that deposed him.

The official mission of the currently operating Naval Special Warfare Development Group mission is "to provide centralized management for the test, evaluation, and development of equipment technology and Techniques, Tactics and Procedures for Naval Special Warfare". DEVGRU and the Army's Delta Force train and deploy together on counter-terrorist missions usually as part of a joint special operations task force (JSOTF). The Central Intelligence Agency's highly secretive Special Activities Center and more specifically its elite Special Operations Group often works with, and recruits from, DEVGRU. The combination of these units led ultimately to the killing of Al-Qaeda leader Osama bin Laden in Operation Neptune Spear.

== See also ==
- Sister JSOC units
  - 1st Special Forces Operational Detachment – Delta
  - 24th Special Tactics Squadron
  - Intelligence Support Activity
  - Regimental Reconnaissance Company
- Additional SEAL articles
  - List of Navy SEALs
- Other maritime-based special operations units
  - GRUMEC (Brazil)
  - Frømandskorpset (Denmark)
  - Commandos Marine (France)
  - Kampfschwimmer (Germany)
  - MARCOS (India)
  - Shayetet 13 (Israel)
  - COMSUBIN (Italy)
  - MARSOF (Netherlands)
  - JW Formoza (Poland)
  - Special Actions Detachment (Portugal)
  - Commando Frogmen (Russia)
  - Naval Special Warfare Force (Spain)
  - Special Boat Service (UK)
  - Kustjägarna (Sweden)
  - Taifib (Indonesia)
  - Kopaska (Indonesia)
  - Denjaka (Indonesia)
  - Republic of Korea Navy Special Warfare Flotilla (South Korea)
