= Claude C. McRaven =

American football player (1918–2007)

Colonel Claude Coy "Mac" McRaven (February 23, 1918 – May 13, 2007) was a World War II fighter pilot, a colonel in the United States Air Force and an American football player who played in the National Football League and the American Football League, in 1939 and 1940, respectively.

== Early life and education ==
McRaven was born on February 23, 1918, in East St. Louis, Illinois, the son of Claude and Adah Marie Coy McRaven. As a child, he grew up in Portageville, Missouri, with his sister Corrine and brother Alvin. In high school, he lettered in track, baseball, basketball, and football, and "was a member of the state championship Portageville track team."

== College athletics ==
He received a scholarship to and attended Murray State Teachers College in Murray, Kentucky, from 1935 to 1939. While at Murray State, McRaven played football, basketball, intramural softball, and track, breaking records in football and track, and was referred to by The College News, Murray State's newspaper, as a "triple-threater". One of his nicknames was "Bullet Bill," which oftentimes was shortened to "Bill." McRaven was referred to as "Mac" by his closest friends.

He played various positions in football, including right guard, halfback (making the All-Kentucky Intercollegiate Athletic Conference second-team in his junior year), and on defense (returning a pass interception against Morehead 77 yards for a touchdown). He twice returned kickoffs for touchdowns (102 yards against Tennessee Tech as a junior and 93 yards against Middle Tennessee State University as a senior). He scored six touchdowns in the 1937–1938 season, the third highest number on the varsity team. He was inducted into the Murray State University Racers Hall of Fame in 1975 for his football exploits.

McRaven was one of 13 students who made up the first Murray State Teachers College track team. He was a sprinter and pole vaulter.

== Professional football ==
Claude “Bill” McRaven was one of the first Murray State football players to be signed by a big league football team. On February 27, 1939, The College News reported that "Claude 'Bullet Bill' McRaven signed a contract with the Cleveland Rams of the National Professional Football League."

During the 1939 pro-football season, McRaven played wingback and defensive back for the Rams, wearing number 22. He started three of the seven games he played that year and rushed for 29 yards on seven carries averaging 4.1 yards. He also caught two passes for 14 yards. McRaven was on the roster for both the St. Louis Gunners and the Cincinnati Bengals of the American Football League during the 1940 season. For the Bengals, he played halfback, wearing number 54. He started three of the four games he played that season and scored one touchdown.

== Military service ==
McRaven joined the United States Army Air Corps on January 9, 1942. He attended flight training at Brooks Field, San Antonio, Texas. After graduation, he was assigned to the 31st Pursuit Group in England, He flew Supermarine Spitfires in support of bomber missions. He also flew combat missions in North Africa, Sicily, and Italy. Among his military awards and decorations are the Distinguished Flying Cross, Air Medal with 12 Oak Leaf Clusters, and four European Campaign medals.

He retired from the United States Air Force on October 31, 1967, after serving in World War II, Korean War, and Vietnam War.

== Post-military career ==
McRaven worked a brief time for the San Antonio's Model Cities Program and then became the city's labor relations negotiator.

== Personal life ==
McRaven met Anna Elizabeth Long, his wife of forty years, on a blind date while stationed in Victoria, Texas. They had two daughters and a son, retired United States Navy four-star Admiral William H. McRaven. He died in San Antonio on May 13, 2007.
