= List of Donald Trump nominees who have withdrawn =

The Trump administration proposed a number of nominees to appointed positions who were rejected by the Senate or withdrew voluntarily.

== Executive Office of the President ==
Office	Nominee	Experience	Announced	Withdrawn
White House Director of Communications	Jason Miller	Vice-President at Jamestown Associates	December 22, 2016	December 24, 2016
Director of Strategic Communications for the National Security Council	Monica Crowley	Political commentator	December 15, 2016	January 16, 2017
Chairwoman of the Council on Environmental Quality	Kathleen Hartnett White	Senior Fellow at the Texas Public Policy Foundation	October 12, 2017	February 5, 2018
Director of the Office of National Drug Control Policy	Tom Marino	Representative from Pennsylvania	September 5, 2017	October 17, 2017

== Department of Agriculture ==
Office	Nominee	Experience	Announced	Withdrawn
Under Secretary of Agriculture (Research, Education, and Economics)	Sam Clovis	Senior White House adviser to the senior White House Adviser to the USDA	July 25, 2017	November 2, 2017

== Department of Commerce ==
Office	Nominee	Announced	Withdrawn
Deputy Secretary of Commerce	Todd Ricketts	November 30, 2016	April 19, 2017
Under Secretary of Commerce (Oceans and Atmosphere)	Barry Lee Myers	October 12, 2017	November 20, 2019
Assistant Secretary of Commerce (Export Enforcement)	Jeffrey Nadaner	February 5, 2018	June 12, 2019

== Department of Defense ==
Office	Nominee	Announced	Withdrawn
Secretary of Defense	Patrick M. Shanahan	May 9, 2019	June 18, 2019
Assistant Secretary of Defense for Health Affairs	Dean Winslow	September 2017	January 2018
General Counsel of the Air Force	David Ehrhart	June 23, 2017	September 29, 2017
Secretary of the Army	Vincent Viola	December 19, 2016	February 3, 2017
Secretary of the Army	Mark E. Green	April 7, 2017	May 5, 2017
General Counsel of the Army	Ryan Dean Newman	March 21, 2017	September 29, 2017
Secretary of the Navy	Philip Bilden	January 25, 2017	February 26, 2017
Under Secretary of Defense (Comptroller)	Elaine McCusker	November 6, 2019	March 2, 2020
Deputy Under Secretary of Defense for Personnel and Readiness	Anthony Kurta	July 19, 2017	September 28, 2018
Deputy Under Secretary of Defense for Personnel and Readiness	J. David Patterson	January 6, 2020	February 12, 2020
Under Secretary of the Air Force	Shon J. Manasco	April 24, 2020	December 30, 2020

== Department of Education ==
Office	Nominee	Announced	Withdrawn
Assistant Secretary of Education (Career, Technical, and Adult Education)	Tim Kelly	27 August 2017	18 November 2017

== Department of Energy ==
Office	Nominee	Announced	Withdrawn
General Counsel of Energy	David Jonas	May 23, 2017	January 3, 2018

== Department of Health and Human Services ==
Office	Nominee	Announced	Withdrawn
Director of the Indian Health Service	Robert M. Weaver	October 6, 2017	February 21, 2018
Director of the Centers for Disease Control and Prevention	David Weldon	November 2024	March 2025
Surgeon General	Janette Nesheiwat	November 2024	May 2025

== Department of Homeland Security ==
Office	Nominee	Announced	Withdrawn
Secretary of Homeland Security	Chad Wolf	August 25, 2020	January 6, 2021
Assistant Secretary of Homeland Security (Partnership & Engagement)	David Clarke	May 17, 2017	June 17, 2017
Administrator of the Federal Emergency Management Agency	Jeffrey Byard	May 13, 2019	September 19, 2019
Deputy Administrator of the Federal Emergency Management Agency	Daniel Alan Craig	July 25, 2017	September 13, 2017
Chief Financial Officer of Homeland Security	Charles E. Cook III	February 2, 2018	June 7, 2018
Director of U.S. Immigration and Customs Enforcement	Thomas Homan	November 14, 2017	May 15, 2018
Director of U.S. Immigration and Customs Enforcement	Ronald Vitiello	August 6, 2018	April 4, 2019

== Department of the Interior ==
Office	Nominee	Announced	Withdrawn
Solicitor of the Interior	Ryan D. Nelson	July 31, 2017	May 10, 2018, and nominated instead for Circuit Judge of the Ninth Circuit
Director of the Office of Surface Mining	J. Steven Gardner	January 8, 2018	September 12, 2018
Director of the Bureau of Land Management	William Perry Pendley	June 26, 2020	September 8, 2020
Director of the Bureau of Land Management	Kathleen Sgamma	February 12, 2025	April 10, 2025

== Department of Justice ==
Office	Nominee	Announced	Withdrawn
Associate Attorney General	Jessie K. Liu	March 5, 2019	March 28, 2019
Director of the Bureau of Alcohol, Tobacco, Firearms, and Explosives	Chuck Canterbury	May 24, 2019	May 19, 2020
Attorney General	Matt Gaetz	November, 2024	November 21, 2024
United States Attorney for the District of Columbia	Ed Martin	January, 2025 (appointed Interim U.S. Attorney)	May 8, 2025

== Department of Labor ==
Office	Nominee	Announced	Withdrawn
Secretary of Labor	Andrew Puzder	December 8, 2016	February 15, 2017
Assistant Secretary of Labor (Occupational Safety and Health)	Scott Mugno	November 1, 2017	May 23, 2019

== Department of State ==
Office	Nominee	Announced	Withdrawn
Under Secretary of State (Management)	Eric Ueland	June 9, 2017	June 18, 2018
Under Secretary of State (Civilian Security, Democracy, and Human Rights)	Eric Ueland	July 29, 2020	December 30, 2020
Director General of the United States Foreign Service	Stephen Akard	October 10, 2017	March 20, 2018 and nominated instead for Director of the Office of Foreign Missions
Assistant Secretary of State (East Asian and Pacific Affairs)	Susan Thornton	December 19, 2017	August 16, 2018
Assistant Secretary of State (South and Central Asian Affairs)	Robert Williams	December 12, 2018	April 11, 2019
Ambassador to Australia	Harry B. Harris Jr.	February 9, 2018	May 23, 2018 and nominated instead for United States Ambassador to South Korea
Ambassador to the Bahamas	Doug Manchester	May 15, 2017	November 13, 2019
Ambassador to Belgium	Jamie McCourt	June 22, 2017	August 2, 2017 and nominated instead for United States Ambassador to France
Ambassador to Chile	Andrew Gellert	January 4, 2018	August 16, 2018
Ambassador to Estonia	Edward Masso	September 2, 2017	May 24, 2018
Ambassador to Singapore	K. T. McFarland	May 19, 2017	January 2018
Ambassador to South Korea	Victor Cha	December 2017	January 2018
Ambassador to the United Nations	Heather Nauert	December 2018	February 2019
Representative of the United States on the Economic and Social Council of the United Nations	Jennifer Barber	December 9, 2019	September 8, 2020
Alternate Representative to the United Nations General Assembly	Jennifer Barber	December 9, 2019	September 8, 2020
Alternate Representative of the United States to the United Nations (Special Political Affairs)	Austin M. Smith	August 2018	Returned to President Trump by Senate in January 2019, replaced by nomination of Alex Wong in February 2020
Alternate Representative to the United Nations General Assembly	Austin M. Smith	August 2018	Returned to President Trump by Senate in January 2019, replaced by nomination of Alex Wong in February 2020
Representative to the Organization for Economic Cooperation and Development	Pamela Bates	September 2018	Returned to President Trump by Senate in January 2020, replaced by nomination of Manisha Singh in April 2020
Ambassador to the United Nations	Elise Stefanik	November 11, 2024	March 27, 2025

== Department of Transportation ==
Office	Nominee	Announced	Withdrawn
Administrator of the Federal Highway Administration	Paul Trombino III	September 8, 2017	December 8, 2017
Administrator of the National Highway Traffic Safety Administration	Heidi King	April 5, 2018	September 19, 2019

== Department of the Treasury ==
Office	Nominee	Announced	Withdrawn
Deputy Secretary of the Treasury	Jim Donovan	March 14, 2017	May 19, 2017
Under Secretary of the Treasury (Terrorism and Financial Crimes)	Jessie K. Liu	January 6, 2020	February 12, 2020
Assistant Secretary of the Treasury (International Finance)	Adam Lerrick	March 14, 2017	May 10, 2018
Chairperson of the Board of Directors of the Federal Deposit Insurance Corporation	James Clinger	June 16, 2017	July 12, 2017

== Department of Veterans Affairs ==
Office	Nominee	Announced	Withdrawn
Secretary of Veterans Affairs	Ronny Jackson	March 28, 2018	June 20, 2018

== Central Intelligence Agency ==
Office	Nominee	Announced	Withdrawn
Inspector General of the Central Intelligence Agency	Christopher Sharpley	September 5, 2017	July 23, 2018

== Environmental Protection Agency ==
Office	Nominee	Announced	Withdrawn
Assistant Administrator of the Environmental Protection Agency for Toxic Substances	Michael Dourson	July 2017	December 13, 2017

== Office of the Director of National Intelligence ==
Office	Nominee	Announced	Withdrawn
Director of National Intelligence	John Ratcliffe	July 28, 2019	August 2, 2019

== Independent agencies ==
Office	Nominee	Announced	Withdrawn
Director of the Office of Personnel Management	George Nesterczuk	May 24, 2017	August 2, 2017
President of the Export–Import Bank of the United States	Scott Garrett	Rejected by Senate Banking Committee vote	
First Vice President of the Export–Import Bank of the United States	Kimberly A. Reed	September 15, 2017	June 20, 2018, and nominated instead for President of the Export–Import Bank of the United States
Assistant Administrator of the United States Agency for International Development (Africa)	Johnathan Miller	January 12, 2018	March 20, 2018
Assistant Administrator of the United States Agency for International Development (Democracy, Conflict, and Humanitarian Assistance)	Mark Montgomery	June 20, 2018	November 15, 2018
Assistant Administrator of the United States Agency for International Development (Asia)	Mina Chang	September 13, 2018	September 9, 2019
Member of the Board of Governors of the United States Postal Service	Calvin R. Tucker	October 26, 2017	March 5, 2019
Member of the Merit Systems Protection Board	Andrew Maunz	March 5, 2018	February 12, 2019
Chair of the Consumer Product Safety Commission	Ann Marie Buerkle	July 24, 2017	June 18, 2019
Inspector General of the Tennessee Valley Authority	Katherine A. Crytzer	April 3, 2020	September 22, 2020, and nominated instead for District Judge for the Eastern District of Tennessee

== Federal judges ==
Nominee	Announced	Withdrawn
Damien Schiff	May 8, 2017	January 3, 2018
Thomas Alvin Farr	July 13, 2017	January 3, 2019
Ryan Bounds	September 7, 2017	July 2018
Jeff Mateer	September 7, 2017	December 2017
Matthew S. Petersen	September 7, 2017	December 16, 2017
Brett Talley	September 7, 2017	December 13, 2017
Gordon P. Giampietro	December 20, 2017	January 3, 2019
Maureen Ohlhausen	January 23, 2018	December 2018
Jon Katchen	April 10, 2018	August 2018
John M. O'Connor	April 10, 2018	April 12, 2019
Thomas Marcelle	November 13, 2018	September 19, 2019
Michael S. Bogren	March 11, 2019	June 26, 2019
Kevin R. Sweazea	June 12, 2019	January 3, 2020
Halil Suleyman Ozerden	June 24, 2019	January 3, 2020
Daniel Z. Epstein	June 19, 2019	December 17, 2020, and nominated instead for Chairman of the Administrative Conference of the United States

== See also ==
- List of Trump administration dismissals and resignations
- List of short-tenure Donald Trump political appointments
