= Appointees who have resigned from the Trump administration =

Appointees who have resigned from the Trump administration may refer to:

- List of dismissals and resignations in the first Trump administration
- List of dismissals and resignations in the second Trump administration
- List of Donald Trump nominees who have withdrawn
