= List of dismissals and resignations in the first Trump administration =

Many political appointees of Donald Trump, the 45th and 47th president of the United States, resigned or were dismissed during Trump's first term. Multiple publications have called attention to the record-setting turnover rate in the first year of that term. Several Trump appointees, including National Security Advisor Michael Flynn, White House Chief of Staff Reince Priebus, White House Communications Director Anthony Scaramucci, and Secretary of Health and Human Services Tom Price have had the shortest service tenures in the history of their respective offices. (Note: Excluding interim appointments.)

Trump articulated the reasons for the break in custom, saying: "We have acting people. The reason they are acting is because I'm seeing how I like them, and I'm liking a lot of them very, very much. There are people who have done a bad job, and I let them go. If you call that turmoil, I don't call that turmoil. I say that is being smart. That's what we do."

For comprehensiveness, the list below includes, in addition to dismissals and resignations, routine job changes such as promotions (e.g., Gina Haspel from CIA Deputy Director to Director), officials moving to a comparable position (e.g., John F. Kelly from Secretary of Homeland Security to Chief of Staff), and acting or temporary officials being replaced by permanent ones. The list does not include many lower-level positions, however, such as that of executive director of the United States Interagency Council on Homelessness, Matthew Doherty, whom Trump dismissed in November 2019, without a replacement to lead the council that was created in 1987. But some less prominent officials are listed because their departure was newsworthy.

Officials who resigned in the aftermath of the January 6 United States Capitol attack, well into the then-underway presidential transition of Trump's successor Joe Biden, when their term would have ended soon anyway, are also listed on this page.

== Color key ==
Color key:

Denotes appointees serving in an acting capacity.

Denotes appointees to an office which has since been abolished

== Department of Veterans Affairs ==
Office	Name	Took office	Left office	Notes
Secretary of Veterans Affairs	Robert Snyder	January 20, 2017	February 14, 2017	
Secretary of Veterans Affairs	David Shulkin	February 14, 2017	March 28, 2018	On March 28, 2018, Trump announced on Twitter that Shulkin had been fired. Following his dismissal, controversy erupted about efforts by the White House to privatize VA healthcare and Shulkin's allegedly inappropriate taxpayer-funded foreign trips.
Secretary of Veterans Affairs	Robert Wilkie	March 28, 2018	May 29, 2018	
Secretary of Veterans Affairs	Peter O'Rourke	May 29, 2018	July 30, 2018	
Deputy Secretary of Veterans Affairs	Gina Farrisee	January 20, 2017	February 25, 2017	
Deputy Secretary of Veterans Affairs	Scott Blackburn	February 26, 2017	August 9, 2017	
Deputy Secretary of Veterans Affairs	Thomas G. Bowman	August 10, 2017	June 15, 2018	Retired.
Deputy Secretary of Veterans Affairs	James Byrne	September 16, 2019	February 3, 2020	
General Counsel of Veterans Affairs	James Byrne	August 8, 2017	September 16, 2019	
Under Secretary of Veterans Affairs (Health)	Poonam Alaigh	May 2017	September 25, 2017	
Assistant Secretary of Veterans Affairs (Human Resources and Administration)	Peter Shelby	February 24, 2018	Summer 2018	Retired.
Assistant Secretary of Veterans Affairs (Operations, Security and Preparedness)	Donald P. Loren	February 24, 2018	Summer 2018	Retired.

== Intelligence community ==
Office	Name	Took office	Left office	Notes
Director of the Central Intelligence Agency	Meroe Park	January 20, 2017	January 23, 2017	
Director of the Central Intelligence Agency	Mike Pompeo	January 23, 2017	April 26, 2018	Became Secretary of State.
Deputy Director of the Central Intelligence Agency	Gina Haspel	February 2, 2017	May 21, 2018	Became Director of the Central Intelligence Agency.
Director of National Intelligence	Dan Coats	March 16, 2017	August 15, 2019	
Director of National Intelligence	Joseph Maguire	August 16, 2019	February 21, 2020	
Director of the National Counterterrorism Center	Joseph Maguire	December 27, 2018	August 16, 2019	
Director of the National Counterterrorism Center	Russell Travers	December 24, 2017	December 27, 2018	
Director of the National Counterterrorism Center	Russell Travers	August 16, 2019	March 18, 2020	
Deputy Director of the National Counterterrorism Center	Russell Travers	November 13, 2017	March 18, 2020	
Director of National Intelligence	Richard Grenell	February 20, 2020	May 26, 2020	Grenell was also Ambassador to Germany.
Principal Deputy Director of National Intelligence	Susan M. Gordon	September 5, 2017	August 15, 2019	Gordon leaving along with Coats cleared the way for Trump to appoint Maguire as acting DNI. (Note: Coats or Gordon may be the "senior national security official" who told Jake Tapper: "Everyone at this point ignores what the president says and just does their job. The American people should take some measure of confidence in that.")
Principal Deputy Director of National Intelligence	Andrew P. Hallman	October 30, 2019	February 21, 2020	
Chief Operating Officer of the Office of the Director of National Intelligence	Deirdre Walsh	February 2018	May 8, 2020	
General Counsel of the Office of the Director of National Intelligence	Jason Klitenic	August 6, 2018	March 2020	
Inspector General of the Intelligence Community	Michael Atkinson	May 17, 2018	April 2020	Fired by Trump after raising concerns from a whistleblower that led to Trump's impeachment

== Independent agencies ==
Office	Name	Took office	Left office	Notes
Chairman of the Securities and Exchange Commission	Jay Clayton	May 4, 2017	December 31, 2020	
Chairman of the Commodity Futures Trading Commission	J. Christopher Giancarlo	August 3, 2017	April 13, 2019	
Director of the Consumer Financial Protection Bureau	Richard Cordray	January 4, 2012	November 24, 2017	After President Trump was inaugurated, he and Office of Management and Budget Director Mick Mulvaney worked to undermine Cordray and the CFPB.
Director of the Consumer Financial Protection Bureau	Mick Mulvaney	November 25, 2017	December 11, 2018	
Deputy Director of the Consumer Financial Protection Bureau	David Silberman	January 11, 2016	November 24, 2017	
Deputy Director of the Consumer Financial Protection Bureau	Leandra English	November 24, 2017	July 9, 2018	
Chief of External Affairs for the Corporation for National and Community Service	Carl Higbie	August 2017	January 19, 2018	Resigned in January 2018 after racist, sexist, anti-Muslim and anti-LGBT comments, and comments about fellow veterans with PTSD, came to light.
Administrator of the Environmental Protection Agency	Scott Pruitt	February 17, 2017	July 9, 2018	Resignation tendered July 5, to be effective Friday, July 6, when the Deputy Administrator became Acting Administrator.
Deputy Administrator of the Environmental Protection Agency	Andrew R. Wheeler	April 20, 2018	February 28, 2019	Became EPA Administrator.
Assistant Administrator of the Environmental Protection Agency for Air and Radiation	William Wehrum	November 20, 2017	June 30, 2019	
General Counsel of the Environmental Protection Agency	Matthew Leopold	January 8, 2018	October 5, 2020	
Commissioner of the Federal Communications Commission	Mignon Clyburn	August 3, 2009	June 2018	Retired.
Chairman of the National Labor Relations Board	Philip A. Miscimarra	January 23, 2017	April 23, 2017	
Chairman of the National Labor Relations Board	Philip A. Miscimarra	April 24, 2017	December 16, 2017	
Member of the National Mediation Board	Linda Puchala	November 2, 2017	July 1, 2018	
Director of the Office of Government Ethics	Walter Shaub	January 9, 2013	July 19, 2017	Shaub was outspoken with concerns about the Trump Administration during the transition period and after Trump's inauguration. Shaub resigned six months before the end of his term, saying that ethics rules should be tighter.
Director of the Office of Personnel Management	Jeff Tien Han Pon	March 9, 2018	October 5, 2018	
Director of the Office of Personnel Management	Margaret Weichert	October 5, 2018	September 16, 2019	
Director of the Office of Personnel Management	Dale Cabaniss	September 16, 2019	March 17, 2020	
President and CEO of the Overseas Private Investment Corporation	Ray Washburne	September 5, 2017	March 1, 2019	
Director of the Federal Housing Finance Agency	Mel Watt	January 6, 2014	January 6, 2019	
Administrator of the Small Business Administration	Joseph Loddo	January 20, 2017	February 14, 2017	
Administrator of the Small Business Administration	Linda McMahon	February 14, 2017	April 12, 2019	In March 2019, the former WWE executive announced she was leaving the SBA to work for the America First Action SuperPAC.
Administrator of the Small Business Administration	Chris Pilkerton	April 13, 2019	January 13, 2020	Pilkerton was also the General Counsel of the SBA from June 2017 to March 2020.
Deputy Administrator of the Small Business Administration	Althea Coetzee	August 3, 2017	April 15, 2018	
Commissioner of the Federal Election Commission	Ann M. Ravel	October 25, 2013	March 1, 2017	
Commissioner of the Federal Election Commission	Lee E. Goodman	October 22, 2013	February 16, 2018	
Commissioner of the Federal Election Commission	Matthew S. Petersen	June 24, 2008	August 31, 2019	
Commissioner of the Federal Election Commission	Caroline C. Hunter	June 24, 2008	July 3, 2020	
United States Postmaster General	Megan Brennan	February 1, 2015	June 15, 2020	
Deputy United States Postmaster General	Ronald Stroman	March 2011	June 1, 2020	
Administrator of the United States Agency for International Development	Mark Green	August 7, 2017	April 10, 2020	
Deputy Administrator of the United States Agency for International Development	Bonnie Glick	January 2019	November 6, 2020	Terminated without cause by the Trump Administration hours before acting Administrator John Barsa reached the maximum amount of time allowed to serve in that position without Senate confirmation under the Federal Vacancies Reform Act of 1998.
Deputy White House Liaison of the United States Agency for International Development	Merritt Corrigan	June 2020	August 3, 2020	Forced out after a history of anti-LGBTQ comments soon after starting in the role.
NASA Associate Administrator (Human Exploration and Operations)	William Gerstenmaier	August 12, 2005	July 10, 2019	
NASA Associate Administrator (Human Exploration and Operations)	Ken Bowersox	July 10, 2019	October 16, 2019	
NASA Associate Administrator (Human Exploration and Operations)	Douglas L. Loverro	October 16, 2019	May 19, 2020	Bowersox returned as Acting Associate Administrator.
Director of the Voice of America	Amanda Bennett	March 2016	June 15, 2020	
Director of Middle East Broadcasting Networks	Alberto Fernandez	July 2017	June 17, 2020	Fired by Michael Pack, the new CEO of the U.S. Agency for Global Media
President of Radio Free Europe/Radio Liberty	Jamie Fly	August 1, 2019	June 17, 2020	Fired by Michael Pack, the new CEO of the U.S. Agency for Global Media
President of Radio Free Asia	Bay Fang	November 20, 2019	June 17, 2020	Fired by Michael Pack, the new CEO of the U.S. Agency for Global Media
Chairman of Tennessee Valley Authority	James "Skip" Thompson	May 2019	August 3, 2020	Fired after TVA announced that 200 American workers would be replaced with cheaper foreign workers. That decision was reversed on August 6.

== Banks ==
Office	Name	Took office	Left office	Notes
Governor of the African Development Bank	Geoffrey Okamoto	March 2018		
Governor of the European Bank for Reconstruction and Development	Geoffrey Okamoto	March 2018		

== In the aftermath of the 2021 Capitol attack ==
Dozens of Trump administration officeholders resigned in reaction to the Capitol storming, even though their terms in office would expire fourteen days later with the inauguration of President Biden. Some senior officials, however, decided against resigning in order to ensure an orderly transition of power to the incoming Biden administration.

Office	Name	Took office	Left office	Notes
United States Special Envoy for Northern Ireland	Mick Mulvaney	May 1, 2020	January 6, 2021	Former White House Chief of Staff under Trump (2019–2020).
Chief of Staff to the First Lady	Stephanie Grisham	April 7, 2020	January 6, 2021	
White House Deputy Press Secretary	Sarah Matthews	June 2020	January 6, 2021	
White House Social Secretary	Rickie Niceta	February 8, 2017	January 6, 2021	
United States Secretary of Transportation	Elaine Chao	January 31, 2017	January 7, 2021	Became the first cabinet member to announce her resignation, effective on January 11; was criticized by US Senator Elizabeth Warren (D-MA) for resigning rather than voting to invoke the 25th Amendment to remove Trump from office.
Assistant Secretary of Health and Human Services for Mental Health and Substance Use	Elinore F. McCance-Katz	September 11, 2017	January 7, 2021	
Chair of the Council of Economic Advisers	Tyler Goodspeed	June 23, 2020	January 7, 2021	
Deputy Assistant Secretary for Intelligence and Security in the Commerce Department	John Costello		January 7, 2021	
United States Secretary of Education	Betsy DeVos	February 7, 2017	January 8, 2021	Was criticized by US Senator Elizabeth Warren (D-MA) for resigning rather than voting to invoke the 25th Amendment to remove Trump from office.
United States Assistant Attorney General for the Civil Rights Division	Eric Dreiband	October 12, 2018	January 8, 2021	
Acting United States Secretary of Homeland Security	Chad Wolf	November 13, 2019	January 11, 2021	
Senior GOP aide on the House Armed Services Committee	Jason Schmid		January 12, 2021	
United States Secretary of Health and Human Services	Alex Azar	January 29, 2018	January 20, 2021	
White House Deputy Chief of Staff	Chris Liddell	March 19, 2018	January 20, 2021	

Three members of the National Security Council resigned prematurely.

Office	Name	Took office	Left office	Notes
United States Principal Deputy National Security Advisor	Matthew Pottinger	September 22, 2019	January 7, 2021	
Senior Director on Russian and European Affairs for the National Security Council	Ryan Tully		January 7, 2021	
United States National Security Advisor	Robert C. O'Brien	September 18, 2019	January 20, 2021	

Five senior officials at the Federal Aviation Administration (FAA) resigned in protest.

Office	Name	Took office	Left office	Notes
Chief Counsel, Acting Deputy FAA Administrator	Arjun Garg		January 7, 2021	
Assistant Administrator for Communications	Brianna Manzelli		January 7, 2021	
Associate Administrator for Airports	Kirk Shaffer	July 29, 2015	January 7, 2021	
Assistant Administrator for Policy, International Affairs and Environment	Bailey Edwards		January 7, 2021	
Governmental Affairs Adviser, Acting Assistant Administrator for Government and Industry Affairs	Andrew Giacini		January 7, 2021	

== See also ==
- Hiring and personnel concerns about Donald Trump
- List of Donald Trump nominees who have withdrawn
- List of short-tenure Donald Trump political appointments

== External references ==
- Brookings Institution: Tracking turnover in the Trump administration (Jan. 2021)
- ABC News: A list of officials who have left the Trump administration (2018)
