= List of short-tenure Donald Trump political appointments =

This is a list of notably short political appointments by Donald Trump, the 45th and 47th president of the United States.

The turnover rate in the first Trump administration has been noted by various publications. Several Trump appointees, including Michael Flynn, Reince Priebus, Anthony Scaramucci, and Tom Price, have among the shortest service tenures in the history of their respective offices. (Note: Excluding interim appointments.)

This list excludes political appointees, White House staff and other officials of the federal government from previous administrations who left or were dismissed from their positions under Trump (such as James Comey or Sally Yates).

== List ==
Portrait	Name	Office	Took office	Left office	Tenure	Preceded by	Succeeded by	Notes
	Steve Bannon	Senior Counselor to the President	January 20, 2017	August 18, 2017	210 days (6 months, 29 days)	John Podesta	Kellyanne Conway; Dina Powell	Previously executive chairman of Breitbart News, a position he briefly resumed following his resignation August 18.
	Steve Bannon	White House Chief Strategist	January 20, 2017	August 18, 2017	210 days (6 months, 29 days)	Position established	Vacant	Previously executive chairman of Breitbart News, a position he briefly resumed following his resignation August 18.
	Michael Dubke	White House Communications Director	March 6, 2017	June 2, 2017	88 days (2 months, 27 days)	Sean Spicer (acting)	Sean Spicer (acting)	Previously a Republican political strategist. Submitted his resignation May 30, 2017. His tenure was the fourth-shortest in the office's history, excluding interim appointments.
	Brenda Fitzgerald	Director of the Centers for Disease Control and Prevention	July 7, 2017	January 31, 2018	208 days (6 months, 24 days)	Anne Schuchat (acting)	Anne Schuchat (acting)	Previously commissioner of the Georgia Department of Public Health. Resigned due to scrutiny of her financial holdings, which included stock in Japan Tobacco. Her tenure was the shortest in the office's history, excluding interim appointments.
	Michael Flynn	National Security Advisor	January 20, 2017	February 13, 2017	24 days	Susan Rice	H. R. McMaster	Previously a three-star general and director of the Defense Intelligence Agency. Resigned after misleading Vice President Mike Pence about the nature and content of his communications with Ambassador Sergey Kislyak. Later pled guilty to making false statements to the FBI. His tenure was the shortest in the office's history.
	Sebastian Gorka	Deputy Assistant to the President	January 20, 2017	August 25, 2017	217 days (7 months, 5 days)			Previously a military and intelligence analyst. Failed to obtain the security clearance necessary for work on national security issues. Resigned August 25, 2017.
	Derek Harvey	Member of the National Security Council	January 27, 2017	July 27, 2017	181 days (6 months)			Previously a United States Army colonel and a senior member of the Defense Intelligence Agency. Fired July 27, 2017.
	K. T. McFarland	Deputy National Security Advisor	January 20, 2017	May 19, 2017	119 days (3 months, 29 days)	Avril Haines	Ricky L. Waddell	Previously a member of the National Security Council in the 1970s and a Republican Senate candidate. Reported not to be a good fit at the NSC, she resigned after less than four months. Trump nominated her to be Ambassador to Singapore, but her nomination stalled and was withdrawn.
	Dina Powell	Deputy National Security Advisor for Strategy	March 15, 2017	January 12, 2018	303 days (9 months, 28 days)	Position established	Nadia Schadlow	Previously an Assistant to the President for Presidential Personnel under George W. Bush. Left the Trump administration in January 2018.
	Tom Price	Secretary of Health and Human Services	February 10, 2017	September 29, 2017	231 days (7 months, 19 days)	Sylvia Mathews Burwell	Alex Azar	Previously U.S. Representative for Georgia's 6th congressional district. Resigned following scrutiny of his use of private charters and military aircraft for travel. His tenure was the shortest in the office's history.
	Reince Priebus	White House Chief of Staff	January 20, 2017	July 31, 2017	192 days (6 months, 11 days)	Denis McDonough	John F. Kelly	Previously chairman of the Republican National Committee. Submitted his resignation July 27, 2017. His tenure was the shortest in the office's history, excluding interim appointments.
	Scott Pruitt	Administrator of the Environmental Protection Agency	February 17, 2017	July 6, 2018	504 days (1 year, 4 months, 19 days)	Gina McCarthy	Andrew R. Wheeler	Previously Oklahoma Attorney General and a state senator. A self-described "leading advocate against the EPA's activist agenda," Pruitt rejects the scientific consensus that human-caused carbon dioxide emissions are a primary contributor to climate change. His tenure was marked by controversy and at least a dozen federal inquiries into his spending and management habits. Announced his resignation July 5. His tenure was the second-shortest in the office's history, excluding interim appointments. (Note: Behind only Mike Leavitt, who stepped down 447 days into his term to succeed Tommy Thompson as Secretary of Health and Human Services.)
	David Shulkin	Secretary of Veterans Affairs	February 14, 2017	March 28, 2018	407 days (1 year, 1 month, 14 days)	Bob McDonald	Robert Wilkie (acting)	Previously a physician and later Under Secretary of Veterans Affairs for Health. Confirmed unanimously, but clashed with staffers and attracted scrutiny of his travel expenses. Fired March 28, 2018. His tenure was the shortest in the office's history, excluding interim appointments.
	George Sifakis	Director of the Office of Public Liaison	March 6, 2017	September 25, 2017	203 days (6 months, 19 days)	Valerie Jarrett (Note: as Director of the Office of Public Engagement and Intergovernmental Affairs.)	Johnny DeStefano	Left after less than seven months.
	Anthony Scaramucci	White House Communications Director	July 21, 2017	July 31, 2017	10 days	Sean Spicer	Hope Hicks	Previously designated director of the White House Office of Public Liaison and Intergovernmental Affairs but did not assume office due to pending United States Office of Government Ethics investigation. Fired July 31, 2017. His tenure was the shortest in the office's history, breaking the former record held by Jack Koehler.
	Sean Spicer	White House Press Secretary	January 20, 2017	July 21, 2017	182 days (6 months, 1 day)	Josh Earnest	Sarah Huckabee Sanders	Previously acting White House Communications Director and a Republican Party strategist. Announced his resignation July 21, 2017, although he remained at the White House in an unspecified capacity until August 31. His tenure was the sixth-shortest in the office's history. (Note: Excluding interim appointments. Also excludes James Brady, who was permanently disabled by a gunshot wound 69 days into his tenure, and George Stephanopoulos, who briefed the press during his tenure as Communications Director though the title formally belonged to Dee Dee Myers.)
	Rex Tillerson	United States Secretary of State	February 1, 2017	March 13, 2018 (Note: Formally retained the title until March 31, though his duties were carried out by successor John Sullivan.)	405 days (1 year, 1 month, 12 days)	John Kerry	John Sullivan (acting)	Previously CEO of ExxonMobil. Fired March 13, 2018. His tenure was the fifteenth-shortest in the office's 228-year history, and the third-shortest since World War II. (Note: Excluding interim appointments. Behind Edmund Muskie and Lawrence Eagleburger.) Tillerson is the only Secretary of State since at least 1945 to have been fired.
	Katie Walsh	White House Deputy Chief of Staff for Implementation	January 20, 2017	March 30, 2017	69 days (2 months, 10 days)	Kristie Canegallo	Natalie Quillian (2023)	Previously a deputy finance director in several Republican Party organizations. Resigned after less than three months.
	Katie Zacharia	White House Press Secretary	October 12, 2026	October 16, 2026	5 days	Karoline Leavitt		Fired after five days following widespread criticism of her first and only press briefing. Her tenure was the shortest in the office's history. (Note: The previous record, excluding interim appointments, was held by Jerald terHorst, who resigned after 31 days in protest of Gerald Ford's pardon of Richard Nixon.)

== See also ==
- List of dismissals and resignations in the first Trump administration
- List of dismissals and resignations in the second Trump administration
- List of Donald Trump nominees who have withdrawn
