= P90X (fitness program) =

Home fitness program by Tony Horton

- Type: Home fitness program
- Inventor: Tony Horton
- Inception: 2005
- Manufacturer: BODi
- Slogan: "Bring It"
- Website: shop.bodi.com

P90X (short for Power 90 Extreme) is a home fitness program developed by American fitness trainer Tony Horton for Beachbody (renamed BODi in 2023). Released in 2005 as the successor to the company's Power 90 program, it consists of a 90-day exercise regimen combining resistance training, cardiovascular exercise, plyometrics, yoga, and core training. The program was initially distributed through television infomercials and DVD sales before becoming available through Beachbody's streaming platform.

== Overview ==
According to Beachbody co-founder Carl Daikeler, P90X performed poorly during its first year on the market in 2005 because marketing costs exceeded revenue generated from sales.

Sales increased over the following years, aided in part by endorsements from public figures including Ashton Kutcher and Sheryl Crow. By 2010, CNBC reported that P90X accounted for approximately half of Beachbody's revenue. In 2010, CNBC described P90X as a US$200 million franchise.

In November 2025, BODi announced P90X Generation Next, a new program led by trainer Waz Ashayer and released on February 3, 2026 through the company's digital fitness platform.

In March 2026, BODi introduced a P90X-branded sports nutrition product line and expanded the franchise into nutritional supplements. The range included whey protein, hydration and energy products, a pre-workout formula, and creatine.
