= Katie Zacharia =

American political commentator

- Zacharia in 2026

37th White House Press Secretary
- In office October 12 – October 16, 2026
- President: Donald Trump
- Deputy: Anna Kelly
- Preceded by: Karoline Leavitt
- Succeeded by: TBD

Personal details
- Born: Kate Sharon Black; March 23, 1984 (age 42) Los Angeles, California, U.S.
- Party: Republican
- Spouse: Tyler Zacharia (m. 2011)
- Children: 4
- Education: Pepperdine University (BA, JD)
- Zacharia's voice Zacharia's first statement as press secretary Recorded October 13, 2026

Kate Sharon Zacharia (Note: /ˌzækəˈraɪə/ ZAK-ə-RY-ə) (née Black, born March 23, 1984) is an American political commentator who served as the 37th White House press secretary in October 2026 during the second presidency of Donald Trump. She held the title for five days, making her the shortest-serving White House press secretary in U.S. history.

While an undergraduate at Pepperdine University, Zacharia was a White House intern during the second term of President George W. Bush. She served as the deputy assistant secretary for public affairs for the Department of Homeland Security briefly in early 2026.

As press secretary, Zacharia was criticized in the media for characterizing herself as a lawyer while lacking legal credentials to act as an attorney. Her sole press briefing in the James S. Brady Press Briefing Room, on October 13, lasted about 15 minutes and was criticized by members of both parties. On October 16, the Trump administration said Zacharia would be "transitioning into a new role that will be announced at a later date".

== Early life and education ==
Kate Sharon Black was born on March 23, 1984 in Los Angeles, California. She has said that she was placed for adoption at birth and was 18 when she first spoke with her birth mother.

At age seven or eight, Black moved from Huntington Beach, California, to Cambria, California, where she graduated from Coast Union High School in 2003. While in college, she interned at the Republican National Committee in 2006 and for the White House Office of Political Affairs in the second term of the George W. Bush administration. She graduated from Pepperdine University's liberal arts college in 2007 and was president of its chapter of College Republicans.

From 2007 to 2008, she was an assistant to Pepperdine's president, Andrew K. Benton. Black earned a Juris Doctor in 2011 from the Pepperdine University School of Law, where she was a research assistant to Jim Gash, who would become president of the university in 2019. She took the California bar exam in 2011 but did not pass.

== Career ==
After graduating from Pepperdine University law school in 2011, Zacharia moved to Beijing, China, where she worked on the international practice team at the Zhong Lun Law Firm.

From 2013 to late 2023, Zacharia was an "affiliate marketer" for Beachbody (now known as BODi), a fitness company that ran a multilevel marketing operation she described as "sort of a pyramid scheme", recruited by a friend to sell their Shakeology brand dietary supplements. BODi referred to Zacharia as one of their "independent Team Beachbody distributors". In September 2024, BODi moved away from the multi-level marketing model.

From 2023 to 2025, Zacharia served as director of development for special projects at Pepperdine University, and in September 2024 she began working as a commentator for right-wing media outlet Newsmax. As of October 2026, Zacharia is a member of the Pepperdine University School of Law Dean's Council.

Zacharia was appointed as the deputy assistant secretary for public affairs for the Department of Homeland Security in February 2026. She announced her resignation the following month. According to CNN, Zacharia, who lived with her family in California, told an associate that commuting to the Department of Homeland Security's headquarters in Washington, D.C., was not sustainable. She had been a communications advisor to the Trump Media and Technology Group since June 2026 when she was selected to be White House press secretary.

== White House press secretary (2026) ==
Zacharia's sole press briefing on October 13, 2026

Politico reported that Zacharia sought the attention of President Donald Trump by monitoring his schedule and social media posts, allowing her to time her television appearances to occur during periods she expected Trump might be watching. Based on her television appearances, Trump decided to appoint her to his administration. On October 9, 2026, Trump announced on social media that Zacharia would be White House press secretary, and her term officially began on October 12. Her sole press briefing in the James S. Brady Press Briefing Room was on October 13; it lasted about 15 minutes and she took three questions from conservative outlets; Breitbart, Fox News, and the Daily Mail. During the press briefing, Zacharia broke the news of Kimberly Guilfoyle's resignation as U.S. ambassador to Greece.

Zacharia's performance in her only press conference was widely criticized by members of both parties. For the first eight minutes, she appeared nervous and read off a script. She answered questions from a preselected group of conservative news outlets and mistakenly referred to her husband as the president. The New York Times journalist Shawn McCreesh compared Zacharia to Scott McClellan and Karine Jean-Pierre, press secretaries for George W. Bush and Joe Biden respectively; McCreesh said that all three's performances reflected that of individuals who were not inside the president's inner circle, unlike Zacharia's predecessor, Karoline Leavitt. Zacharia's press conference received negative feedback from CNN's Kaitlan Collins, Jimmy Kimmel, and The Atlantic. Zacharia was reportedly stunned and unprepared for the backlash she received, telling Trump and others that the week since her appointment had been much rougher than she ever expected.

=== Legal qualification controversy ===
Zacharia answering questions from the press with President Trump following the briefing, where she notably says she passed the bar exam when she "moved to China."

On October 13, 2026, following Zacharia's first press conference as White House Press Secretary, a reporter asked where Zacharia passed the bar exam. Zacharia replied: "When I moved to China." She subsequently said that, because of the noise coming from the presidential helicopter Marine One, she misheard the question as "Where were you after law school?" Zacharia had taken the California bar exam in 2011 but did not pass. The bar exam in mainland China is only given to Chinese citizens.

Journalist Judd Legum said he could not find any evidence that Zacharia had passed the bar exam anywhere in the United States, a finding confirmed by The Washington Post. The Wall Street Journal subsequently confirmed Zacharia has never passed the bar exam, and is not a practicing attorney. Despite this, Zacharia had repeatedly referred to herself as a lawyer during her appearances on Fox News and on her social media accounts. She also told NPR on October 14 that "she practiced international transaction law with all the appropriate credentials." Zacharia said the president of Pepperdine University told her it was acceptable for her to call herself a lawyer but not an attorney. On October 15, 2026, in an interview with Jack Posobiec, Zacharia admitted that she had never passed any bar examination. Zacharia stated that she had called herself a lawyer, but never an "attorney at law" and maintained that she had not misrepresented her legal career. Zacharia had shared at least 15 posts on social media that called her an "attorney". The Washington Post reported that she confirmed she had not passed any bar exam, and quoted her as saying, "It's unfortunate that people dub this as some kind of conspiracy or want to put me in a camp. The truth is, is I was very careful how I executed this and I never came across as someone who was an attorney-in-law [sic]."

On October 14, 2026, the Campaign for Accountability filed a complaint with the State Bar of California, asking that it investigate whether Zacharia had violated state law in presenting herself as a lawyer. In November 2026, the State Bar of California officially launched an investigation into Zacharia.

=== Firing ===
On October 16, 2026, Zacharia was fired after five days on the job. Her brief tenure was compared to that of Anthony Scaramucci, who served as White House Communications Director for 11 days in 2017. Zacharia holds the record for shortest tenure as White House press secretary, as she only served for five days. Scaramucci tweeted that "Records are made to be broken". Following her new record as shortest serving White House press secretary, the "Zacharia" was suggested as a unit of measurement representing five days, similar to a "Scaramucci" representing 11 days. In an analysis in The Guardian, David Smith wrote that Zacharia's hiring exposed flaws in Trump making hiring decisions based on television appearances.

In her first interview after leaving the White House, Zacharia attributed her departure to the media and her status as a Washington outsider, saying they made it difficult to do her job. In an op-ed for the New York Post, she accused the press corps of having "Trump Derangement Syndrome" and reiterated her loyalty to Trump.

== Political positions ==
Zacharia with president Donald Trump in the Oval Office in 2026

Zacharia has shared several posts on social media promoting the unfounded conspiracy theory that Democratic Party and entertainment industry figures are part of a pedophilia ring. In 2022, Zacharia accused Democratic political consultant John Podesta of being a pedophile, a claim similar to that of the debunked Pizzagate conspiracy theory. In response to an article about Bones and All, a film about two fictional cannibals, Zacharia wrote, "The radical left Hollywood elitists are sick pedo cannibals. Change my mind." Zacharia also shared a post suggesting a link between the death of Joan Rivers and a joke Rivers had made regarding the sexuality of former U.S. President Barack Obama and former first lady Michelle Obama. In a 2022 social media post, Zacharia expressed support for QAnon, a conspiracy theory claiming Donald Trump is secretly fighting a group of pedophiles consisting of celebrities and Democratic Party politicians.

Following the 2022 Russian invasion of Ukraine, Zacharia shared another user's post supporting Russian president Vladimir Putin. The post declared, "Putin is at war with the CABAL - and the Ukraine is in bed with them."

In 2025, Zacharia said that the United States should "suspend habeas corpus" in response to a post written by Stephen Miller regarding illegal immigration. Zacharia is critical of California governor Gavin Newsom, replying to a post written by Newsom that "The federal government under @realDonaldTrump should take over all of California because clearly you can't be trusted to do a single thing." Zacharia has spread COVID-19 vaccine misinformation, sharing an inaccurate statistic that "8 in 10 women had a miscarriage after getting the COVID vaccine."

Zacharia is critical of the transgender rights movement. Without evidence, Zacharia accused "leftist transgender assailants" of perpetrating "at least a dozen" school shootings. Zacharia characterized California Senate Bill 107, which establishes California as a sanctuary state for transgender youth, as part of a "war against our children." Zacharia criticized Barack Obama for his support of trans-inclusive policies, saying that "his administration was quite hostile toward biological women."

Zacharia is anti-abortion and is on the board of the White Rose Resistance, an anti-abortion group. She has falsely claimed that the abortion pill mifepristone "has the same chemicals that they used in the exterminate [sic] camps in Nazi Germany."

== Personal life ==
Katie married film producer Tyler Zacharia in 2011. They have four children, three sons and a daughter, born between 2014 and 2020 during which she was a stay-at-home mother.

== See also ==
- List of short-tenure Donald Trump political appointments
- List of dismissals and resignations in the second Trump administration

Political offices
Preceded by Karoline Leavitt	White House Press Secretary; 2026	Vacant
