= Tricia McLaughlin (spokeswoman) =

American spokeswoman (born 1994 or 1995)

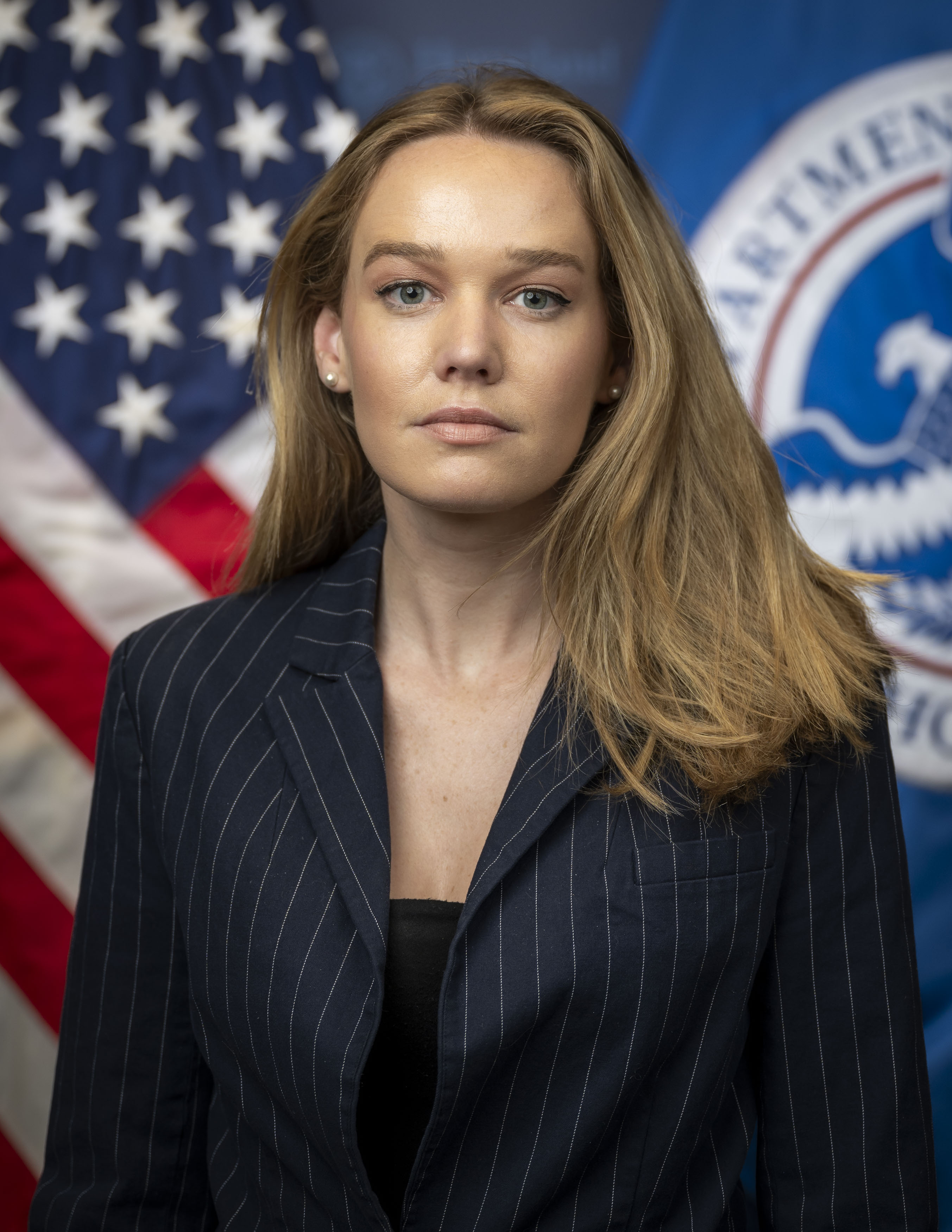
- Official portrait, 2025

Assistant Secretary of Homeland Security for Public Affairs
- In office January 20, 2025 – February 27, 2026
- President: Donald Trump
- Preceded by: Daniel Watson
- Succeeded by: Katie Zacharia

Personal details
- Born: 1994 or 1995 (age 31–32)
- Party: Republican
- Spouse: Benjamin Yoho
- Education: University of Maryland, College Park (BA)

Tricia McLaughlin (born 1994 or 1995) is an American Republican Party spokeswoman who served as assistant secretary for public affairs in the United States Department of Homeland Security (DHS) during the first year of the second Donald Trump administration. She became the face and voice of the administration's immigration enforcement policies. McLaughlin also served in the first Trump administration.

McLaughlin became prominent as a vocal defender of the second Trump administration's immigration enforcement policies. In her statements, she defended the killings of US citizens by immigration enforcement officers, made assertions that were contradicted by evidence or statements by local officials, and accused federal judges who issued rulings unfavorable to the administration of incompetence and malfeasance.

== Early life and education ==
McLaughlin grew up in the Cincinnati suburb of Montgomery, Ohio, and graduated from Sycamore High School, which is, according to the Columbia Journalism Review, "one of Ohio’s strongest public schools". McLaughlin has described her grandfather Powell McHenry, the director of the Republican Club of Hamilton County, as an influence on her.

McLaughlin studied political science and government at the University of Maryland, where she was a member of Kappa Alpha Theta. In 2021, she returned to Ohio.

== Career ==
=== Early career ===
After graduating from college, McLaughlin worked as the spokesperson for the Ohio Republican Party. During the first Trump administration, McLaughlin served as chief of staff of the Bureau of International Security and Nonproliferation. McLaughlin led communications for the 2022 reelection campaign of Ohio governor Mike DeWine and the Vivek Ramaswamy 2024 presidential campaign.

=== Second Trump administration ===
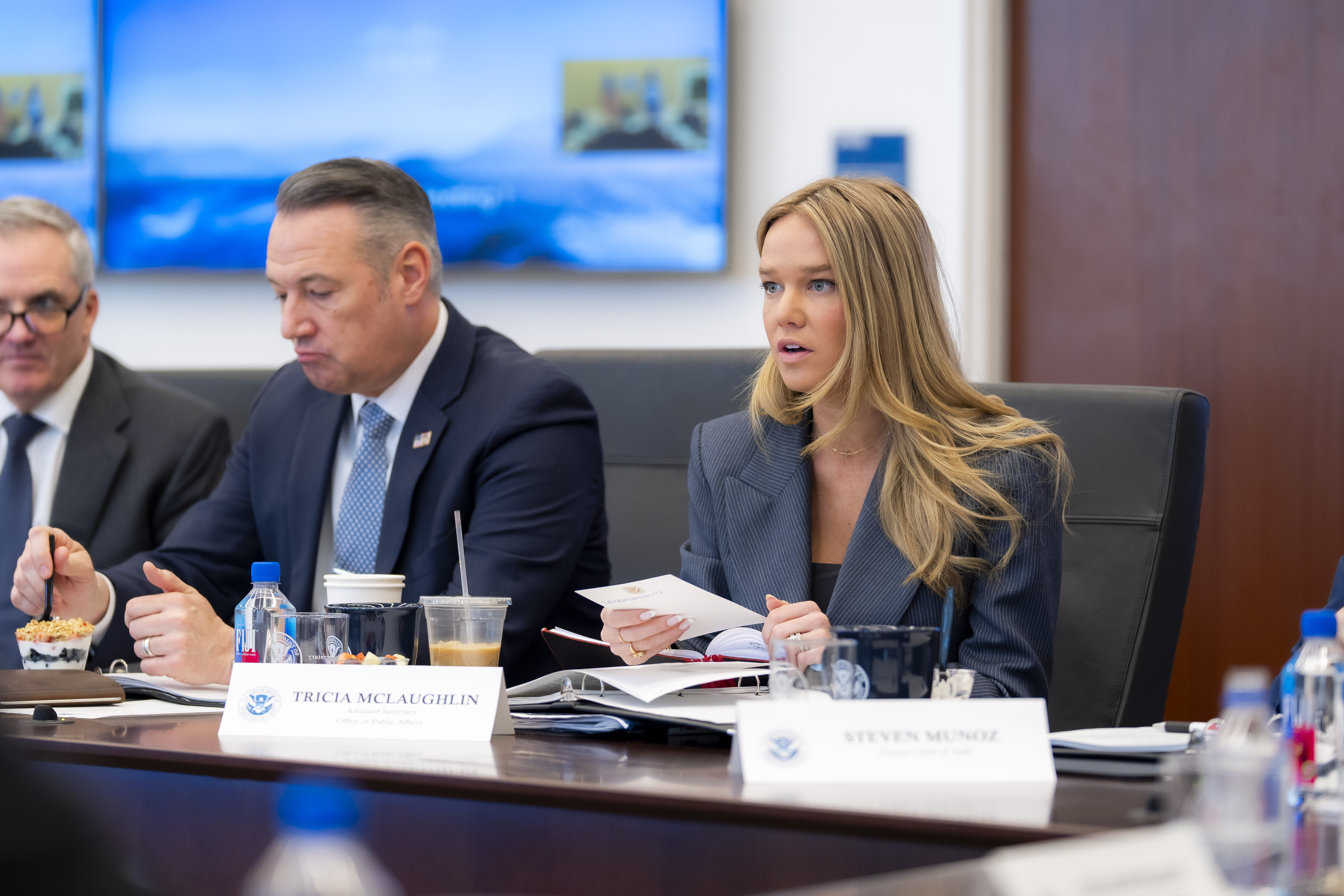
McLaughlin during a DHS meeting at the United States Department of Homeland Security Headquarters on January 21, 2026

In the second Trump administration, McLaughlin served as spokeswoman for the Department of Homeland Security (DHS) during the first year of the administration and became one of its most vocal defenders.

In an interview with The New York Times in January 2026, she described herself as "in charge of everything" that the Department of Homeland Security put on social media. She became the face and voice of the administration's aggressive immigration enforcement. MS Now called her "possibly the most quoted person in the administration besides Trump". The Washington Post said she had "built a reputation as a fierce defender of the administration's handling of immigration and of the secretary's leadership". She often issued statements in support of actions of federal officers before incidents had been investigated; in some prominent cases her statements were later contradicted by video footage or court testimony.

In a December 2025 interview with the Cincinnati Enquirer, McLaughlin said of her communications approach: "Is it often aggressive? Yes, but I think it's also incredibly effective." The New York Times reported in February of 2026 that the DHS said McLaughlin "had received an increasing number of threats, including those made to her family". On January 13, 2026, Ricardo Antonio and Emilio Roman-Flores, twin brothers from Absecon, New Jersey, were arrested for threatening to hang McLaughlin.

Following the killing of Renée Good, McLaughlin wrote on social media: "Dangerous criminals — whether they be illegal aliens or U.S. citizens — are turning their vehicles into weapons to attack ICE". Following the killing of Alex Pretti, McLaughlin told news outlets that Pretti "violently resisted" immigration officers and appeared to be "an individual [who] wanted to do maximum damage and massacre law enforcement". On January 27, 2026, Fox News host Dana Perino pressed McLaughlin on her labelling of Pretti as a "domestic terrorist". McLaughlin did not directly answer Perino's question.

Following January 2026 posts from official DHS accounts that included the slogan "WE'LL HAVE OUR HOME AGAIN.", the name of a song written by members of a self-described "pro-White fraternal order," The New York Times characterized McLaughlin as "mainstreaming racism" by tying the agency's posts to the anthem.

McLaughlin characterized federal judges who had issued rulings limiting the powers of Immigrations and Customs Enforcement officers as "unhinged," "deranged", "out of control", "craven" and "disgusting and immoral" and accused them of engaging in "judicial sabotage". Her public statements about the administration's motivations "undermine[d] the administration's legal arguments" according to Mark Joseph Stern, writing for Slate; attorneys suing the administration used her statements to refute federal attorneys' arguments in court in multiple prominent cases.

On February 17, 2026, Politico reported that DHS officials, speaking anonymously, said McLaughlin would be leaving DHS the following week. The report indicated McLaughlin had started planning her exit from DHS in December 2025 but had delayed her departure after the Good and Pretti killings in Minneapolis. McLaughlin told the Cincinnati Enquirer her last day would be February 27. McLaughlin's deputy Lauren Bis was named as her replacement and Katie Zacharia as Bis's replacement as deputy assistant secretary. Zacharia, however, resigned from her position as deputy assistant secretary at the end of March 2026, weeks after her appointment was announced.

== Contract controversy ==
During the second Trump administration, while McLaughlin was working for DHS, a ProPublica investigation published in November 2025 showed that Strategy Group, the advertising firm McLaughlin's then-fiancé headed as CEO, was subcontracted by Safe America as part of a $220 million dollar advertising campaign for the Department of Homeland Security. The Strategy Group says they received $226,137 for 5 film shoots and the production of 45 video ads and 6 radio ads Federal Communications Commission documents named McLaughlin as the decision maker for $220 million in government contracts for the campaign. McLaughlin said she had recused herself from the contracts.

== Personal life ==
McLaughlin met Benjamin Yoho, a political consultant, while they were working on Vivek Ramaswamy's 2024 presidential campaign. The couple married on August 23, 2025.
