= Government hiring and personnel of Donald Trump =

Donald Trump has had his hiring decisions criticized due to relatively high level of scandals and legal trouble. Turnover in the Trump administration was the highest of all presidents since Brookings Institution started measuring in 1980, and cause for concern according to some experts. According to some historians, Trump has received criticism from former officials at levels not seen over the last hundred years. Nepotism has also risen as a point of comparison across administrations, with Trump having more family members in prominent roles than recent presidents.

== Turnover ==
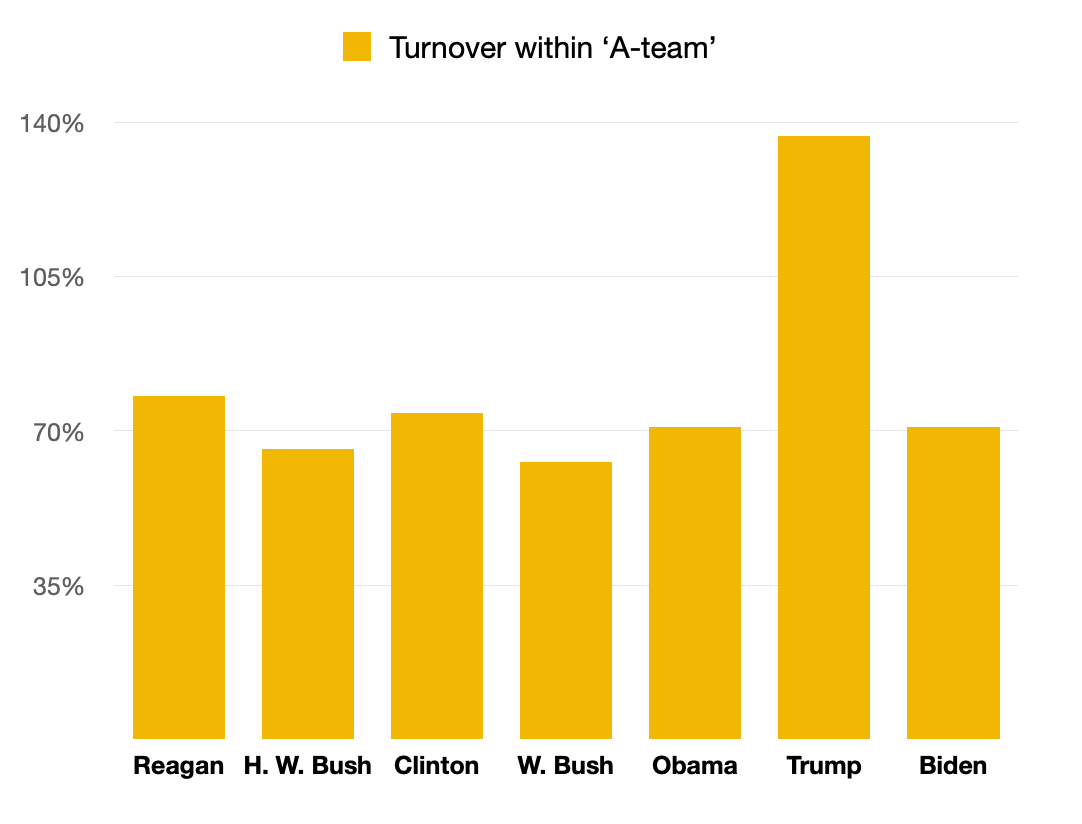
Turnover by presidency according to the Brookings Institution

Donald Trump had more turnover in his administration than any president since the Brookings Institution started measuring in 1980, with 92% of his A-team followed by another 45% of his second hires for his A-team. The turnover rate in his first year was double the next highest president since Reagan. Kathryn Dunn Tenpas suggested that the high turnover stemmed from Trump's insistence on loyalty over competence. Infighting was also reportedly intense.

A 2018 Harvard Business Review article argued that White House turnover was especially concerning in the Trump administration due to the lack of experience and expertise among the staffers Trump hired. The article also argued that high turnover slows down productive work during the transition and as the new hire progresses up the learning curve, and that teams with high turnover at the top tend to perform worse. Replacement times can be higher in the White House due to security clearances, which makes high turnover environments more disruptive. Gautam Mukunda argues that the manner in which many high-profile personnel were fired, such as over Twitter, shrinks the pool of qualified candidates who would want to work in a Trump administration. There also have not seemed to have been lucrative jobs waiting for former White House officials as was true of previous administrations. He also speculated that the threat of legal bills for working in a Trump administration would be a significant deterrent.

In June 2020, Mick Mulvaney said that if he had one criticism of Trump, it was that he did not hire very well.

=== Acting secretaries ===
Trump opted for filling some positions temporarily with acting appointees who did not have to get Senate confirmation. Stanford Law Professor Anne Joseph O'Connell found that they had a harder time accomplishing their work and had less influence. An April 2019 Time article described Trump as having a historically high level of acting cabinet members, which Jon Michaels of the UCLA School of Law called "very troubling."

== Presidential transition ==
=== 2016 ===
Trump's 2016 presidential transition set a 'low bar' for modern transitions according to Max Stier, followed by George H. W. Bush.

=== 2024 ===
Trump's 2024 transition team officially started in August, which is considered unusually late as most transition efforts start in the late spring. Donald Trump Jr. and Eric Trump were reported by Axios to be screening members of the transition team and future administration for loyalty. Robert F. Kennedy Jr.'s inclusion as an honorary co-chair has generated concern among health experts worried about the influence he may have in hiring people related to vaccines and other important health-related positions. Kennedy said his role in the administration would relate to healthcare and food and drug policy, and later stating that Trump would give him control over HHS and the USDA. Another conspiracy theorist named an honorary co-chair is Tulsi Gabbard. Gabbard has defended autocratic regimes against criticism including Russia and Syria.

== Felony convictions, indictments, charges and other ethics scandals ==
=== First term ===
In July 2024, Axios described the number of Trump associates sentenced to prison as "striking". PolitiFact noted in 2020 that there have historically been many more indictments under Republican presidents than Democratic ones with 28 indictments under Nixon and 33 under Reagan.

Robert Schlesinger criticized Trump's hiring decisions for the relatively high incidence of scandals and legal trouble, arguing that Trump's focus on loyalty over competence drives many of the issues. Chris Christie called hiring "a blind spot" for Trump.

By March 2018, 7 out of 24 members of Trump's cabinet faced accusations of abusing their perks in office.

In March 2018, ProPublica revealed that at least 187 of Trump's first 2,475 political appointees have been lobbyists, with many overseeing industries they once lobbied for.

=== Second term ===
Some particulartly controversial nominations made by Donald Trump for positions in the government during his second term as president include Matt Gaetz for Attorney General, Pete Hegseth for Secretary of Defense and Tulsi Gabbard for Director of National Intelligence. Politico characterized Trump's nominees as of November 13, 2024 as being primarily motivated by loyalty. The Guardian described the picks as more extreme than those proposed in 2016. Reuters and the AP noted how in addition to loyalty, television experience seemed to be a trait that was prioritized. Many personnel are being vetted for their views of January 6 Capitol attack and the outcome of the 2020 election.

== Family members in major roles ==
Nepotism is more often associated with dictatorships who centralize power in unqualified family members. In 1967, a Federal anti-nepotism statute was passed after John F. Kennedy appointed his brother Robert F. Kennedy as Attorney General.

Nepotism has also risen as a point of comparison across administrations, with Trump having more family members in prominent roles than recent presidents. The Guardian cites foreign policy experts who think that 'dynastic displays' by promoting one's kids who do not have experience damage America's credibility. Vox criticizes his "several adult children and in-laws who have business careers that are enmeshed with his political fortunes." Matthew Yglesias also described Ivanka as "involved in policymaking in a way that’s simply unheard of for a presidential child, especially one with zero prior experience in politics and government". Yglesias also described Jared Kushner, another senior adviser for Trump, as having "a vast policy portfolio, no obvious qualifications for government, and a large fortune inherited from his criminal father has left Kushner with myriad financial conflicts of interest."

While Donald Trump Jr. and Eric Trump have been campaigning for their dad since 2016 and in 2024 have become, along Eric's wife and RNC co-chair Lara Trump, the most visible family members of the campaign and would be expected to have a significant role in a future administration. Donald Trump Jr. hopes to be a gatekeeper who can veto any hire and who, along with Eric, was reportedly influential in JD Vance being selected as the Vice Presidential nominee. Jared Kushner's private equity firm Affinity Partners raised a fund from foreign investors, that has made $157 million in management fees (including $87 million from the Saudi government alone) between 2021-2024. The fund is under Senate investigation for possible foreign influence buying ahead of the 2024 election after a New York Times report suggested that Kushner used contacts he made from his role in Trump's White House.

== Criticism by former personnel ==
USA Today interviewed three presidential historians and a political scientist about the volume of criticism directed towards Trump by former officials who served under him, and reported that it had no historical precedent in the last century. The Washington Post said that no president had ever drawn more detractors from inside his inner-circle. CNN said that "No person in US politics – certainly no recent president – has such an expansive list of high-profile allies turned enemies." PBS described the level of detractors who witnessed the president work first-hand as, "without precedent in the modern era." Half of Trump's cabinet do not endorse Trump's 2024 campaign, and Trump became the first president to be called a fascist by his former hand-picked top adviser.

== See also ==
- Age and health concerns of Donald Trump
- Democratic backsliding in the United States § Unitary executive theory
- Drain the swamp
- List of endorsements by Donald Trump
- List of federal political scandals in the United States#Donald Trump (R) administration (2017–2021)
- List of Trump administration dismissals and resignations
- First presidency of Donald Trump#Historical evaluations and public opinion
- First presidency of Donald Trump#Judicial appointments
- United States government group chat leaks
