= Coast Unified School District =

School district in California, United States

Address
- 1350 Main Street Cambria, California, 93428; United States

District information
- Type: Public
- Grades: K–12
- Schools: 4
- NCES District ID: 0600049

Students and staff
- Students: 489 (2022–2024)
- Teachers: 38.56 ((on an FTE basis))
- Staff: 68.20 ((on an FTE basis))
- Student–teacher ratio: 12.68:1

Other information
- Website: www.coastusd.org

Coast Unified School District is located on the Central Coast of the US state of California in the community of Cambria. The district consists of one K-5 elementary school, one 6–8 middle school, one traditional 9–12 high school and one alternative high school. There are approximately 500 students enrolled K-12.

It includes Cambria and San Simeon (to the north of Cambria) for grades PK-12, and almost all of Cayucos (to the south) for grades 9-12 only. It also includes surrounding rural areas.

== Alumni ==
- Katie Zacharia, White House press secretary
