= Justin Poole =

US government official

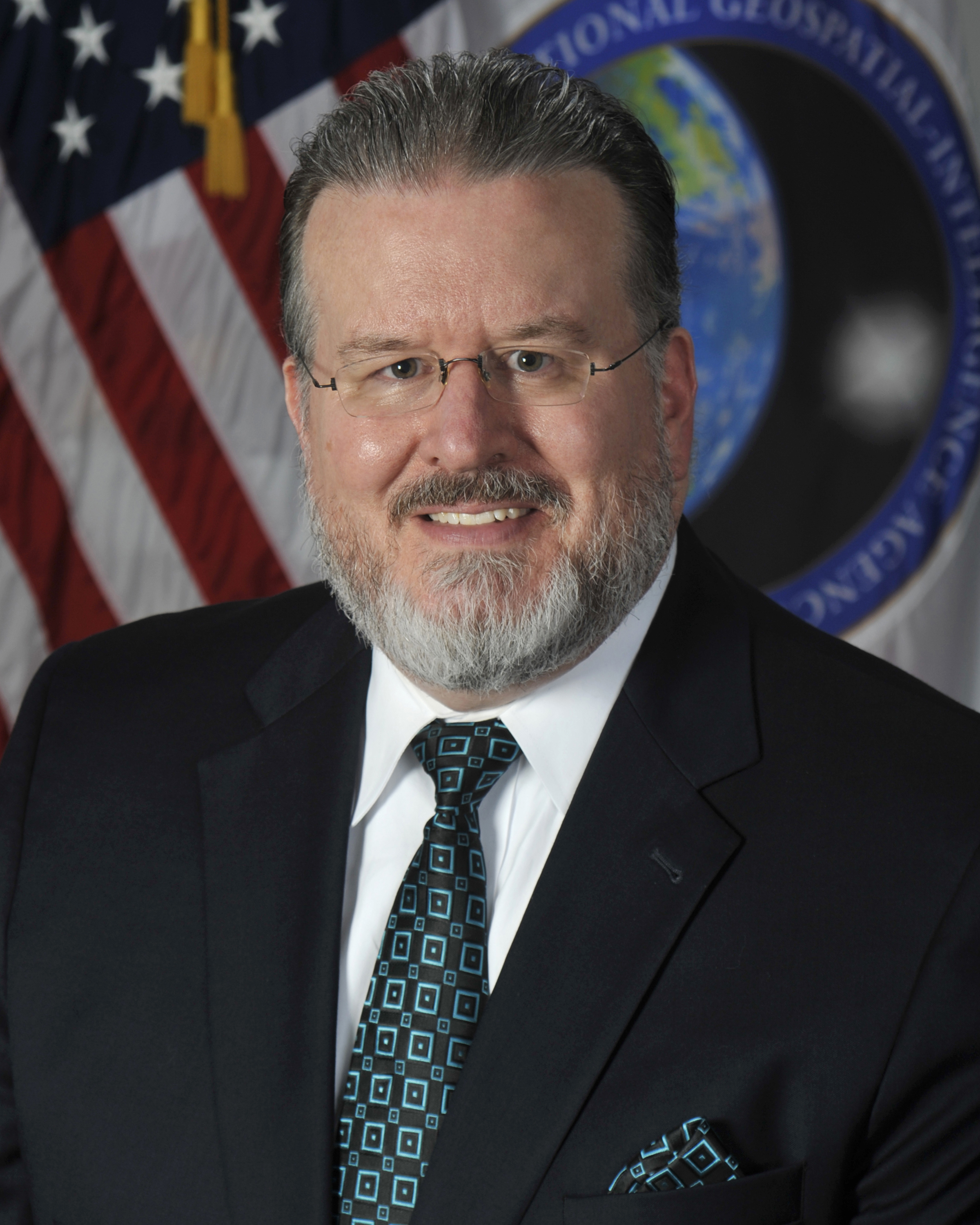

Deputy Director of the National Geospatial-Intelligence Agency
- In office August 10, 2017 – June 11, 2019
- President: Donald Trump
- Preceded by: Susan M. Gordon
- Succeeded by: Stacey Dixon

Personal details
- Education: University of Maryland; Harvard Kennedy School

Justin Poole was the seventh deputy director of the National Geospatial-Intelligence Agency (NGA). As deputy director of NGA, he assisted the director in leading the agency and managing the day-to-day operations of NGA and the National System for Geospatial-Intelligence. He became the deputy director on August 10, 2017, after more than 28 years of service with NGA and its predecessor organizations. He resigned on June 11, 2019, following a Department of Defense probe into allegations of personal misconduct.

Poole previously served concurrently as NGA's Content Portfolio Manager and the Director of Source, responsible for creating, collecting, and brokering authoritative GEOINT content and services to support national security priorities.

Poole began his career as a cartographer and geospatial analyst with the Defense Mapping Agency, one of NGA's predecessor organizations, in 1991. He held several tradecraft and system architecture developmental positions before moving into analytic and technical management positions.

Poole joined the Senior Executive Service in 2002 and has successively served as the deputy director for mission management, National Counterterrorism Center, his first Joint Duty Assignment (JDA); deputy program manager for the NSG, NGA; associate deputy director of IMINT, National Reconnaissance Office, his second JDA; and director, Xperience Directorate, NGA.

Poole holds a Bachelor of Science degree in geography (cartography) from the University of Maryland and is a graduate of the Senior Managers Program at the Harvard Kennedy School. He is a recipient of numerous awards and citations including the Meritorious Presidential Rank award, Superior Civilian Service Medal and NGA's Challenger Award. He currently is president of his own consulting firm, J. C. Poole Consulting LLC, in Lorton, Virginia.

== Misconduct ==
On February 27, 2019, Poole was placed on administrative leave following a DoD investigation containing substantiated allegations of personal misconduct.

A DoD IG report states that "On September 21, 2018, the DoD Office of Inspector General received a complaint referred from the National Geospatial‐Intelligence Agency OIG against Mr. Justin C. Poole, NGA Deputy Director. On November 6, 2018, we initiated an investigation into the allegation that Mr. Poole engaged in an inappropriate and unprofessional relationship with a subordinate. We concluded that Mr. Poole engaged in an inappropriate and unprofessional relationship with a subordinate from July 2018 through November 2018.".
