= Edward Masso =

American Navy admiral & businessman (born 1955)

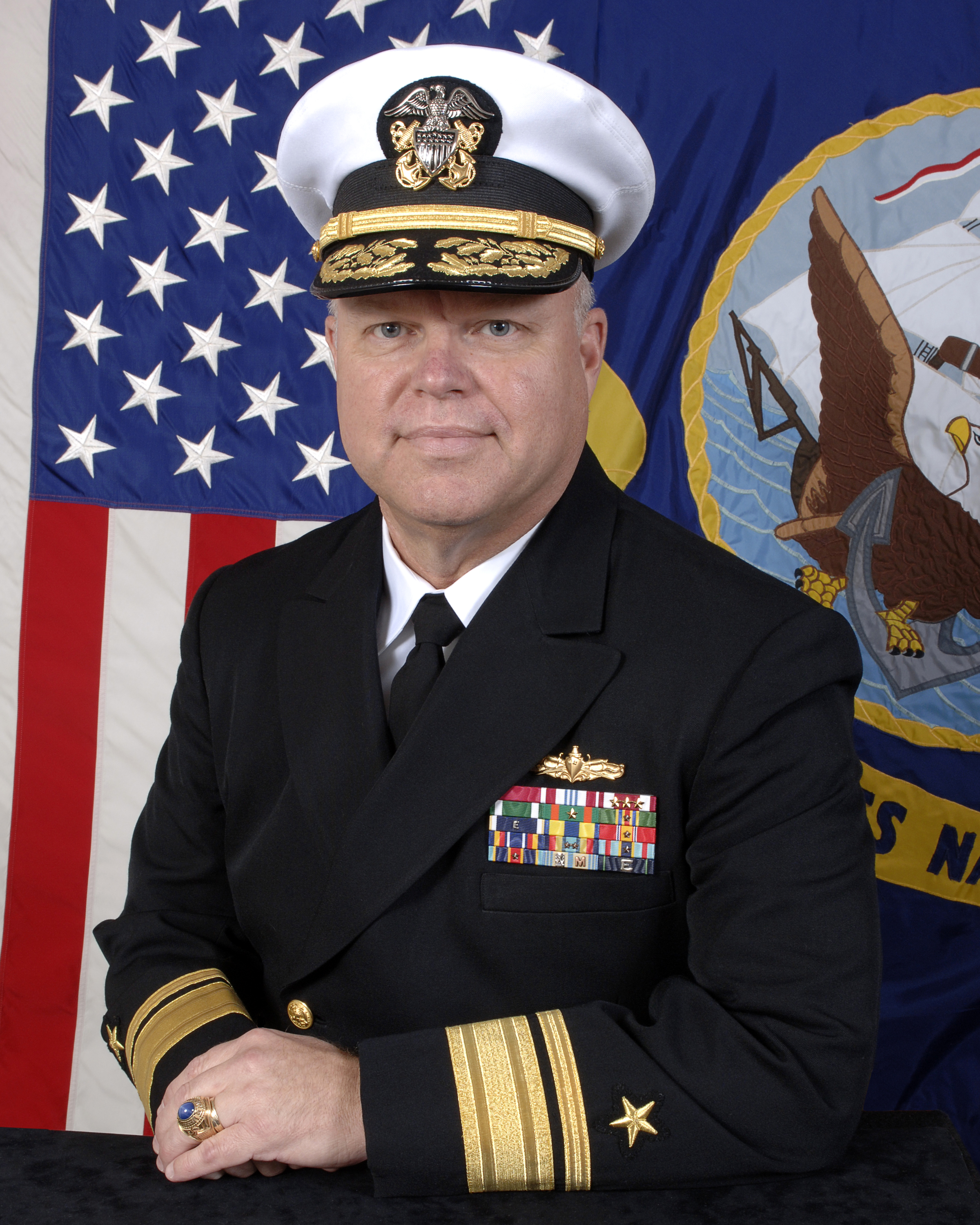
- Masso in 2006

Personal details
- Born: 1955 (age 70–71) San Clemente, California
- Party: Republican
- Education: University of Mississippi

Edward Masso (born 1955) is a businessman and retired United States Navy Rear Admiral who was nominated by President Donald Trump to become the next United States Ambassador to Estonia. He is the founder and president of Flagship Connection, a consulting company focused on business development, strategic planning, and operations analysis in the areas of missile defense, cyber security, and data analytics. During his 32-year career in the U.S. Navy, he held nine command assignments, including Commander, Navy Personnel Command/Deputy Chief of Naval Personnel. He has served in NATO and the United States European Command. Masso is a senior fellow at the Potomac Institute for Policy Studies in cyber security.

Masso is a recipient of the Distinguished Service Medal, Legion of Merit (Gold Star), Defense Meritorious Service Medal, Meritorious Service Medal (three Gold Stars), Navy and Marine Corps Commendation Medal, and Navy Achievement Medal (Gold Star). He is the son of an Estonian refugee and graduated from San Clemente High School in 1973 and the University of Mississippi in 1977.

Trump withdrew Masso's nomination in May 2018.
