= J. Steven Gardner =

American coal industry executive

Personal details
- Party: Republican
- Education: University of Kentucky

James Steve Gardner is a coal industry consultant and a former nominee for Administrator Office of Surface Mining Reclamation and Enforcement (OSMRE)

== Career in coal industry ==
Gardener started in coal as a project engineer with Bethlehem Coal. In 1979 he was employed by Big K Operating Company (division of U.S. Coal Company division of National Coal currently inactive). He moved to Kenwill Inc. in Maryville, TN.

=== Engineering Consulting Services, Inc., (now ECSI, LLC) ===
ECSI is an engineering services firm in Lexington, Kentucky.

In 2010, the Department of the Interior complained about the quality of reports delivered by ECSI to the agency. In January 2011. a leaked version of an ECSI report suggested that 7,000 jobs would be lost as a result of the Stream Protection Rule. In 2011, the government discontinued using ECSI. Later, ECSI and the Stream Protection Rule were topics of argument in the Congress. Gardner stands by his assessment that regulation has been a "war on coal".

== Office of Surface Mining ==
On October 26, 2017, Gardner was nominated by President Donald Trump to become the next Administrator of the Office of Surface Mining Reclamation and Enforcement (OSMRE). His nomination was referred to the Senate Committee on Energy and Natural Resources on October 30. His nomination was returned to the President on January 3, 2018 according to Senate Rule XXXI, paragraph 6. The White House renominated him on January 8, 2018 but then withdrew his nomination on September 12, 2018 after it failed to receive a hearing before the Committee on Energy and Natural Resources.

== Early life and education ==
Gardner was born in Green County, Kentucky. At Kentucky University, he earned a B.S in agricultural engineering in 1975 and an M.S. in mining engineering in 1991.
