= Michael Dourson =

American toxicologist

Michael L. Dourson
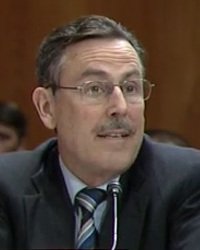
- Michael Dourson in 2017

Personal details
- Education: PhD (1980)
- Alma mater: Wittenberg University; University of Cincinnati College of Medicine
- Occupation: Toxicologist

Michael L. Dourson is an American toxicologist and Director of Science at the nonprofit organization, Toxicology Excellence for Risk Assessment. He was formerly a senior advisor to the Administrator of EPA, and prior to that, a professor at the Risk Science Center at the University of Cincinnati College of Medicine. Prior to joining the University of Cincinnati, he was founder and president of the nonprofit Toxicology Excellence for Risk Assessment. Earlier in his career, he was employed by the Environmental Protection Agency Environmental Criteria and Assessment Office, among other assignments.

In July 2017, Dourson was nominated by President Donald Trump to become Assistant Administrator of the Environmental Protection Agency, Office of Chemical Safety and Pollution Prevention. The United States Senate Committee on Environment and Public Works voted to advance his nomination on October 25, 2017. Dourson withdrew his nomination on December 13, 2017.

== Career ==
Dourson is board-certified by the American Board of Toxicology and a fellow of the Academy of Toxicological Sciences and the Society for Risk Analysis. He joined the Environmental Protection Agency after earning his doctorate in toxicology at the University of Cincinnati College of Medicine. During his time at the EPA, Dourson was one of the founders of the agency's Integrated Risk Information System (IRIS), a program that identifies and characterizes the health hazards of chemicals in the environment. Dourson was awarded a total of four bronze medals for his work on IRIS, ambient water criteria, sewage sludge rulemaking, and developing risk methodology during his 15-year tenure with the agency. He also served as a member of EPA's Science Advisory Board for six years.

Dourson worked in various roles in Cincinnati, Chicago, and Washington D.C. before founding the nonprofit Toxicology Excellence for Risk Assessment (TERA) in 1995. TERA determines the risk profile of chemicals, and maintained the International Toxicity Estimates for Risk (ITER) database until TERA was invited by the University of Cincinnati in 2015 to join as a separate center within the Department of Environmental Health. The National Institutes of Health (NIH) Toxicology Data Network (TOXNET) includes ITER in its list of reference databases for public use.

TERA has collaborated with well over 100 governmental organizations, industry groups, and nonprofits during its history, but it has been criticized as a "one-stop shop" for industry-friendly research. As of 2025, TERA's overall effort is ~2/3 work for government and NGOs and ~1/3 for industry. University of Maryland law professor Rena Stenizor has accused TERA of "whitewashing the work of industry." Notably, TERA has accepted payments for criticizing studies that raised concerns about the safety of products made by TERA's sponsors, but has also prepared numerous documents for government agencies. In 1997, TERA received ~$6000 to study the health effects of secondhand smoke from the Center for Indoor Air Research, a tobacco industry-funded group. For a fee, TERA will organize a peer-review panel for groups that want to have their studies displayed alongside governmental research in the ITER database, with past clients including Dow Chemical, Frito-Lay, the International Copper Association, Health Canada, Texas Commission on Environmental Quality, and the NSF International. As of 2025, about one-fourth of TERA's business came from assembling peer-review panels, and approximately 50 percent of the peer-reviewed panels TERA has organized since its founding in 1995 were funded by industry groups, with Dourson himself sitting on 69 percent of the panels TERA has organized.

Dourson has stated that he views conflict-of-interest rules that prevent EPA scientists from receiving funding to attend industry events as an impediment to good science, which is why TERA was founded as a 501c3 nonprofit organization (allowing government scientists to accept travel funds).

In 2007, Dourson helped found the Alliance for Risk Assessment (ARA), an affiliate of TERA. A close colleague of Dourson, Michael Honeycutt, sat on the steering committee of ARA as well as heading the toxicology division at the Texas Commission on Environmental Quality (TCEQ), when TCEQ awarded TERA a $600,000 grant in 2005 to review TCEQ's chemical evaluations.

In July 2024, Dourson emailed scientists, consultants, and lawyers with a proposal to develop and publish peer-reviewed science for chemical companies, governments, consultants, universities and NGOs who all attended an international workshop held in Washington DC This was criticized as "not a valid approach to science" by Maria Doa of the Environmental Defense Fund. However, the publication of workshops is a routine part of science; papers from this workshop are now becoming available.

=== Publications ===
As of 2014, 19 of the 33 studies Dourson had co-authored had been published in the academic journal Regulatory Toxicology and Pharmacology, of which Dourson is a member of the editorial board and which receives funding from industry groups including Dow AgroSciences, Procter & Gamble, and the American Chemistry Council. As of 2025, Dourson has authored over 150 publications, with 44 in this academic journal, 22 as a government scientist. The journal now receives funding from open access fees or paid subscriptions.

Dourson is also a writer of a series of books entitled Evidence of Faith, which examines the intersection of historical analysis and science, such as astronomy and evolution and Bible history.

=== Toxicology debates ===
Dourson's organization TERA has studied many substances whose use has been the matter of public debate, including chlorpyrifos (a pesticide), diacetyl (a food additive), ammonium perchlorate (a rocket fuel), 1-bromopropane (an industrial solvent), and perfluorooctanoic acid (PFOA) (a plastics production chemical). The determinations of safe occupational exposure limits, safe water standards, threshold limit value, recommended exposure limit and safe dose may vary by a factor of ten, even among equally qualified investigators.

In his 2017 confirmation hearings, Dourson was grilled about safe levels of PFOA in drinking water. The attack came amid the filing of 3,500 lawsuits over PFOA exposure. In 2002, Dourson and two other TERA scientists had participated in a court-ordered ten-person panel to review existing research on PFOA. Five members of the panel were government representatives (3 from EPA, 1 from ATSDR and 1 from West Virginia) and two from DuPont. The panel found no history of illness or premature death in 3M or DuPont manufacturing workers since 1947. It did find a heightened liver disease risk in animal models among other lesser risks. The panel recommended a reduction in the allowable amount in drinking water to 150 ppb, a reduction from a DuPont-sponsored recommendation of 210 ppb. The concentration of PFOA in the Lubeck, West Virginia public water supply was at that time 1 ppb.

In 2018, Dourson filed comments urging a "less stringent level" for PFOA and PFOS in response to a federal study, and since that time has published two book chapters on PFAS chemistries, and in collaborations with other scientists written seven papers, his efforts of which have been unfunded.

== Failed nomination to EPA ==
In July 2017, President Donald Trump nominated Dourson to become Assistant Administrator of the Environmental Protection Agency, Chemical Safety and Pollution Prevention. His nomination was sent to the United States Senate on July 19, 2017. His hearing before the United States Senate Committee on Environment and Public Works took place on October 4, 2017. Dourson's nomination was endorsed by the American Chemistry Council. and many of his scientific and religious colleagues

During the hearing, he was criticized by Democrats for his ties to the chemical industry. Dourson defended himself, saying he would commit to the law and the EPA's mission to protect the public and the environment from chemicals. An October 2017 New York Times editorial called Dourson a "scientist for hire" and said his nomination for an EPA post was "dangerous to public health." During his Senate confirmation process, he responded privately in writing to accusations and these responses were sent to several US Senators. These responses have been made public.

Dourson withdrew his nomination amid bipartisan opposition on December 13, 2017, thus allowing three of his nominated colleagues to be voice-voted through the Senate. However, his nomination for Assistant Administrator of the Environmental Protection Agency was not formally withdrawn by Trump but was instead returned unconfirmed by the US Senate on January 3, 2018, under Standing Rules of the United States Senate, Rule XXXI, paragraph 6.

== Awards ==
Dourson was awarded the Arnold J. Lehman award from the Society of Toxicology and the International Achievement Award by the International Society of Regulatory Toxicology and Pharmacology. He is a fellow of the Academy of Toxicological Sciences and the Society for Risk Analysis. He also has 27 other awards from various governments and NGOs.
