= Shakeology =

Nutrition shake

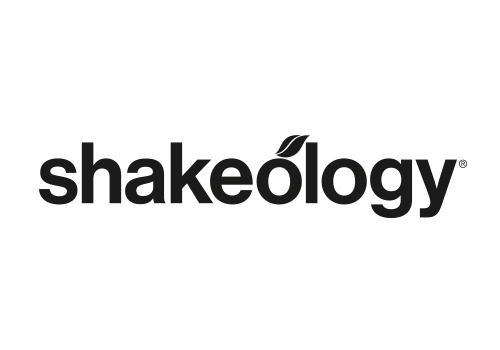
- Type: Dietary supplement
- Inventor: Carl and Isabelle Daikeler
- Inception: 2007
- Manufacturer: BODi / Beachbody
- Available: United States, Canada, and the United Kingdom
- Website: www.bodi.com

Shakeology is a line of dietary supplement shakes produced by Beachbody (now known as BODi) and marketed for weight loss and supplemental nutrition. The shakes are sold in powdered form and contain protein, fiber, probiotics, prebiotics, vitamins, minerals, and other ingredients.

Developed in 2007 by the founder of Beachbody and his wife, Shakeology was originally sold through Beachbody’s multi-level marketing network. In 2024, the company transitioned to a direct-sales and affiliate marketing model.

== History ==
In 2007, Beachbody founder Carl Daikeler worked with his wife Isabelle Daikeler to create Shakeology. The product was introduced in 2009. By 2018, Shakeology sales accounted for approximately two-thirds of the company's revenue.

The product was initially distributed through a network of independent sales partners under a multi-level marketing (MLM) model. In 2024, BODi closed down the partner network and moved to direct-to-consumer sales, including affiliate marketing.

== Nutrition ==
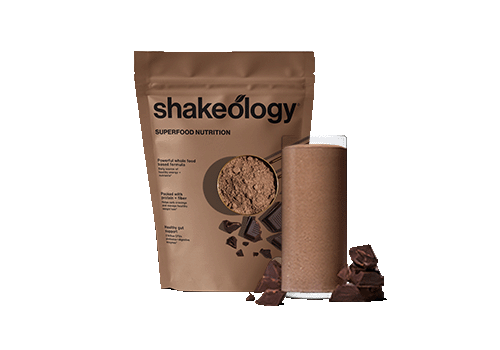
Bag of chocolate Shakeology powder and prepared shake

Each serving of Shakeology typically provides around 130–160 calories, 16–17 grams of protein, and about 7 grams of sugar, depending on the flavor, and varying protein content depending on the formula, with non-vegan versions offering whey protein for higher bioavailability. It also includes digestive enzymes, prebiotics, and probiotics.

The product comes in both dairy-based and vegan formulations, with flavors such as chocolate, vanilla, tropical strawberry, cookies & creamy (US only) and café latte.

In 2024, the company launched a new formula with no added sugar.

Two clinical trials funded by Beachbody examined the effects of Shakeology on appetite and body weight. A 2018 study reported reduced subjective hunger but no statistically significant reduction in subsequent food intake. A 2022 study reported greater weight loss among participants consuming Shakeology as part of a calorie-restricted diet compared to those receiving a lower-protein, lower-fiber control shake. The first authors of both studies were Beachbody employees.
