= Susan M. Gordon =

American intelligence officer

Sue Gordon
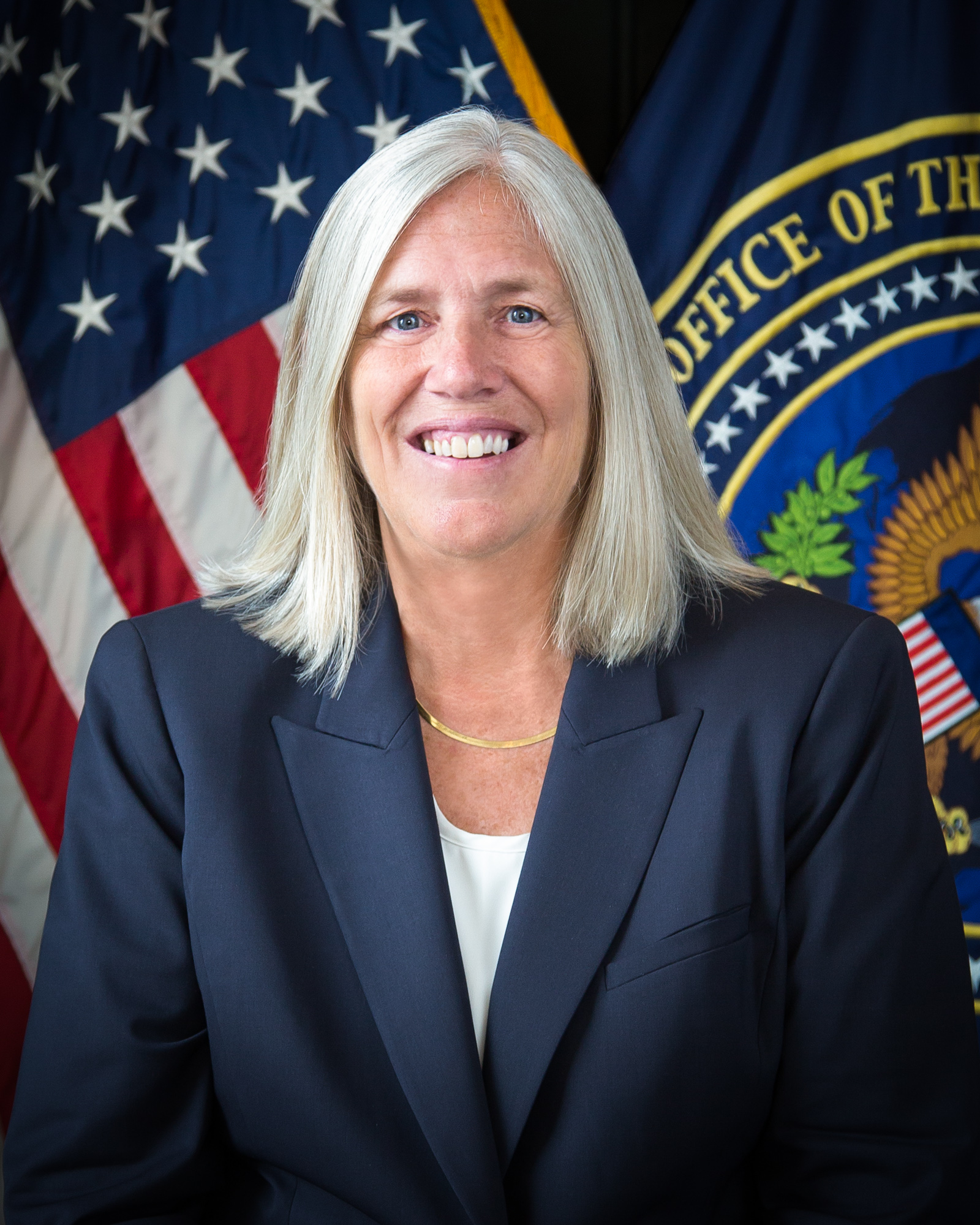
- Official portrait, 2017

Acting Director of National Intelligence
- In office August 15, 2019
- President: Donald Trump
- Preceded by: Dan Coats
- Succeeded by: Joseph Maguire (acting)

5th Principal Deputy Director of National Intelligence
- In office August 7, 2017 – August 15, 2019
- President: Donald Trump
- Director: Dan Coats
- Preceded by: Stephanie O'Sullivan
- Succeeded by: Andrew P. Hallman (as Principal Executive)

Deputy Director of the National Geospatial-Intelligence Agency
- In office January 1, 2015 – August 9, 2017
- President: Barack Obama; Donald Trump
- Preceded by: Michael Rodrigue
- Succeeded by: Justin Poole

Personal details
- Born: Knoxville, Tennessee, U.S.
- Education: Duke University (BS)
- Website: www.gordonventuresllc.com

Susan M. Gordon served as Principal Deputy Director of National Intelligence from August 7, 2017, until August 15, 2019. Prior to assuming that role, she was the Deputy Director of the National Geospatial-Intelligence Agency (NGA), having assumed the position on January 1, 2015. Before joining the NGA, she served as director of the Central Intelligence Agency's Information Operations Center and senior cyber adviser to the Director of the Central Intelligence Agency. Gordon worked for the CIA for more than 25 years.

== Early life and education ==
Gordon obtained a B.S. from Duke University in 1980, majoring in zoology. While at Duke, she was a power forward and the only three-year captain for the Duke Blue Devils women's basketball team in its history.

== Career ==
Gordon joined the Central Intelligence Agency in 1980 where she worked as an analyst in the office of Scientific and Weapons Research Directorate of Intelligence. She later moved to the agency's Directorate of Science & Technology, as well as the first director of the office of Advanced Analytic Tools (AAT), serving in that capacity from July 1996 to October 2000. Gordon was later Deputy Director for Support at the CIA. Prior to assuming deputy directorship of the NGA, Gordon served concurrently as director of the CIA's Information Operations Center and as the CIA director's senior advisor on cyber issues.

President Donald Trump announced on July 28, 2019 that he intended to nominate Republican congressman John Ratcliffe to replace Dan Coats as Director of National Intelligence (DNI), but withdrew Ratcliffe from consideration five days later. After Trump's announcement, it was not immediately clear if he would retain Gordon as acting DNI during Ratcliffe's confirmation process or if she would be retained in the agency upon Ratcliffe's confirmation. Two sources told CNN there was an active search underway and that Gordon was not considered likely to be retained because she "is viewed by some in the administration as someone who is not going to be the type of political loyalist Trump wants in that role." Some Trump allies advised him Gordon was too close to former CIA director John Brennan, an outspoken Trump critic, an assertion Brennan dismissed. One Democratic congressional official told NBC News, "if he appoints anyone other than Sue Gordon as acting DNI, the Senate will raise holy hell". By law, the principal deputy succeeds the director upon a vacancy, but on August 8, 2019 Trump announced Gordon was resigning and appointed the director of the National Counterterrorism Center Joseph Maguire as acting DNI.

Since leaving the Intelligence Community, Gordon has become a member of the advisory board of Pallas Advisors, a national security strategic advisory firm based in Washington, D.C. and the board of CACI. She is also a consultant to Microsoft.

In the book The Madman Theory by Jim Sciutto, Gordon stated in response to Donald Trump challenging of 'loyalty' of people in the Intelligence Community who disagreed with him, "You can say you don't believe intelligence as much as you want. If you're questioning the integrity of the people that put that in front of you, I think that's very difficult because those people, in their own minds, would never lack integrity."

In 2020, Gordon was named a candidate for either Director of National Intelligence or Director of the Central Intelligence Agency as part of the Administrative Presidency of Joe Biden.

As of 2024, Gordon serves on the advisory board of the National Security Space Association. She also serves as vice chair of the board of trustees of the MITRE Corporation.

Government offices
Preceded by Dan Coats	Director of National Intelligence; Acting; 2019	Succeeded by Joseph Maguire; Acting
