= Andrew P. Hallman =

American government official

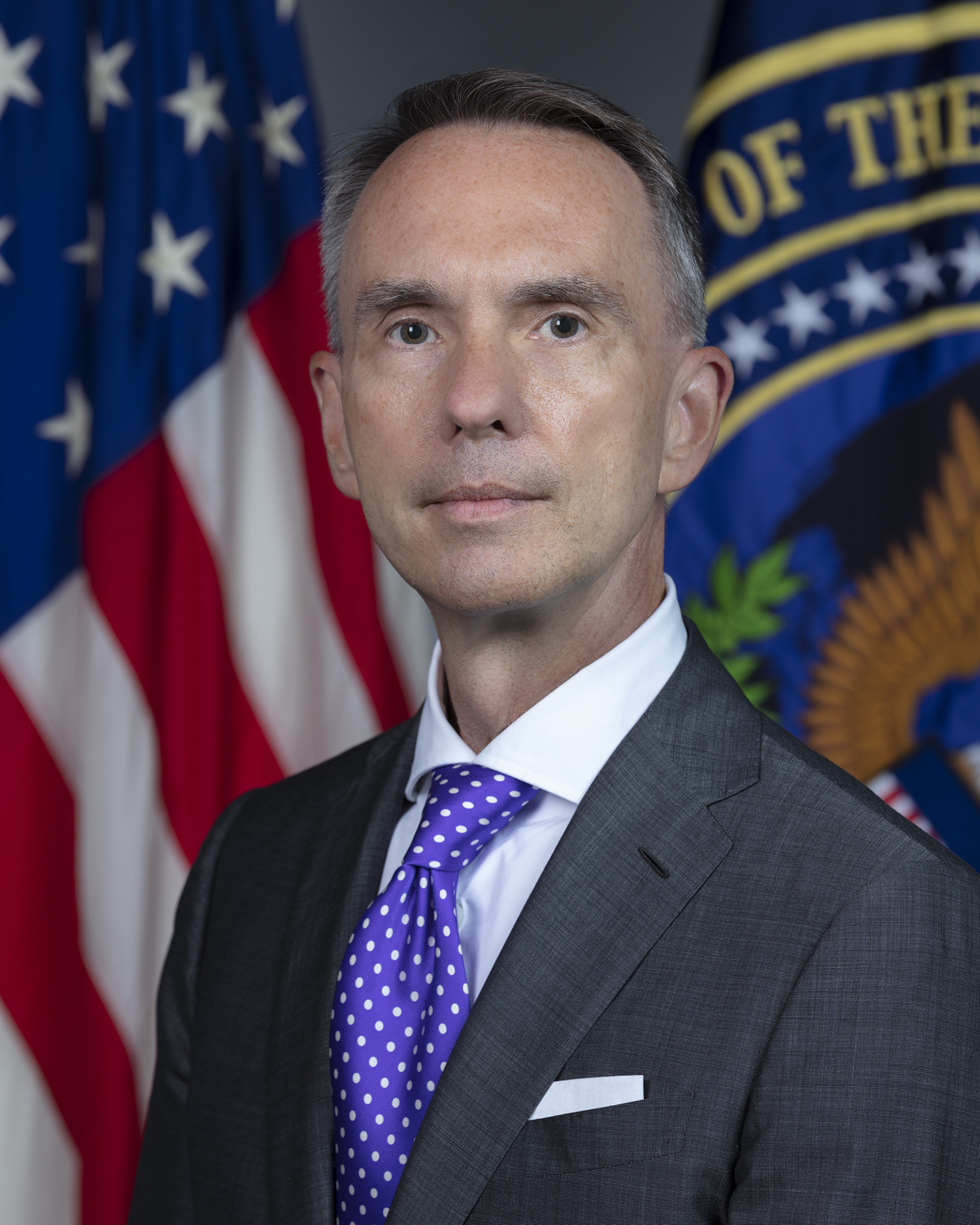

Acting Director of National Intelligence
- In office February 20, 2020
- President: Donald Trump
- Preceded by: Joseph Maguire (acting)
- Succeeded by: Richard Grenell (acting)

Principal Executive of National Intelligence
- In office October 30, 2019 – February 21, 2020
- President: Donald Trump
- Director: Joseph Maguire (acting); Himself (acting); Richard Grenell (acting)
- Preceded by: Susan M. Gordon (as Principal Deputy Director)
- Succeeded by: Kash Patel

Personal details
- Born: Andrew Paul Hallman
- Education: Michigan State University (BS); American University (MA)

Andrew Paul Hallman is an American intelligence official who served as Principal Executive in the Office of the Director of National Intelligence from October 2019 to February 2020. He previously served in the CIA as head of digital innovation.

== Early life and education ==
Hallman studied at Michigan State University, graduating with a Bachelor of Science degree in 1984. He earned a Master of Arts degree in international affairs from the American University School of International Service in 1986.

== Career ==
=== CIA ===
Inspired by one of his professors at the School of International Service, Hallman joined the Central Intelligence Agency (CIA) in 1989, where he would ultimately spend more than 30 years.

During his time at the CIA, Hallman served in the intelligence directorate, before becoming the director of the Directorate of Digital Innovation in 2015, at the request of Director John O. Brennan. Innovations included the use of private-sector cloud computing, as well as the usage of open-source information and the greater integration of new technologies into the CIA's work.

=== Office of National Intelligence ===
Hallman first worked at the Office of the Director of National Intelligence (ODNI) from 2011 to 2013, assisting in the integration of intelligence.

With the resignation of the Principal Deputy Director of National Intelligence, Susan M. Gordon, in August 2019, the new director, Joseph Maguire, was left without a deputy. To rectify this issue, the temporary position of "Principal Executive", the principal deputy director in all but name, was created; Hallman began as Principal Executive on October 30, 2019.

On February 21, 2020, with the replacement of Director Maguire with Richard Grenell, at the instigation of President Donald Trump, Hallman was removed from office as well, reportedly to allow Grenell the freedom to install his own management team. Hallman reportedly returned to the CIA.

He was replaced as Principal Deputy Director of National Intelligence by Kash Patel.

Government offices
Preceded by Joseph Maguire; Acting	Director of National Intelligence; Acting; 2020	Succeeded by Richard Grenell; Acting
