= Political appointments of the Trump administration =

Political appointments by Donald Trump may refer to:

- Political appointments of the first Trump administration (2017–2021)
- Political appointments of the second Trump administration (from 2025)

== See also ==
- Trump administration
