= George Nesterczuk =

American government official

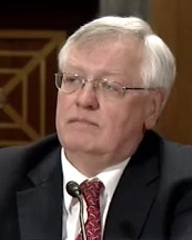
- George Nesterczuk in 2012

Personal details
- Born: Asch, West Germany
- Party: Republican
- Spouse: Oksana
- Children: 2
- Education: Cornell University; University of Maryland

George Nesterczuk is an American political advisor, consultant, and government official. He was nominated by President Donald Trump in June 2017 to become the Director of the United States Office of Personnel Management, but he later withdrew his candidacy over potential delays in the confirmation process.

== Early life and education ==
Nesterczuk was born in Asch, West Germany. He lived in France before moving to the United States, where he graduated from Brooklyn Technical High School. Nesterczuk earned a B.A. in physics from Cornell University in 1967 and an M.S. in astrophysics from the University of Maryland in 1971.

== Career ==
Nesterczuk's first job was at the Goddard Space Flight Center, where he worked as a graduate research assistant. He later became vice president of Atlantic Science Corporation. Nesterczuk became the first director of the Ukrainian National Information Service in 1977 and later served as chairman of the Orphans' Aid Society for Ukraine. In 1978, he joined defense contractor EG&G.

Nesterczuk ran Ronald Reagan's 1980 presidential campaign in Maryland, joining Reagan's transition team after his victory in the general election. Under President Reagan, Nesterczuk became associate director (associate director of administration) in charge of executive personnel at the United States Office of Personnel Management (OPM). He temporarily left his post at the OPM in order to manage Republican Larry Hogan's unsuccessful 1982 U.S. Senate campaign against Democrat Paul Sarbanes. Nesterczuk rejoined the OPM after the election before leaving the agency again in June 1985. He went on to serve at the United States Department of Defense and as chief scientist and technical adviser at the United States Department of Transportation. He left government in 1986 to found the consulting firm Nesterczuk and Associates.

In 1995, Nesterczuk became staff director of the Civil Service Subcommittee of the United States House Committee on Oversight and Government Reform. In 2000, he became vice president of the consulting firm Global USA Inc. and again assumed the role of president of Nesterczuk and Associates.

Nesterczuk rejoined the OPM in 2004 as senior adviser to the director for the Department of Defense, where he played a key role in establishing the National Security Personnel System. In June 2006, he was nominated by President George W. Bush to be vice chairman of the Federal Salary Council for Labor Relations and Pay Policy. Nesterczuk also consulted on an overhaul of Ukraine's civil service system.

Nesterczuk was a member of President Donald Trump's 2016 transition team. In June 2017, Trump nominated him for the position of Director of the United States Office of Personnel Management. The nomination was withdrawn on August 2, 2017, after Nesterczuk wrote Trump, informing him that "partisan attacks" against him were threatening to delay filling the position. To avoid being the cause of additional delays in selecting an OPM director, he asked for his nomination to be withdrawn. In 2020, Acting OPM Director Michael Rigas appointed Nesterczuk as a senior advisor.
