= Joseph Maguire =

American government official and Navy admiral (born 1951)

Joe Maguire
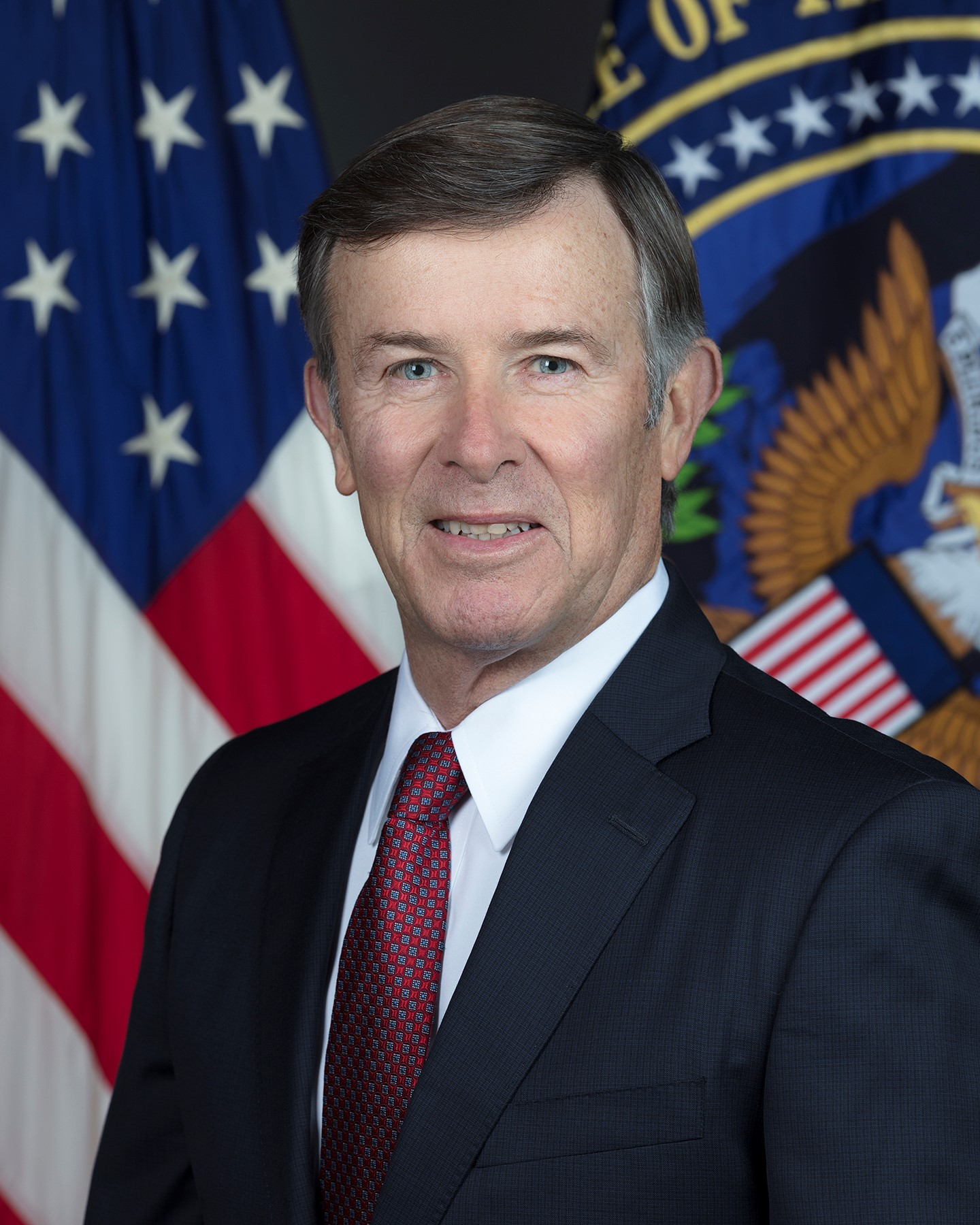

Acting Director of National Intelligence
- In office August 15, 2019 – February 20, 2020
- President: Donald Trump
- Deputy: Andrew P. Hallman
- Preceded by: Susan M. Gordon (acting)
- Succeeded by: Andrew P. Hallman (acting)

5th Director of the National Counterterrorism Center
- In office December 27, 2018 – August 16, 2019
- President: Donald Trump
- Preceded by: Nicholas Rasmussen
- Succeeded by: Christopher C. Miller

Personal details
- Born: August 14, 1951 (age 75) New York City, New York, U.S.
- Education: Manhattan College (BS); Naval Postgraduate School (MS)

Military service
- Allegiance: United States
- Branch/service: United States Navy
- Years of service: 1974−2010
- Rank: Vice Admiral
- Commands: United States Naval Special Warfare Command

Joseph Maguire (born August 14, 1951) is an American officer who served as Director of the National Counterterrorism Center and Acting Director of National Intelligence under President Donald Trump. He retired from the United States Navy as a vice admiral in 2010 after 36 years of military service. Prior to retiring from active duty, he was the deputy director for strategic operational planning at National Counterterrorism Center (NCTC).

Appointed by President Donald Trump, Maguire became Acting Director of National Intelligence on August 16, 2019, a role he held during the Trump–Ukraine scandal. On September 13, 2019, the House Intelligence Committee issued a subpoena to Maguire alleging that he was unlawfully withholding a whistleblower complaint from the committee; he testified before the committee on September 26. Maguire has received numerous military, intelligence, and civilian awards, including the National Intelligence Distinguished Service Medal and the Department of Defense Distinguished Service Medal.

== Early life ==
Maguire is from Brooklyn, New York. He graduated from Manhattan College with a Bachelor of Science degree in 1974.

== Naval career ==
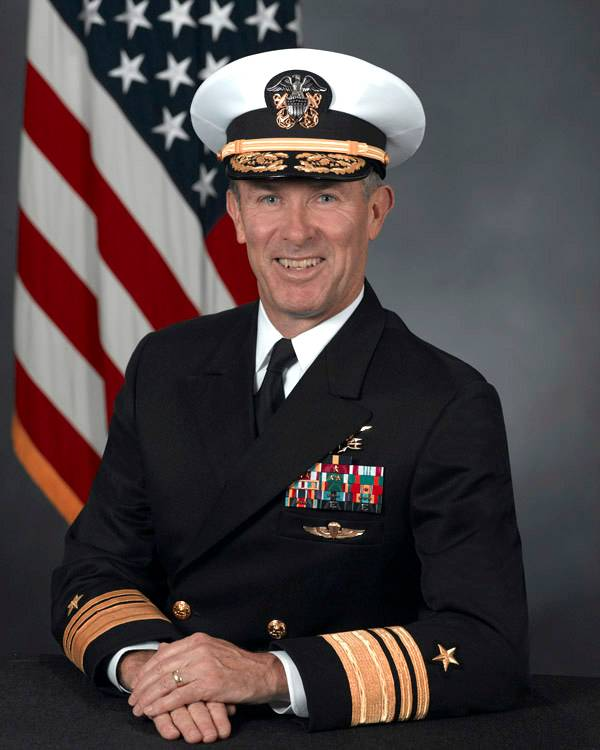
Around 2008

Maguire joined the Navy in November 1974 and spent his career as a Naval Special Warfare Officer. His first sea duty tour assignment was aboard USS Coronado. Maguire then received orders to Basic Underwater Demolition/SEAL training (BUD/S) at Naval Amphibious Base Coronado. After six months of training, Maguire graduated with BUD/S class 93 in July 1977 despite having a broken leg. His first operational assignment was with Underwater Demolition Team Twenty One and received the 1130 designator as a Naval Special Warfare Officer, entitled to wear the Special Warfare Insignia. From 1979 to 1981, Maguire was the Flag Lieutenant to Commander Amphibious Forces Seventh Fleet (CTF 76). Maguire served with SEAL Team Two from January 1982 to July 1983 and completed a deployment to Europe with Naval Special Warfare Unit Two. Maguire attended Naval Postgraduate School in Monterey, California and graduated with a master's degree in Scientific and Technical Intelligence in 1985. His staff tours include operations officer, Naval Special Warfare Group Two from Apr 1985 to January 1987; executive officer, SEAL Delivery Vehicle Team Two from February 1987 to March 1988; Naval Special Warfare's Assignment Officer and Community Manager, Bureau of Naval Personnel, Washington, D.C. from 1989 to 1991; Chief Staff Officer, Naval Special Warfare Development Group from March 1991 to December 1992. He then served as Commanding Officer, SEAL Team Two from December 1992 to 1994. He was a 1994–95 National Security Fellow at Harvard University. He was Commanding Officer, Naval Special Warfare Center from 1997 to 1999 and then Deputy Commander, Naval Special Warfare Command from October 1999 to July 2001.

From 2004 to 2007, Maguire served as Commander, Naval Special Warfare Command. From 2007 until 2010, he was the National Counterterrorism Center's deputy director for strategic operational planning. He retired from the Navy in 2010 with the rank of Vice Admiral.

== Private civilian career ==
After he retired, Maguire went to work as a vice president of Booz Allen Hamilton. He served as the executive director of the Clements Center for National Security at the University of Texas at Austin from 2024 to 2026. Maguire currently serves as Distinguished Senior National Security Fellow at the Clements Center.

Maguire served for three years on the board of the Special Operations Warrior Foundation, a foundation which provides financial assistance to severely wounded special operations troops as well as support for the children of those troops who have died. He then became the President and chief executive officer of the foundation in 2013.

== Government career ==
In June 2018, Maguire was nominated to be the Director of the National Counterterrorism Center by President Donald Trump. This nomination was confirmed by the U.S. Senate in December 2018. He was sworn in on December 27, 2018.

=== Acting Director of National Intelligence ===
On August 8, 2019, President Donald Trump announced that Maguire would become acting Director of National Intelligence (acting DNI) on August 15, 2019. Maguire's designation as acting DNI occurred after the previous director, Dan Coats, resigned from office, and after Trump refused to permit the deputy director, Susan M. Gordon, to become acting DNI.

In February 2020 Trump rebuked Maguire when he heard that one of Maguire's subordinates, an expert on election security, had briefed members of House Intelligence Committee on Russian preference involvement in the 2020 election. Members of the committee were told Russia appeared to prefer Trump over Democratic candidates and could seek to act on that preference as they had done in 2016 election to boost his candidacy. Trump then announced he would be replacing Maguire, who resigned on February 21, 2020, and was immediately replaced with Richard Grenell as acting chief. Reactions of concern were published quickly by former military and intelligence professionals such as William McRaven.

==== Ukraine whistleblower complaint ====
Maguire was acting DNI at the time that a member of the United States Intelligence Community (IC) submitted a formal whistleblower complaint to the Inspector General of the Intelligence Community (IGIC), regarding President Donald Trump's communications with a foreign leader; the complaint said Trump had made a troubling "promise" to the foreign leader. (It was subsequently revealed that the complaint related to a July 2019 phone call between Trump and Ukrainian President Volodymyr Zelenskyy, in which Trump pressed the Ukrainian government to investigate Trump's political rival, former Vice President Joseph R. Biden Jr., and his family).

The whistleblower's complaint was deemed credible and a matter of "urgent concern" by the Inspector General of the Intelligence Community (IGIC). Under federal law, when the IGIC determines that a complaint credibly raises an urgent concern, he or she forwards it to the relevant agency head (here, the DNI), who is required to forward it to the congressional intelligence committees within seven days. In this case, however, Maguire, withheld the complaint from Congress.

Maguire's refusal prompted the House committee to issue a subpoena to Maguire, ordering him to either immediately hand over the whistleblower's complaint to Congress or give testimony to the House Intelligence Committee explaining why he was refusing to do so. Schiff accused Maguire of illegally withholding a properly submitted whistleblower complaint in an unprecedented way, and said that the matter raised "serious concerns about whether White House, Department of Justice or other executive branch officials are trying to prevent a legitimate whistleblower complaint from reaching its intended recipient, the Congress, in order to cover up serious misconduct." Schiff said Maguire has cited a "higher authority, someone above the DNI" in his refusal to turn over the whistleblower complaint.

According to a report in The Washington Post, Maguire threatened to resign as acting DNI over concerns that the Trump administration might attempt to constrain his testimony to Congress over the intelligence whistleblower's complaint. The report said Maguire had "expressed his displeasure to White House counsel Pat Cipollone and others that the White House had put him in the untenable position of denying the material to Congress over a claim that it did not fall within his jurisdiction as leader of the intelligence community". In a statement, Maguire denied that he had contemplated resigning saying, "At no time have I considered resigning my position since assuming this role."

External videos
- Maguire's testimony before the House Intelligence Committee, September 26, 2019, C-SPAN

Maguire initially refused to testify before the House Intelligence Committee at a hearing on September 19, but later agreed to give testimony on the whistleblower complaint in an open session of the House Intelligence Committee on September 26. It was unclear whether Maguire had "forced the White House to acquiesce and allow him to testify without constraint". In a statement, Maguire said he had followed the law "every step of the way ... [was] committed to protecting whistleblowers and ensuring every complaint is handled appropriately ... [and aimed to] work with the Administration and Congress to find a resolution regarding this important matter".

== Personal ==
Maguire and his wife have two children.

== Awards and decorations ==
U.S. military decorations
Navy Distinguished Service Medal
Defense Superior Service Medal (two awards)
Legion of Merit (two awards)
Defense Meritorious Service Medal
Meritorious Service Medal (two awards)
Navy and Marine Corps Commendation Medal (three awards)
Navy Achievement Medal
Joint Meritorious Unit Award
Navy Unit Commendation
U.S. Service (Campaign) Medals and Service and Training Ribbons
National Defense Service Medal with bronze service star
Humanitarian Service Medal with bronze service stars
Navy Sea Service Deployment Ribbon with three bronze service stars
Navy and Marine Corps Overseas Service Ribbon with three bronze service stars
Navy Rifle Marksmanship Badge
Navy Pistol Marksmanship Badge

U.S. badges, patches and tabs
SEAL Trident
Navy and Marine Corps Parachutist Insignia

== Image gallery ==
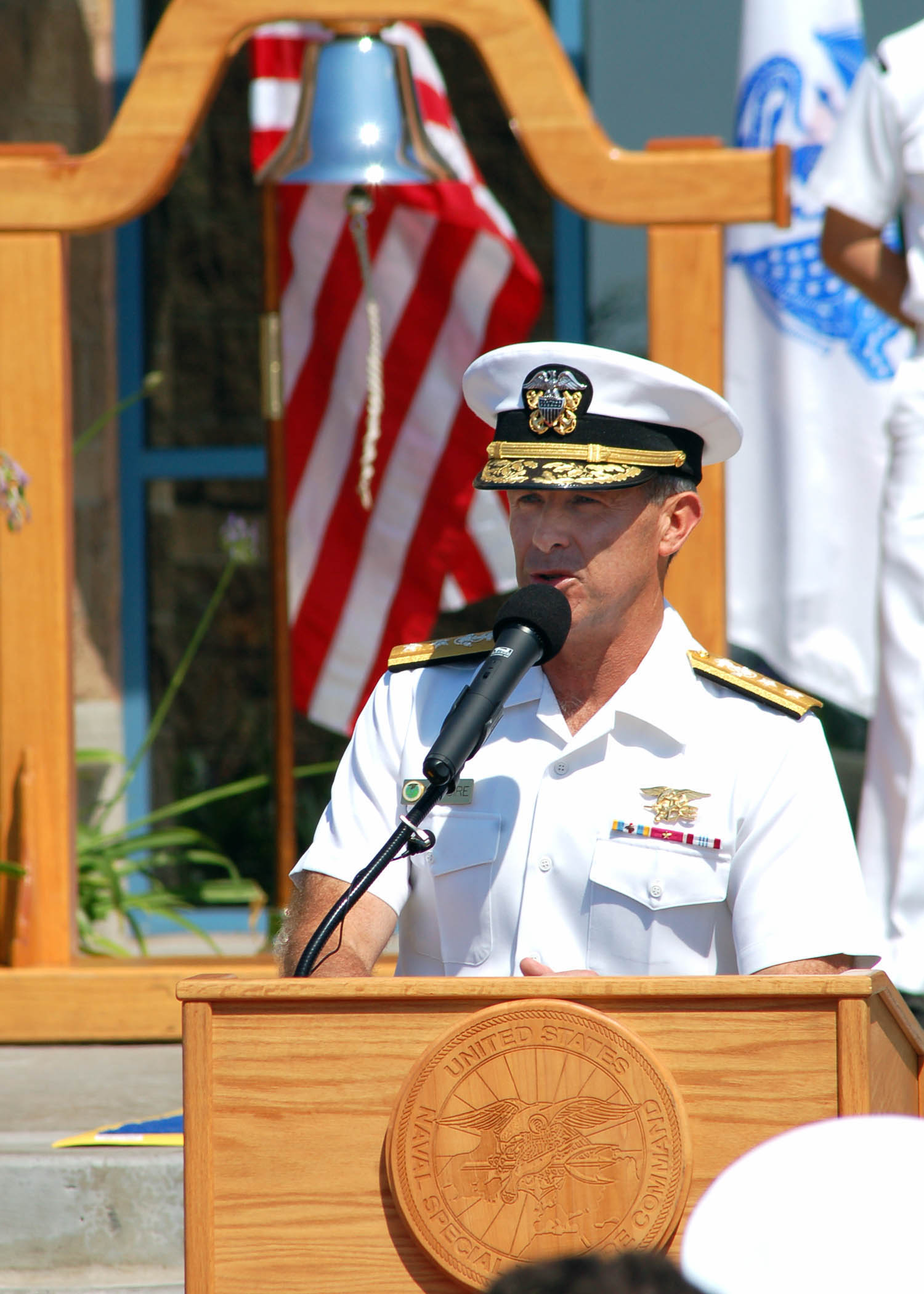
Maguire delivering a speech in June 2006

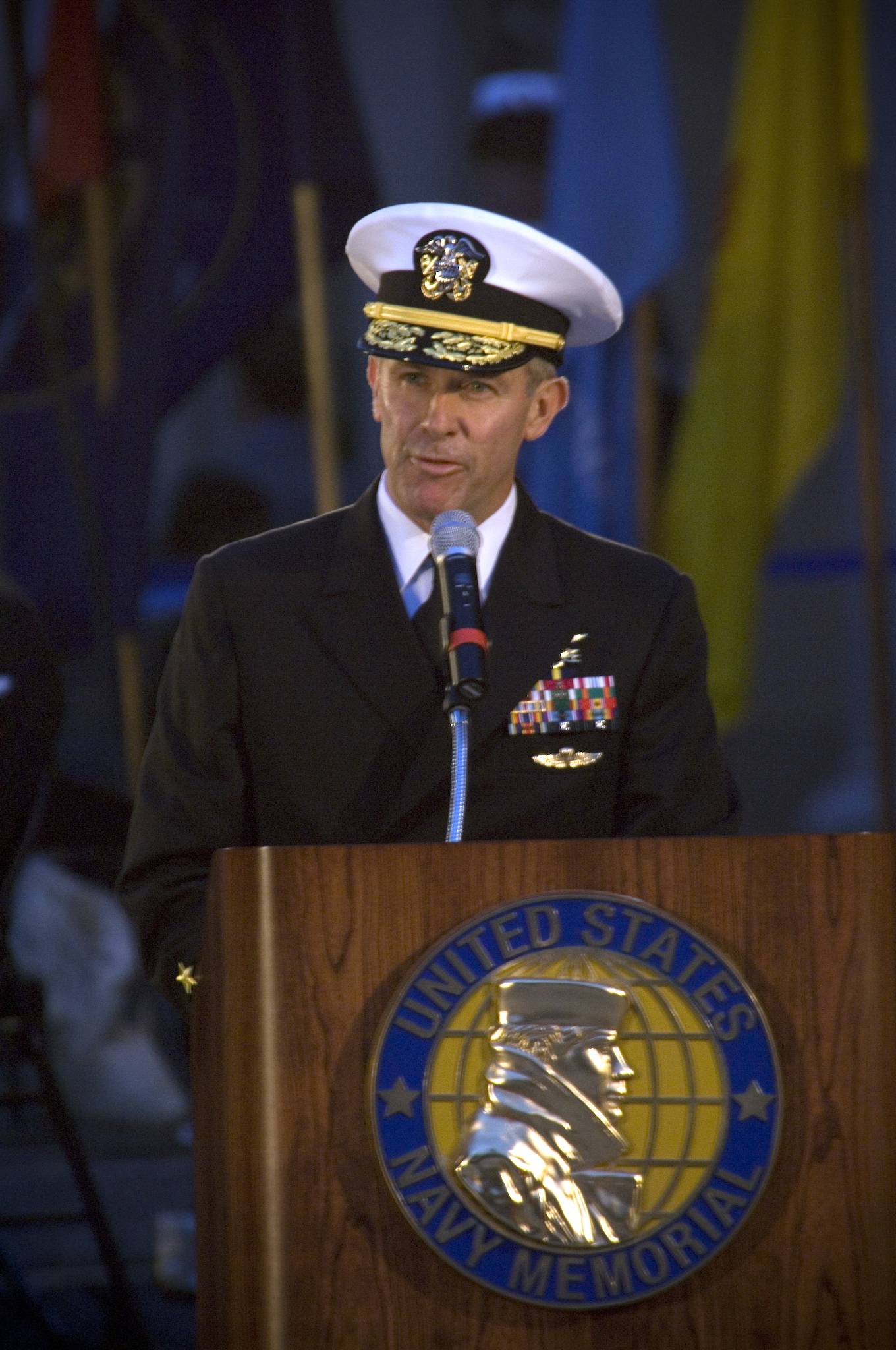
Vice Admiral Joe Maguire, deputy director for Strategic Operational Planning, National Counterterrorism Center, in Navy service blues

Government offices
Preceded by Susan M. Gordon; Acting	Director of National Intelligence; Acting; 2019–2020	Succeeded by Andrew P. Hallman; Acting
