= Tony Horton (personal trainer) =

American personal trainer, author, and former actor (born 1958)

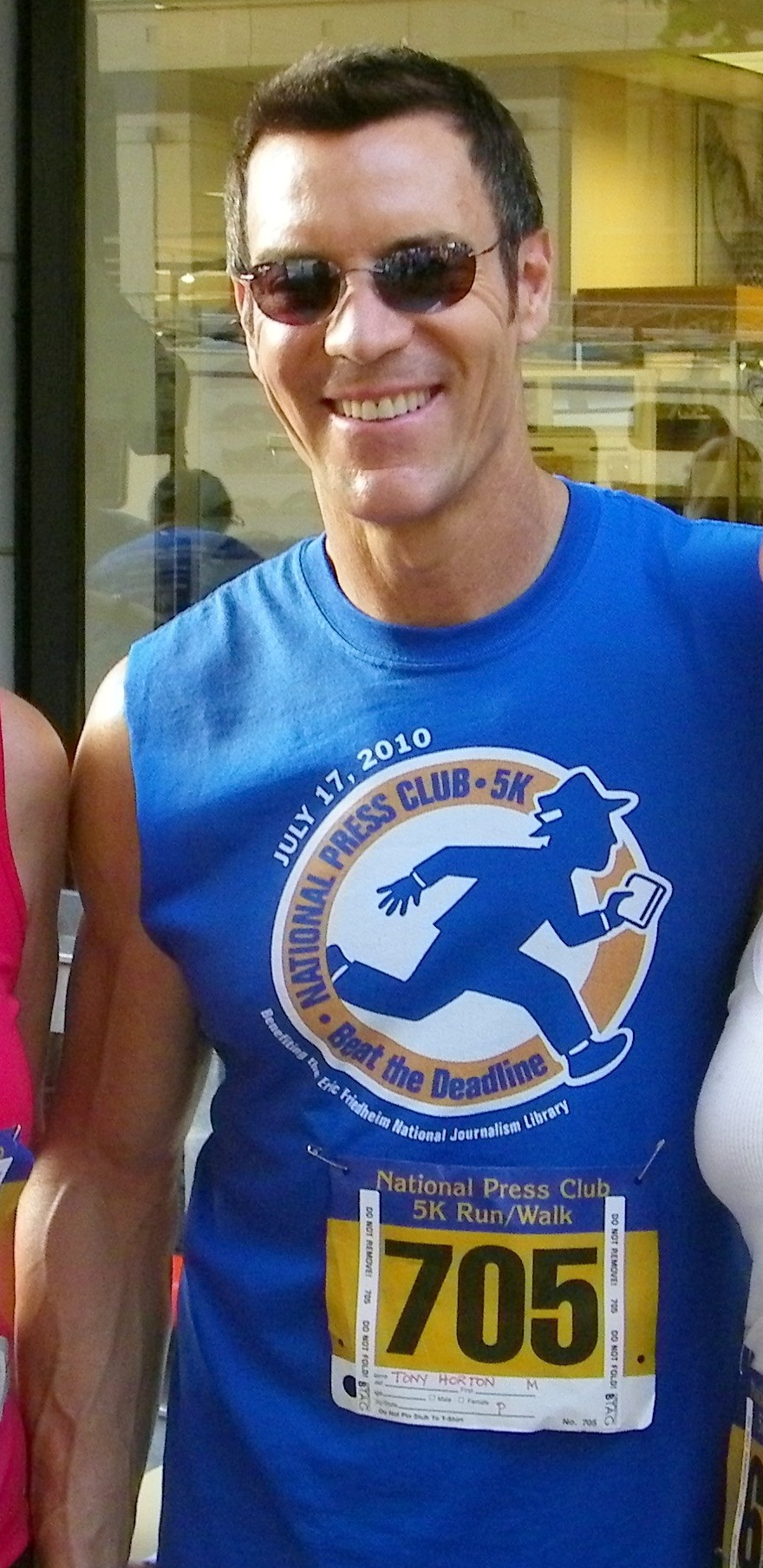
- Horton in 2010
- Born: Anthony Sawyer Horton Jr. July 2, 1958 (age 67); Westerly, Rhode Island, U.S.
- Occupations: Personal trainer, author
- Known for: Creating P90X
- Height: 5 ft 10 in (1.78 m)
- Spouse: Shawna Brannon (m. 2015)
- Website: tonyhortonlife.com

Anthony Sawyer Horton Jr. (born July 2, 1958), known professionally as Tony Horton, is an American personal trainer, author, and former actor. He is best known as the creator of the commercial home exercise regimen P90X.

== Early life ==
Tony Horton was one of 3 children born in Westerly, Rhode Island to Anthony Sawyer Horton (Sr.) and Jean (née Gencarelli) Horton, and was raised in Trumbull, Connecticut. He has two sisters. His family is Roman Catholic. He was a self-described "98-pound weakling" with a speech impediment.

By the time he was 10-years old, his family had moved more than five times. His father served three years in the Army as a 1st Lieutenant, and the family was stationed at various bases around the U.S. His father was a minor league baseball player, golfer, and yachtsman. Tony Horton became interested in fitness when he took a weightlifting class while attending the University of Rhode Island and was a member of Phi Kappa Psi. After graduation, he moved to Southern California and worked various jobs, including as a stand-up comedian and gofer for 20th Century Fox.

== Career ==
After moving to California in 1980, Horton became a personal trainer to an executive at 20th Century Fox, working out of his garage and charging $20 per lesson. His clientele grew, eventually including Bruce Springsteen, Usher, Tom Petty, Billy Idol and Annie Lennox.

He did some improv and worked as an actor. He appeared in a ThighMaster infomercial and a Shakeology commercial and as a spokesperson for NordicTrack. He starred in a number of exercise videos including Power 90, which was marketed by BeachBody. He later created several sequels: P90X (Power 90 Extreme), which was his breakout hit; P90X2, P90X3, and 22 Minute Hard Corps.

In 2017 Horton revealed that he was diagnosed with Ramsay Hunt syndrome type 2.
