= List of dismissals and resignations in the second Trump administration =

Several political appointees appointed by Donald Trump, the 45th and 47th president of the United States, resigned or were dismissed during Trump's second term.

== Department of Health and Human Services ==
Office	Name	Took office	Left office	Notes
Commissioner of Food and Drugs	Marty Makary	April 1, 2025	May 13, 2026	Makary resigned in protest of Trump lifting the agency's ban on the sale of fruit-flavored vapes.

== Department of Homeland Security ==
Office	Name	Took office	Left office	Notes
Secretary of Homeland Security	Kristi Noem	January 25, 2025	March 31, 2026	Noem was fired by Trump due to her misuse of government funds.
Assistant Secretary for Public Affairs in the United States Department of Homeland Security	Tricia McLaughlin	2025	February 17, 2026	McLaughlin resigned amid severe agency turbulence.
Senior Advisor to the Secretary of Homeland Security	Corey Lewandowski	2025	2026	Lewandowski was fired by Trump amidst reports he had an affair with Kristi Noem.

== Department of Justice ==
Office	Name	Took office	Left office	Notes
Attorney General	Pam Bondi	February 5, 2025	April 2, 2026	Bondi was fired by Trump due to her mishandling of the Epstein files.
United States Assistant Attorney General for the National Security Division	John Eisenberg	June 5, 2025	November 6, 2026	Eisenberg resigned on November 6, 2026, as announced by Attorney General Todd Blanche.
United States Assistant Attorney General for the Antitrust Division	Gail Slater	March 12, 2025	February 12, 2026	Slater resigned following insubordination allegations.
United States Assistant Attorney General for the Civil Rights Division	Harmeet Dhillon	April 7, 2025	November 5, 2026	Dhillon resigned
Federal Bureau of Investigation
Deputy Director of the Federal Bureau of Investigation	Dan Bongino	March 17, 2025	January 3, 2026	Bongino resigned.

== Department of Labor ==
Office	Name	Took office	Left office	Notes
United States Secretary of Labor	Lori Chavez-DeRemer	March 11, 2025	April 20, 2026	Chavez-DeRemer resigned following workplace misconduct allegations.

== Department of the Treasury ==
Office	Name	Took office	Left office	Notes
United States Deputy Secretary of the Treasury	Michael Faulkender	March 28, 2025	August 22, 2025	Faulkender resigned following a public feud with Federal Reserve Board Chairman Jerome Powell.
General Counsel for the Department of the Teasury		October 2025	May 18, 2026	Morrissey resigned following the creation of the Anti-Weaponization Fund.
Under Secretary of the Treasury for Terrorism and Financial Intelligence	John Hurley	July 31, 2025	April 28, 2026	Hurley resigned to become the U.S. Ambassador to the O.E.C.D.
Under Secretary of the Treasury for Domestic Finance	Jonathan McKernan	October 10, 2025	July 20, 2026	McKernan resigned in order to maintain the partisan balance of the agency's board of directors.
Assistant Secretary of the Treasury for International Trade and Development	Francis Brooke	October 2025	September 22, 2026	Brooke resigned to become the United States Deputy Secretary of the Treasury.

== Executive Office of the President ==
Office	Name	Took office	Left office	Notes
White House Press Secretary	Karoline Leavitt	January 20, 2025	August 27, 2026	Leavitt resigned to spend more time with her family.
White House Press Secretary	Katie Zacharia	October 12, 2026	October 16, 2026	Zacharia was fired by Trump following public scrutiny regarding her legal credentials and due to her poor performance in her sole press briefing.
White House Chief of Staff	Susie Wiles	January 20, 2025	November 6, 2026	Wiles resigned following the 2026 midterm elections.
Office of the National Cyber Director
National Cyber Director	Sean Cairncross	August 4, 2025	November 19, 2026	Cairncross was dismissed, according to Axios, "for not having "the strong cyber credentials to perform the job."

== Office of the Director of National Intelligence ==
Office	Name	Took office	Left office	Notes
Director of National Intelligence	Tulsi Gabbard	February 12, 2025	June 19, 2026	Gabbard resigned after her husband was diagnosed with bone cancer.
Director of the National Counterterrorism Center	Joe Kent	July 31, 2025	March 17, 2026	Kent resigned in protest of the 2026 Iran war.

== See also ==
- 2025 U.S. Department of Justice resignations
