= The Beachbody Company =

Fitness and nutrition company

- Type: Public
- Traded as: NYSE: BODI
- Industry: Fitness; Streaming media; Dietary supplements
- Founded: 1998; 28 years ago Santa Monica, California, U.S.
- Founders: Carl Daikeler; Jon Congdon
- Headquarters: El Segundo, California, U.S.
- Area served: United States, Canada, United Kingdom, and France
- Brands: Shakeology; P90X
- Revenue: ▼US$820.82 million (2021)
- Website: thebeachbodycompany.com

The Beachbody Company (known simply as BODi) is a publicly traded American fitness and health company based in El Segundo, California. It sells fitness programs and nutrition supplements. Founded in 1998, it is known for its fitness programs P90X and Insanity.

== History ==
=== 1998-2014; Early history ===
Beachbody was founded in 1998 by Carl Daikeler and Jon Congdon in Santa Monica, California. Daikeler was previously in infomercials for Lifeline Gym and :08 Min Abs in the 1990s. The founders received $500,000 in angel investing, developed a series of workout videos and launched the website Beachbody.com. Shortly after its founding, the company implemented a multi-level marketing model.

In 2005, P90X, or Power 90 Extreme, was created by Tony Horton as a commercial home exercise regimen and developed as a successor to the program called "Power 90". It consists of a training program that uses cross-training and periodization, combined with a nutrition and dietary supplement plan. It was heavily marketed through infomercials and celebrity endorsements.

In 2007, customers began selling workout DVDs. In 2014, it surpassed $1 billion in sales.

=== 2015-2022; Streaming and expansion ===
The company announced that it was developing an OTT streaming platform in 2015 that would function similar to Netflix containing all of its exercise workouts previously available on DVD. The platform gained popularity early in the COVID-19 pandemic with more than half a million new subscribers at that time.

Between June and November 2017, advertising watchdog organization Truth in Advertising found that Beachbody distributors were making false and unsubstantiated income claims to promote the company's business opportunity.

In 2017, Beachbody agreed to pay $3.6 million to settle a lawsuit from the city of Santa Monica over automatic credit card renewals. It was alleged that Beachbody was charging its customers' credit cards on an automatic, recurring basis without the required written consent of those customers.

In 2018, Congdon co-founded a personalized nutrition programming and tracking app with "FaceTime for fitness" live group classes called Openfit. The company acquired LeBron James and Arnold Schwarzenegger's Ladder, which develops nutritional products to help athletes with severe cramping after James had issues in the 2014 NBA Finals. The terms of the deal were not disclosed, James and Schwarzenegger remained minority stakeholders.

Due to lockdowns associated with the COVID-19 pandemic, Beachbody On Demand experienced growth of more than 300 percent in new subscribers, passing 2 million overall by April 2020.

A three-way merger between Forest Road Acquisition Corp, Myx Fitness Holdings and Beachbody was entered into in February 2021, which valued the new business combination at $2.9 billion. It was known as The Beachbody Company.

=== 2023 to present; Name change ===
In March 2023, the company changed its name to BODi. The company was subject to a class-action lawsuit in California regarding its classification of independent contractors. The case seeks to require Beachbody to pay its independent distributors ("coaches") up to four years’ worth of unpaid wages and business expenses if they are deemed employees. Later that year, BODi announced a partnership with high-performance coach, Brendon Burchard and a change to its compensation plan for 2024.

In October 2024, The Beachbody Company announced that it would eliminate its multi-level marketing model, transitioning to a single-level affiliate program and a deeper focus on its direct-to-consumer operations effective November 1, 2024, with the existing MLM network to sunset by January 1, 2025. Concurrently, the company announced layoffs impacting approximately 33% of its workforce as part of its broader turnaround strategy.

== Products ==
The Beachbody Company operates under the brand BODi and sells digital fitness subscriptions, nutrition supplements and related wellness and workout products. It is known for its fitness programs that include P90X, Insanity, 21 Day Fix, and LIIFT 4.

The Beachbody Company offers video on demand streaming subscription service for its products through BODi. The Beachbody Company integrated MYXfitness exercise bikes after its purchase of the company in 2021.

The company markets nutrition products, including Shakeology nutrition shakes and sports performance supplements. In 2026, BODi launched a line of P90X sports performance supplements.
