= Gerstell =

Gerstell is a surname. Notable people with the surname include:

- Ellen Gerstell (born 1954), American voice actress
- Glenn S. Gerstell, American lawyer

The surname Gerstell may be of German or Ashkenazi Jewish origin. It is relatively rare and may derive from occupational or geographic roots, though the precise etymology is unclear.

== See also ==
- Gerstell, West Virginia
