= Hunter Biden laptop letter =

Controversy in United States politics

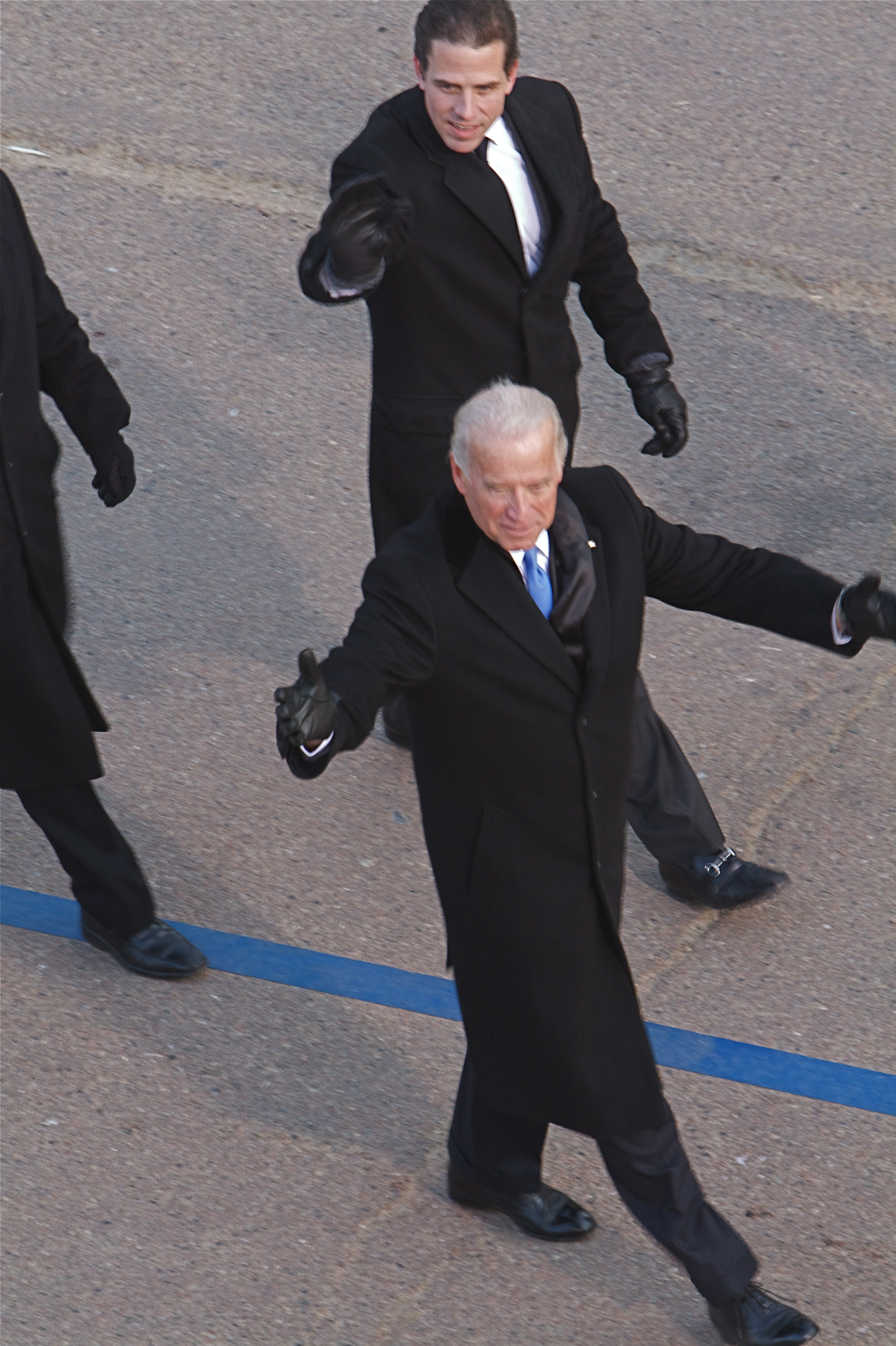
Hunter Biden and then Vice President Joe Biden in 2009

On October 14, 2020, the Hunter Biden laptop controversy began when the New York Post published a story about a laptop that belonged to Hunter Biden that had been abandoned at a Delaware computer shop in 2019. Five days later, a group of 51 former senior intelligence officials who had served in four different administrations, including the Trump administration, issued the Hunter Biden laptop letter, an open letter stating that the laptop "has all the classic earmarks of a Russian information operation".

By May 2023, no evidence had publicly surfaced to support suspicions that the laptop was part of a Russian disinformation scheme. FBI investigators handling Hunter Biden's laptop quickly concluded in 2019 "that the laptop was genuinely his and did not seem to have been tampered with or manipulated". PolitiFact wrote in June 2021 that the laptop did belong to Hunter Biden, but did not demonstrate wrongdoing by Joe Biden.

== Details ==
On October 16, 2020, three days prior to the letter's release, House Intelligence Committee chairman Adam Schiff said on CNN, "Well we know that this whole smear on Joe Biden comes from the Kremlin ... Clearly, the origins of this whole smear are from the Kremlin, and the president is only too happy to have Kremlin help and try to amplify it," though Schiff did not specifically refer to the laptop story. During an interview with Fox News on October 19, 2020, Trump's Director of National Intelligence (DNI) John Ratcliffe disputed Schiff's statement, saying "there is no intelligence that supports that", and accused Schiff of mischaracterizing the views of the intelligence community by describing the alleged emails as part of a smear campaign against Joe Biden. Schiff's spokesman accused Ratcliffe of "purposefully misrepresenting" the congressman's words. In March 2021, the intelligence community, now under control of the Biden Administration, released analysis claiming proxies of Russian intelligence promoted and laundered misleading or unsubstantiated narratives about the Bidens "to US media organizations, US officials, and prominent US individuals, including some close to former President Trump and his administration".

Further dispute over the interpretation of the letter arose when, on the day of its release, Politico published a story with the misleading headline, "Hunter Biden story is Russian disinfo, dozens of former intel officials say," though the body of the story did not support that wording. Instead, the story's lede accurately quoted the letter's words: "has all the classic earmarks of a Russian information operation". During the second 2020 presidential debate held on October 22, 2020, Joe Biden repeated the article's misleading claim in stating, "Look, there are 50 former national intelligence folks who said that what he’s accusing me of is a Russian plan". He would later repeat the claim in a 60 Minutes interview held on October 25, 2020.

Republican congressmen Jim Jordan and Mike Turner said that Michael Morell, a signatory of the letter and former deputy director of the CIA under President Obama, testified before Congress in April 2023 about events leading up to the publication of the letter. Morell revealed that on or around October 17, 2020, Antony Blinken, then a senior adviser to the Biden campaign, called him to discuss the laptop story. Jordan and Turner highlighted that, according to Morell, the phone call with Blinken "set in motion the events that led to" the publication of the letter. The congressmen said that retired CIA officer David Cariens had informed them via email that the agency's Prepublication Classification Review Board approved the letter and helped recruit signatories.

== Reactions ==
Many Republicans and their allies have since cited the Politico headline to insist the intelligence community had lied for the benefit of Joe Biden in the election weeks later and The Wall Street Journal noted in 2022 how failure on the part of several media outlets to thoroughly investigate the Biden campaign's claims played a role in shaping public perception prior to the election.

On February 13, 2023, The Washington Post fact-checker wrote that the Politico headline "likely shaped perceptions of the letter that continue to this day". Former Director of National Intelligence James Clapper asserted the letter's message had been distorted, saying "all we were doing was raising a yellow flag that this could be Russian disinformation. Politico deliberately distorted what we said. It was clear in paragraph five." Another signer, longtime State Department and intelligence official Thomas Fingar remarked, "No one who has spent time in Washington should be surprised that journalists and politicians willfully or unintentionally misconstrue oral or written statements." Despite the criticism, Politico stood by the story.

Former Politico reporters Marc Caputo and Tara Palmeri said on 23 January 2025 that, because of "dumb decisions of cowardly editors", they were told "Don’t write about the laptop, don’t talk about the laptop, don’t tweet about the laptop". Caputo said the Politico story about the letter had a "terrible, ill-fated headline ... because the Hunter Biden laptop appeared to be true".

=== Revocation of security clearances ===
On January 20, 2025, Donald Trump issued an executive order (titled "Holding Former Government Officials Accountable for Election Interference and Improper Disclosure of Sensitive Governmental Information") revoking the security clearances of all the officials who signed the letter. The executive order states "The signatories willfully weaponized the gravitas of the Intelligence Community to manipulate the political process and undermine our democratic institutions". Lawyers including Mark Zaid and Dan Meyer said that the revocation can be challenged in court.

== Signatories ==
Name	Agency	Positions held	Current position
Jim Clapper	DNI	Director of National Intelligence (2010–2017) Under Secretary of Defense for Intelligence; Director of the National Geospatial-Intelligence Agency; Director of the Defense Intelligence Agency	CNN National Security Analyst
Michael Hayden	CIA	Director, Central Intelligence Agency (2006–2009)	George Mason University Visiting Professor
Leon Panetta	CIA	Director, Central Intelligence Agency (2009–2011) Secretary of Defense	
John Brennan	CIA	Director, Central Intelligence Agency (2013–2017) White House Homeland Security and Counterterrorism Advisor; Director, Terrorism Threat Integration Center; Analyst and Operations Officer, Central Intelligence Agency	NBC News and MSNBC National Security Analyst
Thomas Fingar	DNI	Chair, National Intelligence Council (2005–2008) Deputy Director of National Intelligence for Analysis; Assistant Secretary for Intelligence and Research, Department of State	Stanford University, Payne Distinguished Lecturer National Committee on United States–China Relations, Board of Directors
Rick Ledgett	NSA	Deputy Director of the National Security Agency (2014–2017)	M&T Bank, Board of Directors
John McLaughlin	CIA	Acting Director, Central Intelligence Agency (2004) Deputy Director of the Central Intelligence Agency; Director of Analysis, Central Intelligence Agency; Director, Slavic and Eurasian Analysis, Central Intelligence Agency	Johns Hopkins University Distinguished Practitioner-in-Residence
Michael Morell	CIA	Acting Director, Central Intelligence Agency (2012–2013) Deputy Director of the Central Intelligence Agency; Director of Analysis, Central Intelligence Agency	Beacon Global Strategies Senior Counselor
Mike Vickers	DoD	Under Secretary of Defense for Intelligence (2011–2015) Operations Officer, Central Intelligence Agency	BAE Systems Board of Directors
Doug Wise	DIA	Deputy Director Defense Intelligence Agency Senior CIA Operations Officer	
Nick Rasmussen	DNI	Director, National Counterterrorism Center (2014–2017)	
Russ Travers	DNI	Acting Director, National Counterterrorism Center (2018–2020) Deputy Director, National Counterterrorism Center; Analyst of the Soviet Union and Russia, Defense Intelligence Agency	Deputy Homeland Security Advisor
Andy Liepman	DNI	Deputy Director, National Counterterrorism Center Senior Intelligence Officer, Central Intelligence Agency	RAND Corporation, Senior Policy Analyst
John Moseman	CIA	Chief of Staff, Central Intelligence Agency Director of Congressional Affairs, Central Intelligence Agency; Minority Staff Director, United States Senate Select Committee on Intelligence	
Larry Pfeiffer	CIA	Chief of Staff, Central Intelligence Agency Director, White House Situation Room	Michael V. Hayden Center for Intelligence, Policy, and International Security, George Mason University, Director
Jeremy Bash	CIA	Chief of Staff, Central Intelligence Agency Chief of Staff, Department of Defense; Chief Counsel, House Permanent Select Committee on Intelligence	Beacon Global Strategies, Managing Director
Rodney Snyder	CIA	Chief of Staff, Central Intelligence Agency Director of Intelligence Programs, National Security Council; Chief of Station, Central Intelligence Agency	
Glenn Gerstell	NSA	General Counsel, National Security Agency	Beacon Global Strategies
David B. Buckley	CIA	Inspector General, Central Intelligence Agency Democratic Staff Director, House Permanent Select Committee on Intelligence; Counterespionage Case Officer, United States Air Force	United States House Select Committee on the January 6 Attack, Staff Director
Nada Bakos	CIA	Analyst and Targeting Officer, Central Intelligence Agency	Foreign Policy Research Institute, Senior Fellow
Patty Brandmaier	CIA	Senior Intelligence Officer, Central Intelligence Agency Deputy Associate Director for Military Affairs, Central Intelligence Agency; Deputy Director of Congressional Affairs, Central Intelligence Agency	Died in 2023
James B. Bruce	CIA	Senior Intelligence Officer, Central Intelligence Agency Senior Intelligence Officer, National Intelligence Council	RAND Corporation, Adjunct Researcher
David Cariens	CIA	Intelligence Analyst, Central Intelligence Agency	
Janice Cariens	CIA	Operational Support Officer, Central Intelligence Agency	
Paul Kolbe	CIA	Senior Operations Officer, Central Intelligence Agency Chief, Central Eurasia Division, Central Intelligence Agency	Belfer Center for Science and International Affairs, Senior Fellow
Peter Corsell	CIA	Analyst, Central Intelligence Agency	I Squared Capital, Partner
Brett Davis	CIA	Senior Intelligence Officer, Central Intelligence Agency Deputy Director of the Special Activities Center for Expeditionary Operations, CIA	New North Ventures, Partner; Died in 2023
Roger Zane George	CIA	National Intelligence Officer	Occidental College, Professor
Steven L. Hall	CIA	Senior Intelligence Officer, Central Intelligence Agency Chief of Russian Operations, Central Intelligence Agency	CNN contributor
Kent Harrington	CIA	National Intelligence Officer for East Asia, Central Intelligence Agency Director of Public Affairs, Central Intelligence Agency; Chief of Station, Central Intelligence Agency; Analyst, Central Intelligence Agency	
Don Hepburn	CIA	Senior National Security Executive	Boanerges Solutions, President
Timothy D. Kilbourn	CIA	Dean, Sherman Kent School of Intelligence Analysis, Central Intelligence Agency PDB Briefer to President George W. Bush, Central Intelligence Agency	
Ron Marks	CIA	Officer, Central Intelligence Agency Twice former staff of the Republican Majority Leader	George Mason University, Visiting Professor
Jonna Hiestand Mendez	CIA	Technical Operations Officer, Central Intelligence Agency	
Emile Nakhleh	CIA	Director of the Political Islam Strategic Analysis Program, Central Intelligence Agency Senior Intelligence Analyst, Central Intelligence Agency	University of New Mexico, Director of National Security Programs
Gerald A. O'Shea	CIA	Senior Operations Officer, Central Intelligence Agency Served four tours as Chief of Station, Central Intelligence Agency	
David Priess	CIA	Analyst and Manager, Central Intelligence Agency PDB Briefer, Central Intelligence Agency	Michael V. Hayden Center for Intelligence, Policy, and International Security, George Mason University, Senior Fellow
Pam Purcilly	CIA	Deputy Director of Analysis, Central Intelligence Agency Director of the Office of Russian and European Analysis, Central Intelligence Agency; PDB Briefer to President George W. Bush, Central Intelligence Agency	
Marc Polymeropoulos	CIA	Senior Operations Officer, Central Intelligence Agency Acting Chief of Operations for Europe and Eurasia, Central Intelligence Agency	Atlantic Council, Nonresident Senior Fellow
Chris Savos	CIA	Senior Intelligence Officer, Central Intelligence Officer	
Nick Shapiro	CIA	Deputy Chief of Staff and Senior Advisor to the Director, Central Intelligence Agency	Tulane University
John Sipher	CIA	Senior Operations Officer, Central Intelligence Agency Deputy Chief of Russian Operations, Central Intelligence Agency	Atlantic Council, Nonresident Senior Fellow
Stephen Slick	CIA	Senior Director for Intelligence Programs, National Security Council Senior Operations Office, Central Intelligence Agency	University of Texas at Austin, Director of Intelligence Studies Project
Cynthia Strand	CIA	Deputy Assistant Director for Global Issues, Central Intelligence Agency	
Greg Tarbell	CIA	Deputy Executive Director, Central Intelligence Agency Analyst of the Soviet Union and Russia, Central Intelligence Agency	
David Terry	CIA	Chairman of the National Intelligence Collection Board Chief of the PDB, Central Intelligence Agency; PDB Briefer to Vice President Dick Cheney, Central Intelligence Agency	
Greg Treverton	DNI	Chair, National Intelligence Council	University of Southern California, Professor
John Tullius	CIA	Senior Intelligence Officer, Central Intelligence Agency	Naval Postgraduate School, National Intelligence Chair
David A. Vanell	CIA	Senior Operations Officer, Central Intelligence Agency	
Winston Wiley	CIA	Director of Analysis, Central Intelligence Agency Chief, Counterterrorism Center, Central Intelligence Agency	
Kristin Wood	CIA	Senior Intelligence Officer, Central Intelligence Agency PDB Briefer, Central Intelligence Agency	Belfer Center for Science and International Affairs, Non-Resident Fellow

In addition, nine additional former IC officers who could not be named publicly also supported the arguments in this letter.
