= Brett M. Holmgren =

American lawyer & intelligence official

Brett Holmgren
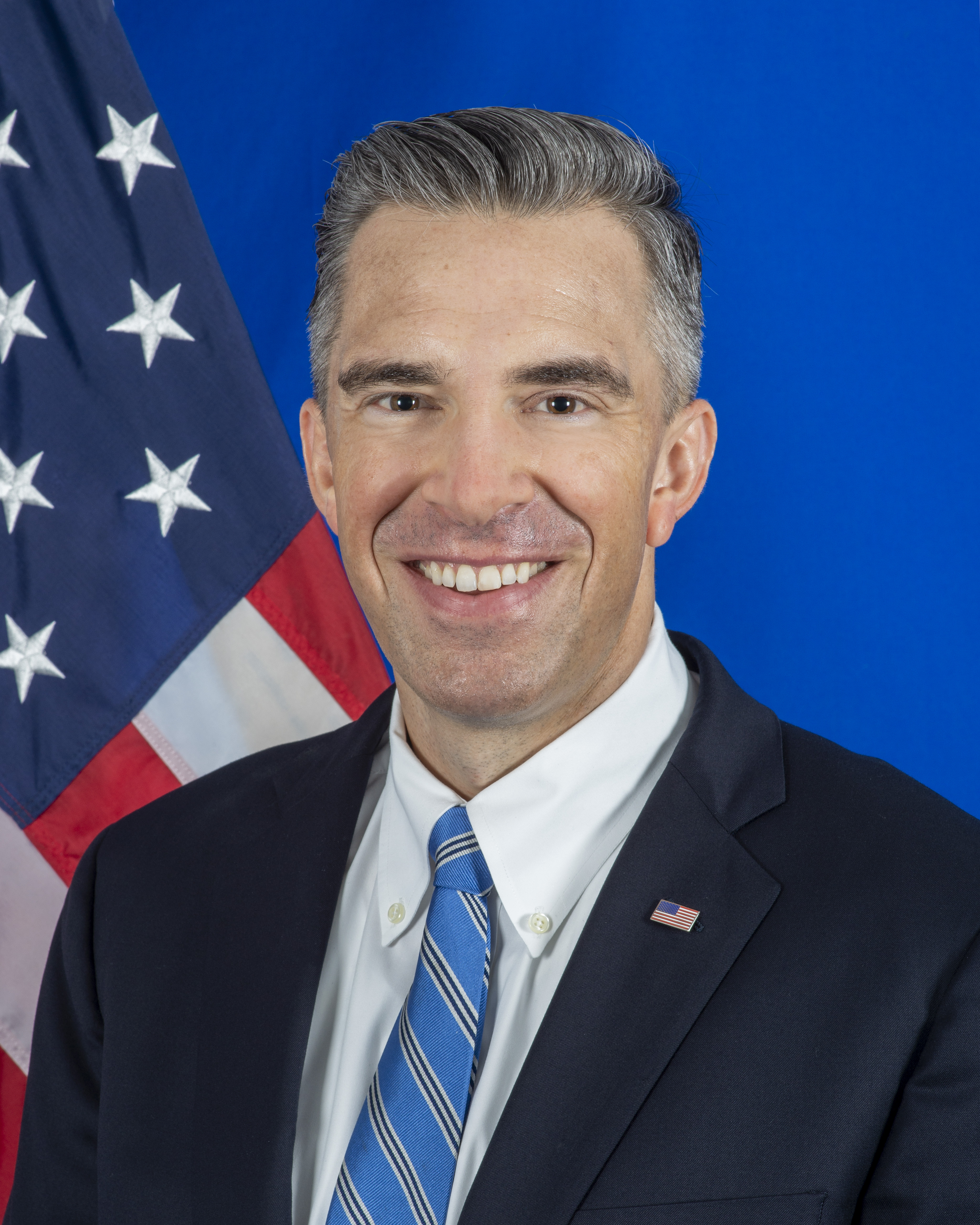

Acting Director of the National Counterterrorism Center
- In office July 5, 2024 – January 20, 2025
- President: Joe Biden
- Preceded by: Christine Abizaid
- Succeeded by: Don Holstead (Acting)

21st Assistant Secretary of State for Intelligence and Research
- In office September 15, 2021 – July 5, 2024
- President: Joe Biden
- Preceded by: Ellen E. McCarthy
- Succeeded by: Michael Vance

Personal details
- Born: Brett Michael Holmgren; June 30, 1981 Minneapolis, Minnesota, U.S.
- Party: Democratic
- Spouse: Dana Remus (m. 2018)
- Education: University of Wisconsin, Madison (BA); Johns Hopkins University (MA)

Brett Michael Holmgren is an American intelligence official who served as the assistant secretary of state for intelligence and research in the Biden administration from 2021 to 2024. He also served as the acting director for the National Counterterrorism Center from 2024 to 2025.

== Education ==
Holmgren earned a Bachelor of Arts degree in political science and journalism from the University of Wisconsin–Madison and a Master of Arts degree, summa cum laude, in global security studies from Johns Hopkins University.

== Career ==
For fourteen years Holmgren held top leadership positions the Intelligence Community (IC), in the White House and at the Department of Defense, including three years in the private industry, before becoming Assistant Secretary. He began his government service as a counterterrorism analyst at the Defense Intelligence Agency and served as the special assistant to the deputy secretary of defense, director for counterterrorism at the United States National Security Council, and a political analyst at the Central Intelligence Agency. He also served as special assistant to the president and senior director for intelligence programs at the National Security Council, where he also previously served as senior policy advisor to the homeland security advisor. He was most recently the vice president for technology risk management at Capital One. He was also a deputy for nominations on the Biden–Harris transition team and co-chair of the intelligence working group for the Joe Biden 2020 presidential campaign. On September 13, 2021, Holmgren was confirmed by the United States Senate by voice vote. He was sworn in on September 15, 2021. Holmgren was appointed acting Director of National Counterterrorism Center on July 18, 2024.

== Awards and recognition ==
Holmgren is the recipient of numerous performance awards, including the National Intelligence Superior Service Medal, the Central Intelligence Agency Director's award, and the Secretary of Defense Exceptional Civilian Service Award.

== Personal life ==
Holmgren grew up in Minnesota with his parents and three siblings. Holmgren married lawyer and government official Dana Remus in 2018. Their wedding was officiated by Barack Obama. They have one son.

Political offices
Preceded by Kin W. Moy; Acting	Assistant Secretary of State for Intelligence and Research; 2021–2024
