= International reaction to the 2007 Pakistani state of emergency =

This entry lists international reaction to the 2007 Pakistani state of emergency.

== Asia ==
- Afghanistan - Foreign ministry spokesman Sultan Ahmad Baheen said, "Security and stability in Pakistan directly affect the situation in Afghanistan and vice versa...We are following the situation in Pakistan with concern and very seriously. We want stability and peace in our neighbouring country."
- Bangladesh - Bangladesh Interim Foreign Minister Iftekhar Ahmed Chowdhury said, "As a friendly country, Bangladesh is observing the developments in Pakistan very closely. We view those events as their internal matter" "However, we hope that (it does) not lead to any kind of instability"
- China - Chinese Foreign Ministry spokesman Liu Jianchao has issued the following statement: "We are concerned about the situation in Pakistan, and believe the Pakistani government and people are capable of solving their problems"
  - Hong Kong - The Security Bureau reminded Hong Kong residents travelling to Pakistan to pay attention to personal safety and keep themselves up-to-date on developments there. A spokesman for the bureau said the Hong Kong Government would continue to closely monitor the situation.

== Europe ==
- France - The French Foreign Ministry asked Musharraf to begin a political dialogue and maintain the rule of law.
- Germany - German Ministry for Economic Cooperation and Development spokesman Markus Weidling said that "development cooperation projects – for example energy projects – must be thought over in the light of future developments in close consultation with other international partners." Weidling also declared that "the advancement of civil society, particularly women and children, will be supported in future as well, without limitation."
- Netherlands - Bert Koenders, Minister of Development Cooperation, announced that the Netherlands would freeze development aid to Pakistan. Koenders said Musharraf's move was a "dramatic power grab that's bad for democracy, the people and the development of Pakistan".
- Norway - Norwegian Foreign Minister Jonas Gahr Støre has in a press release expressed concern over the situation in Pakistan. The fact that the state of emergency directly infringes on the independence of the judiciary and the media is particularly regrettable, according to the minister. He states that Norway, in cooperation with other countries will work towards making it possible for Pakistan to hold Parliamentary elections as planned. Pakistan is facing big challenges both within its own borders and in a region marked by instability. This makes it all the more important than Pakistan achieves legitimate and stable governance, says Støre.
- Sweden - Foreign minister Carl Bildt said that it is important to view the "threats" in Pakistan seriously, but added that: "It is the building of rule of law and open democracy that is, in the long term, the only safe weapon against fundamentalism and terrorism."
- United Kingdom - David Miliband, Foreign Secretary, expressed concern over the situation and said it was vital that Pakistan "abides by the commitment to hold free and fair elections on schedule". The United Kingdom had advance knowledge of the declaration of a state of emergency. A Musharraf aide said: "There was pressure from the US and Britain in the beginning. But later on, when the government gave them the detail that elections will be held on time, and the president will take off his uniform, they did not have any objections". A Foreign Office official insisted "no consent was implied or given".

== North America ==
- Canada - Foreign Affairs Minister Maxime Bernier said "These measures undermine democratic development, judicial independence and the possibility of free and fair elections to which the people of Pakistan are entitled."
- United States - US Secretary of State Condoleezza Rice said just before the imposition of a state of emergency that "the United States would not be supportive of extra-constitutional means... Pakistan needs to prepare for and hold free and fair elections." After the declaration she said that she was "deeply disturbed." Rice also said to media that "It is in the best interests of Pakistan and the Pakistani people for there to be a prompt return to the constitutional course, for there to be an affirmation that elections will be held for a new parliament and for all parties to act with restraint in what is obviously a very difficult situation." White House National Security Council spokesman Gordon Johndroe called the action "very disappointing" and added that Musharraf "needs to stand by his pledges to have free and fair elections in January and step down as chief of army staff before retaking the presidential oath of office." The day before the declaration of emergency Admiral William J. Fallon chief of United States (CENTCOM) was in Pakistan where he met with Musharraf to discuss issues of mutual interest. The United States has no plans to suspend military aid to Pakistan in response to a declaration of emergency by President Pervez Musharraf, although Defense Secretary Robert Gates said that the US would review all assistance programs. Officials say that the United States is unlikely to impose significant sanctions. On 5 November the US announced that because of the current political situation it was suspending annual defense talks with Pakistan. The Deputy Secretary of State for the U.S. called "Musharraf" as an indispensable ally of the United States against the War on Terror. On 8 November US President George W. Bush spoke with Pervez Musharraf for twenty minutes on the telephone, in what Bush called a "very frank discussion." Bush said that he told Musharraf that elections need to be held soon and that Musharraf must step down as head of the military.

On 16 November 2007 US special envoy John Negroponte, having met with Pervez Musharraf and Ashfaq Kayani (Vice Chief of Army Staff) praised the general for prosperity in Pakistan and his action against extremism. He also said that he has urged that the State of Emergency be lifted and opponents released prior to the election.

== Oceania ==
- Australia - Prime Minister John Howard telephoned General Musharraf and called for restraint and a return to democracy. Howard later said "whilst I retain considerable respect and admiration for the strong stance he has taken against terrorism, that Australia could not support in any way any extra-constitutional behaviour, that the rule of law had to prevail. And that I hoped there would be an early return to a more democratic past."

== International organizations ==
- Commonwealth of Nations - Secretary-General Don McKinnon described the situation as "a matter of deep concern" and said "It is a step in the wrong direction". On 12 November, the Commonwealth asked Pakistan to end emergency by 22 November or face suspension from the body. On 22 November, Pakistan was suspended from the Commonwealth for its failure to fulfill this condition. The CMAG said that even though it was earlier it was indicated that President Musharraf will step down as army chief and several detained protesters were freed in last ten days, the situation in Pakistan was still in violation of the Commonwealth's fundamental values.
- United Nations - Louise Arbour, the UN High Commissioner for Human Rights, expressed some concern over the situation, noting that a UN official, Asma Jahangir, was among the judicial and political officials detained. The commissioner also noted that UN prohibitions on actions such as torture and arbitrary detention remain in effect during times of national emergency, and that such actions must be related to and proportional with the emergency itself.
