= John Abizaid =

American military leader & diplomat (born 1951)

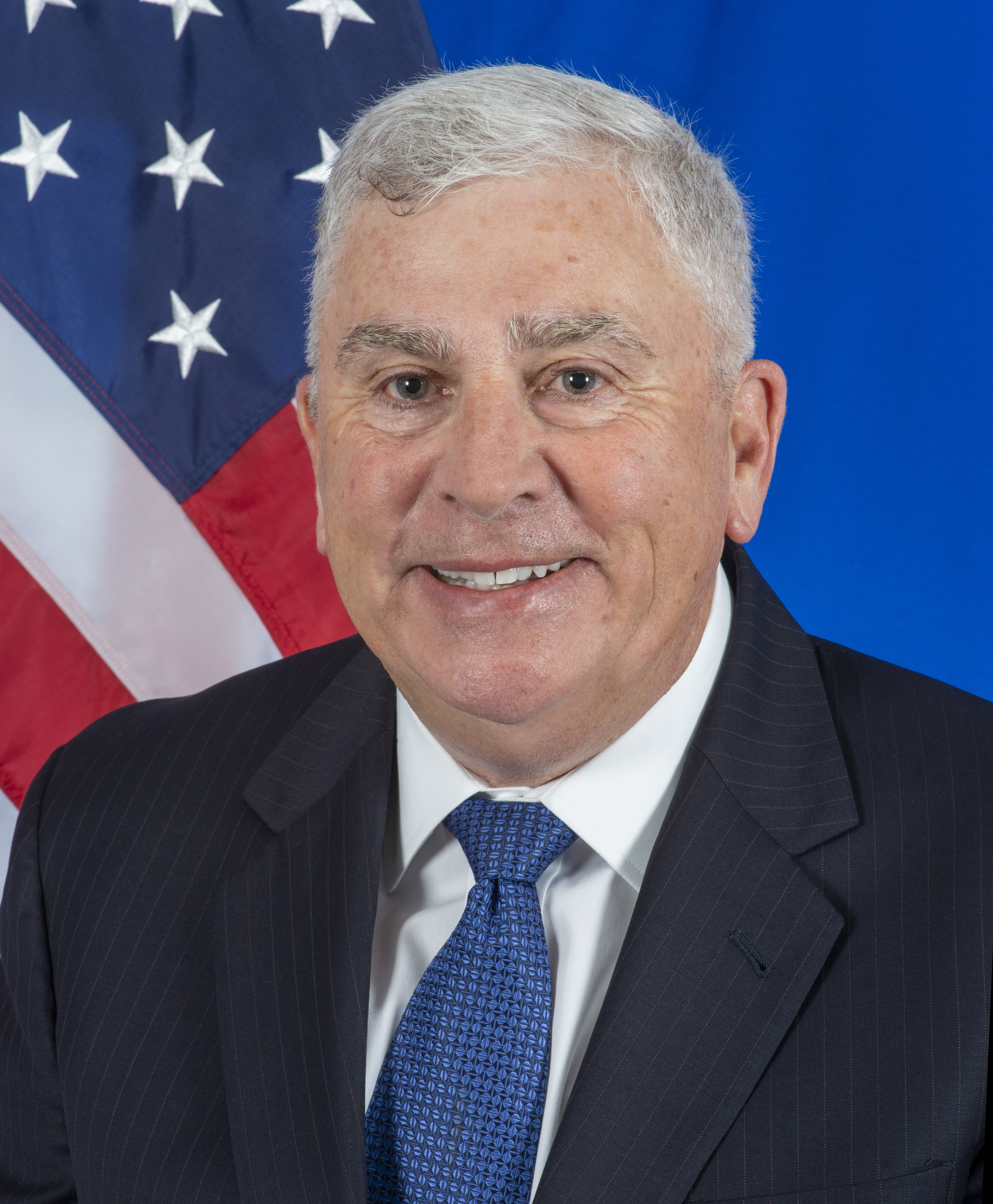
- Official portrait, 2019

United States Ambassador to Saudi Arabia
- In office 16 June 2019 – 20 January 2021
- President: Donald Trump
- Preceded by: Joseph W. Westphal
- Succeeded by: Michael Ratney

8th Commander of the United States Central Command
- In office 7 July 2003 – 16 March 2007
- President: George W. Bush
- Preceded by: Tommy Franks
- Succeeded by: William J. Fallon

Personal details
- Born: 1 April 1951 (age 75) Redwood City, California, U.S.
- Children: 3, including Christine
- Education: U.S. Military Academy (BS); Harvard University (MA)

Military service
- Allegiance: United States
- Branch: United States Army
- Years: 1973–2007
- Rank: General
- Commands: U.S. Central Command; U.S. Military Academy; 1st Infantry Division; 504th PIR; 3rd Battalion, 325th Airborne Infantry Regiment
- Wars: Grenada War; Gulf War; Bosnian War; Kosovo War; War in Afghanistan; Iraq War
- Awards: Defense Distinguished Service Medal (3); Army Distinguished Service Medal; Defense Superior Service Medal; Legion of Merit (6); Bronze Star Medal; Officer of the Order of Australia
- John Abizaid's voice Abizaid, while CENTCOM commander, speaks on the threat of Islamic extremism in the Middle East; Recorded 29 September 2005

John Philip Abizaid (born 1 April 1951) is a retired United States Army general and former United States Central Command (CENTCOM) commander who served as the United States Ambassador to Saudi Arabia from 2019 to 2021.

In 2007, Abizaid retired after 34 years of service. As of 2007, Abizaid is employed as a fellow of the Hoover Institution at Stanford University. He assumed the Distinguished Chair of the Combating Terrorism Center at West Point in December 2007. Abizaid was appointed to the board of directors of RPM International on 24 January 2008, and also sits on the board of directors of the Defense Ventures Group. In 2008, he was selected as a Montgomery Fellow at Dartmouth College.

On 13 November 2018, he was nominated as the United States Ambassador to Saudi Arabia. He was confirmed by the United States Senate as ambassador on 10 April 2019, and sworn in on 30 April 2019. Abizaid formally presented his credentials to King Salman on 16 June 2019. He resigned on 20 January 2021. He now serves as senior advisor at Albright Stonebridge Group.

== Early life and education ==
Abizaid was born in Redwood City, California, to a family of Lebanese Maronite Catholics; his grandparents had immigrated from Lebanon in the 19th century. He was raised in Coleville, California, where he graduated from high school in 1969. His father, who served in the United States Navy as a machinist during World War II, raised him after Abizaid's mother died of cancer.

Abizaid's military education includes the United States Military Academy (USMA) at West Point, New York (Class of 1973); Infantry Officer Basic and Advanced courses, Armed Forces Staff College, and a U.S. Army War College Senior Fellowship at the Hoover Institution, Stanford University.

In his civilian studies, he earned a Master of Arts degree in Middle Eastern studies at Harvard University, and was an Olmsted Scholar at the University of Jordan in Amman, Jordan. Abizaid greatly impressed his teachers at Harvard University. Nadav Safran, the director of the Harvard Center for Middle Eastern Studies kept Abizaid's 100-page paper on defense policy for Saudi Arabia, the only paper of a master's student he has kept, saying, "It was absolutely the best seminar paper I ever got in my 30-plus years at Harvard."

== Career ==
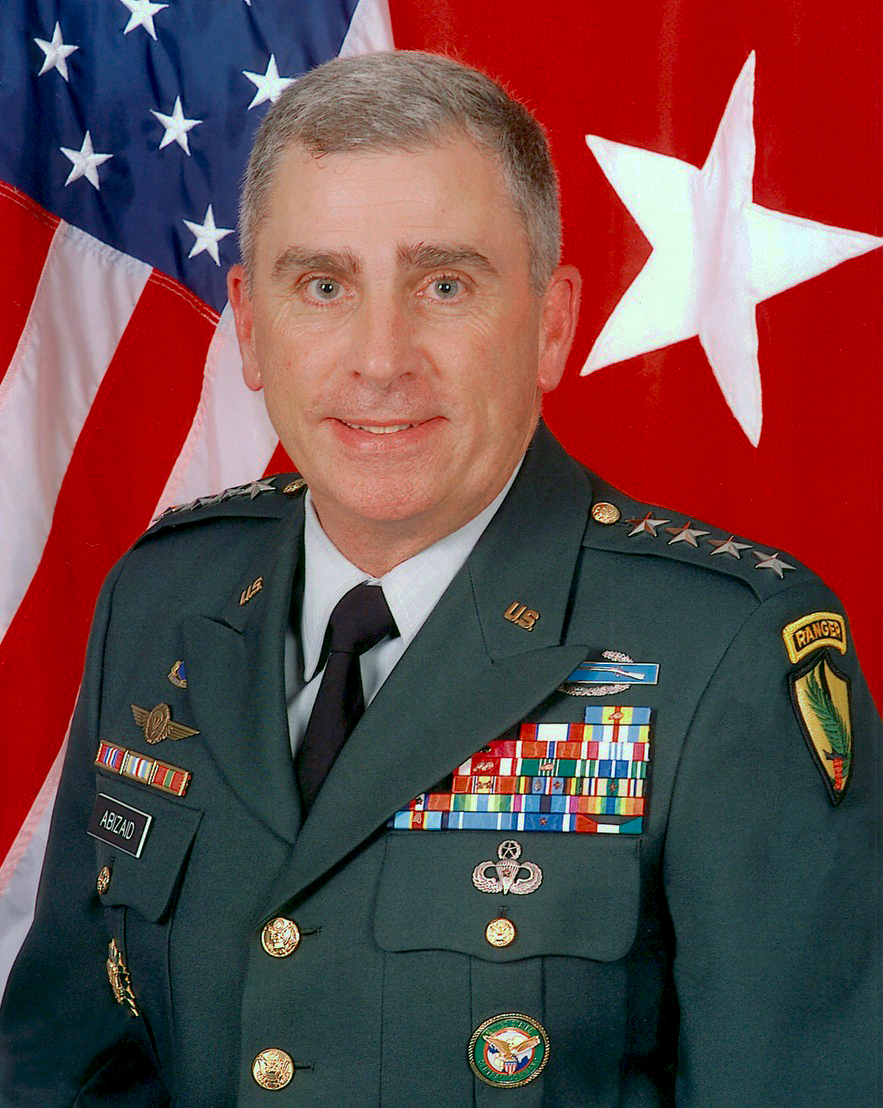
Abizaid in 2003

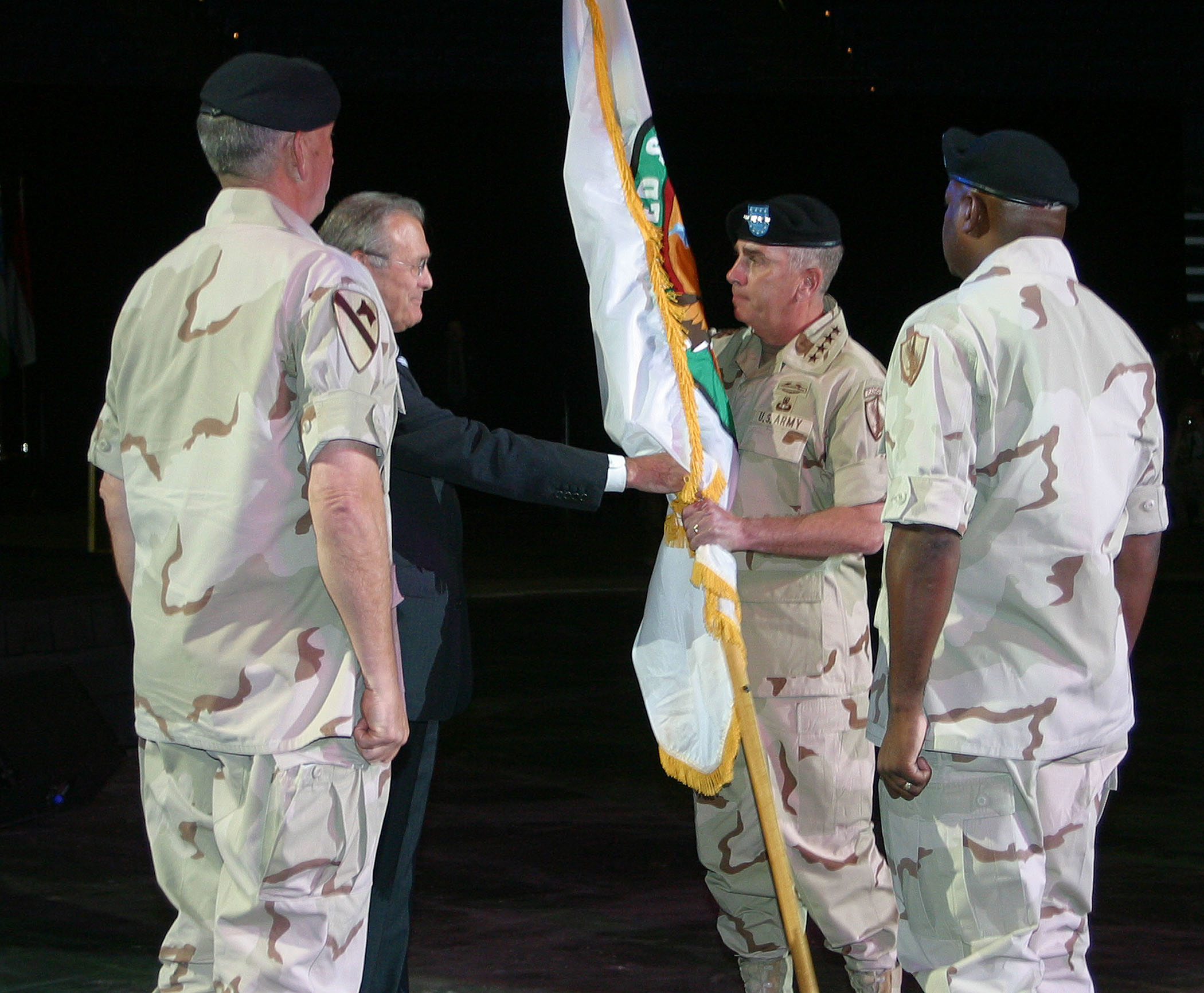
General Abizaid accepts the CENTCOM command guidon from Defense Secretary Donald Rumsfeld on 7 July 2003.

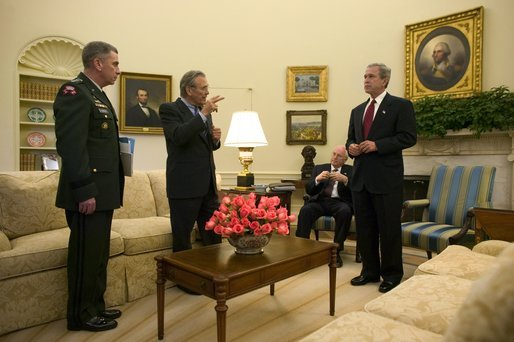
Abizaid with President George W. Bush, Vice President Dick Cheney, and Defense Secretary Donald Rumsfeld in the Oval Office in May 2004

Abizaid was commissioned a second lieutenant of infantry upon graduation from the United States Military Academy at West Point, New York, Class of June 1973. He started his career with the 504th Parachute Infantry Regiment, 82nd Airborne Division at Fort Bragg, North Carolina, where he served as a rifle and scout platoon leader. He commanded companies in the 2nd and 1st Ranger Battalions, leading a Ranger Rifle Company during the invasion of Grenada. In 1983, he jumped from an MC-130 onto a landing strip in Grenada and ordered one of his Rangers to drive a bulldozer like a tank toward Cuban troops as he advanced behind it—a move highlighted in the 1986 Clint Eastwood film, Heartbreak Ridge.

Abizaid commanded the 3rd Battalion, 325th Airborne Regiment combat Team in Vicenza, Italy, during the Persian Gulf War and deployed with the battalion in Northern Iraq to provide a safe haven for the Kurds.

His brigade command was the 504th Parachute Infantry Regiment of the 82nd Airborne Division. He served as the Assistant Division Commander, 1st Armored Division, in Bosnia-Herzegovina. Following that tour, he served as the 66th Commandant at the United States Military Academy at West Point. At West Point, he reined in hazing rituals and revamped the curriculum. Later, he took command of the 1st Infantry Division, the "Big Red One," in Würzburg, Germany, from David L. Grange, which provided the first U.S. ground forces into Kosovo. He served as the Deputy Commander (Forward), Combined Forces Command, U.S. Central Command during Operation Iraqi Freedom.

Staff assignments include a tour with the United Nations as Operations Officer (G-3) for Observer Group Lebanon and a tour in the Office of the Chief of Staff of the U.S. Army. European staff tours include assignments in both the Southern European Task Force and Headquarters, U.S. Army Europe. Abizaid also served as Executive Assistant to the Chairman of the Joint Chiefs of Staff, Director of Strategic Plans and Policy (J-5) on the Joint Staff and Director of the Joint Staff.

Following the Iraq War and the overthrow of Saddam Hussein, Abizaid assumed command of Central Command from General Tommy Franks. He was under consideration to become the chief of staff of the Army in 2003, but declined the appointment.

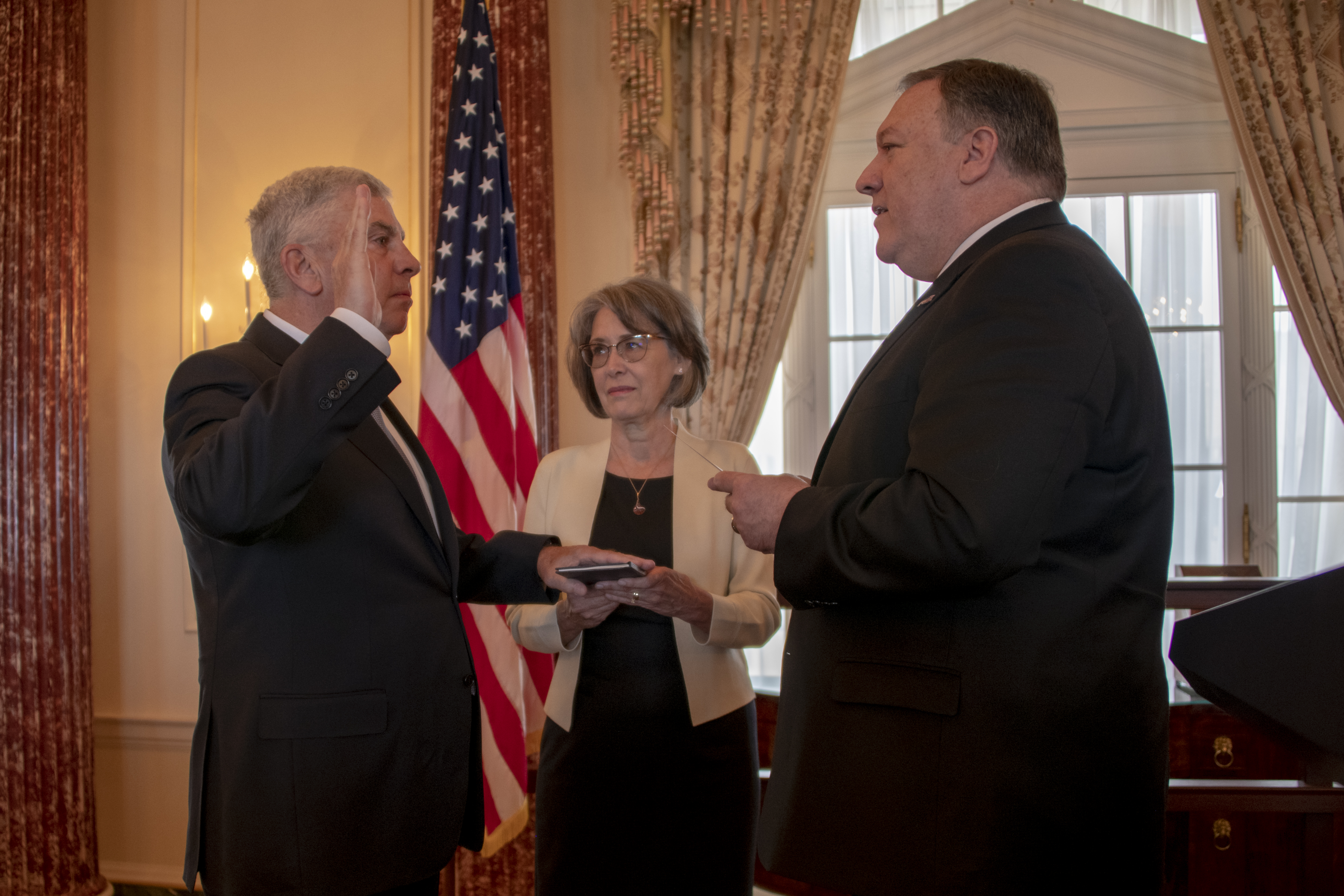
Abizaid is sworn in as the United States Ambassador to Saudi Arabia by Secretary of State Mike Pompeo in 2019

On 20 December 2006, it was announced that Abizaid would step down from his position and retire in March 2007. He had planned to retire earlier, but stayed at the urging of Donald Rumsfeld. On 16 March 2007, Abizaid transferred command to Admiral William J. Fallon, after serving longer as commander of U.S. Central Command than any of his predecessors.

On 8 September 2016, Abizaid was appointed advisor to Ukrainian Defense Minister Stepan Poltorak by Secretary of Defense Ash Carter.

On 13 November 2018, he was nominated as the U.S. Ambassador to Saudi Arabia. He was confirmed by the United States Senate as ambassador on 10 April 2019, and sworn in on 30 April 2019. Abizaid formally presented his credentials to King Salman on 16 June 2019.

== Personal life ==
Abizaid is married and has three children, including Christine Abizaid. He learned Arabic in the military.

=== Global War on Terrorism speech ===
In November 2005, Abizaid gave a speech on the Global War on Terrorism at the Naval War College.

=== 2006–2007 comments on Iraq ===
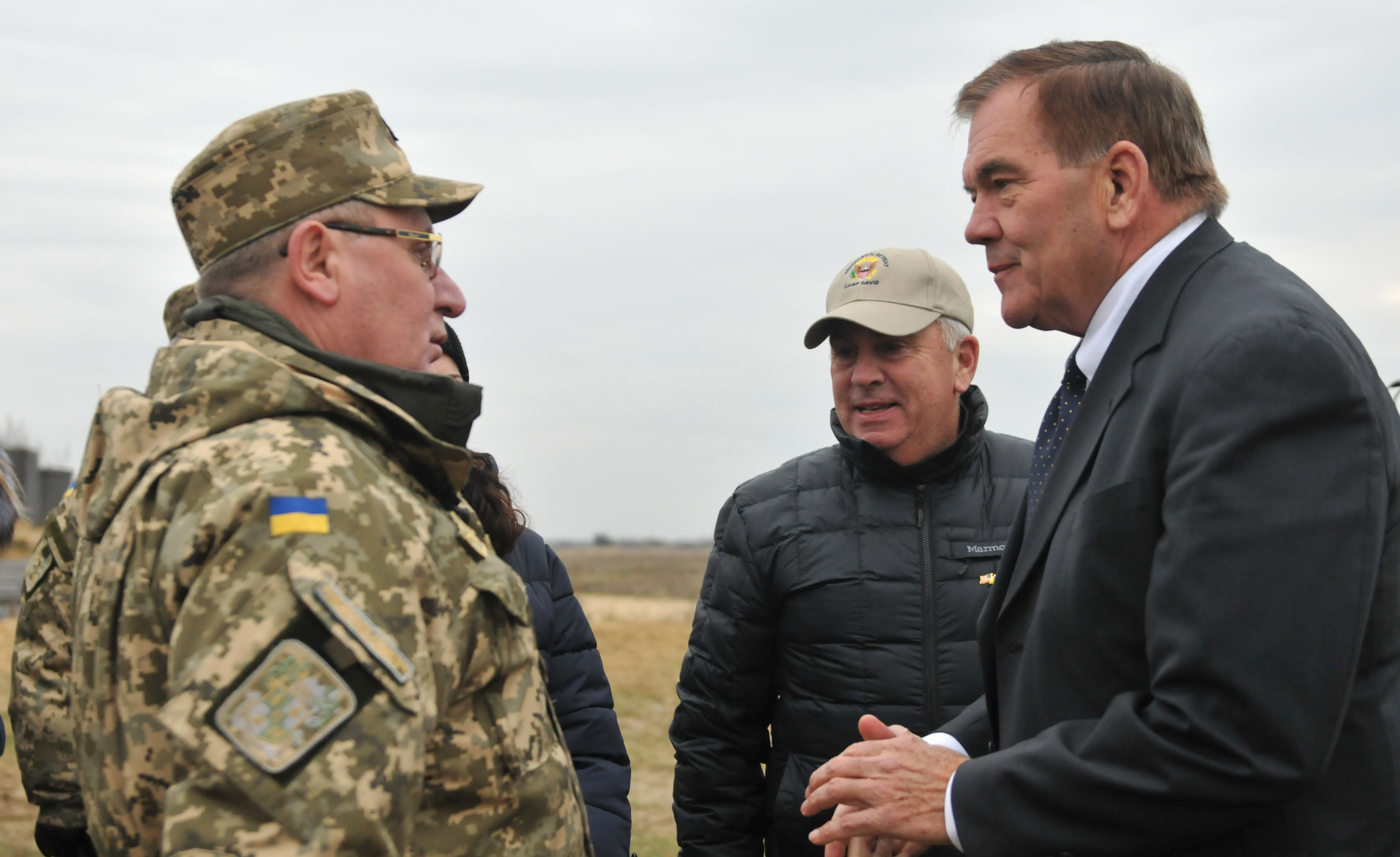
Abizaid and Tom Ridge speak with Pavel Tkachuk in 2016

On 3 August 2006, Abizaid, in testimony before the Senate Armed Services Committee, said the following about the situation on the ground in Iraq: "I believe that the sectarian violence is probably as bad as I've seen it, in Baghdad in particular, and that if not stopped, it is possible that Iraq could move towards civil war." He also testified, "I'm optimistic that that slide [toward civil war] can be prevented".

=== Bob Woodward on Abizaid and Murtha ===
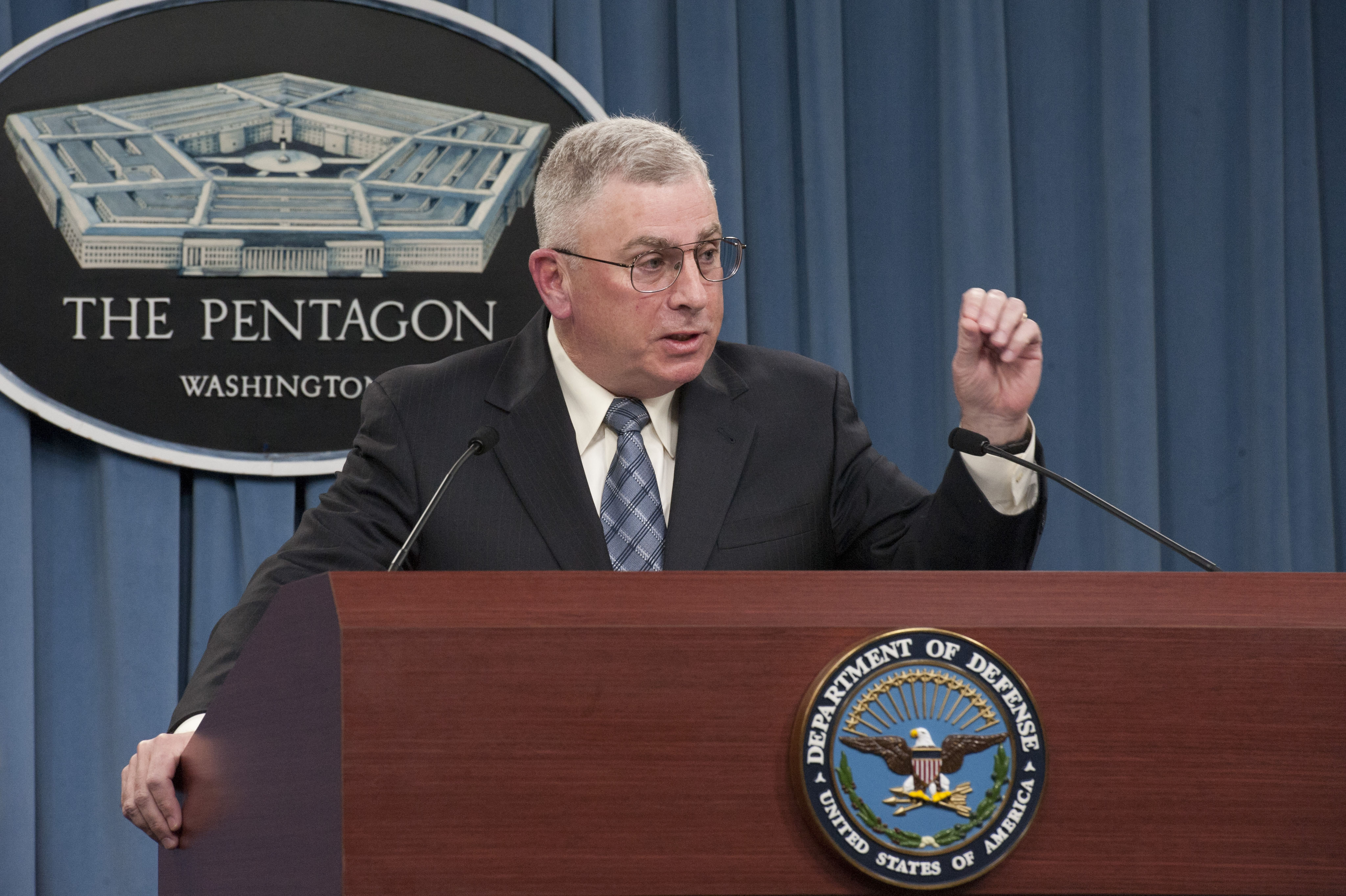
Abizaid briefs the press on the findings of the Dover Port Mortuary Independent Review in the Pentagon in 2012

In State of Denial: Bush at War, Part III (as excerpted in Newsweek magazine), Bob Woodward of The Washington Post wrote that on 16 March 2006, Abizaid was in Washington to testify before the Senate Armed Services Committee. "He painted a careful but upbeat picture of the situation in Iraq." Subsequently, "he went over to see Congressman John Murtha (D-Pa), the 73-year old veteran Marine who had introduced a resolution the previous November calling for the redeployment of troops from Iraq as soon as practicable." Abizaid said he wanted to speak frankly, and "according to Murtha, Abizaid raised his hand for emphasis and held his thumb and forefinger a quarter of an inch from each other and said, "We're that far apart."

On 1 October 2006, an interview of Woodward by CBS reporter Mike Wallace was broadcast on the television show 60 Minutes. Wallace mentioned the Murtha-Abizaid conversation. Wallace asked Woodward to confirm that Murtha had told him of this tale of meeting with Abizaid; Woodward nodded his head in assent and said yes.

=== Iran's nuclear program ===
In remarks at the Center for Strategic and International Studies reported on 17 September 2007, Abizaid stated, "We need to press the international community as hard as we possibly can, and the Iranians, to cease and desist on the development of a nuclear weapon and we should not preclude any option that we may have to deal with it." He also said, "I believe that we have the power to deter Iran, should it become nuclear."

"There are ways to live with a nuclear Iran," Abizaid said, "Let's face it, we lived with a nuclear Soviet Union, we've lived with a nuclear China, and we're living with (other) nuclear powers as well."

== Awards and decorations ==
Abizaid has been decorated for service, to include:

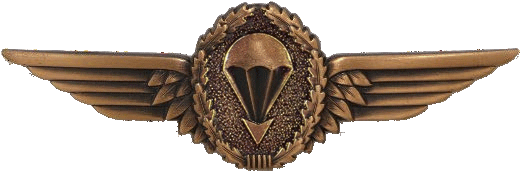

Badge	Combat Infantryman Badge			
Badge	Master Parachutist Badge with 1 combat jump star			
Badge	German Parachutist Badge (bronze)			
1st row	Defense Distinguished Service Medal with 2 bronze Oak leaf clusters		Distinguished Service Medal	
2nd row	Defense Superior Service Medal	Legion of Merit with 1 silver Oak leaf cluster	Bronze Star	Defense Meritorious Service Medal
3rd row	Meritorious Service Medal with 3 bronze Oak leaf clusters	Army Commendation Medal with 2 bronze Oak leaf clusters	Army Achievement Medal	National Defense Service Medal with 2 bronze Service stars
4th row	Armed Forces Expeditionary Medal with Arrowhead Device and 1 bronze Campaign star	Southwest Asia Service Medal with 1 bronze Campaign star	Kosovo Campaign Medal with 1 bronze Campaign star	Armed Forces Service Medal
5th row	Humanitarian Service Medal	Army Service Ribbon	Army Overseas Service Ribbon	United Nations Medal for UNTSO
6th row	NATO Medal for ex-Yugoslavia	Order of Australia (Military Division)	German Bundeswehr Cross of Honour in gold	Kuwait Liberation Medal (Kuwait)
Badges	Ranger Tab		75th Ranger Regiment; Combat Service Identification Badge	
Badges	Joint Chiefs of Staff Identification Badge		United States Army Staff Identification Badge	
Unit awards	Joint Meritorious Unit Award		Valorous Unit Award	Superior Unit Award

=== International decorations ===
- Honorary Officer of the Order of Australia
- Gold Cross of Honour of the Bundeswehr (Ehrenkreuz der Bundeswehr in Gold)

Military offices
Preceded by Tommy Franks	Commander of the United States Central Command; 2003–2007	Succeeded by William J. Fallon
Diplomatic posts
Preceded by Joseph W. Westphal	United States Ambassador to Saudi Arabia; 2019–2021	Succeeded by Michael Ratney
