= National Counterterrorism Center =

U.S. government organization responsible for counterterrorism efforts

Coordinates: 38.933°N 77.205°W

Agency overview
- Formed: 2004
- Preceding agency: Terrorist Threat Integration Center (establ. 2004)
- Headquarters: McLean, Virginia, U.S.
- Agency executives: Joe Weirsky, Acting Director; Joe Weirsky, Deputy Director; Brendan Ryan, Executive Director
- Parent agency: Office of the Director of National Intelligence
- Website: NCTC.gov

The National Counterterrorism Center (NCTC) is a United States government organization responsible for national and international counterterrorism efforts. It is based at Liberty Crossing in McLean, Virginia. The NCTC advises the United States on terrorism.

Part of the Office of the Director of National Intelligence, the center brings together specialists from other federal agencies, including the CIA, the FBI, the Department of Defense, and the Department of Homeland Security.

== History ==
The idea of a center to merge intelligence on terror threats was proposed by the 9/11 Commission following the completion of its investigation into the September 11 attacks, the deadliest terrorist attack in world history. Plans to create such a center were announced by President George W. Bush in his January 2003 State of the Union address. On May 1, 2003, Executive Order 13354 established the Terrorist Threat Integration Center (TTIC).

In 2004, the center was renamed the NCTC and placed under the director of national intelligence by the Intelligence Reform and Terrorism Prevention Act.

After the Christmas 2009 terrorist attempt on Northwest Airlines Flight 253, the NCTC was tasked with creating a process to "thoroughly and exhaustively" prioritize terrorism threat threads; identify follow-up action by intelligence, law enforcement, and homeland security; and enhance the "Terrorist Identities Datamart Environment" database, to add names to watchlists.

In 2012, United States attorney general Eric Holder granted the NCTC the authority to collect, store, and analyze extensive data collections on U.S. citizens compiled from governmental and non-governmental sources for suspicious behavior through pattern analysis and to share the databases with foreign states. The effort has drawn controversy for its pre-crime effort, which has been likened to the Information Awareness Office and its proposed mass surveillance.

In August 2019, The Daily Beast reported that the NCTC had begun to work on counterintelligence to combat domestic terrorism.

== Activities ==
The center analyzes terrorism intelligence including potential domestic threat intelligence; monitors communications internationally and domestically for potential threats; generates actionable information to potentially prevent criminal acts domestically; stores terrorism information; supports U.S. counterterrorism activities using information technology (IT); and plans counter-terrorism activities as directed by the president of the United States, the National Security Council, and the Homeland Security Council.

It provides terrorism information to the intelligence community; makes detailed lists of terrorists, terrorist groups, and worldwide terrorist incidents; supports the response to terrorist incidents in the United States and worldwide; and writes assessments and briefings for policymakers.

The NCTC has access to various databases, including those from the NSA and the CIA, and is in charge of the Terrorist Identities Datamart Environment (TIDE) database. It also operates the publicly accessible Worldwide Incidents Tracking System database.

The NCTC's Terrorist Identities Datamart Environment (TIDE) database contains more than 1.2 million identities of people who are known to be terrorists, suspected of it, or linked to people who are.

== Leaders ==
=== Directors ===
No.	Image	Director	Term start	Term end	Appointed by
(Acting)		John O. Brennan	August 27, 2004	August 1, 2005	George W. Bush
1		John Scott Redd	August 1, 2005	November 10, 2007	George W. Bush
(Acting)		Michael E. Leiter	November 10, 2007	June 12, 2008	George W. Bush
2		Michael E. Leiter	June 12, 2008	July 8, 2011	George W. Bush
3		Matthew G. Olsen	August 16, 2011	July 9, 2014	Barack Obama
4		Nicholas Rasmussen	December 18, 2014	December 24, 2017	Barack Obama
(Acting)		Russell Travers	December 24, 2017	December 27, 2018	Donald Trump
5		Joseph Maguire	December 27, 2018	August 15, 2019	Donald Trump
(Acting)		Russell Travers	August 16, 2019	March 18, 2020	Donald Trump
(Acting)		Lora Shiao	April 3, 2020	August 10, 2020	Donald Trump
6		Christopher C. Miller	August 10, 2020	November 9, 2020	Donald Trump
(Acting)	-	Steve Vanech	November 10, 2020	June 29, 2021	Donald Trump
7		Christine Abizaid	June 29, 2021	July 5, 2024	Joe Biden
(Acting)		Brett M. Holmgren	July 5, 2024	January 20, 2025	Joe Biden
(Acting)		Don Holstead	January 20, 2025	May 9, 2025	Donald Trump
8		Joe Kent	July 31, 2025	March 17, 2026	Donald Trump
(Acting)		Joe Weirsky	March 17, 2026	Present	Donald Trump

=== Deputy directors ===
- Arthur M. Cummings (2004–05)
- Kevin R. Brock (2005–07)
- Michael E. Leiter (2007–08)
- Geoff O'Connell (2008–2011)
- Andrew Liepman (2011–2012)
- Nicholas J. Rasmussen (2012–2014)
- L. Joseph Camilleri (2016–2017)
- John J. Mulligan
- Lora Shiao (April 3, 2020 – October 2020)
- Steve Vanech (November 10, 2020 – March 2024)
- Don Holstead (March 2024 – May 9, 2025)
- Kelton Jago (May 2025 – October 2025)
- Joseph Weirsky (October 2025 – Present)

== See also ==
- Director of Central Intelligence Directive
- Counterterrorism Center
- Information Sharing Environment
- Disposition Matrix
- Joint Terrorism Analysis Centre – a similar body in the UK
