= GridPoint =

American energy management company

- Founded: 2003
- Headquarters: Reston, Virginia; Roanoke, Virginia
- Products: Energy management systems Energy management software Software-as-a-Service; Utility load and storage management software Utility customer engagement platforms
- Website: www.gridpoint.com

GridPoint is an American clean technology company based in Reston, Virginia, that provides energy management and sustainability services to enterprises and government agencies, such as electric utilities.

GridPoint services include building management systems, equipment-level submetering and monitoring hardware, software analytics, and related energy management services.

== History and growth ==
GridPoint was founded in 2003 by Peter L. Corsell. Through its early growth and into 2009, GridPoint's Smart Grid Platform provided an intelligent network for utilities to integrate load measurement and control devices, energy storage technologies, and renewable energy sources into the electric grid.

In 2009, the company began utilising the data and analytics research and knowledge from its utility-facing smart grid technologies to develop tools to assist large energy consumers, particularly in the enterprise and government sectors, in managing their energy consumption.

Later that year, GridPoint acquired ADMMicro, a developer of energy management systems for the commercial and industrial (C&I) sector and Lixar, a cloud-based energy management software technology company.

In 2013, former Berkshire Hathaway executive Todd Raba joined GridPoint as CEO. Raba had previously run the Berkshire Hathaway companies Johns Manville and MidAmerican Energy Company.

In 2016, Mark Danzenbaker became GridPoint's CEO. he had been with GridPoint since 2009.

In 2018, GridPoint partnered with Shell and Sparkfund to launch a new smart building subscription solution for commercial businesses.

In October 2019, GridPoint announced an investment by Hannon Armstrong which allows the company to offer its energy management platform as an all-inclusive service, requiring zero capital down with a monthly pricing structure.

GridPoint has raised over funds from investors including Goldman Sachs, Shell, Fortress Investment Group, New Enterprise Associates, I Squared Capital, QVT Financial, TOMS Capital, Twenty First Century Utilities, and Kensington Capital Partners.

== Technologies and services ==
GridPoint offers hardware and software services that collect data about equipment-level energy consumption and building environmental conditions. They also aggregate and analyze data and communicate what actions can be taken to reduce energy consumption and carbon emissions, improve operational efficiency and capital utilization, and help ensure business continuity.

=== Energy management hardware ===
GridPoint offers controllers to manage lighting schedules and HVAC (heating, ventilation and air conditioning) temperature setpoints across a network of facilities. Equipment-level submeters measure circuit-level power consumption for equipment such as individual HVAC units, chiller boiler systems, lighting, refrigeration, kitchen equipment, plug loads and signage and monitoring devices collect environmental data such as temperature, humidity and CO_{2} levels. Captured data is then fed into the GridPoint Energy Manager software platform.

=== Energy management software ===
GridPoint offers an energy management software platform called GridPoint Energy Manager. It is a cloud-based data aggregation and analytics service that presents equipment-level energy consumption and building environmental information through SaaS-based dashboards, reports and alarms. The software platform can be accessed using either GridPoint or third-party hardware. The software platform also includes demand response functionality and distributed energy resources integration.

== Company reception ==
GridPoint was designated as a 2008 Technology Pioneer by the World Economic Forum.

GridPoint's institutional investors include Goldman Sachs and New Enterprise Associates (NEA).

== See also ==
- Plugless Power
