= Nicholas Rasmussen =

Director of the National Counterterrorism Center

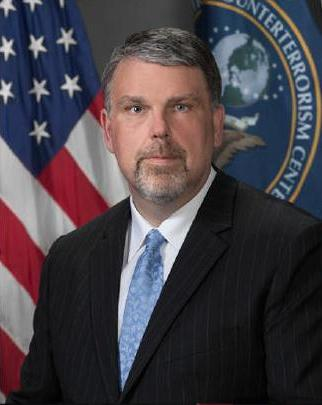

4th Director of the National Counterterrorism Center
- In office December 18, 2014 – December 24, 2017
- President: Barack Obama; Donald Trump
- Preceded by: Matthew G. Olsen
- Succeeded by: Joseph Maguire

Personal details
- Education: Wesleyan University (BA); Princeton University (MPA)

Nicholas J. Rasmussen is the former director of the National Counterterrorism Center (NCTC), a United States government organization. He was sworn in on December 18, 2014 and was replaced by Russell Travers on December 24, 2017.

== Biography ==
Rasmussen received a B.A. degree with high honors from the College of Social Studies at Wesleyan University and was awarded a master in public and international affairs from the Woodrow Wilson School at Princeton University. He joined the Department of State in 1991 as a presidential management intern in the Bureau of Political-Military Affairs and for more than a decade served in a variety of key positions. He worked as a foreign affairs analyst in the Bureau of Political-Military Affairs from 1991 to 1994 focusing on Persian Gulf security issues following Operation Desert Storm, including negotiations for U.S. forces' access and basing in Bahrain, Kuwait, Qatar, the United Arab Emirates, and Saudi Arabia. From 1994 to 1996 he was a special assistant to Ambassador-at-Large Robert Gallucci, providing analysis of the negotiation and implementation of the U.S.-North Korea Agreed Framework. Rasmussen was special assistant to the State Department's special Middle East coordinator, Ambassador Dennis Ross, from 1996 to 2001, providing support to the Arab-Israeli peace process.

From 2001 to 2004, he served on the NSC staff as director for regional affairs in the Office of Combating Terrorism where he focused on Middle East, Southeast Asia, and related counterterrorism issues in the period after September 11, 2001. From 2004 to 2007, Rasmussen served at the NCTC in senior policy and planning positions responsible for producing net assessments of U.S. counterterrorism policy and strategy for the U.S. National Security Council (NSC) and the president.

He served beginning in October 2007 with the National Security Council staff as special assistant to the president and senior director for counterterrorism, where he was responsible for providing staff support to the president, the national security advisor and homeland security advisor on counterterrorism policy and strategy.

Rasmussen served as deputy director of the National Counterterrorism Center (NCTC) starting in June 2012 and was sworn in as its director on December 18, 2014, upon his confirmation by the United States Senate. The New York Times reported on November 15, 2017, that Rasmussen would step down as director in December 2017 and had "not decided what to do next."

In October 2020, Rasmussen signed an open letter stating that the Hunter Biden laptop story had "all the classic earmarks of a Russian information operation". In January 2025, his security clearance was revoked by President Donald Trump. He is the recipient of numerous awards, including the National Intelligence Distinguished Service Medal in 2017, the Distinguished Presidential Rank Award in 2016, an International Affairs Fellowship from the Council on Foreign Relations, and has taught a course on U.S. counterterrorism policy at Georgetown University's School of Foreign Service.
