= Plugless Power =

- Product type: Electric Vehicle infrastructure
- Current owner: Plugless Power, Inc.
- Country: United States
- Introduced: 2011
- Markets: United States
- Website: pluglesspower.com

Plugless Power is a family of Electric Vehicle Supply Equipment (EVSE) products manufactured by Plugless Power, Inc. that enable wireless (inductive) charging for electric vehicles (WCEV). The Plugless Power EVSE wirelessly delivers electrical power to the on-board EV battery charger using electromagnetic induction without a physical connection (cable) to the vehicle. An EV equipped with a Plugless Vehicle Adapter can be charged by parking it over an inductive Plugless Parking Pad. The active step of plugging a cord into the vehicle is eliminated.

== History and development ==
Plugless Power, Inc.
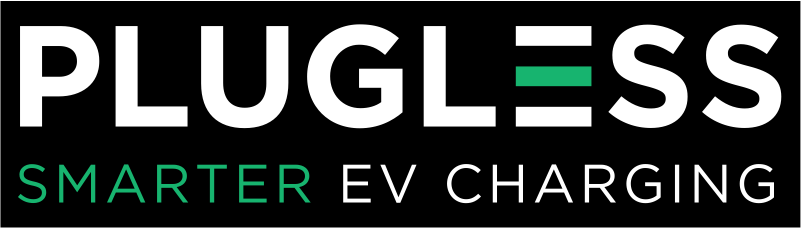
- Type: Privately held company
- Industry: Electric vehicle infrastructure
- Founded: April 2009
- Headquarters: Houston, Texas, Houston, Texas, United States
- Area served: Worldwide
- Key people: Michael Rai Anderson (Co-Founder and Chairman); Tom Hough (Co-Founder, Board Member); Robert Gaidousek (Co-Founder, Board Member)
- Products: Inductive charging system
- Website: http://plugless.com/

In 2009, Evatran began development of Plugless Power, an inductive charging system for charging Electric Vehicles without plugging in. Field trials were begun in March 2010. The first system was sold to Google in 2011 for employee use at the Mountain View campus. Evatran began selling the Plugless L2 Wireless charging system to the public in 2014.

In simple terms, inductive charging works by separating the two halves of an electric transformer with an air gap – one half, the Plugless Power Vehicle Adapter, is installed on the vehicle and the other half, the Plugless Power Parking Pad, is installed on the floor of a garage or in a parking lot. When a car with an Adapter drives over a Pad, the two pieces are brought into close proximity, 70–300 mm (2.8–11.8 in), then current from the electrical grid flows through the coils in the Power Pad to create magnetic fields and these fields induce current flow in the Vehicle Adapter's coils to charge the battery.

Idaho National Laboratory (INL) testing in 2013 found the system had a power delivery efficiency between 84%-90%, compared to 95%-99% for corded charging systems.

In 2014, Popular Science included the Plugless L2 charging system as Best of What's New 2014.

As of October 2016, the Plugless L2 was being sold for use with the Nissan LEAF, Chevrolet Volt, Cadillac ELR and Tesla Model S. In 2020, support for BMW i3 had been added, while the original plans were much more ambitious: targeting 80% of EVs by 2017.

== Manufacturer ==
Founded in 2009, Evatran was formed as a clean technology subsidiary of MTC Transformers, an award-winning American manufacturer of high-quality, precision-engineered transformers and rewind services based in Wytheville, Virginia.

== See also ==
- Charging station
- GridPoint
- Inductive charging
- OpenEVSE
- Vehicle-to-grid
