= Don Holstead =

Acting Director of the National Counterterrorism Center
- In office January 20, 2025 – May 9, 2025
- President: Donald Trump
- Preceded by: Brett M. Holmgren (acting)
- Succeeded by: Joe Kent

Deputy Director of the National Counterterrorism Center
- In office March 2024 – May 9, 2025
- President: Donald Trump
- Preceded by: Steve Vanech
- Succeeded by: Kelton Jago

Personal details
- Born: Donald Holstead
- Education: Georgetown University

Military service
- Allegiance: United States
- Branch/service: United States Army

Donald Holstead is an American public servant and assistant director of the FBI's Counterterrorism Division.

== Career ==
Holstead was acting director of the Counterterrorism Division from January to May 2025.

In June 2025, Holstead issued orders to return certain FBI personnel back to counterterrorism portfolios after many were reassigned to support immigration and deportation efforts.
