= Russell Travers =

American government official

Russell E. Travers
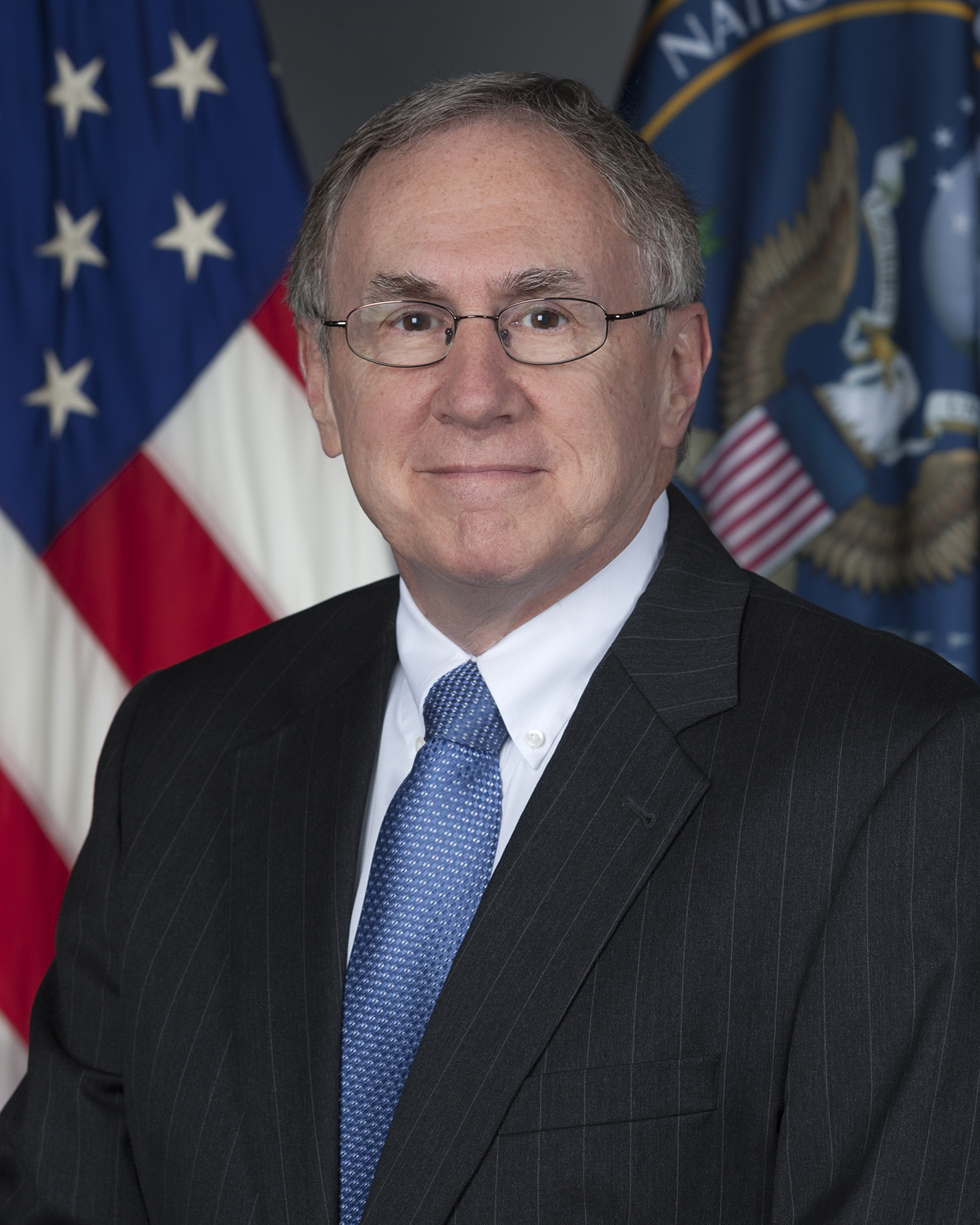

Acting Director of the National Counterterrorism Center
- In office August 16, 2019 – March 18, 2020
- Preceded by: Joseph Maguire
- Succeeded by: Lora Shiao (acting)
- In office December 24, 2017 – December 27, 2018
- Preceded by: Nicholas Rasmussen
- Succeeded by: Joseph Maguire

Personal details
- Education: College of William & Mary (BA); George Washington University (MBA, JD)

Russell E. Travers is an American national security official who served as the deputy director of the National Counterterrorism Center (NCTC). Travers first took the role on November 13, 2017, and later became acting director. He resumed his duties as deputy on December 28, 2018, following Joseph Maguire's swearing in as NCTC director. Travers again became acting director on August 16, 2019, after Maguire became Acting Director of National Intelligence. He was dismissed on March 18, 2020.

== Education ==
Travers earned a Bachelor of Arts degree in Government and Economics from the College of William & Mary. He earned a Master in Business Administration and a Juris Doctor from the George Washington University School of Business and George Washington University Law School. He has received numerous awards, including the Meritorious Executive Presidential Rank Award.

== Career ==
He has also served as deputy director for policy support at the Defense Intelligence Agency; the defense intelligence officer for General Purpose Forces; the senior civilian advisor to the Director for Intelligence, J2, Joint Chiefs of Staff, and the defense intelligence liaison to British Intelligence in London. He began his career as an intelligence officer in the United States Army in 1978.

He has served in a number of other leadership positions within NCTC, including senior counselor to the director, acting director of the Office of Data Strategy and Innovation, and the chief data officer for both NCTC and ODNI.

Between 2013 and 2015, Travers served as the special assistant to the president and senior director for transnational threat integration and information sharing on the United States National Security Council. He focused on government-wide improvements in border security and information sharing and applying lessons learned from U.S. government counterterrorism efforts to other transnational threats. Prior to this assignment, he served as the National Intelligence Council's senior executive for transnational organized crime from 2011 to 2013, where he organized intelligence community analytic support to the National Strategy to Combat Transnational Organized Crime.

Travers served on the leadership team that stood up the Terrorist Threat Integration Center and the NCTC. From 2003 to 2010, he was deputy director for information sharing and knowledge development, during which time he focused on post-9/11 improvements. Travers oversaw the development of the Terrorist Identities Datamart Environment, NCTC's database of known and suspected terrorists, as well as improvements in watchlisting, information sharing, and advanced analytic techniques.

In October 2020, Travers signed a letter stating the Biden laptop story “has the classic earmarks of a Russian information operation
