= Peter Corsell =

American technology entrepreneur and investor

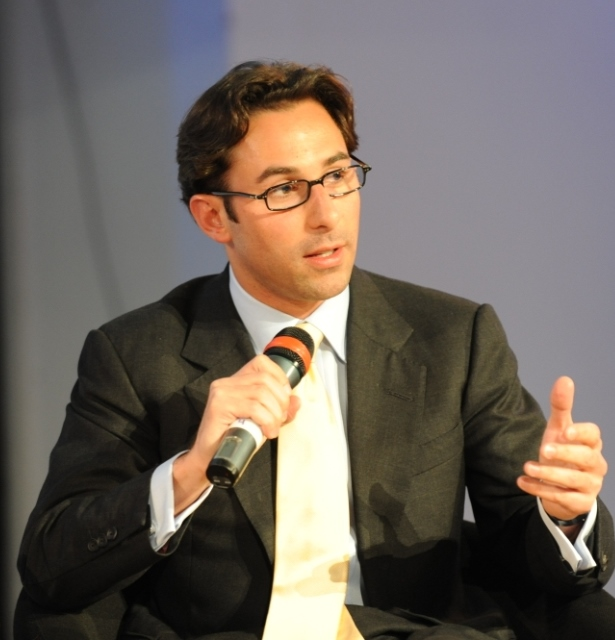
- Corsell at the Bloomberg New Energy Finance Summit
- Born: December 5, 1977 (age 48); Brooklyn, New York, U.S.
- Education: Georgetown University
- Occupations: Founder of Twenty First Century Utilities; Founder of GridPoint

Peter L. Corsell (born December 5, 1977) is an American technology entrepreneur, leader, and investor. A repeat entrepreneur in the sustainable energy industry, Corsell founded GridPoint in 2003, and Twenty First Century Utilities in 2015.

== Early life and education ==
Corsell was born in Brooklyn and raised in Manhattan. Corsell attended the Edmund A. Walsh School of Foreign Service at Georgetown University where he earned a BSFS degree in 2000.

In 1999, Corsell was recruited by the Central Intelligence Agency, where he worked as an intelligence officer in the Cuba branch. From early 2001 to late 2002, Corsell worked for the U.S. Department of State in Cuba, where he served as Special Assistant to Ambassador Vicki J. Huddleston, the Principal Officer of the United States Interests Section in Havana.

== Career ==
=== GridPoint ===
At age 25, Corsell founded GridPoint, a clean technology company, to develop energy management, energy storage, and renewable energy technologies. GridPoint initially focused on R&D, developing a valuable portfolio of foundational intellectual property in the energy management, energy storage, and electric vehicle charging segments.

During the company's first decade, GridPoint worked with power companies to develop a smart grid technology platform to integrate distributed "behind-the-meter" load measurement and control devices, battery storage technologies, and renewable energy sources into the electric grid via an intelligent communications network.

Over the past decade, GridPoint focused primarily on the commercial buildings sector, which had become a faster adopter of the company’s technology than electric utilities. GridPoint’s enterprise customers include Walgreens, Chipotle, and the U.S. Postal Service.

During his tenure at GridPoint, Corsell raised over $200 million from Goldman Sachs and several venture capital firms, increasing the company's market value by twelve times within five years to $800 million in 2008. He was featured in several books including Hot, Flat, and Crowded by Thomas Friedman, Perfect Power by Bob Galvin and Kurt Yeager, Earth: The Sequel by Fred Krupp, The Clean Tech Revolution by Ron Pernick and Clint Wilde, and The Plot to Save the Planet: How Visionary Entrepreneurs and Corporate Titans Are Creating Real Solutions to Global Warming by Brian Dumaine.

Corsell served as the company’s CEO from 2003 until 2010, when he resigned and sold most of his shares alongside Goldman Sachs in advance of the cleantech crash. He was succeeded as CEO by longtime Berkshire Hathaway executive Todd Raba, who previously ran the MidAmerican Energy Company and is currently Chairman of the MISO board.

Five years later, in November 2015, Corsell's investment firm, Twenty First Century Utilities, acquired control of GridPoint for $62.5 million, enabling Corsell to retake control of his company. In 2018, GridPoint adopted a recurring revenue model and partnered with Shell to launch a subscription offering for commercial buildings that required no upfront capital from customers.

In 2021, 2022, and 2023, Inc. Magazine named GridPoint among the fastest-growing private companies in America. According to its website, GridPoint has reduced energy consumption in commercial buildings by 10 billion kWh, saved its customers over $1 billion in costs, and avoided 18 billion pounds of CO_{2} emissions. In February 2022, Goldman Sachs returned to the company, leading a $75 million strategic investment with additional participation from Shell.

=== Twenty First Century Utilities ===
In 2015, after a five-year absence from the energy industry, Corsell cofounded Twenty First Century Utilities ("TFC"), a private investment firm specializing in the electric power sector, with former Goldman Sachs partner, Larry Kellerman, who led the firm’s electric power investment business between 2002 and 2010. In June 2016, Corsell and Kellerman appeared on the Charlie Rose show to discuss the ways in which TFC was contributing to the clean energy industry.

In November 2015, TFC acquired control of GridPoint for $62.5 million, enabling Corsell to retake control of the company. In 2017 and 2018, TFC completed multiple power purchase agreement (PPA) restructurings and was reported to be exploring electric utility acquisitions in Hawaii, South Carolina, and Bermuda.

In July 2019, TFC entered into a strategic partnership with I Squared Capital, a global infrastructure investment firm with $50 billion of assets under management in the energy, utilities, telecom, transport, and social infrastructure sector. Until 2026, Corsell was a Partner and member of the Operating Committee at I Squared, where he created the firm’s technology investment strategy. Corsell is currently an advisor to I Squared and Venture Partner to the firm’s technology funds.

In January 2021, I Squared announced the acquisition of Atlantic Power Corporation, a leading independent power producer (IPP) with a portfolio of assets across the United States and Canada, for approximately $1 billion. Corsell served as Chairman of the Board at Atlantic Power & Utilities until 2026.

=== Other ventures ===
Corsell has been a cofounder, board member, and investor in several technology companies focused on energy technology, enterprise software, AI, and cybersecurity.

In 2011, Corsell cofounded Hubub, an online community in which users created multimedia channels containing articles, images, and videos on topics of interest. In partnership with Bell Media, Hubub developed a significant following in Canada, and was featured in a 2015 Super Bowl commercial. In 2016, Hubub was acquired by Stagwell, a $3 billion digital marketing services conglomerate founded by Mark Penn and backed by Steve Ballmer, and the company was renamed Stagwell Technologies.

In 2018, Corsell cofounded HighDegree, a cybersecurity startup focused on reducing digital advertising fraud, which was acquired by IronNet, the publicly traded cybersecurity company founded by General Keith Alexander in 2019.

In 2020, Corsell signed a letter stating that the Hunter Biden laptop has "earmarks" of an "information operation"; some later evidence was to the contrary.

In 2024, Corsell launched Saige, a boutique digital transformation agency that spun out from Stagwell's internal innovation group. Saige has since grown into a leading AI strategy and consulting firm, developing technology solutions for organizations such as the NHL and Alaska Department of Revenue. In October 2026, Saige was acquired by FormativGroup under Rockbridge Growth Equity, a private equity firm backed by Dan Gilbert.

== Awards and affiliations ==
Corsell was listed by MIT Technology Review as one of the "top 35 innovators" in the world under the age of 35 in 2008. He was given additional recognition by Infrastructure Investor.

In 2008, Corsell was named Chairman of the World Economic Forum's Global Agenda Council on Sustainable Energy.

In 2010, the World Economic Forum named Corsell a "Young Global Leader."

In 2015, the National Association of Corporate Directors (NACD) included Corsell on its inaugural list of leading directors under 40.

In 2026, Corsell was credited as a co-producer of the Broadway revival of Arthur Miller's Death of a Salesman. The production won the Tony Award for Best Revival of a Play.

Corsell currently serves on the Board of Directors at GridPoint and Viral Nation, and is also a member of the Yale School of Architecture Dean’s Council. He previously served on the boards of Saige and Claros, which were both acquired in 2026.

Author Thomas Friedman claimed the title for his 2016 book Thank You for Being Late was inspired by Corsell, who was late to a breakfast meeting with Friedman in 2015.
