= Ellen E. McCarthy =

American intelligence officer

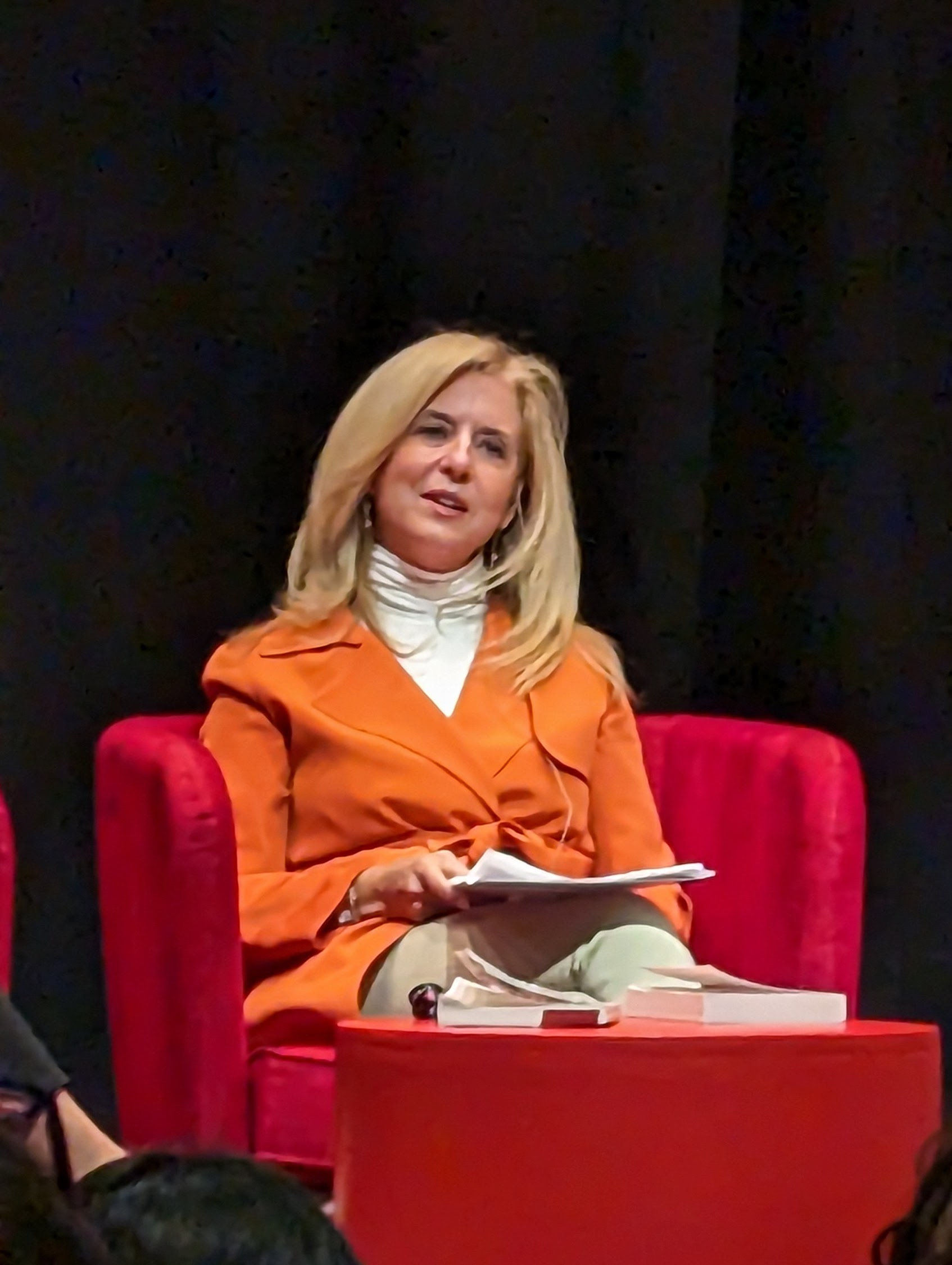
- McCarthy at the International Spy Museum in 2023

20th Assistant Secretary of State for Intelligence and Research
- In office January 22, 2019 – January 20, 2021
- President: Donald Trump
- Preceded by: Daniel B. Smith
- Succeeded by: Brett M. Holmgren

Personal details
- Education: University of South Carolina; University of Maryland
- Occupation: Diplomat

Ellen E. McCarthy is a United States intelligence officer who served as the Assistant Secretary of State for Intelligence and Research under Mike Pompeo during the administration of Donald Trump.

At the National Geospatial-Intelligence Agency, McCarthy was COO from 2015 until 2018. She graduated from both the University of South Carolina and the University of Maryland.
