= Gerstell, West Virginia =

Unincorporated community in West Virginia, United States

Gerstell
- Unincorporated community
- Location within the state of West Virginia Gerstell (the United States)
- Coordinates: 39°29′00″N 78°55′58″W
- Country: United States
- State: West Virginia
- County: Mineral
- Elevation: 742 ft (226 m)
- Time zone: UTC-5 (Eastern (EST))
  - Summer (DST): UTC-4 (EDT)
- GNIS feature ID: 1554549

Gerstell is an unincorporated community located in Mineral County, West Virginia, United States.
