= William J. Fallon =

US Navy admiral (born 1944)

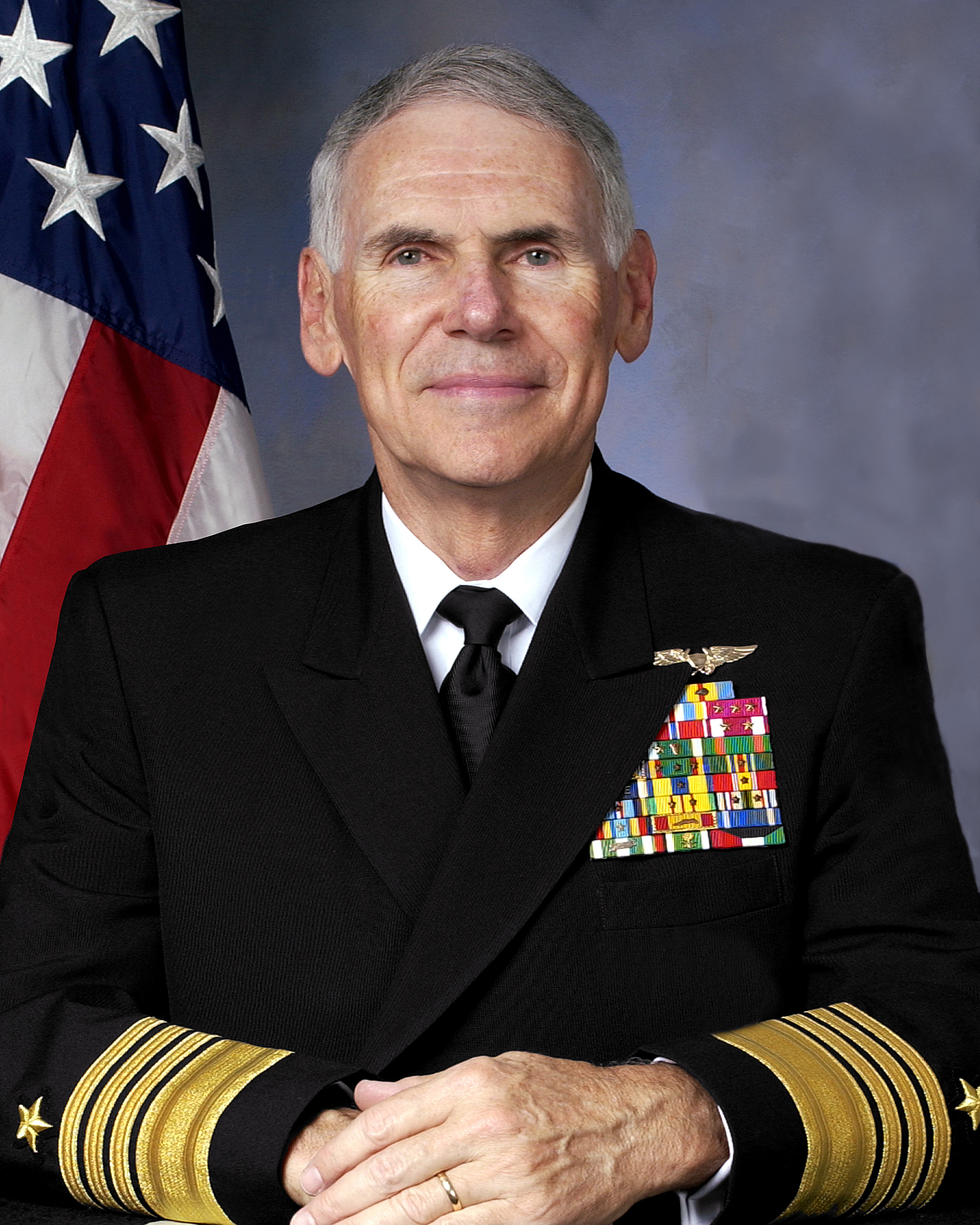
- Born: 30 December 1944 (age 81); East Orange, New Jersey, U.S.
- Military career
- Branch: United States Navy
- Service years: 1967–2008
- Rank: Admiral
- Commands: U.S. Central Command; U.S. Pacific Command; U.S. Fleet Forces Command; Vice Chief of Naval Operations; U.S. 2nd Fleet; Theodore Roosevelt Battle Group; Attack Squadron Sixty Five
- Conflicts: Vietnam War; Gulf War; Operation Deliberate Force; Iraq War
- Awards: Defense Distinguished Service Medal (3); Navy Distinguished Service Medal; Defense Superior Service Medal; Legion of Merit (4)

William Joseph Fallon (born 30 December 1944) is a retired United States Navy four-star admiral who retired after serving for over 41 years. His last military assignment was as Commander, U.S. Central Command from March 2007 to March 2008. ADM Fallon was the first Navy officer to hold that position. His other four-star assignments include Commander, U.S. Pacific Command from February 2005 to March 2007, Commander, U.S. Fleet Forces Command from October 2003 to February 2005, and 31st vice chief of Naval Operations from October 2000 to August 2003. On 11 March 2008, he announced his resignation from CENTCOM and retirement from active duty, citing administrative complications caused in part by an article in Esquire Magazine, which described him as the only thing standing between the Bush Administration and war with Iran.

== Early life and education ==
Fallon was born in East Orange, New Jersey, and raised in Merchantville, New Jersey. He graduated from Camden Catholic High School in Cherry Hill, New Jersey. A 1967 graduate of Villanova University, he received his commission through the Navy ROTC Program and was designated a Naval Flight Officer upon completion of flight training in December 1967.

Fallon is a graduate of the Naval War College in Newport, Rhode Island, and the National War College in Washington, D.C. He holds a Master of Arts Degree in International Studies from Old Dominion University. Fallon was awarded the Naval War College Distinguished Graduate Leadership Award in 2001 and granted an honorary Doctor of Military Science degree by his alma mater, Villanova University, on 17 May 2009.

== Military service ==
After flight training at Naval Air Station (NAS) Pensacola in Florida and NAS Glynco in Georgia, Fallon was assigned to fly the RA-5C Vigilante at Naval Air Station Sanford in Florida and Naval Air Station Albany in Georgia, including a combat deployment to Vietnam. He moved to the A-6E Intruder in 1974 at NAS Oceana, Virginia. All told, he served in flying assignments for 24 years with Reconnaissance Attack Squadrons (RVAH), Attack Squadrons (VA) and Carrier air wings (CVW), deploying to the Pacific, Atlantic and Indian Oceans and Mediterranean Sea, embarked in USS Saratoga, USS Ranger, USS Nimitz, USS Dwight D. Eisenhower and USS Theodore Roosevelt. He has logged more than 1,300 carrier arrested landings and over 4,800 flight hours in tactical jet aircraft.

Fallon commanded Attack Squadron 65, embarked in USS Dwight D. Eisenhower; Medium Attack Wing One at NAS Oceana; and Carrier Air Wing Eight aboard USS Theodore Roosevelt during a combat deployment to the Persian Gulf for Operation Desert Storm in 1991. Assigned as Commander, Carrier Group Eight in 1995, he deployed to the Mediterranean as Commander, Theodore Roosevelt Battle Group and commanded Battle Force Sixth Fleet (CTF 60) during NATOs combat Operation Deliberate Force in Bosnia. Admiral Fallon served as Commander, U.S. Second Fleet and Commander, Striking Fleet Atlantic from November 1997 to September 2000.

Shore duties included assignment as Aide and Flag Lieutenant to the Commander, Fleet Air Jacksonville, and to the staffs of Commander, Reconnaissance Attack Wing One; Commander, Operational Test Force, and Commander, Naval Air Force, U.S. Atlantic Fleet. He has served as Deputy Director for Operations, Joint Task Force Southwest Asia (JTF-SWA) in Riyadh, Saudi Arabia, and as Deputy Director, Aviation Plans and Requirements on the Staff of the Chief of Naval Operations in Washington, D.C. His first flag officer assignment was with NATO as Assistant Chief of Staff, Plans and Policy for Supreme Allied Commander, Atlantic. He was then assigned as Deputy and Chief of Staff, U.S. Atlantic Fleet followed by assignment as Deputy Commander in Chief and Chief of Staff, U.S. Atlantic Command. Nominated for his fourth star, he became the 31st Vice Chief of Naval Operations in October 2000.

In February 2001, while serving as Vice Chief of Naval Operations, Fallon was given Presidential special envoy status and dispatched to Japan to apologize for the collision between the U.S. Navy submarine USS Greeneville and the Japanese fisheries training vessel Ehime Maru. The accident killed nine Japanese crewmembers, including four high school students. Fallon, along with Ambassador Tom Foley, met with family members of the victims at the Ambassador's official residence in Tokyo and in the Ehime Maru's home port of Uwajima, Ehime Prefecture, bowing deeply and expressing regret on behalf of the United States and President George W. Bush. His deferential show of contrition to the families, carried out in front of news cameras, was widely credited with defusing an incident that could have damaged U.S.-Japan relations.

Fallon was in the Pentagon on September 11th, 2001.

In 2002, he told the U.S. Senate Committee on Environment and Public Works Committee that the military should be exempted from certain environmental laws because the laws affected the military's ability to conduct operations at its bases.

In February 2003, he authorized the Navy's Task Force Uniform initiative that led to the creation of the Navy Working Uniform and Navy Service Uniform.

He was then nominated and confirmed for assignment as the Commander, U.S. Fleet Forces Command and U.S. Atlantic Fleet from October 2003 to February 2005; during that time, he was assigned to Operation Iraqi Freedom. Following that, he received a rare third assignment as a four-star military officer, as Commander, U.S. Pacific Command from February 2005 until March 2007.

At Pacific Command, Fallon took a conciliatory approach towards China.

=== United States Central Command ===
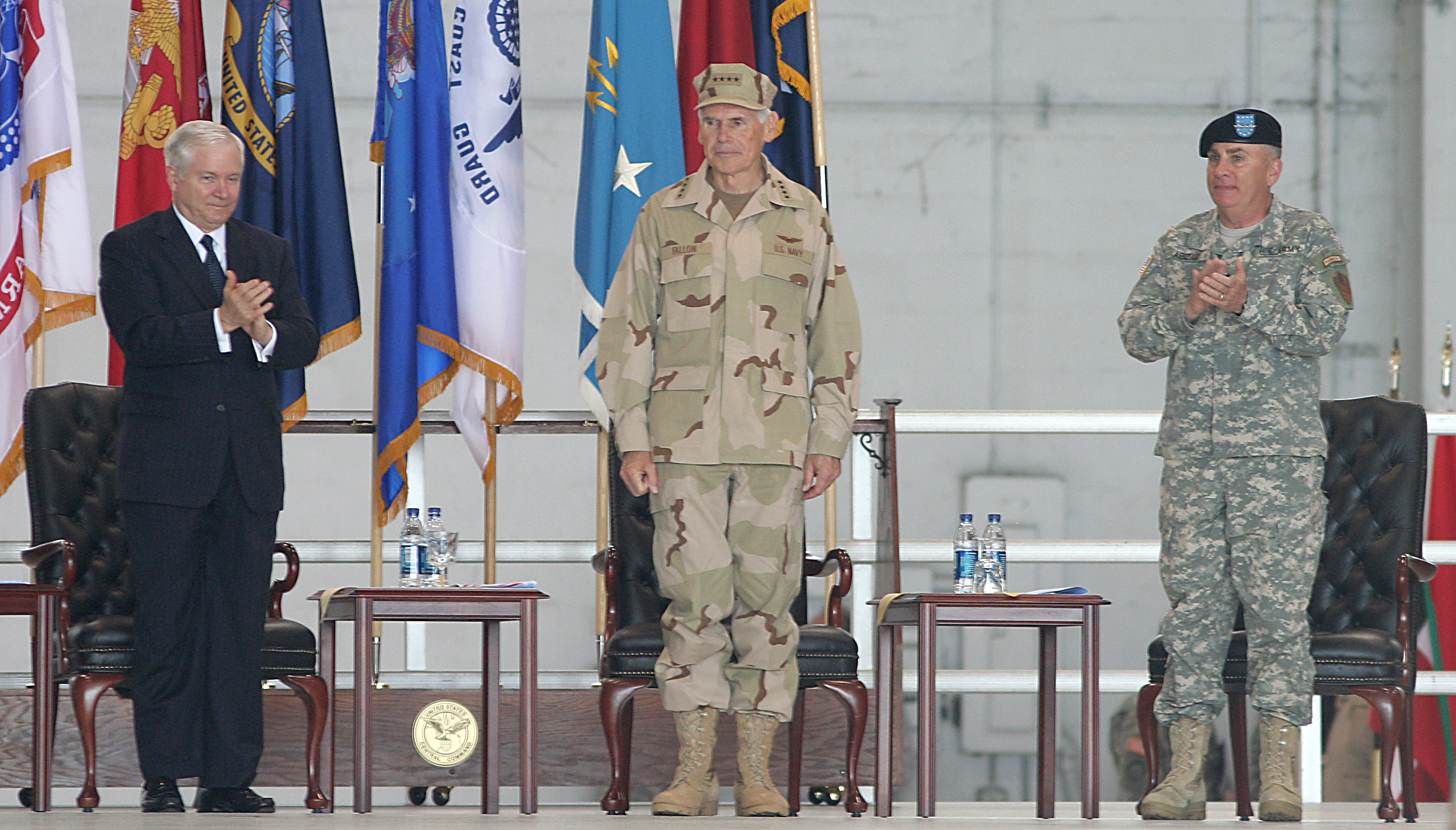
Robert Gates with Fallon and John Abizaid at the CENTCOM Change of Command ceremony, 2007

On 4 January 2007, President Bush nominated Fallon for his fourth four-star command to replace John Abizaid, who was retiring from the U.S. Army, as Commander of the United States Central Command, (CENTCOM).

The United States Senate confirmed Admiral Fallon as the first Navy admiral to command CENTCOM on February 7. He relieved General Abizaid on 16 March 2007.

As combatant commander of Central Command, Fallon was General David Petraeus's superior officer, who was at that time the commander of Multinational Force Iraq. Petraeus succeeded Fallon as CENTCOM commander, relieving the "Acting" CENTCOM Commander, then-Lieutenant General Martin Dempsey on 31 October 2008.

As CENTCOM commander, Fallon often criticized Iran while also encouraging negotiations. On 28 May 2007, he noted that the United States would continue to have a military presence in the Middle East, despite Iran wishing otherwise. However, he also said, "We have to figure out a way to come to an arrangement with them [Iran]". In an Al-Jazeera broadcast on 30 September 2007, he criticized those publicly urging war, stating "This constant drum beat of conflict is what strikes me which is not helpful and not useful. [...] I expect that there will be no war and that is what we ought to be working for." He also stated that Iran was not as strong as it claimed, "Not militarily, economically or politically." and he referred to Iranians as ants, "These guys are ants. When the time comes, you crush them."

==== Resignation ====
On 11 March 2008 Secretary of Defense Robert Gates announced the resignation of Fallon as CENTCOM Commander. He stated that Fallon's reason for resigning centered on the controversy regarding a recent article in Esquire magazine which depicted him as openly criticizing the Bush administration with specific regard to American policy towards Iran.

After his widely publicized resignation, interpreted as opposition to military action against Iran, the conservative The Washington Times countered with a report that Fallon's active and retired military critics believed that he was "pushed to resign" by higher officials because "he failed to prevent foreign fighters and munitions from entering Iraq". After his resignation as CENTCOM commander, he retired from military service.

== Post service life ==
Fallon joined the Massachusetts Institute of Technology (MIT) Center for International Studies as a Robert Wilhelm Fellow for nine months, starting August 2008. He was to collaborate with the MIT community in research, seminars, conferences and other intellectual projects.

Fallon was the commencement speaker at the 2009 commencement ceremonies at his alma mater, Villanova University. He also was the 2009 commencement speaker for the University of California, San Diego's Graduate School of International Relations and Pacific Studies.

Starting in June 2009, Admiral Fallon served as co-chair of the Center for Strategic & International Studies Commission on Smart Global Health Policy alongside the president and CEO of CARE, Helene D. Gayle where he discussed his experiences with the security dimensions of global health. Admiral Fallon contributed in multiple conferences and policy discussions and attended a summer tour of Kenya that included the Kibera slums. At a global health event in the North Carolina Research Triangle, Admiral Fallon gave the keynote address:

I spent more than 40 years of my life serving in the U.S. Navy, serving around the world, as well as Commander of both U.S. Pacific Command and U.S. Central Command. When I was a student at the U.S. Naval War College, security was defined in very traditional terms. It was the business of competing sovereign state actors with defined borders who pursue hard national interests.

Working on the ground in the far corners of the world, however, I came to appreciate that security today is much more about basic day-to-day existence – it's primarily about the security of the individual. Included in this, the way people relate to each other, their families, their jobs and their communities. It is broader and far more personal than traditional notions of security. And at the heart of human security is health.

Admiral Fallon joined Tilwell Petroleum LLC in August, 2009 as a partner and advisor for the company's strategic business development program. "We are excited to have Admiral Fallon join our team at Tilwell," said Tony Cardwell, Managing Member of Tilwell. "Admiral Fallon's extensive experience in the Navy and his work with government and non-governmental agencies is a great addition to Tilwell as we continue to expand our customer base and support for both military and commercial applications."

Admiral Fallon was named chief executive officer of NeuralIQ Government Services, Inc. in March 2010.

Admiral Fallon was on the board of directors of Frontier Services Group from April 2014 through April 2016 .

Admiral Fallon published a memoir, Decisions Discord & Diplomacy, in 2025. A large part of it is devoted to the Iraq war and related issues.

== Ranks and promotions ==
Villanova University, NROTC, Midshipman – Class of 1967

Ensign	Lieutenant, Junior Grade	Lieutenant	Lieutenant Commander	Commander	Captain
O-1	O-2	O-3	O-4	O-5	O-6
15 May 1967 (date of rank from June 7)	1 July 1968	1 July 1970	1 July 1976	1 April 1982	1 September 1988

Rear Admiral (lower half)	Rear Admiral (upper half)	Vice Admiral	Admiral
O-7	O-8	O-9	O-10
1 October 1994	1 January 1997	20 September 1998	1 November 2000

== Awards and decorations ==
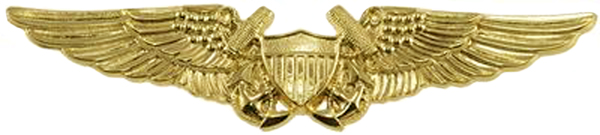
Naval Flight Officer

Defense Distinguished Service Medal with two bronze oak leaf clusters
Navy Distinguished Service Medal
Defense Superior Service Medal
Legion of Merit with three golden award stars
Bronze Star Medal
Meritorious Service Medal with two award stars
Air Medal with gold award numeral 2, Combat V and bronze strike/flight numeral 3
Navy Commendation Medal with gold award star and Valor V
Navy Achievement Medal
Joint Meritorious Unit Award
Navy Unit Commendation with 3 bronze service stars
Navy Meritorious Unit Commendation with bronze service star
Navy "E" Ribbon w/ 2 Battle E devices
Navy Expeditionary Medal with bronze service star
National Defense Service Medal with two bronze service stars
Armed Forces Expeditionary Medal with bronze service star
Vietnam Service Medal with two bronze service stars
Southwest Asia Service Medal with two bronze service stars
Navy Sea Service Deployment Ribbon with silver service star
Grand Cross of Naval Merit of Spain
Commander of the National Order of Merit (France)
Republic of Vietnam Gallantry Cross Unit Citation Ribbon
NATO Medal for Former Yugoslavia
Vietnam Campaign Medal
Kuwait Liberation Medal (Saudi Arabia)
Kuwait Liberation Medal (Kuwait)

Military offices
Preceded by Thomas B. Fargo	Commander of United States Pacific Command; 2005–2007	Succeeded by Timothy J. Keating
Preceded by John Abizaid	Commander of United States Central Command; 2007–2008	Succeeded by Martin Dempsey
