= Christine Abizaid =

American intelligence officer (born 1979)

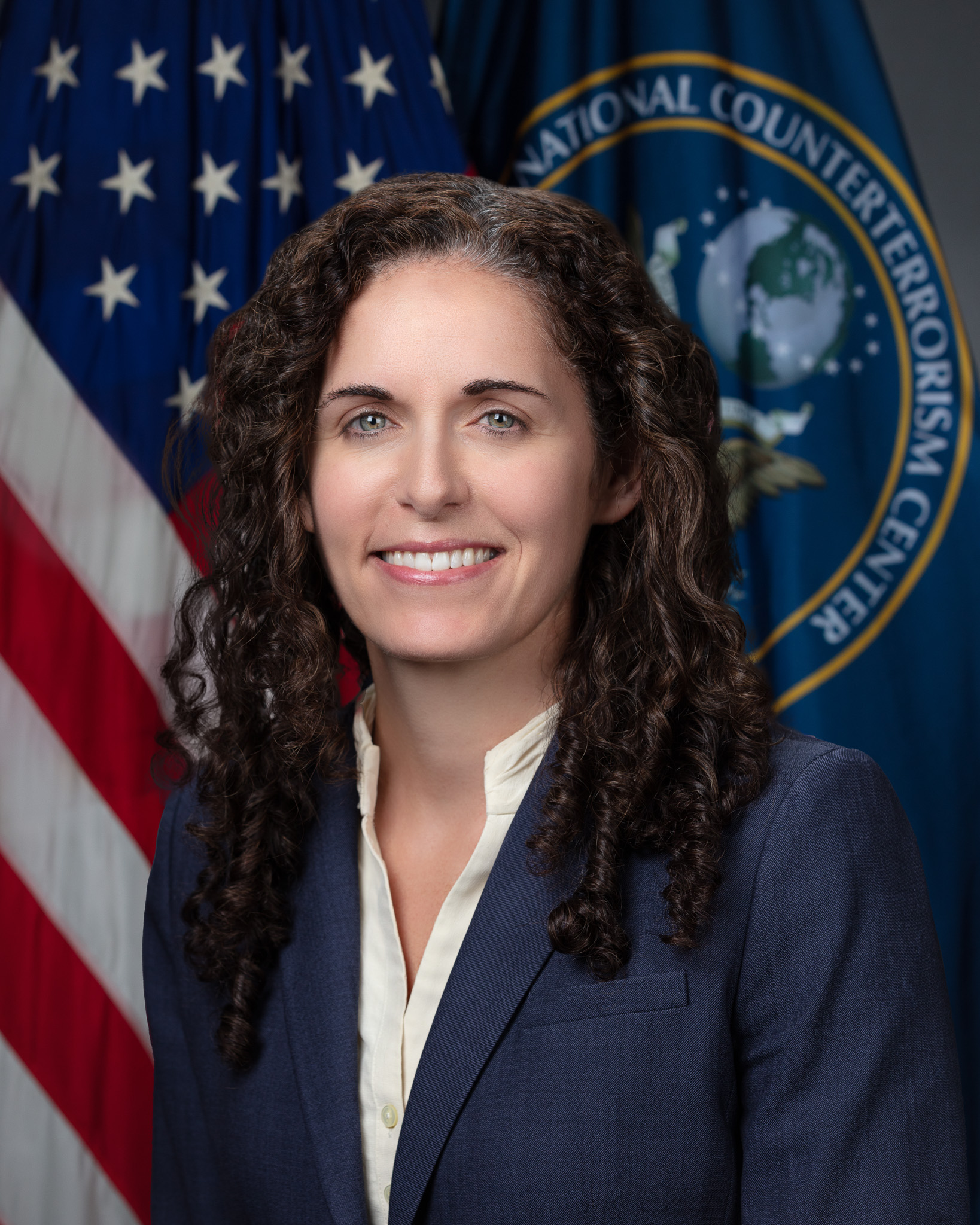

7th Director of the National Counterterrorism Center
- In office June 29, 2021 – July 5, 2024
- President: Joe Biden
- Preceded by: Christopher C. Miller
- Succeeded by: Joe Kent

Personal details
- Born: Christine Sandra Abizaid; February 7, 1979 (age 47)
- Relations: John Abizaid (father)
- Education: University of California, San Diego (BA); Stanford University (MA)
- Christine Abizaid's voice Abizaid's opening statement at a Senate Homeland Security Committee hearing on domestic threats Recorded November 17, 2022

Christine Sandra Abizaid (born February 7, 1979) is an American intelligence officer who was the director of the National Counterterrorism Center in the Biden administration from 2021 to 2024, becoming the first woman and first openly gay person to hold the position.

She previously held roles in the Defense Intelligence Agency, the National Security Council, and the Department of Defense, where she was Deputy Assistant Secretary for Afghanistan, Pakistan, and Central Asia. Abizaid also worked in the private sector with Dell and led the Defense Innovation Unit in Texas.

Appointed by President Joe Biden, her tenure at NCTC included key counter-terrorism efforts, such as the 2022 drone strike on al-Qaeda leader Ayman al-Zawahiri. She later stepped down in July 2024.

She is the daughter of General John Abizaid, former U.S. Central Command commander and U.S. ambassador to Saudi Arabia.

== Education ==
Abizaid earned a Bachelor of Arts degree in psychology from the University of California, San Diego (UCSD) and a Master of Arts in international policy studies from Stanford University.

A soccer player from an early age, Abizaid played forward for the NCAA Division II UC San Diego Tritons women's soccer team. Her 36 career assists are the second most for the team all-time. During her time with the team, the Tritons were California Collegiate Athletic Association and NCAA champions, and in her senior year she was saluted as "best of the best" by the UCSD Guardian newspaper.

== Career ==
Abizaid has worked as a counter-terrorism intelligence official in the Defense Intelligence Agency and on the United States National Security Council. During the Obama administration, she served as a senior policy advisor and assistant to the president for homeland security and counter-terrorism. In 2014, she became the deputy assistant secretary of defense for Afghanistan, Pakistan, and Central Asia.

In 2016, Ash Carter put Abizaid in charge of the Defense Innovation Unit in Austin, Texas. Moving to the private sector, she joined Dell in 2017 as director for supply chain sustainability.

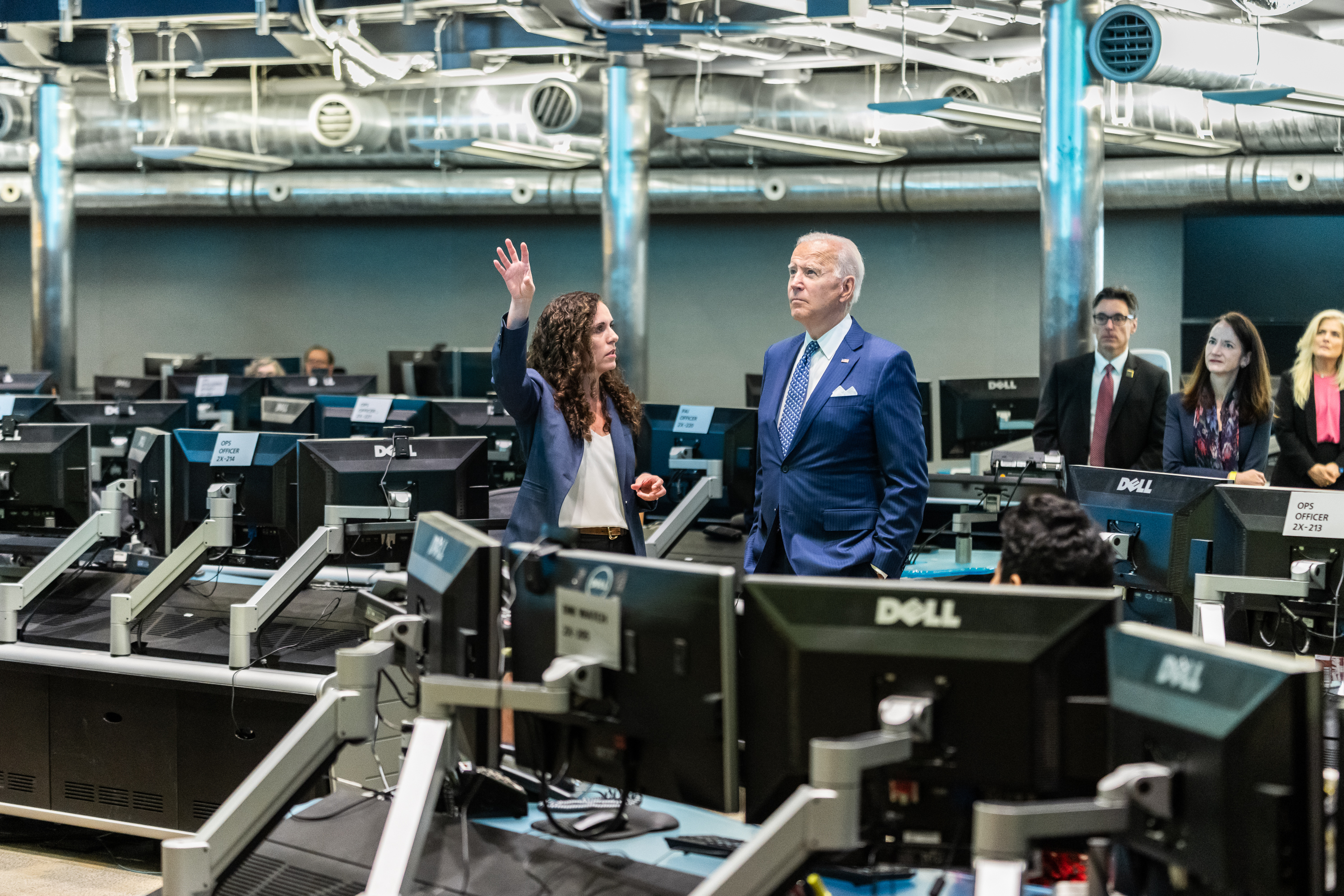
Touring the National Counterterrorism Center's Watch Floor with President Joe Biden at the ODNI Headquarters in Tysons Corner, Virginia in 2021. (Official White House Photo by Adam Schultz)

The 2019 Form 990 for the Middle East Policy Council lists Abizaid as a Director. As of December 2022 she remains listed as a Director on the organization's website.

In 2021, President Joe Biden nominated Abizaid to serve as the director of the National Counter-terrorism Center. The United States Senate Select Committee on Intelligence held open hearings on the nomination on June 9, 2021. The full Senate confirmed her nomination by voice vote on June 24, 2021.

In 2022, Abizaid participated in a July 1, 2022 Situation Room meeting with President Biden to prepare for a drone strike targeting al-Qaeda leader Ayman al-Zawahiri. The approved operation took place July 31, 2022. President Biden made a public address confirming the operation had killed Zawahiri on August 1, 2022.

In subsequent testimony to Congress, Abizaid asserted that as a result of Zawahiri's death, the threat of al-Qaeda "is less acute than at any other time since 9/11," and "the most likely threat in the United States is from lone actors, whether inspired by violent extremist narratives, racially or ethnically motivated drivers to violence, or other politically motivated violence." Writers for Lawfare were led to state that following the operation, it was "difficult to believe that [al-Qaeda] can exert the same threat given its leadership depletion".

In 2023, delivering a lecture before the Washington Institute for Near East Policy, Abizaid noted that al-Qaeda has yet to publicly announce a successor following Zawahiri's death. Her comments briefly mentioned Saif al-Adel and Abd al-Rahman al-Maghribi as possible candidates.

In 2024, Abizaid resigned from her role as the director of the National Counter-terrorism Center.

== Personal life ==
Abizaid, a Lebanese American, is the daughter of John Abizaid, a retired United States Army general who served as Commander of the U.S. Central Command during the Iraq and Afghanistan Wars, and diplomat, who served as U.S. Ambassador to Saudi Arabia under President Donald Trump.

Abizaid disclosed on her 2021 questionnaire to the United States Senate Select Committee on Intelligence that she is married to a woman. She was also accompanied to her Senate confirmation hearing by her wife, whom she acknowledged in her remarks. She was the first female and first openly gay director of the National Counter-terrorism Center.

In May 2022, Abizaid spoke with Michael Morell for the CBS News podcast Intelligence Matters, affirming her sexual orientation and that she recognizes "that it's important and it's important to be seen in the position that I'm in, that people will look at what I'm doing and will take a representation of that and latch on to it - good, bad or indifferent." The following month, she spoke to an audience at a Defense Intelligence Agency Pride Month event, speaking about having once been closeted at the agency. She commented that, "I could have been more brave and placed more trust in people," and that "frankly, it's just easier," being open.
