= Glenn S. Gerstell =

American attorney

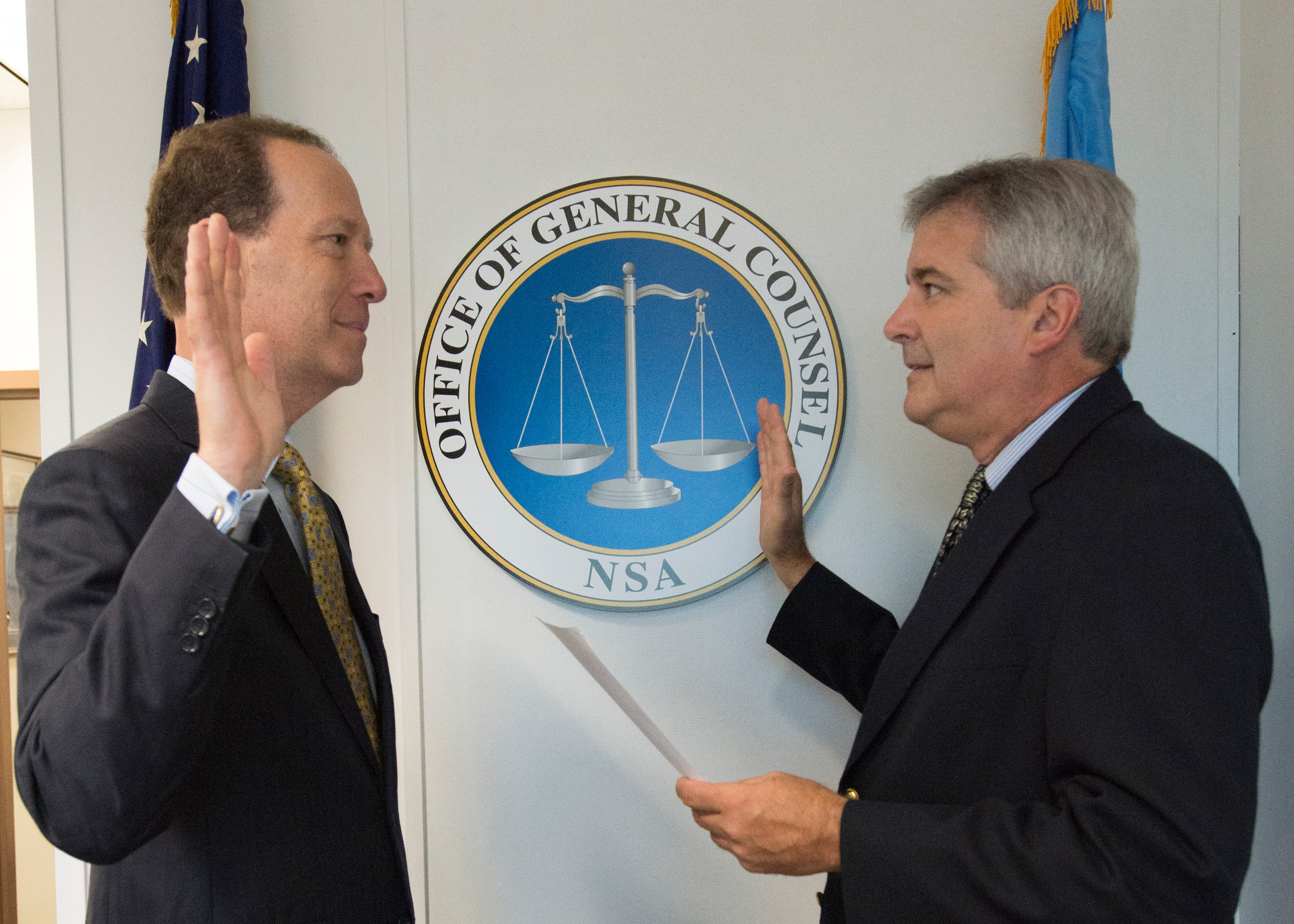
- Glenn S. Gerstell (left) being sworn in as the NSA General Counsel at a ceremony at Fort Meade headquarters.
- Education: New York University (BA); Columbia University (JD)
- Title: General Counsel, National Security Agency
- Term: 2015–2020

Glenn S. Gerstell is an American lawyer, technology writer, and former government official. Gerstell served as the General Counsel of the United States National Security Agency (NSA) from 2015 to 2020. He is a senior adviser at the Center for Strategic & International Studies (CSIS) and previously was a member of the US National Infrastructure Advisory Council and a Commissioner of the Washington, D.C. Homeland Security Commission.

== Education ==
After earning his B.A. cum laude in political science and government at New York University, Gerstell went to Columbia Law School and earned his J.D. degree in 1976.

== Career ==
Gerstell practiced law for nearly 40 years at the international law firm of Milbank LLP where he served for 18 years (1976 to 2015) as the managing partner of the Milbank's Washington, D.C., office. He previously led the firm's Singapore and Hong Kong offices.

Gerstell is a member of the Council on Foreign Relations and an elected member of the American Academy of Diplomacy. He was also an adjunct law professor at the Georgetown University school of Law and the New York Law school.

=== Government career ===
Gerstell served as the chairman of the District of Columbia Water and Sewer Authority from 2001 to 2007. He was appointed by President Barack Obama to serve on the National Infrastructure Advisory Council in 2011, and served in the role until 2015. He was a member of the Washington, D.C. Homeland Security Commission from 2013 to 2015.

In August 2015 Gerstell was appointed as the General Counsel of the NSA, in which capacity he served as the principal lawyer for the agency and legal advisor to the Director of the National Security Agency. Gerstell occasionally served as a spokesperson for the NSA in legal and policy areas, especially on technology and privacy topics.

=== Post-government career ===
Gerstell resigned from NSA in early 2020 and joined the Center for Strategic and International Studies in Washington DC as a senior adviser. In this role, he has continued to write on technology and national security matters.

In October 2020, Gerstell was among 51 former intelligence officials who signed a letter stating that the leaking of the Hunter Biden laptop story “has the classic earmarks of a Russian information operation; although the officials "emphasize that we do not know if the emails [the subject of the story]...are genuine or not and that we do not have evidence of Russian involvement." It was in fact revealed the laptop contained no concrete evidence of Russian disinformation, and portions of its contents have been verified as authentic.

Gerstell has focused on threats posed by the People's Republic of China. In 2023, Gerstell expressed concern about JPMorgan Chase's commercial partnership with TikTok parent company ByteDance on payments technology. He argued it was a "step in assisting a major Chinese company, ByteDance, facilitate payments on a platform that does present national security risks." He has advocated for improving the security of the U.S. Department of Defense's supply chain to keep out unwanted Chinese components and has warned about the extent of Chinese hacking of American communications systems and infrastructure.
