= Director of Central Intelligence Directive =

A Director of Central Intelligence Directive (DCID) is a policy and guidance document issued by the director of central intelligence that provides guidance and direction to members of the United States Intelligence Community. Many DCIDs have been superseded or modified by Intelligence Community Directives (ICD) issued by the director of national intelligence.
