= Michael Leiter =

Director of the US National Counterterrorism Center (2007–2011)

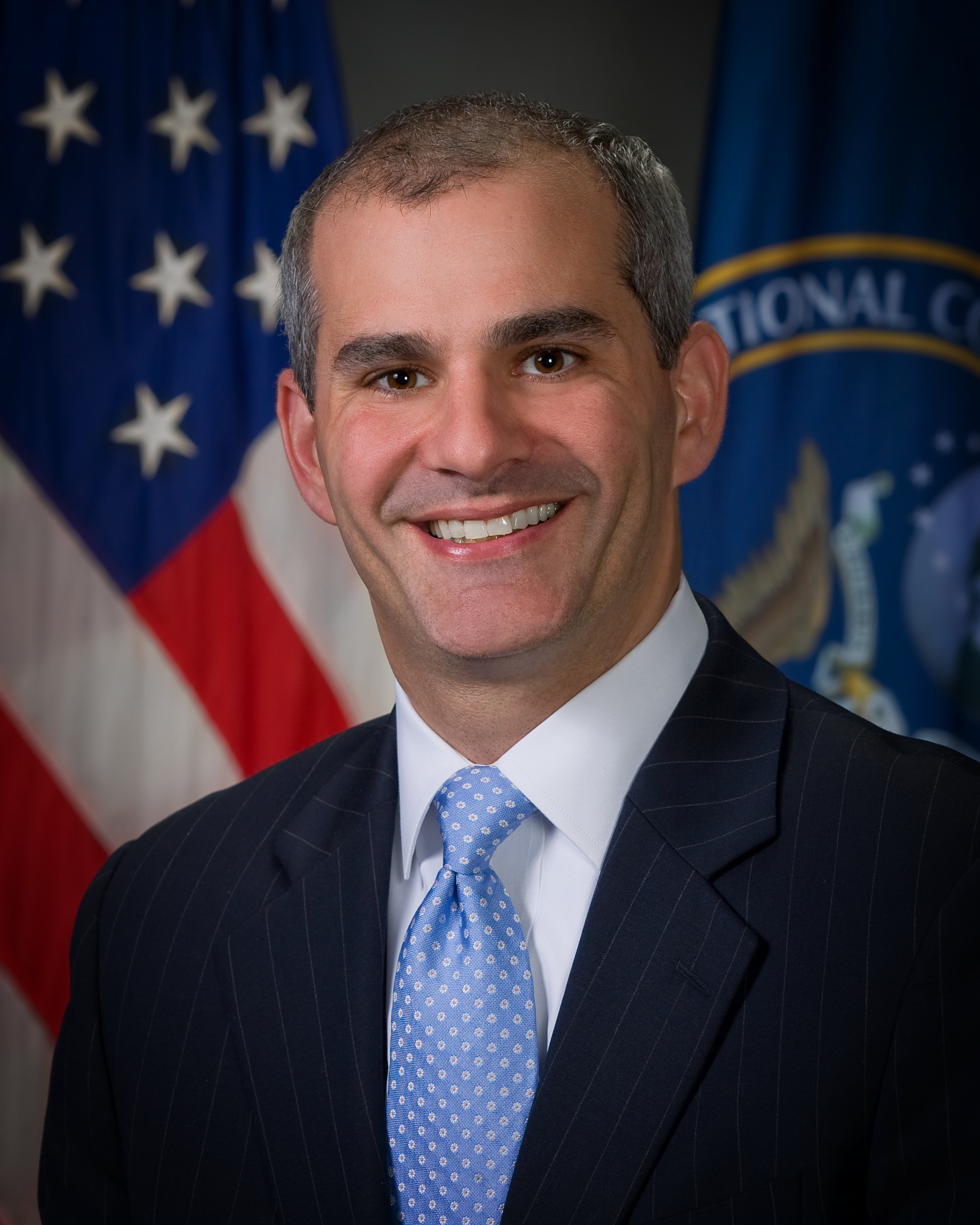

2nd Director of the National Counterterrorism Center
- In office June 12, 2008 – July 8, 2011; Acting: November 10, 2007 – June 12, 2008
- President: George W. Bush; Barack Obama
- Preceded by: John Redd
- Succeeded by: Matthew Olsen

Personal details
- Born: Englewood, New Jersey, U.S.
- Education: Columbia University (BA); Harvard University (JD)

Michael E. Leiter is an American lawyer and the former director of the United States National Counterterrorism Center (NCTC), having served in the Bush administration and been retained in the Obama administration. A statement released by the White House announced his resignation, effective July 8, 2011. His successor, Matthew G. Olsen, was sworn in on August 16, 2011. In September 2017, Leiter joined international law firm Skadden, Arps, Slate, Meagher & Flom in Washington, D.C. as a partner in its national security practice.

== Education and military service ==
Leiter grew up in Englewood, New Jersey, where he attended Dwight-Englewood School, from which he graduated in 1987. He received his B.A. from Columbia University in 1991. From 1991 until 1997, he served as a Naval Flight Officer and crewmember aboard EA-6B Prowlers in the U.S. Navy, participating in U.S., NATO, and UN operations in the former Yugoslavia and Iraq. He then earned his J.D. from Harvard Law School, where he graduated magna cum laude in 2000 and was the 113th president of the Harvard Law Review. Leiter also served as a Harvard Law School human rights fellow with the International Criminal Tribunal for the former Yugoslavia in The Hague.

== Career ==
After law school, Leiter served as a law clerk to Associate Justice Stephen Breyer of the Supreme Court of the United States, and to Chief Judge Michael Boudin of the U.S. Court of Appeals for the First Circuit.

From 2002 until 2005, he served with the Department of Justice as an assistant United States attorney for the Eastern District of Virginia. At the Justice Department, Leiter prosecuted a wide variety of federal crimes, including narcotics offenses, organized crime and racketeering, capital murder, and money laundering.

Leiter then served as the deputy general counsel and assistant director of the President's Commission on the Intelligence Capabilities of the United States Regarding Weapons of Mass Destruction (the "Robb-Silberman Commission"). While with the Robb-Silberman Commission, Leiter focused on reforms of the U.S. Intelligence Community, in particular the development of what is now the National Security Branch of the Federal Bureau of Investigation.

Immediately prior to joining NCTC, Leiter served as the deputy chief of staff for the Office of the Director of National Intelligence (ODNI). In this role, Mr. Leiter assisted in the establishment of the ODNI and coordinated all internal and external operations for the ODNI, to include relationships with the White House, the Departments of Defense, State, Justice, and Homeland Security, the Central Intelligence Agency, and Congress. He was also involved in the development of national intelligence centers, including NCTC and the National Counterproliferation Center, and their integration into the larger Intelligence Community. In addition, he served as an intelligence and policy advisor to the director of national intelligence and his principal deputy.

He became director of the NCTC in 2007, and was asked to stay on by the Obama administration in 2009. On June 9, 2011, President Obama praised and thanked Mike Leiter in a statement regarding his resignation; "Serving in two Administrations since 2007, Mike led the National Counterterrorism Center with dedication and unwavering determination during challenging and demanding times and our nation is grateful for his many contributions to our safety and security. Mike has been a trusted advisor to me and to the entire national security team, providing us with an in-depth understanding of terrorist activities that affect our Nation's security. I am confident that Mike will be leaving the National Counterterrorism Center, the counterterrorism community, and the nation in a significantly stronger position to confront the terrorist threats we face."

Following his departure from the NCTC in 2011, Leiter joined the data analysis software firm Palantir Technologies as senior counselor to CEO Alex Karp. His role was stated to be to develop and optimize market strategy, business practices and internal operations. Leiter also became a counterterrorism, cybersecurity and national security analyst for NBC News shortly thereafter. Since becoming a part of Palantir Leiter has continued to publicly speak and participate in forums for discussion of national security and counterterrorism.

Leiter joined Leidos as executive vice president for business development and strategy in November 2014. He currently serves as the executive vice president and head of integration at Leidos and reports to the chief executive officer. In this role, he is responsible for leading the integration management team that is responsible for all planning activities associated with the transaction to combine Leidos and Lockheed Martin's Information Systems and Global Solutions (IS&GS) business. The merger is expected to close in late 2016. Leiter rose to president of the Leidos defense group before leaving the company in January 2017.

In September 2017, Leiter joined international law firm Skadden, Arps, Slate, Meagher & Flom in Washington, D.C. as a partner in its national security practice.

In 2020, Leiter, along with over 130 other former Republican national security officials, signed a statement that asserted that President Trump was unfit to serve another term, and "To that end, we are firmly convinced that it is in the best interest of our nation that Vice President Joe Biden be elected as the next President of the United States, and we will vote for him."

As of 2024, he chairs the board of trustees of Rand Corporation.

== Controversy ==
Under Leiter's service, the NCTC was publicly criticized for failing to identify the threat posed by a known extremist, Umar Farouk Abdulmutallab, who on Christmas Day 2009 succeeded in boarding a Delta airplane in Amsterdam rigged with an explosive device that failed to detonate over Detroit, Michigan. Abdulmutallab was wrestled down by a passenger amidst a smokey fire which put an end to the incident.

In an article printed by The New York Times on December 31, 2009, the agency, which was stood up specifically to coordinate counterterrorism information, was said to have failed to accomplish its mission, even where several valid leads were available and known among multiple intelligence agencies, including information directly communicated to the CIA by the Abdulmatallab's father who feared his son had been radicalized. Though Michael Leiter was not himself mentioned, the New York Times piece described the NCTC as the weak link in the series of significant intelligence operations.

On January 2, 2010, Leiter issued the following statement. "The failed attempt to destroy Northwest Flight 253 is the starkest of reminders of the insidious terrorist threats we face. While this attempt ended in failure we know with absolute certainty that Al-Qaeda and those who support its ideology continue to refine their methods to test our defenses and pursue an attack on the Homeland. Our most sacred responsibility is to be focused on our mission—detecting and preventing terrorist attacks from happening on our soil and against U.S. interests. The American people expect and deserve nothing less."

James Gordon Meek of New York's Daily News issued a story on January 7 stating that Leiter remained on a ski holiday until "several days after Christmas" quoting two U.S. Officials. The article reported that "people have been grumbling that he didn't let a little terrorism interrupt his vacation". On balance, it was stated that "Leiter has long been well-regarded" and "President Obama, himself, stayed in Hawaii [on vacation] until January 4". There was no reference to Leiter conducting investigation or evaluation from his remote vacation site.

The Daily News story by Meek was inaccurate and was updated in the Daily News the next day, ABC news Senior White House Correspondent Jake Tapper reported that Leiter was indeed at his post at the NCTC during the events of December 25, 2009. In the report, Denis McDonough, National Security Staff Chief of Staff, said that "Leiter was -- throughout the events of December 25, 2009 -- indeed at the National Counterterrorism Center in McLean, Virginia, and intimately involved in all aspects of the nation's response to the attempted terrorist attack -- to include coordinating intelligence, examining terrorist watch-listing, and briefing Members of Congress." He Continued, "Director Leiter engaged in regular, repeated, and extended classified discussions with the White House, the President's National Security Staff located in Hawaii, the Director of National Intelligence, the Department of Homeland Security, various members of Congress and their staffs, and of course the National Counterterrorism Center."

== See also ==
- List of law clerks for the second seat of the Supreme Court of the United States

Political offices
Preceded by John Redd	Director of the National Counterterrorism Center; 2007–2011	Succeeded by Matthew G. Olsen
