= John O. Brennan =

Director of the Central Intelligence Agency from 2013 to 2017

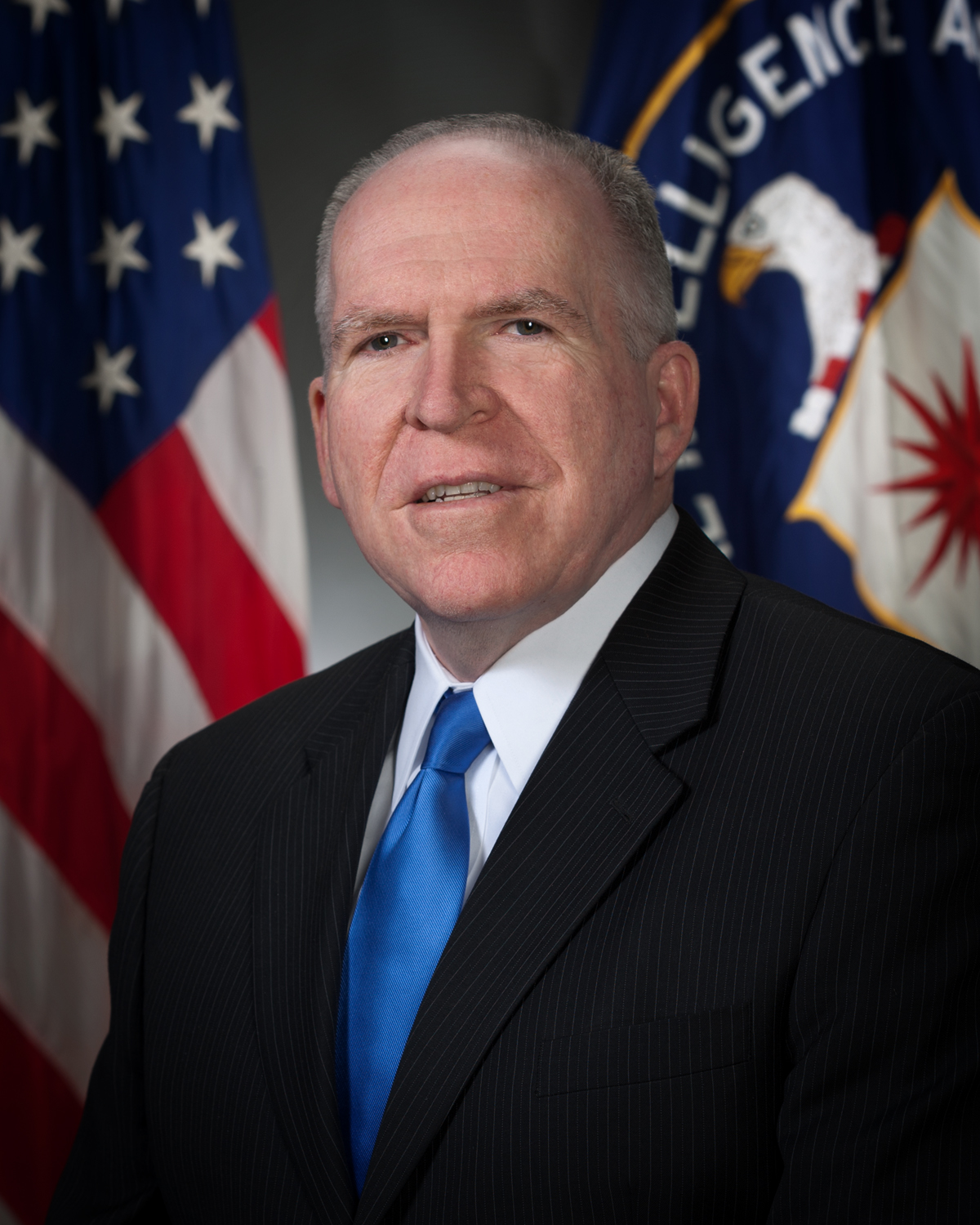
- Official portrait, 2013

5th Director of the Central Intelligence Agency
- In office March 8, 2013 – January 20, 2017
- President: Barack Obama
- Deputy: Avril Haines; David Cohen
- Preceded by: David Petraeus
- Succeeded by: Mike Pompeo

5th United States Homeland Security Advisor
- In office January 20, 2009 – March 8, 2013
- President: Barack Obama
- Preceded by: Ken Wainstein
- Succeeded by: Lisa Monaco

Acting Director of the National Counterterrorism Center
- In office August 27, 2004 – August 1, 2005
- President: George W. Bush
- Preceded by: Position established
- Succeeded by: John Scott Redd

Personal details
- Born: John Owen Brennan; September 22, 1955 (age 71) North Bergen, New Jersey, U.S.
- Spouse: Kathy Pokluda
- Children: 3
- Education: Fordham University (BA); University of Texas at Austin (MA)
- Brennan's voice Brennan testifies before the Senate Intelligence Committee on CIA operations and resources. Recorded June 16, 2016

John Owen Brennan (born September 22, 1955) is an American former intelligence officer who served as the director of the Central Intelligence Agency (CIA) from March 2013 to January 2017. He served as chief counterterrorism advisor to U.S. president Barack Obama, with the title Deputy National Security Advisor for Homeland Security and Counterterrorism, and Assistant to the President. Previously, he advised Obama on foreign policy and intelligence issues during his 2008 presidential campaign and presidential transition.

Brennan withdrew his name from consideration for Director of the Central Intelligence Agency (CIA) during Obama's first term over concerns about his support for torture, after defending on television the transferring of terror suspects to countries where they might be tortured while serving under President George W. Bush. Instead, Brennan was appointed Deputy National Security Advisor, a position which did not require Senate confirmation.

Brennan's 25 years with the CIA included work as a Near East and South Asia analyst, as station chief in Saudi Arabia, and as director of the National Counterterrorism Center. After leaving government service in 2005, Brennan became CEO of the Analysis Corporation, a security consulting business, and served as chairman of the Intelligence and National Security Alliance, an association of intelligence professionals.

Brennan served in the White House as Assistant to the President for Homeland Security between 2009 and 2013. Obama nominated Brennan as his next director of the CIA on January 7, 2013. The ACLU called for the Senate not to proceed with the appointment until they confirmed that "all of his conduct was within the law" at the CIA and White House. Brennan was approved by the Senate Intelligence Committee on March 5, 2013, to succeed David Petraeus as the Director of the CIA by a vote of 12 to 3.

In October 2020, Brennan was among 51 former intelligence officials who signed an open letter stating that the Hunter Biden laptop controversy had "earmarks of a Russian information operation". On January 20, 2025, President Donald Trump signed an executive order revoking the security clearances of Brennan and the other signatories. As of September 2025, a Department of Justice criminal investigation into Brennan was reported to be ongoing.

Brennan serves as a senior national security and intelligence analyst for NBC News and MSNBC. His inaugural appearance was on Meet the Press with Chuck Todd on Sunday, February 4, 2018.

== Early life ==
Brennan was born and raised in North Bergen, New Jersey, the son of Owen V. and Dorothy (Dunn) Brennan. His Irish father, a blacksmith, emigrated from County Roscommon, Ireland, to New Jersey in 1948. He became a steamfitter, working in Hoboken at Maxwell House. His mother was born in Jersey City and was raised in Hoboken. His mother was a graduate of Sacred Heart Academy and employed by the Moore-McCormick shipping company as well as being an active community volunteer. His family includes a sister and a brother. Brennan attended the Immaculate Heart of Mary Elementary School and was graduated from Saint Joseph of the Palisades High School in West New York, New Jersey.

== Education ==
Brennan attended Fordham University and earned a B.A. in political science in 1977. His studies included a junior year abroad learning Arabic and taking courses at the American University in Cairo. He speaks Arabic fluently. While a college student, he voted for the Communist Party USA candidate, Gus Hall, in the 1976 presidential election. He later described his vote as a way of "signaling my unhappiness with the system", specifically the partisanship of the Watergate era. After Fordham, Brennan attended the University of Texas at Austin, receiving a Master of Arts in government with a concentration in Middle East studies in 1980.

While riding a bus to class, he saw a CIA recruiting ad in The New York Times. He decided that a CIA career would be a good match for his "wanderlust" and his desire for public service. He applied to the CIA in 1980. During the application process, he admitted during a lie-detector test that he had voted for the Communist Party candidate four years earlier. To his surprise, he was still accepted; he later said that he found it heartening that the CIA valued freedom of speech.

== Career ==
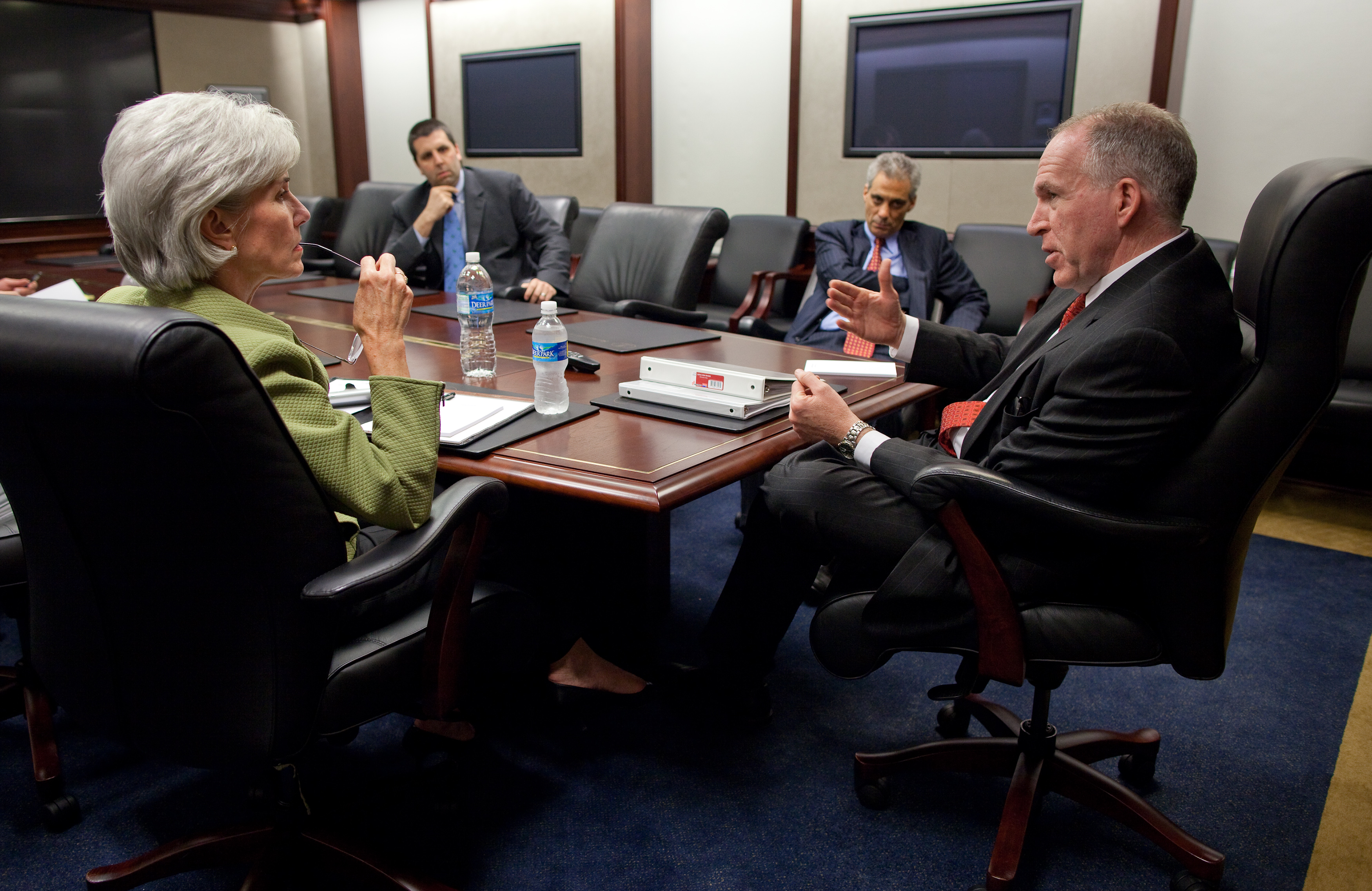
Brennan with Kathleen Sebelius and Rahm Emanuel, White House, April 2009

Brennan began his CIA career as an analyst and spent 25 years with the agency. He was a daily intelligence briefer for President Bill Clinton. In 1996, he was CIA station chief in Riyadh, Saudi Arabia, when the Khobar Towers bombing killed 19 U.S. servicemen. In 1999, he was appointed chief of staff to George Tenet, then-Director of the CIA. Brennan became deputy executive director of the CIA in March 2001. He was director of the newly created Terrorist Threat Integration Center from 2003 to 2004, an office that sifted through and compiled information for President Bush's daily top secret intelligence briefings and employed the services of analysts from a dozen U.S. agencies and entities.

Brennan then left government service for a few years, becoming Chairman of the Intelligence and National Security Alliance (INSA) and the CEO of The Analysis Corporation (TAC). He continued to lead TAC after its acquisition by Global Strategies Group in 2007 and its growth as the Global Intelligence Solutions division of Global's North American technology business GTEC, before returning to government service with the Obama administration as Homeland Security Advisor on January 20, 2009.

On January 7, 2013, President Obama nominated Brennan to be director of the Central Intelligence Agency.

On January 20, 2017, Brennan's CIA appointment ended, and he was replaced by President Trump's nominee Mike Pompeo on January 23, 2017.

In September 2017, Brennan was named a Distinguished Non-Resident Scholar at The University of Texas at Austin, where he also acts as a senior advisor to the University's Intelligence Studies Project. He serves as a consultant on world events for Kissinger Associates.

=== Counterterrorism advisor to President Obama ===
Brennan was an early national security adviser to then-candidate Obama. In late 2008, Brennan was reportedly the top choice to become the Director of the CIA in the incoming Obama administration. However, Brennan withdrew his name from consideration because of opposition to his CIA service under President George W. Bush and past public statements he had made in support of enhanced interrogation and the transfer of terrorism suspects to countries where they might be tortured (extraordinary rendition). President Obama then appointed him to be his Deputy National Security Advisor for Homeland Security and Counterterrorism, the president's chief counterterrorism advisor and a position that did not require Senate confirmation. His responsibilities included overseeing plans to protect the country from terrorism and respond to natural disasters, and he met with the president daily.

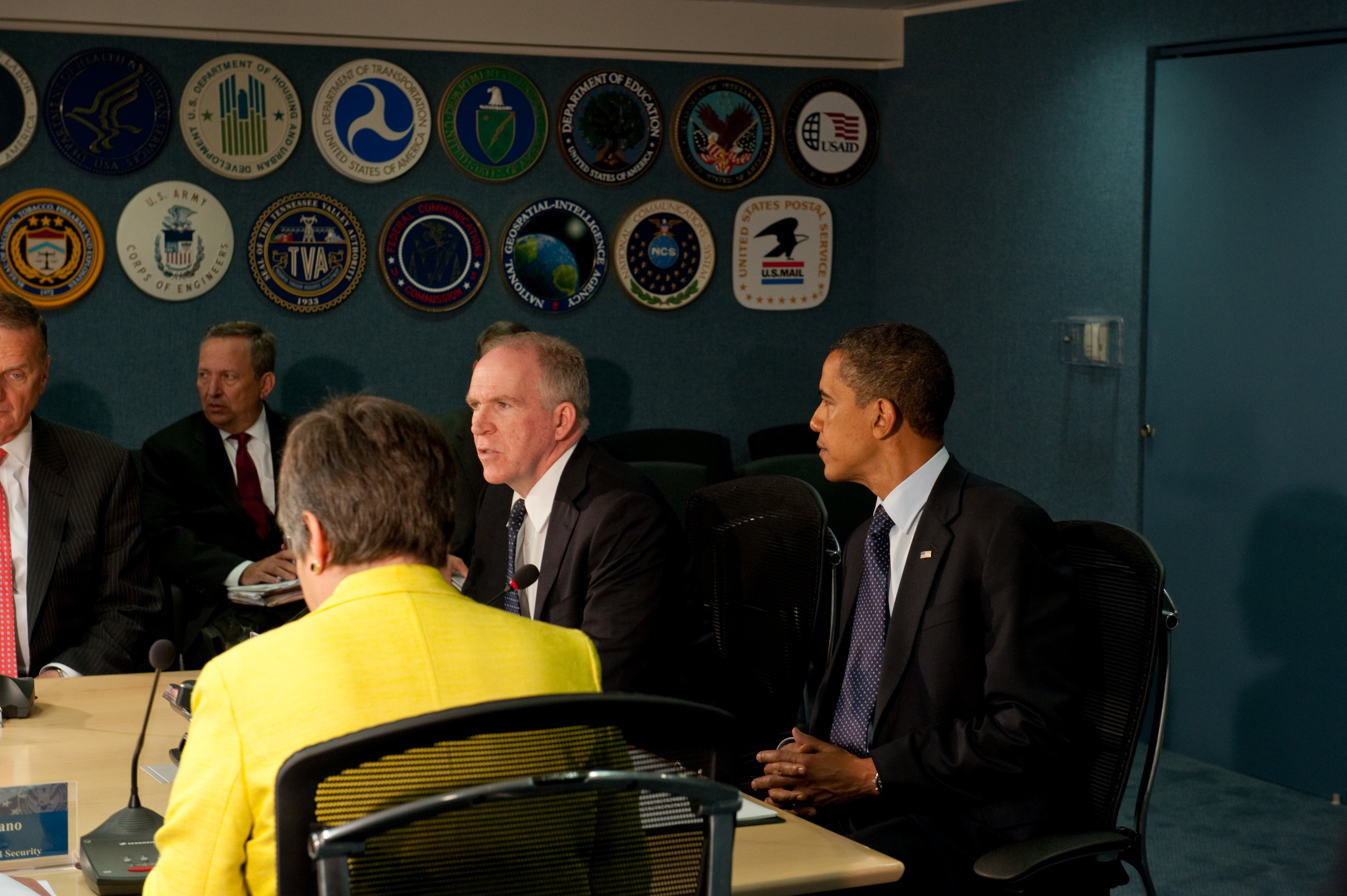
Brennan and President Barack Obama at a meeting of the Homeland Security Council, May 2009

In August 2009, Brennan criticized some Bush-administration anti-terror policies, saying that waterboarding had threatened national security by increasing the recruitment of terrorists and decreasing the willingness of other nations to cooperate with the U.S. He also described the Obama administration's focus as being on "extremists" and not "jihadists". He said that using the second term, which means one who is struggling for a holy goal, gives "these murderers the religious legitimacy they desperately seek" and suggests the US is at war with the religion of Islam. Brennan told The New York Times in January 2010, "I was somebody who did oppose waterboarding," a claim that he repeated in 2013, during the Senate's hearings about whether to confirm him as Obama's CIA director. None of Brennan's superior officers at the CIA, however, recall hearing his objections, and in 2018, Brennan admitted to The New York Times, "It wasn't as though I was wearing that opposition on my sleeve throughout the agency. I expressed it privately, to individuals."

In an early December 2009 interview with the Bergen Record, Brennan remarked, "the U.S. intelligence and law enforcement communities have to bat 1.000 every day. The terrorists are trying to be successful just once." At a press conference days after the failed Christmas Day bomb attack on Northwest Airlines Flight 253 by Umar Farouk Abdulmutallab, Brennan said U.S. intelligence agencies did not miss any signs that could have prevented the attempt but later said he had let the president down by underestimating a small group of Yemeni terrorists and not connecting them to the attempted bomber. Within two weeks after the incident, however, he produced a report highly critical of the performance of U.S. intelligence agencies, concluding that their focus on terrorist attempts aimed at U.S. soil was inadequate. In February 2010, he claimed on Meet the Press that he was tired of Republican lawmakers using national security issues as political footballs, and making allegations where they did not know the facts.

Brennan was present in the Situation Room in May 2011 when the United States conducted the military operation that killed Osama bin Laden. He called Obama's decision to go forward with the mission one of the "gutsiest calls of any president in memory". In the aftermath of the operation, Brennan said that the U.S. troops in the raid had been "met with a great deal of resistance", and bin Laden had used a woman as a human shield.

==== Drone program ====
In April 2012, Brennan was the first Obama administration official to publicly acknowledge CIA drone strikes in Pakistan, Yemen, Somalia, Libya, Afghanistan, and elsewhere. In his speech, he explained the legality, morality, and effectiveness of the program. The ACLU and other organizations disagreed. In 2011–2012, he also helped reorganize the process, under the aegis of the Disposition Matrix database, by which people outside of war zones were put on the list of drone targets. According to an Associated Press story, the reorganization helped "concentrate power" over the process inside the White House administration. According to The New York Times, Brennan was the "principal coordinator" of U.S. kill lists. Former Obama administration counter-terrorism official Daniel Benjamin has stated that Brennan "probably had more power and influence than anyone in a comparable position in the last 20 years".

In June 2011, Brennan claimed that US counter-terrorism operations had not resulted in "a single collateral death" in the past year because of the "precision of the capabilities that we've been able to develop". Nine months later, Brennan claimed he had said "we had no information" about any civilian, noncombatant deaths during the timeframe in question. The Bureau of Investigative Journalism disagreed with Brennan, citing their own research that initially led them to believe that 45 to 56 civilians, including six children, had been killed by ten US drone strikes during the year-long period in question. Additional research led the Bureau to raise their estimate to 76 deaths, including eight children and two women. According to the Bureau, Brennan's claims "do not appear to bear scrutiny". The Atlantic has been harsher in its criticism, saying, "Brennan has been willing to lie about those drone strikes to hide ugly realities."

According to the Bureau of Investigative Journalism, Brennan's comments about collateral death are perhaps explained by a counting method that treats all military-aged males in a strike zone as combatants unless there is explicit information to prove them innocent.

=== CIA Director (2013–2017) ===
==== Nomination ====
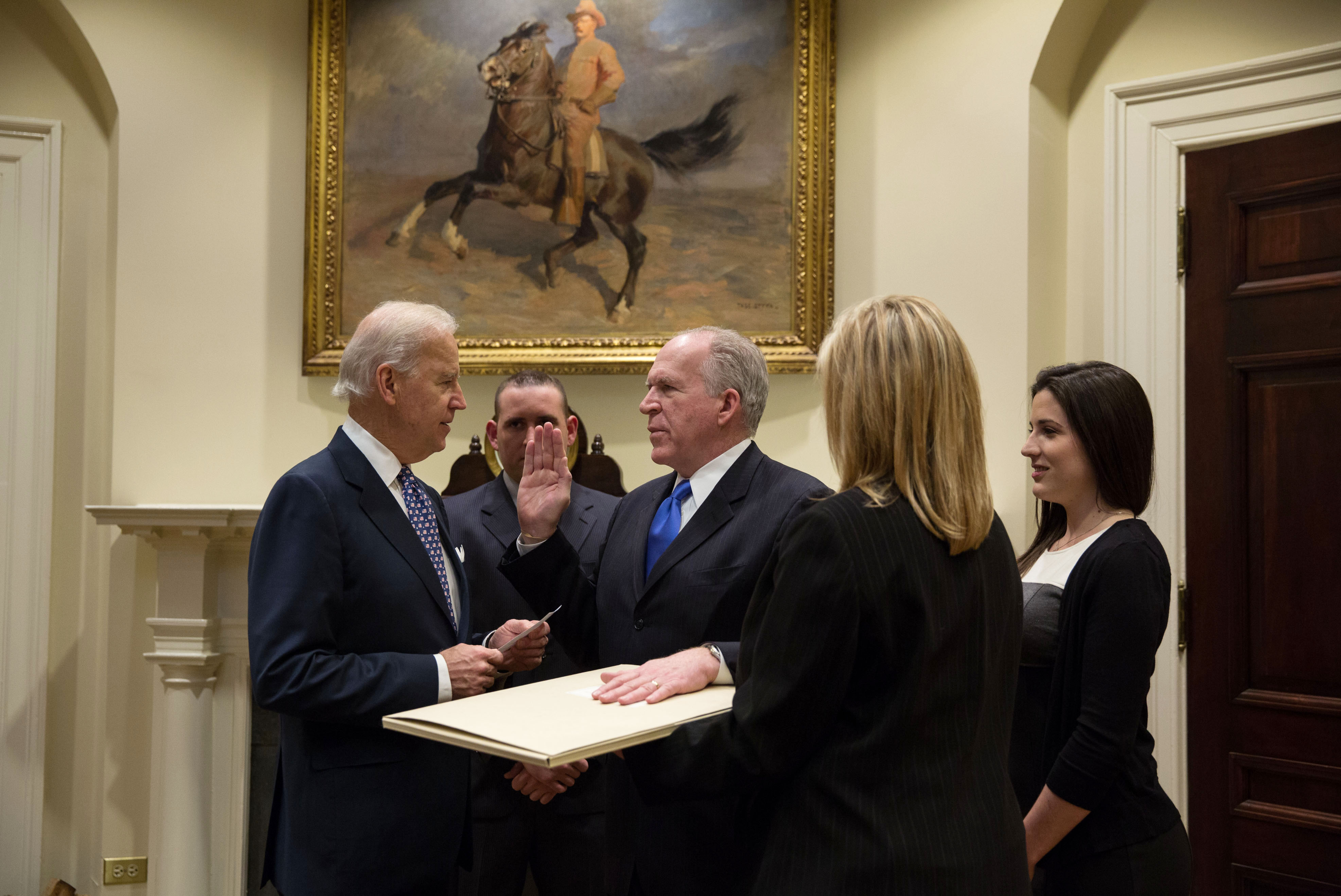
Brennan being sworn in as CIA Director, March 8, 2013

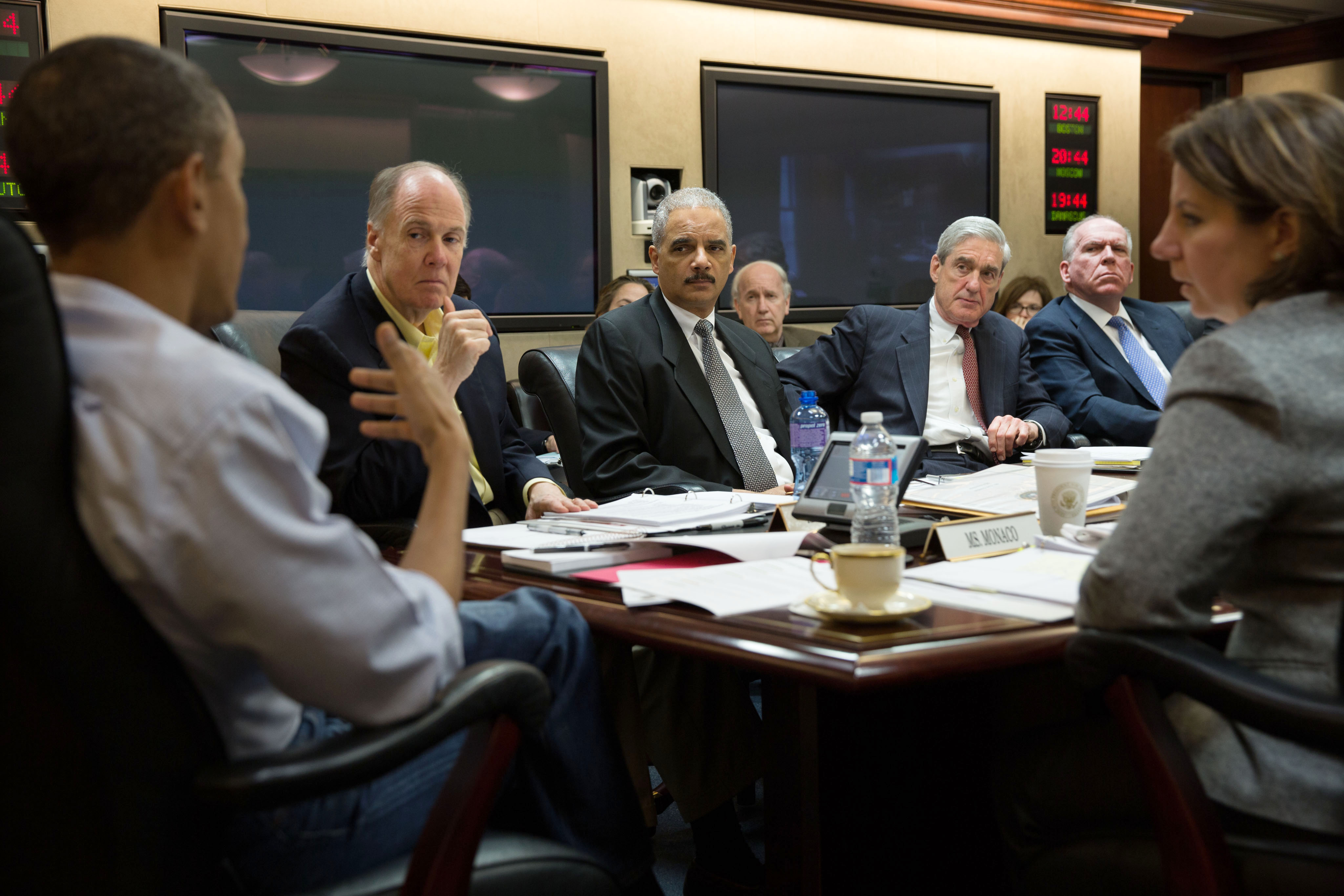
Brennan at the White House in April 2013, discussing the Boston Marathon bombing

Obama twice nominated Brennan to serve as Director of the Central Intelligence Agency. Morris Davis, a former Chief Prosecutor for the Guantanamo Military Commissions compared Brennan to Canadian Omar Khadr, who was convicted of "committing murder in violation of the law of war". He suggested that Brennan's role in targeting individuals for CIA missile strikes was no more authorized than the throwing of the grenade of which Khadr was accused.

On February 27, 2013, the Senate Intelligence Committee postponed a vote on the confirmation of Brennan, expected to be taken the next day, until the following week. On March 5, the Intelligence Committee approved the nomination 12–3. The Senate was set to vote on Brennan's nomination on March 6, 2013. However, Kentucky Senator Rand Paul began a talking Senate filibuster prior to the vote, citing Obama and his administration's use of combat drones against Americans, stating "No one politician should be allowed to judge the guilt, to charge an individual, to judge the guilt of an individual and to execute an individual. It goes against everything that we fundamentally believe in our country." Paul's filibuster continued for 13 hours, ending with the words: "I'm hopeful that we have drawn attention to this issue, that this issue will not fade away, and that the president will come up with a response." After the filibuster, Brennan was confirmed by a vote of 63–34. He was sworn into the office of CIA Director on March 8, 2013.

==== Tenure ====
Two months after assuming his post at the CIA, Brennan replaced Gina Haspel, head of the National Clandestine Service with another unidentified, career intelligence officer and former Marine. In June 2013, Brennan installed Avril Haines as Deputy Director of the Agency.

In April 2014, Brennan visited Kyiv where he met with Ukrainian Prime Minister Arseniy Yatsenyuk and First Deputy Prime Minister Vitaliy Yarema and purportedly discussed intelligence-sharing between the United States and Ukraine.

In the summer of 2014, Brennan faced scrutiny after it was revealed that some CIA employees had improperly accessed the computer servers of the Senate Intelligence Committee in the wake of oversight of the CIA's role in enhanced interrogation and extraordinary rendition. Brennan apologized to Senators and stated that he would "fight for change at the CIA", and stated he would pass along the findings of the Inspector General on the incident. After the incident, Senator Mark Udall (D-Colo.) stated he had "lost confidence in Brennan".

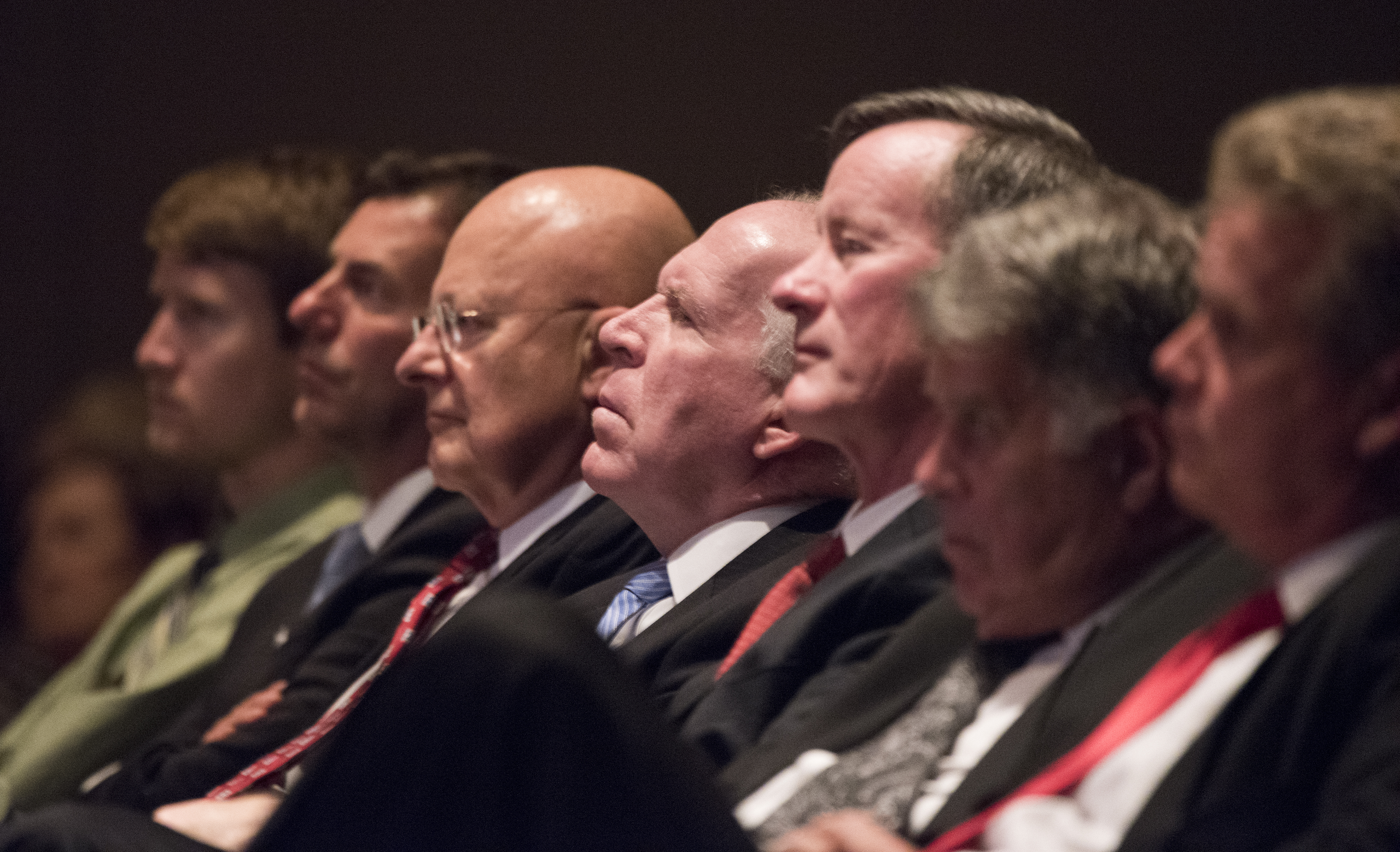
Brennan and James Clapper at the LBJ Presidential Library, September 16, 2015

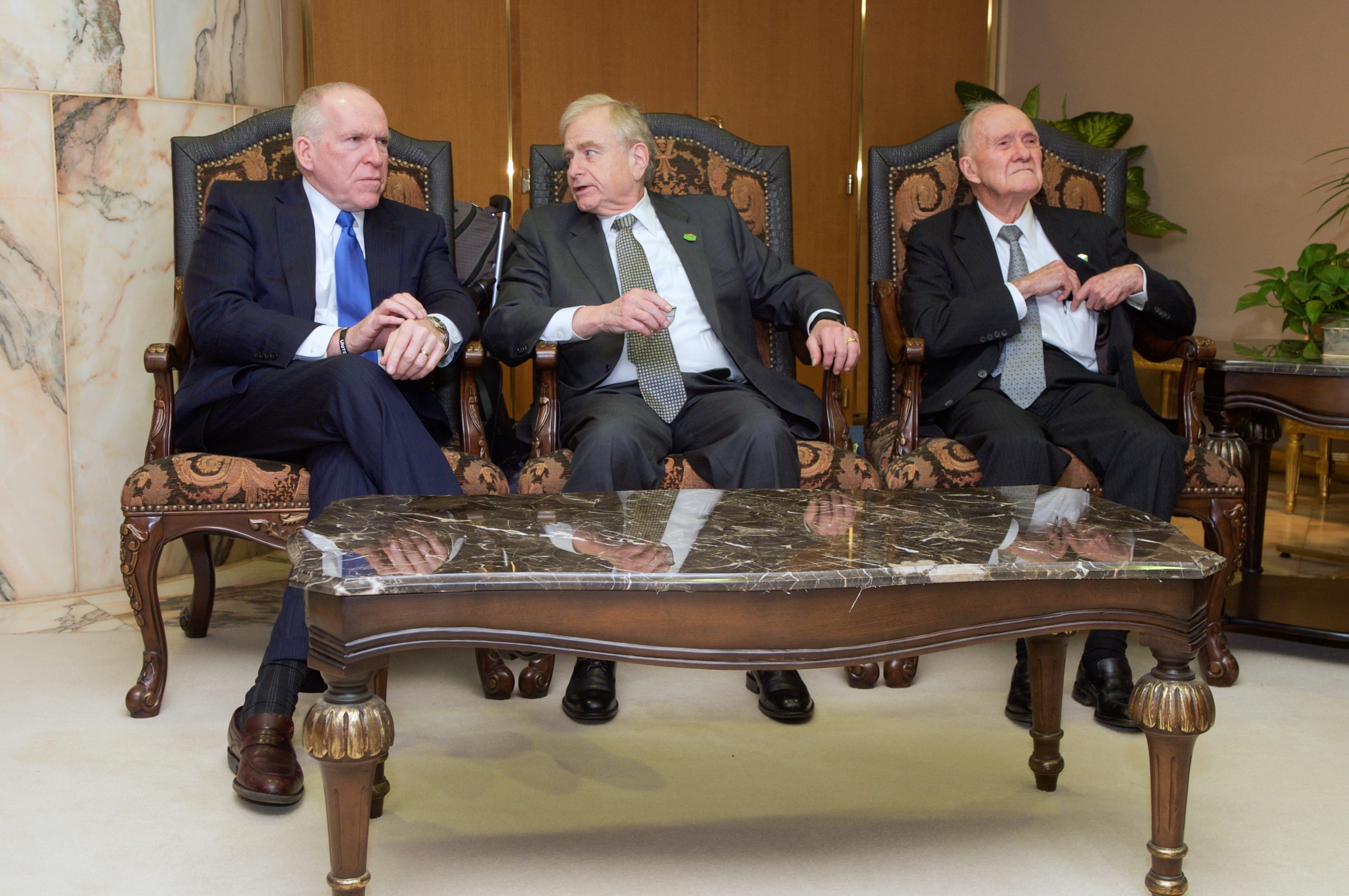
Brennan and former National Security Advisers Sandy Berger and Brent Scowcroft in Riyadh, Saudi Arabia, 2015

In December 2014, Brennan again came under fire when he defended the CIA's past interrogation tactics as having yielded "useful" intelligence, during a news conference. While admitting that the actions of the CIA officers were "abhorrent", worthy of "repudiation", and had, at times, exceeded legal boundaries Brennan stated the CIA had also done "a lot of things right during this difficult time to keep this country strong and secured".

During testimony to the Senate Intelligence Committee in June 2016, Brennan warned of the threat posed by ISIL claiming it had the ability to draw on a "large cadre of Western fighters" and reiterated the threats posed by lone wolf attackers, calling them "an exceptionally challenging issue for the intelligence community". Brennan detailed ISIL's size to the committee, specifying they had more fighters than al-Qaeda at its height and that they were spread between Africa and southwest Asia.

In September 2016, the Congress passed the Justice Against Sponsors of Terrorism Act (JASTA) that would allow relatives of victims of the September 11 attacks to sue Saudi Arabia for its government's alleged role in the attacks. Congress overwhelmingly rejected President Barack Obama's veto. Brennan warned of the JASTA bill's "grave implications for the national security of the United States."

While director, Brennan created ten new "mission centers" in his campaign to focus the CIA on threats in cyberspace, where analysts and hackers work in teams with focuses on specific areas of the globe and particular issues. In addition, he created the Directorate for Digital Innovation (DDI) to hone the Agency's tradecraft in the information technology sector and create new tools dedicated to cyber-espionage. Despite general praise for his actions from within the intelligence community about Brennan's shift towards cyber, some CIA officials said they held reservations in moving away from traditional human intelligence. In January 2017, Brennan, alongside FBI director James Comey, NSA director Mike Rogers, and Director of National Intelligence James Clapper briefed President-elect Donald Trump in Trump Tower on the findings of the intelligence community in regards to Russian election interference and the allegations contained in the Steele dossier.

British security hacker Kane Gamble, sentenced to two years in youth detention, posed as CIA chief to access highly sensitive information and hacked into Brennan's private email and iCloud accounts, made hoax calls to his family home and even took control of his wife's iPad. The judge said Gamble engaged in "politically motivated cyber terrorism."

Less than a week before Brennan left office in January 2017, he expressed several criticisms of incoming President Trump. Brennan said "I don't think he has a full appreciation of Russian capabilities, Russia's intentions and actions that they are undertaking in many parts of the world." Brennan stated that it was "outrageous" that Trump was "equating the intelligence community with Nazi Germany".

== WikiLeaks hack ==
In October 2015, the contents of Brennan's personal AOL e-mail account were stolen by a hack and posted on WikiLeaks. The e-mails did not contain classified information but did include sensitive personal information, including a draft of Brennan's Standard Form 86 (SF-86) application. During a subsequent security conference at George Washington University, Brennan proclaimed his "outrage" at the hack but also demonstrated the need to "evolve to deal with these new threats and challenges". In January 2017, a North Carolina college student pleaded guilty in a Virginia federal court to charges relating to hacking Brennan's e-mail. The two North Carolina men eventually pleaded guilty to a conspiracy with a group that called itself "Crackas With Attitude" to commit unauthorized computer intrusions, identity theft, and telephone harassment. Justin Gray Liverman was sentenced to five years in federal prison and Andrew Otto Boggs was sentenced to two years. Other co-conspirators were located in the United Kingdom and were prosecuted by the Crown Prosecution Service.

== Criticism of President Trump ==
Brennan helped establish the FBI’s counterintelligence investigation of Donald Trump’s campaign, which included the use of foreign intelligence, during the period leading up to the 2016 presidential election. Since leaving office, Brennan has been harshly critical of President Trump. In March 2018, Brennan said Trump had "paranoia", accused him of "constant misrepresentation of the facts", and described him as a "charlatan". Following the firing of FBI Deputy Director Andrew McCabe later that month, Brennan tweeted to Trump:

When the full extent of your venality, moral turpitude, and political corruption becomes known, you will take your rightful place as a disgraced demagogue in the dustbin of history. You may scapegoat Andy McCabe, but will not destroy America... America will triumph over you.

Axios quoted Brennan tweeting a response to Trump's harsh comments about James Comey: "Your kakistocracy is collapsing after its lamentable journey... we have the opportunity to emerge from this nightmare stronger & more committed to ensuring a better life for all Americans, including those you have so tragically deceived. On July 16, 2018, Brennan tweeted his reaction to Trump's comments at the 2018 Helsinki summit meeting with Russian president Vladimir Putin:

John O. Brennan
(@JohnBrennan)
tweeted:

Donald Trump's press conference performance in Helsinki rises to & exceeds the threshold of "high crimes & misdemeanors". It was nothing short of "treasonous". Not only were Trump's comments "imbecilic", he is wholly in the pocket of Putin. Republican Patriots: Where are you???

July 16, 2018

Trump responded by calling Brennan a "total lowlife". Brennan was also the target of a mailed pipe bomb incorrectly addressed to "John Brenan", as were multiple other Democratic lawmakers, officials, and critics of Trump.

In December 2018, Brennan tweeted that Trump should prepare for the "forthcoming exposure of your malfeasance & corruption." One day after the release of the Barr letter in March 2019, Brennan said on MSNBC:

Well, I don't know if I received bad information, but I think I suspected there was more than there actually was. I am relieved that it's been determined there was not a criminal conspiracy with the Russian government over our election...I still point to things that were done publicly, or efforts to try to have conversations with the Russians that were inappropriate, but I’m not all that surprised that the high bar of criminal conspiracy was not met.

The Barr letter was criticized by many as deceptive after the release of the Mueller report weeks later, with Mueller writing to Barr that the letter “did not fully capture the context, nature, and substance” of Mueller’s work.

On September 25, 2025, the day Comey was indicted, Trump suggested he might also indict Brennan.

=== Security clearance revocation ===
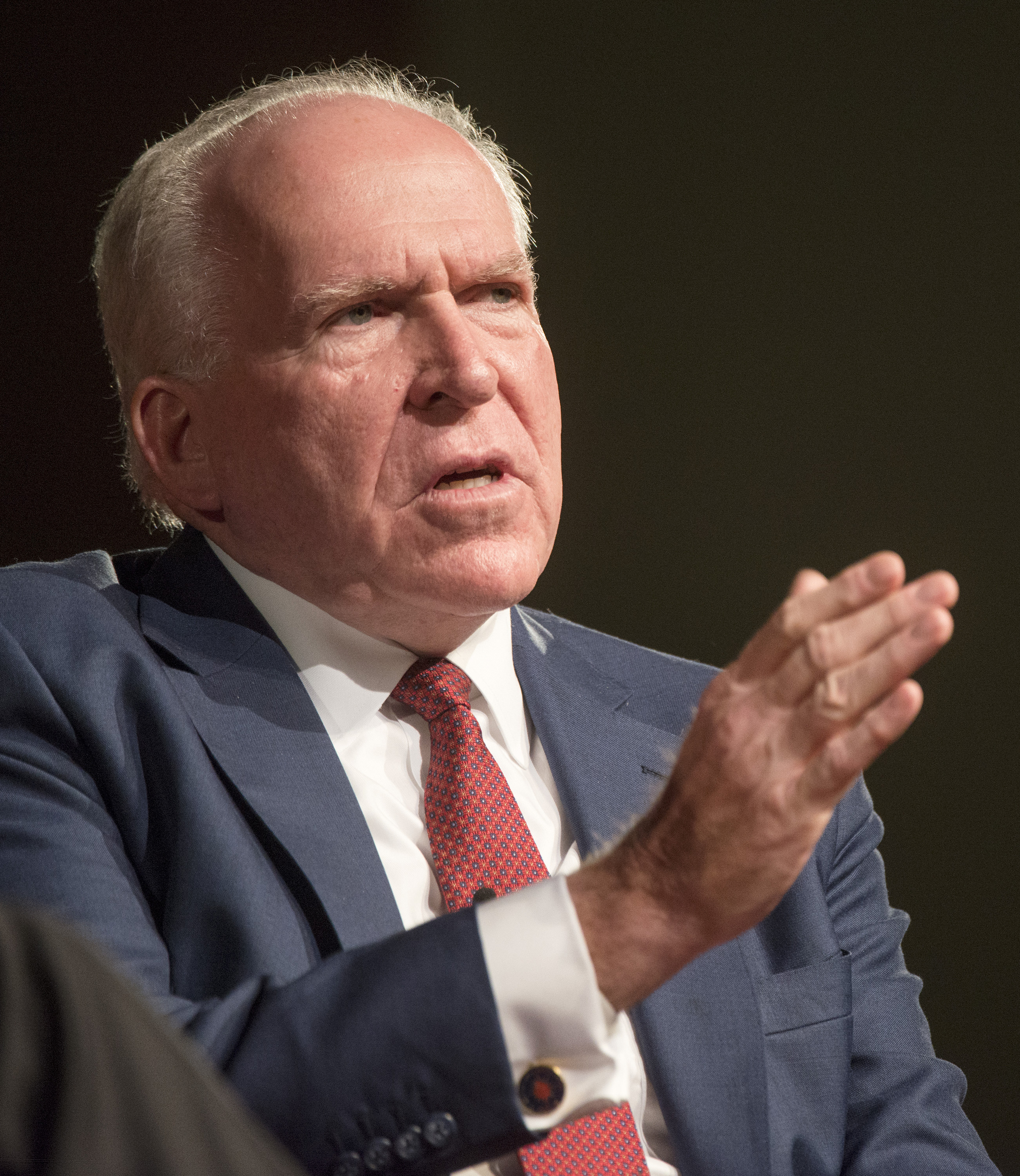
Brennan at the LBJ Presidential Library, October 24, 2018

In a tweet on July 23, 2018, Senator Rand Paul accused Brennan of making money from his security clearance and he called for Brennan's clearance to be revoked. Adding in a second tweet, Paul said, "Today I will meet with the President and I will ask him to revoke John Brennan's security clearance!" Later, at a press conference on that date, White House Press Secretary Sarah Huckabee Sanders told reporters that President Trump was considering removing the clearances of several of Obama's intelligence officials, including Brennan, saying, "The president is exploring the mechanisms to remove security clearance because they politicize and in some cases monetize their public service and security clearances."

On July 26, 2018, Huckabee Sanders read a statement from President Trump announcing he would revoke Brennan's security clearance, and on August 15, 2018, Sanders announced the revocation, but it never happened. She read a statement from Trump, dated July 26, that said Brennan's "lying and recent conduct, characterized by increasingly frenzied commentary, is wholly inconsistent with access to the nation's most closely held secrets and facilitates the very aim of our adversaries, which is to sow division and chaos". The statement said further, that Brennan had "recently leveraged his status as a former high-ranking official with access to highly sensitive information to make a series of unfounded and outrageous allegations – wild outbursts on the internet and television – about this Administration".

On August 16, Brennan stated that Trump's claims of no collusion with Russia were "hogwash":

The only questions that remain are whether the collusion that took place constituted criminally liable conspiracy, whether obstruction of justice occurred to cover up any collusion or conspiracy, and how many members of 'Trump Incorporated' attempted to defraud the government by laundering and concealing the movement of money into their pockets.

Following the revocation announcement, 15 former senior intelligence officials and 60 other high-ranking former CIA officers protested the Trump decision in an open letter saying, "... former government officials have the right to express their unclassified views on what they see as critical national security issues without fear of being punished for doing so." Calling Brennan "one of the finest public servants I have ever known," retired Navy admiral William H. McRaven addressed President Trump in an op-ed saying, "I would consider it an honor if you would revoke my security clearance as well, so I can add my name to the list of men and women who have spoken up against your presidency."

In an extensive interview on August 17, Brennan responded to Trump's decision to remove his security clearance, expressing alarm for the nation's national security in the statement:

[the country] is in a crisis in terms of what Mr. Trump has done and is liable to do. Are the Republicans on the Hill who have given him a pass – are they going to wait for a disaster to happen before they actually find their backbones and spines to speak up against somebody who clearly, clearly, is not carrying out his responsibilities with any sense of purpose and common sense from the standpoint of national security?

On August 19, Brennan told the host of NBC's Meet the Press that he was considering legal action to prevent Trump from doing the same to others.

On May 25, 2019, The New York Times reported that the administration had never followed through on the bureaucratic process to revoke Brennan's clearance as the attempt was "hampered by aides who slow-rolled the president and by Justice Department officials who fought Mr. Trump, warning he was jeopardizing national security".

On January 20, 2025, Trump signed an executive order revoking the security clearances of Brennan and 50 other former intelligence officials who had signed a 2020 letter suggesting that emails from Hunter Biden's laptop had "all the classic earmarks of a Russian information operation." Brennan called the executive order "bizarre" and said Trump had "misrepresented the facts" about the letter's contents.

In September 2025, Axios reported that a Justice Department criminal investigation into Brennan had been complicated after Director of National Intelligence Tulsi Gabbard revoked the security clearances of potential witnesses. According to administration officials, the witnesses were key to prosecutors' efforts to prove that Brennan had improperly influenced a 2017 intelligence assessment about Russian interference and allegedly lied about it to Congress in 2023. Brennan denied any wrongdoing.

=== Durham investigation ===
In March 2019, attorney general Bill Barr appointed United States Attorney for the District of Connecticut John Durham to investigate the origins of the FBI Crossfire Hurricane investigation into Russian interference in the 2016 elections, which involved some Trump associates. In December 2019, The New York Times reported that Durham was specifically scrutinizing Brennan's role. Durham interviewed Brennan for eight hours on August 21, 2020, after which a Brennan advisor said Durham told Brennan he was not a subject or target of a criminal investigation, but rather a witness to events.

In 2026, the Justice Department investigation into Brennan expanded beyond allegations concerning him to examine potential criminal conduct by other former government officials involved in investigations of Donald Trump.

=== Hunter Biden emails ===
In October 2020, Brennan was one of a group of 51 former senior intelligence officials who released an open letter stating that the Hunter Biden laptop controversy "has all the classic earmarks of a Russian information operation". Portions of the laptop's contents have since been verified as authentic, and no such Russian linkage was found.

== Personal life ==
Brennan is married to Kathy Pokluda Brennan. Together they have three children. Raised Catholic, he is now agnostic.

== Books ==
- John O. Brennan (2020). Undaunted: My Fight Against America's Enemies, at Home and Abroad. New York: Celadon Books. ISBN 9781250241771. (Available 10/06/2020)

Government offices
New office	Director of the National Counterterrorism Center; Acting; 2004–2005	Succeeded by John Redd
Preceded by Michael Morell; Acting	Director of the Central Intelligence Agency; 2013–2017	Succeeded by Meroe Park; Acting
Political offices
Preceded by Ken Wainstein	Homeland Security Advisor; 2009–2013	Succeeded by Lisa Monaco
