= Meroe Park =

American intelligence official (born 1966)

Meroë Park
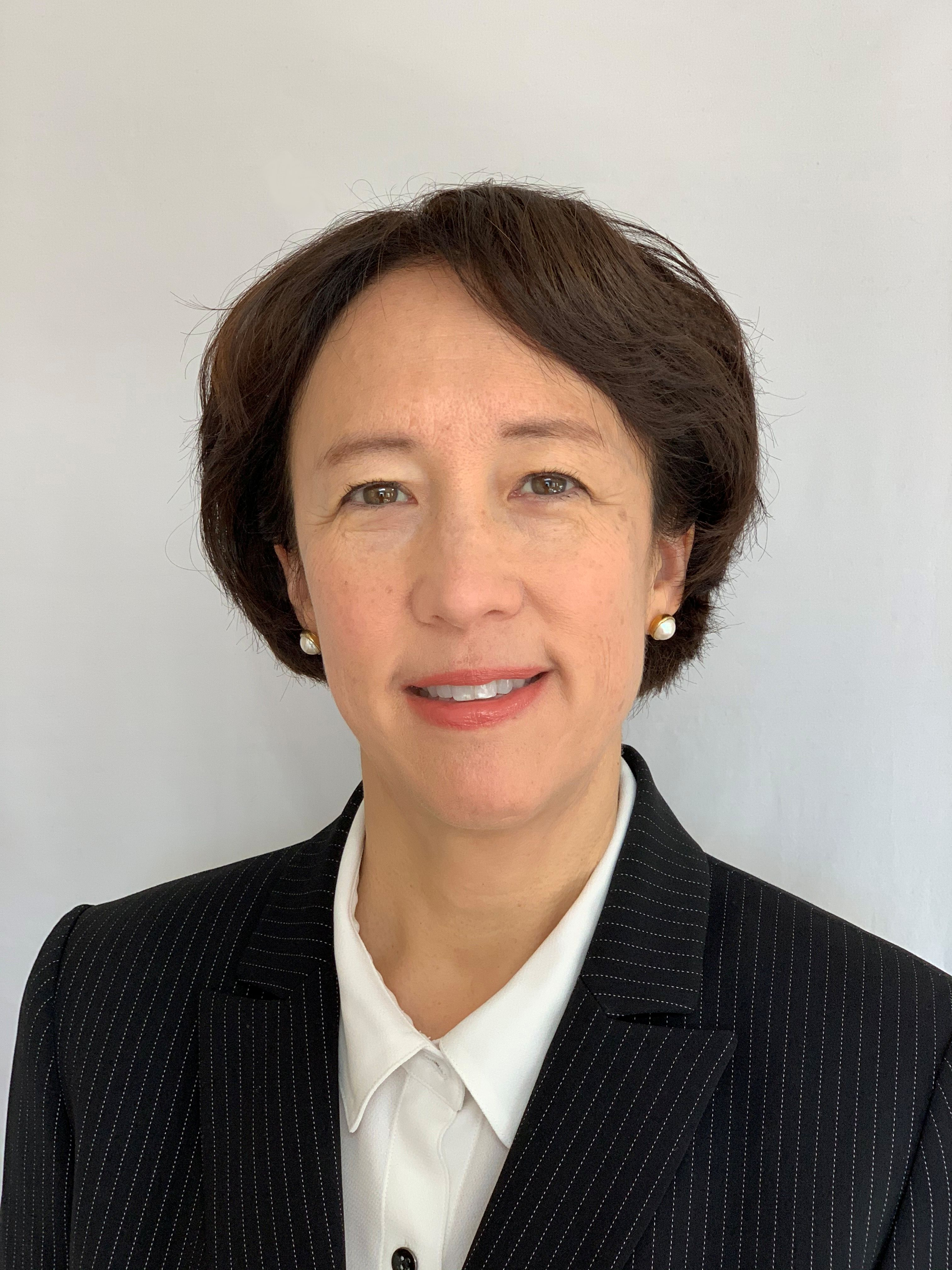

Director of the Central Intelligence Agency
- Acting
- In office January 20, 2017 – January 23, 2017
- President: Donald Trump
- Preceded by: John O. Brennan
- Succeeded by: Mike Pompeo

Personal details
- Born: December 1, 1966 (age 59) Eugene, Oregon, U.S.
- Children: 2
- Education: Georgetown University (BSc)

Meroë Park (born December 1, 1966) is an American former intelligence official who served as executive director of the Central Intelligence Agency (CIA) from 2013 to 2017. Prior to Mike Pompeo's confirmation, she briefly served as Acting Director of the Central Intelligence Agency in 2017. On January 27, 2020, she became Deputy Secretary and Chief Operating Officer of the Smithsonian Institution.

== Early life ==
Park was born to Korean-born professor Kwangjai Park and Marcia Sherman in Eugene, Oregon and raised there. She graduated from Georgetown University (BSc).

== Career ==
Park worked at the CIA for 27 years, during which she served as Chief of Human Resources, Director of Corporate Resources for Analysis, Chief of Payroll, and as a senior mission support officer for locations in Eurasia and Western Europe. During her career, she received two Presidential Rank Awards. After serving as executive director and briefly as acting director, she retired from the intelligence community in June 2017.

After leaving the CIA, Park became Non-executive Director at the Bank of Butterfield in October 2017. Bank of Butterfield is a Bermuda-based banking and wealth management firm which operates on Bermuda, the Cayman Islands, Guernsey and in the United Kingdom. She also became Executive Vice President of the nonprofit Partnership for Public Service, where she oversees the different programs of that organization and its work with federal agencies. In February 2018, she was named a Distinguished Executive-in-Residence at Georgetown University. In December 2019, Park was appointed deputy secretary and chief operating officer of the Smithsonian Institution. She is responsible for supervising 6,000 employees at 19 museums, 21 libraries, nine research centers and the National Zoo.

Government offices
Preceded by John O. Brennan	Director of the Central Intelligence Agency; Acting; 2017	Succeeded by Mike Pompeo
