= National Security Medal =

United States award

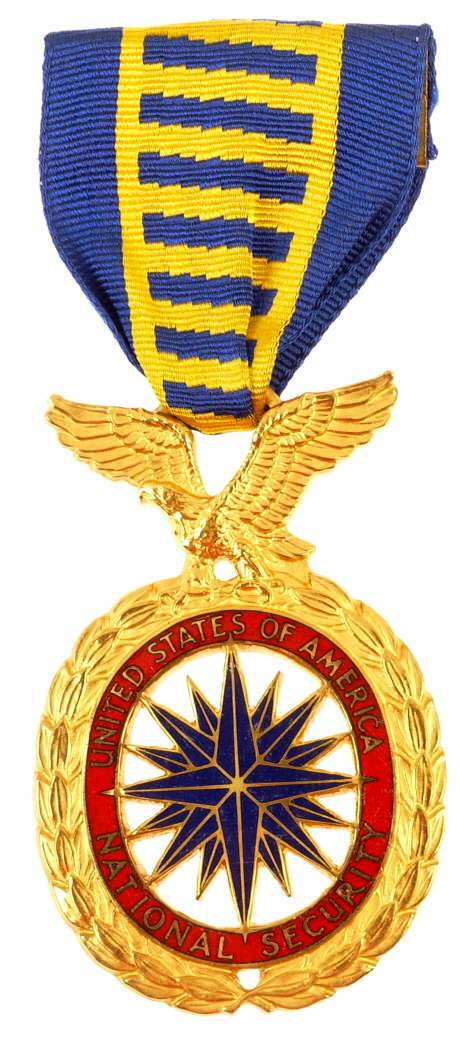
- National Security Medal
- Type: Individual Award
- Status: Active
- Final award: December 23, 2020
- National Security Ribbon

Precedence
- Equivalent: National Intelligence Distinguished Service Medal

The National Security Medal is a decoration of the United States of America officially established by President Harry S. Truman in Executive Order 10431 of January 19, 1953. The medal was originally awarded to any person, without regard to nationality, for distinguished achievement or outstanding contribution on or after July 26, 1947, in the field of intelligence relating to the national security of the United States.

On October 2, 2015, President Barack Obama amended Executive Order 10431 to award the medal to any person for distinguished achievement or outstanding contribution made in the field of national security through either exceptionally meritorious service performed in a position of high responsibility or through an act of heroism requiring personal courage of a high degree. Two additional sections were added to the original order. Any individual may recommend a potential recipient as a candidate for the award to the Executive Secretary of the National Security Council. If the Executive Secretary of the National Security Council determines that the medal is warranted and following approval by the President, the Executive Secretary shall notify the Office of the Director of National Intelligence who will then process the award recommendation, prepare the medal and deliver it to the National Security Council for presentation to the recipient.

The National Security Medal is authorized to both civilians and personnel of the United States military and is an authorized decoration for display on active duty uniforms of the United States armed forces. In such cases, the National Security Medal is worn after all U.S. military personal decorations and unit awards and before any military campaign/service awards and foreign decorations.

Additional decorations of the National Security Medal are denoted by a bronze oak leaf cluster.

== Notable recipients ==
- Avi Berkowitz
- William Joseph Donovan
- Allen Dulles
- David M. Friedman
- William F. Friedman
- Robert Gates
- Richard Grenell
- Michael Hayden
- Richard Helms
- J. Edgar Hoover
- Lawrence R. Houston
- Clarence Leonard Johnson
- Jared Kushner
- Edward Lansdale
- John McCone
- Steven Mnuchin
- Robert O'Brien
- Mike Pompeo
- John Rakolta
- John Scott Redd
- Kermit Roosevelt Jr.
- Frank Rowlett
- Wendy Sherman
- Walter Bedell Smith
- William O. Studeman
- William H. Webster
- John T. Hughes

== See also ==
- Awards and decorations of the United States government
