= Avi Berkowitz =

American attorney and political adviser (born 1988)

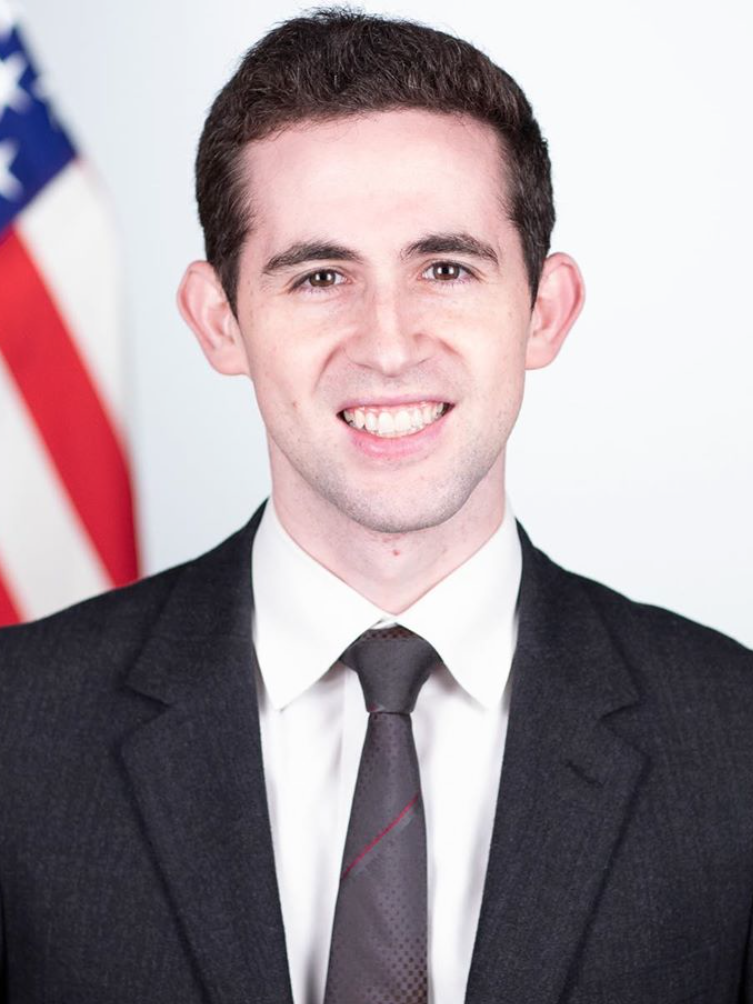
- Official portrait, 2019

Special Representative for International Negotiations
- In office November 1, 2019 – January 20, 2021
- President: Donald Trump
- Preceded by: Jason Greenblatt

Personal details
- Born: November 4, 1988 (age 37)
- Party: Republican
- Education: Queens College (BA); Harvard Law School (JD)
- Awards: National Security Medal, Department of Defense Medal for Distinguished Public Service, Order of Ouissam Alaouite

Avrahm Berkowitz (born November 4, 1988) is an American attorney and political adviser who served as the Assistant to the President and Special Representative for International Negotiations from 2019 to 2021. He was an advisor to Jared Kushner in the Trump administration, and worked on the Trump peace plan and the Abraham Accords.

== Education and early career ==
Avrahm Berkowitz grew up in Lawrence, New York. He attended Yeshiva of Far Rockaway, an Orthodox Jewish high school. After graduation, he studied at Kol Torah, an Orthodox yeshiva in Jerusalem. In 2009, he returned to the United States and enrolled in Yeshivas Ner Yisroel in Baltimore. Eventually, he transferred to Queens College, where he finished his undergraduate work and received a Bachelor of Arts degree. Afterwards, he attended Harvard Law School ('16).

During law school, Berkowitz taught undergraduate classes, including one called “Road to the White House,” years before he would campaign for Donald Trump. While a student, Berkowitz met Jared Kushner playing basketball in Phoenix. After he graduated from Harvard Law School, he went to work for the Trump 2016 presidential campaign.

== Career ==
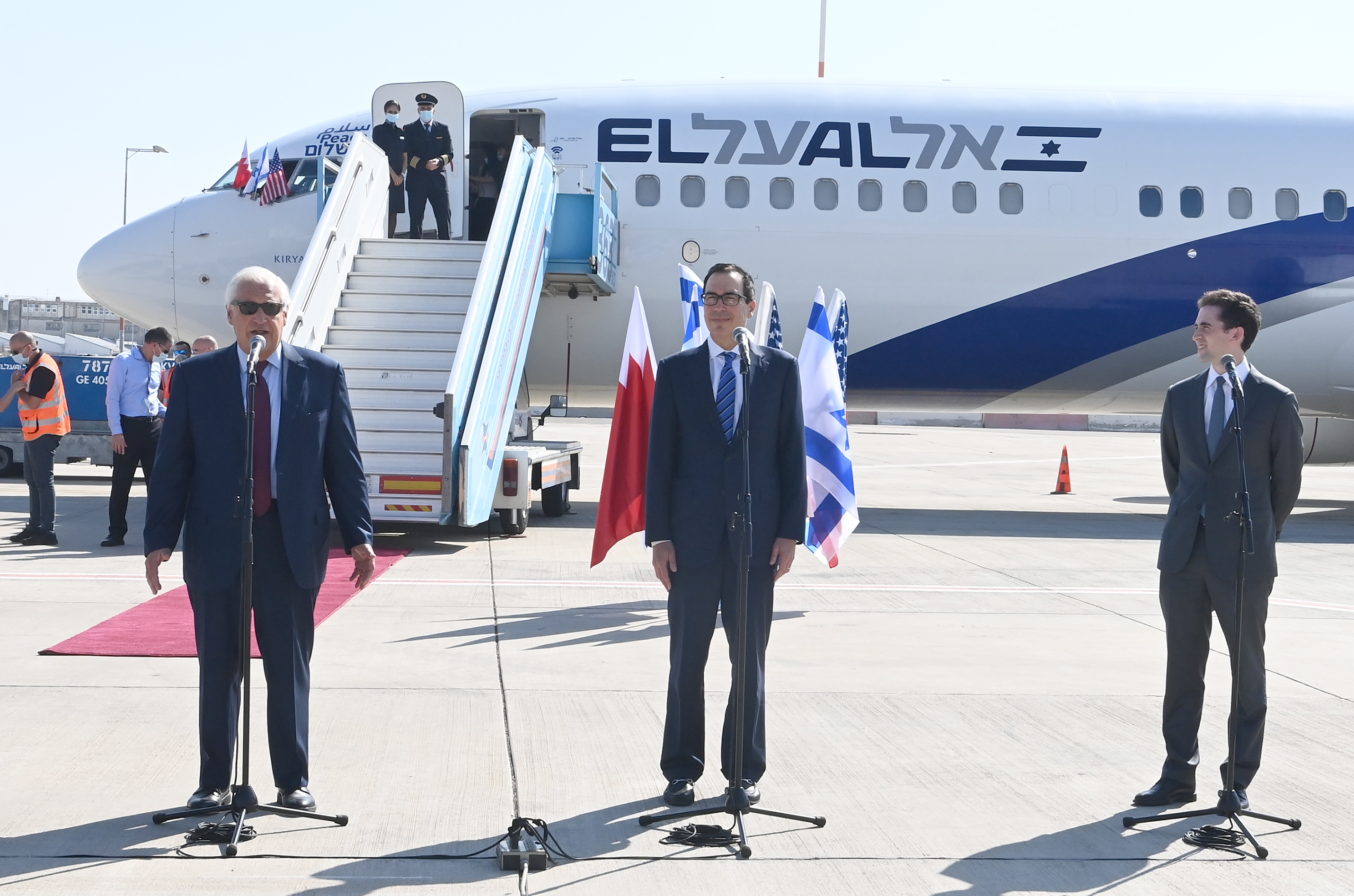
Berkowitz alongside Steve Mnuchin and David M. Friedman

Prior to serving in the White House, Berkowitz worked for Kushner at his company, Kushner Companies. He also briefly worked as a writer for the New York Observer, owned by Jared Kushner.

=== Donald Trump presidential campaign (2016) ===
Berkowitz was assistant director of data analytics for the Trump campaign. He also directed Trump Tower Live, a Facebook Live talk show which The New York Times characterized as “essentially agitprop [political propaganda] presented as news.”

=== Executive Office of the President ===
Once Donald Trump was sworn in as president, Berkowitz joined the White House as "Special Assistant to the President and Assistant to the Senior Adviser" on Jan 20, 2017. On September 6, 2018, Berkowitz's title changed to "Deputy Assistant to the President and Advisor to the Senior Advisor."

=== Special Representative for International Negotiations ===
On September 5, 2019, the Trump Administration announced that Jason Greenblatt would be departing in the coming weeks, and that Avi Berkowitz would become more involved in the Middle East peace process. On November 1, 2019, Berkowitz was promoted to Assistant to the President and Special Representative for International Negotiations.

In January 2020, Berkowitz flew to Israel to meet with Prime Minister Netanyahu and Benny Gantz to discuss the possibility of releasing the Trump peace plan.

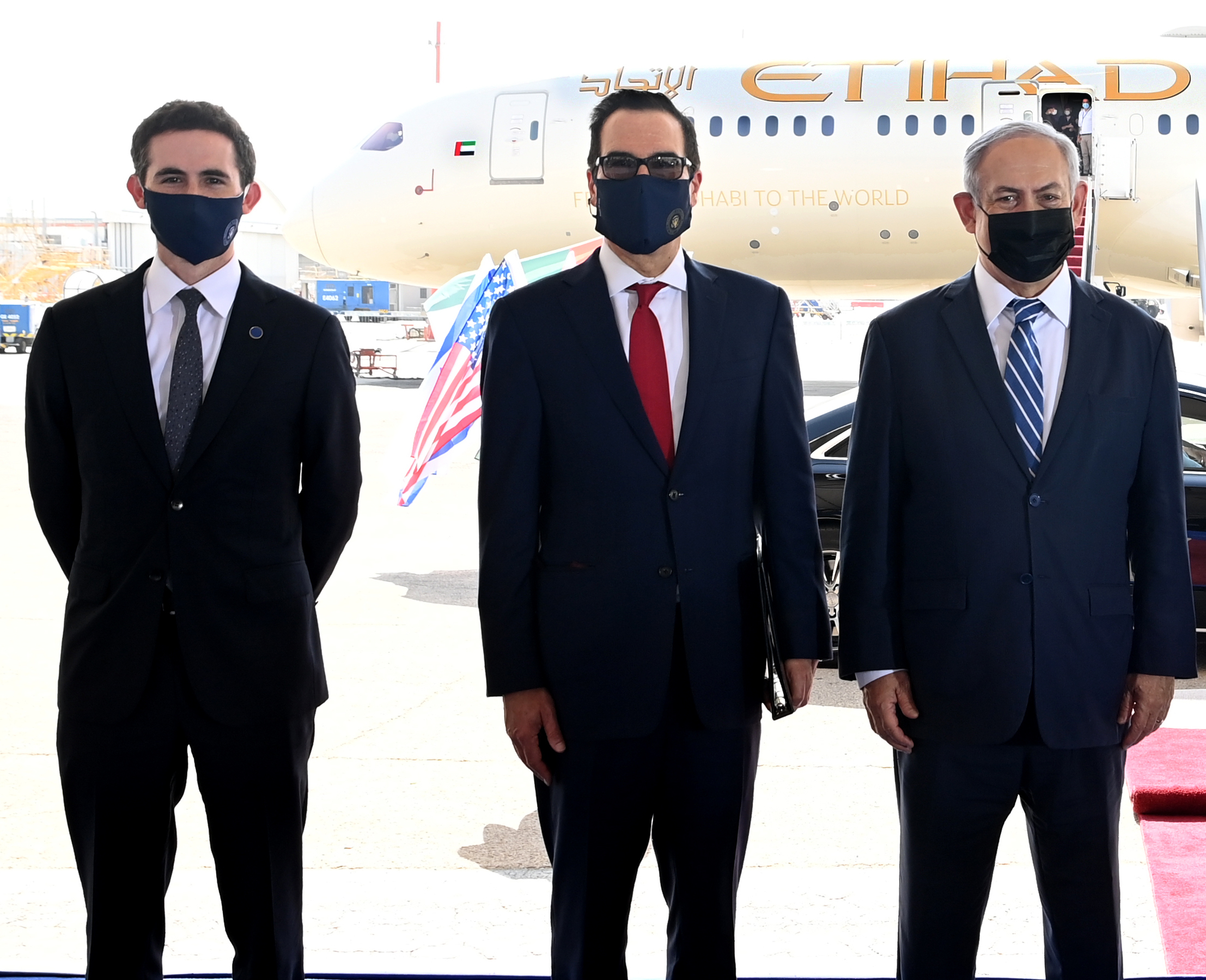
Berkowitz alongside Steve Mnuchin and Benjamin Netanyahu

On January 28, 2020, the Trump Administration unveiled the plan in a ceremony at the White House. A component of the plan envisioned applying Israeli law or annexation to roughly 30% of the West Bank. On June 12, 2020, UAE Ambassador, Yousef Al Otaiba authored an op-ed in an effort to halt Israel's planned annexation of West Bank territory. Otaiba's op-ed was addressed to the Israeli public and published on the front page of Yedioth Ahronoth. The White House had reservations about annexation as well, which Berkowitz discussed with Netanyahu in meetings in Israel over three days in late June, 2020. In the meetings Berkowitz proposed an alternative to annexation, normalization with the United Arab Emirates.

On July 2, 2020, Otaiba met with Berkowitz to further discuss an alternative plan to annexation. Along with a mutual interest in creating a unified front against the opposing forces of Iran, the concerns detailed in Otaiba's op-ed and planning with Jared Kushner and Berkowitz helped bring vested parties to the negotiating table to identify an alternative solution, ultimately resulting in a normalization agreement reached in August 2020. As a component of the deal annexation was postponed.

On October 23, 2020 Israel and Sudan agreed to normalize ties, making Sudan the third Arab country to set aside hostilities in two months. The agreement was negotiated on the U.S. side by Trump senior adviser Jared Kushner, Middle East envoy Avi Berkowitz, national security adviser Robert O’Brien, Secretary of State Mike Pompeo and national security official Miguel Correa.

On December 10, 2020, President Trump announced that Israel and the Kingdom of Morocco agreed to establish full diplomatic relations. The agreement was negotiated by Trump senior adviser Jared Kushner and Middle East envoy Avi Berkowitz and marked Kushner and Berkowitz's fourth normalization agreement in as many months. As a component of the deal, the United States agreed to recognize Moroccan sovereignty over the Western Sahara.

On November 30, 2020 Kushner and Berkowitz traveled to Saudi Arabia for negotiations on the Qatar diplomatic crisis. The next day, Kushner continued to Qatar, but left Berkowitz in Saudi Arabia so the duo could continue to mediate the deal between the Saudis and the Qataris over the phone in real time. The negotiations led to a breakthrough, and on January 5, 2021, Kushner and Berkowitz attended the GCC Summit in Saudi Arabia, where the parties signed an agreement ending the Qatar diplomatic crisis.

== Honors ==
On September 28, 2019, Berkowitz was named one of the top 50 most influential Jews of 2019 by the Jerusalem Post for his role as Special Representative in the Middle East peace process. In September 2020, Berkowitz, Jared Kushner and other members of the team that negotiated the Israel–United Arab Emirates normalization agreement, were named the most influential Jews of 2020 by the Jerusalem Post.

On December 23, 2020, Berkowitz was awarded the National Security Medal by President Trump for his contributions to the Abraham Accords, which saw normalization agreements between Israel, the UAE, Bahrain, Sudan and Morocco. Berkowitz, at 32 upon receipt, is the youngest known recipient of the award.

On January 15, 2021, King Mohammed VI of Morocco awarded Berkowitz the grade of Grand Officer of the Order of Ouissam Alaouite. In the same week Berkowitz also received the Department of Defense Medal for Distinguished Public Service for his role in negotiating the Abraham Accords.

== Policy influence ==
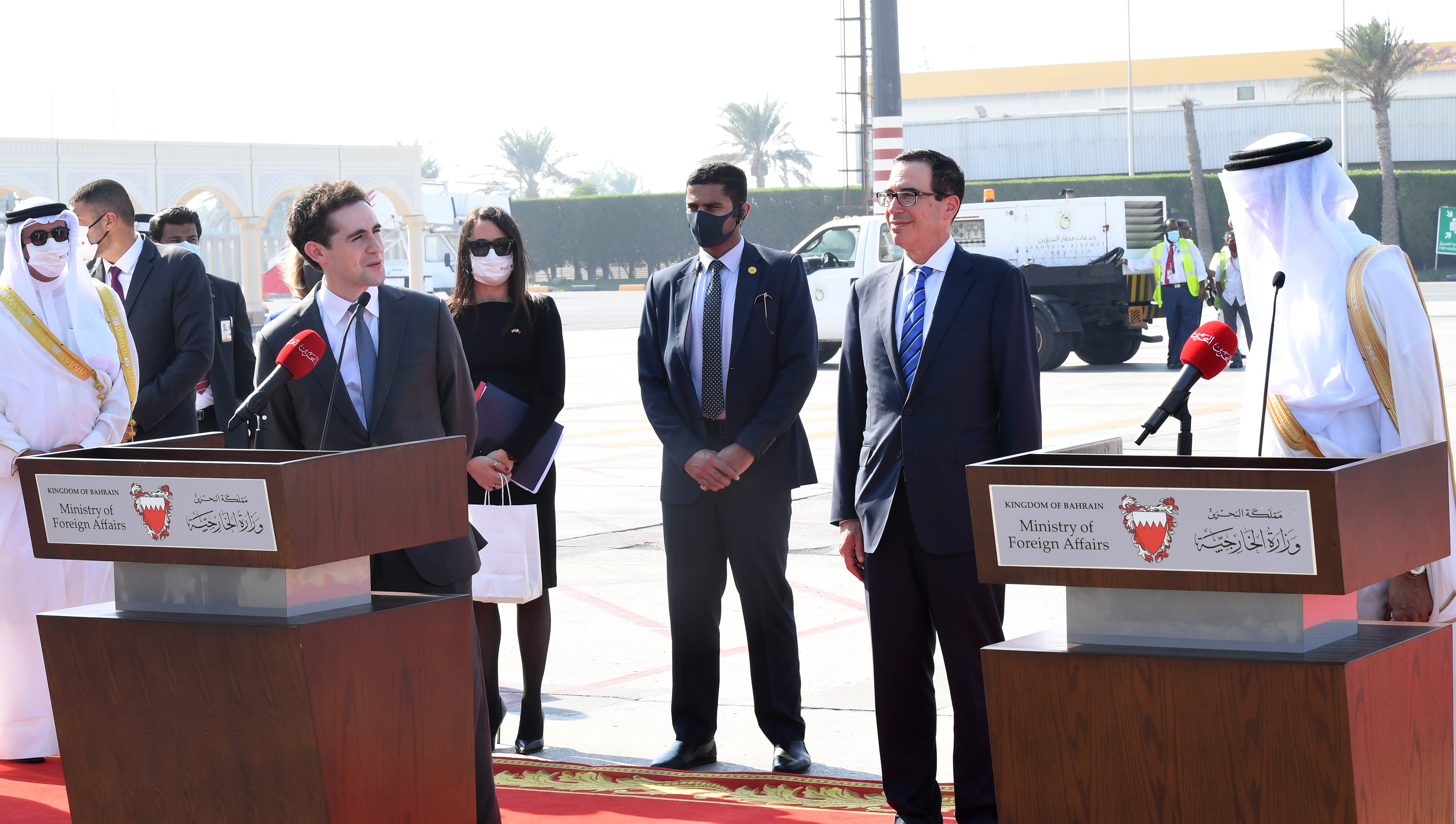
Berkowitz speaking in Bahrain in 2020

=== Middle East peace plan ===
In 2019, White House advisers Jared Kushner and Jason Greenblatt wrote a Middle East peace plan. It was kept a secret within the White House staff, with access limited to four people, one of whom was Berkowitz.

In February 2019, Berkowitz flew with Kushner to six countries (Oman, Bahrain, Qatar, the United Arab Emirates, Turkey and Saudi Arabia) in order to unveil a new closely guarded plan to bring peace to the Middle East.

=== U.S. embassy in Israel ===
Berkowitz also played a key role in the U.S. decision to move its embassy in Israel to Jerusalem.

=== Prison sentencing reform ===
Kushner led the White House effort to pass the First Step Act, legislation to reform prison sentencing. Kushner won “bipartisan praise for driving a 20-year effort to reform prison sentencing and criminal justice to the finish line and ignoring repeated declarations that it was dead . . .” Kushner hand-picked Berkowitz and only two other White House aides as part of his team to pass the legislation.
