= National security of the United States =

National security of the United States is a collective term encompassing the policies of both U.S. national defense and foreign relations.

== Elements of policy ==
Measures taken to ensure U.S. national security include:

- Using diplomacy to rally allies and isolate threats.
- Marshaling economic power to elicit cooperation.
- Maintaining effective armed forces.
- Implementing civil defense and emergency preparedness policies (including anti-terrorism legislation)
- Ensuring the resilience and redundancy of critical infrastructure.
- Using intelligence services to detect and defeat or avoid threats and espionage, and to protect classified information.
- Tasking counterintelligence services or secret police to protect the nation from internal threats.

== U.S. Constitution ==
The phrase "national security" entered U.S. political discourse as early as the Constitutional Convention. The Federalist Party argued that civilian control of the military required a strong central government under a single constitution. Alexander Hamilton wrote: “If a well-regulated militia be the most natural defense of a free country, it ought certainly to be under the regulation and at the disposal of that body which is constituted the guardian of the national security.”

== Organization ==
U.S. national security organizations have remained largely stable since U.S. president Harry S. Truman signing of the National Security Act of 1947 and its subsequent 1949 amendment, which includes:

- Creation of the National Military Establishment (NME) which became known as the Department of Defense when the act was amended in 1949
- Formation of a separate Department of the Air Force from the existing United States Army Air Forces
- Subordinating military branches to the new Secretary of Defense
- Establishing the National Security Council to coordinate national security policy in the Executive Branch
- Chartering the Central Intelligence Agency

== Civil liberties ==
Following the September 11 attacks in 2001, the passage of the USA Patriot Act provoked debate about the alleged restriction of individual rights and freedoms for the sake of U.S. national security. The easing of warrant requirements for intelligence surveillance, under Title II of the Act, spurred the NSA warrantless surveillance controversy. In August 2008, the United States Foreign Intelligence Surveillance Court of Review (FISCR) affirmed the constitutionality of warrantless national security surveillance.

== See also ==
- National security § United States
- National Security Medal
- National Security Advisor
- Deputy National Security Advisor
- Anti-terrorism legislation
- Computer insecurity
- Homeland security
- Nuclear deterrence
- Terrorism in the United States
