= The Analysis Corporation =

American intelligence company (1990–2012)

- Company type: Private
- Industry: National security and Counterterrorism
- Founded: 1990
- Defunct: 2012
- Successor: Sotera Defense Solutions; Global Strategies Group; GTEC
- Headquarters: McLean, Virginia, US
- Website: theanalysiscorp.com at the Wayback Machine (archived 2008-02-28)

The Analysis Corporation (TAC) was a national security and counterterrorism company from 1990 to 2012. It supported national watchlisting activities as well as other counterterrorism requirements.

== History ==
TAC was founded in 1990 by Cecilia nmi Hayes, previous owner and partner in Analytic Methods Inc. (AMI) and current owner of TAC Commercial Services (TCS) and Nations Home Group. In 2004, TAC was purchased by SFA and maintained as a wholly owned subsidiary. Ms. Hayes remained president of TAC into 2005. In November 2005, John O. Brennan was appointed president and CEO of TAC. Mr. Brennan was the former interim director of the National Counterterrorism Center and a 25-year veteran of the CIA.

In January 2009, Brennan was selected by President Barack Obama to serve in his administration as Homeland Security Adviser and Deputy National Security Adviser for Counterterrorism. Due to his strong ties to TAC, he required a special ethics waiver in order to lead the investigation into the intelligence failures surrounding the Underwear Bomber terrorist attack. In March 2013, Brennan was appointed director of the Central Intelligence Agency.

Following Brennan's departure in October 2008 as advisor to then-presidential candidate Barack Obama, Alexander Drew became the acting president of TAC. Drew was named president in January 2009 and remained through February 2012, when TAC was dissolved and assimilated into Sotera Defense Solutions, formerly SFA, Global Strategies Group (North America), and GTEC.

== Cooperation ==
GTEC's Intelligence Solutions business, which is staffed by other former senior officials from the Intelligence community, operates within almost every entity in the Intelligence Community including the US Department of State, Department of Homeland Security (DHS), Federal Bureau of Investigation (FBI), and Defense Intelligence Agency (DIA).

== Key areas ==
Prior to 9/11, TAC was instrumental in providing pattern recognition and data mining software applications that served as the basis for the US Government's original terrorist watchlist database called TIPOFF. In 2003, TAC assisted the Government in standing up the Terrorist Screening Center (TSC) the Terrorist Threat Integration Center (TTIC), and its successor, the National Counterterrorism Center (NCTC). Key practice areas included intelligence and Federal Law Enforcement support for terrorist screening, watchlist development and operations; intelligence analysis; systems integration and software development; multilingual name search; and pattern matching. It was awarded over $400m in government contracts since 2000, including some $30.6m in 2007, $19.5m in 2008, and $150m in 2009. Customers included the Department of State, National Targeting Center (NTC), Defense Intelligence Agency (DIA), National Security Agency (NSA), Office of Naval Intelligence (ONI), NCTC, TSC, and the FBI.

== Passport info scandal ==
In early 2008 TAC found itself in the midst of a scandal when a State Department spokesman revealed that a TAC contractor, formerly a retired State Department employee, gained unauthorized access on March 14 to the passport records for Barack Obama and John McCain. The TAC employee, who has not been named, is the only individual to have accessed both Obama's and McCain's passport information without proper authorization, a State Department spokesman said. The employee's actions triggered an electronic alarm system, according to sources familiar with the probe. TAC strongly disavowed the employee's actions in a subsequent press release.

== See also ==
- Airport security
- Civil defense
- High policing
- Infrastructure security
- Military-Industrial Complex
- Port security
- Supply chain security
- Terrorism in the United States
