= John Scott Redd =

United States Navy vice admiral and government official

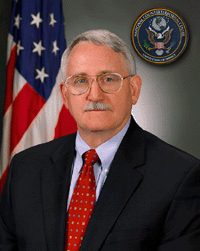
- Born: September 10, 1944 (age 82); Sidney, Iowa
- Military career
- Branch: United States Navy
- Service years: 1966–1998
- Rank: Vice Admiral
- Commands: United States Fifth Fleet
- Awards: National Security Medal; National Intelligence Distinguished Service Medal; Defense Distinguished Service Medal (three awards); Navy Distinguished Service Medal (two awards); Defense Superior Service Medal (three awards); Legion of Merit (two awards); Meritorious Service Medal (two awards); Navy Commendation Medal (two awards); OSD Exceptional Public Service; Order of Bahrain
- Other work: Deputy Administrator, Coalition Provisional Authority; Executive Director, Iraq Intelligence Commission; Director, National Counterterrorism Center

1st Director of the National Counterterrorism Center
- In office August 1, 2005 – November 10, 2007
- Preceded by: John O. Brennan (interim)
- Succeeded by: Michael Leiter (acting)

John Scott Redd (born September 10, 1944) is a retired vice admiral of the United States Navy, and afterward the first Senate-confirmed Director of the National Counterterrorism Center, serving from 2005 until 2007. He was President of the Naval Academy Class of 1966 and has served on the advisory boards of several non-profit organizations. An avid amateur radio operator, Redd has won twelve world championships and nine national championships.

== Naval career ==
Redd was born in Sidney, Iowa, and graduated from the United States Naval Academy in the class of 1966. A Trident Scholar, he graduated second in his class, majoring in mathematics and physics. Following graduation, he studied as a Fulbright Scholar in Uruguay and as a Burke Scholar, receiving a Master of Science degree in Operations Analysis from the Naval Postgraduate School. He also attended the Program for Senior Executives at the Massachusetts Institute of Technology (MIT).

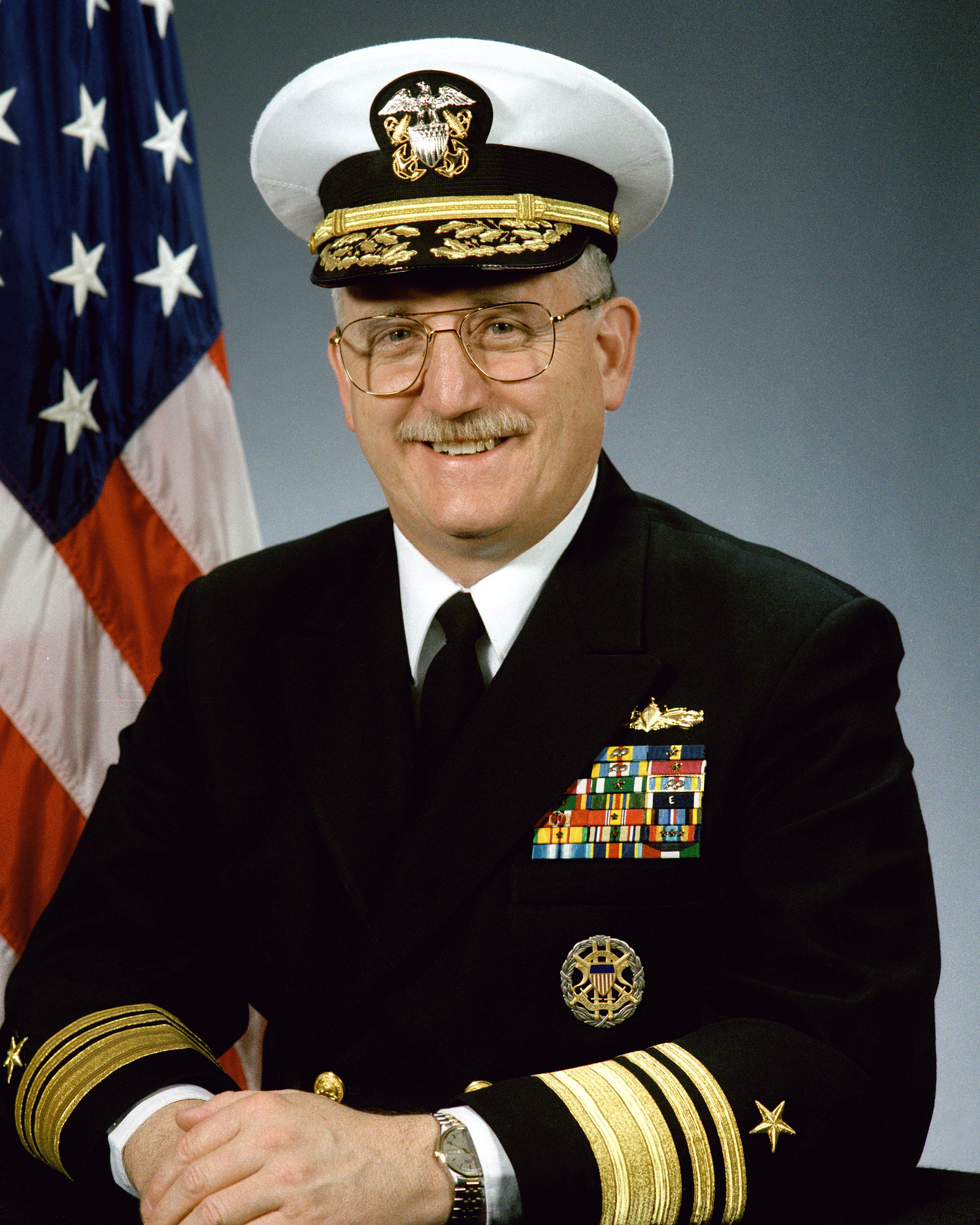
Vice Adm. Redd in 1998

During his 36 years of active duty service he commanded eight organizations at sea including a ship and Cruiser-Destroyer Group 12, an aircraft carrier battle group and served in several senior policy positions in the Pentagon. In 1995, he proposed and founded the only new U.S. Navy Fleet in half a century, serving as the first Commander, Fifth Fleet (COMFIFTHFLT) since World War II. His last assignment on active duty was as Director of Strategic Plans and Policy (DJ-5) on the Joint Staff. Redd retired from active military service in 1998.

== Post-Navy career ==
Following his retirement from the Navy he served as CEO of NetSchools Corp., a high-tech start-up company in the education sector, headquartered in Silicon Valley and Atlanta, Georgia.

In early 2004 Redd was appointed deputy administrator and chief operating officer (COO) of the Coalition Provisional Authority (CPA) in Baghdad, Iraq. Redd, was one of two deputy administrators reporting to L. Paul Bremer, and directed programs for the reconstruction of Iraq's infrastructure. He was also responsible for policy affecting Iraq's security programs, including the new Iraqi Army, the Iraqi Civil Defense Corps, Iraqi Border Patrol and Facilities Protection Services.

Redd then served as executive director for the Commission on the Intelligence Capabilities of the United States Regarding Weapons of Mass Destruction, sometimes known as the WMD Intelligence Commission. The commission's report was adopted as the president's blueprint for implementation of Intelligence Community reform.

In 2005, Redd was nominated by President George W. Bush, confirmed by the Senate, and sworn in by Vice President Richard B. Cheney as the first Director of the National Counterterrorism Center. The NCTC has two core missions; to serve as the primary organization in the U.S. Government for analysis and integration of all terrorism intelligence, and to conduct strategic operational planning (SOP) for counterterrorism activities integrating all elements of U.S. national power. As Director of NCTC, Redd was responsible for preparing the National Implementation Plan, the first U. S. Government war plan for the global war on terror. The plan was approved by the President on June 26, 2006.

In a letter to the Intelligence Community dated 17 October 2007, Redd announced his intention to step down as Director of the NCTC, effective 10 November 2007. He cited medical concerns and the desire to spend more time with his family as reasons for his resignation. He subsequently underwent double knee replacement surgery.

== Awards ==
Lifetime Service Awards

Presidential Award

• National Security Medal - Presented by President George W. Bush for lifetime Service in National Security, Redd was only the 56th recipient in the award's 60-year history. Previous recipients include the founders of the WWII Office of Strategic Services (OSS), the FBI and the CIA (2009). Redd was recognized by the President for "his more than 40 years of exceptional service to the Nation strengthening its intelligence capabilities and improving national security."

United States Naval Academy

On March 22, 2013, VADM Redd was honored as the 62nd recipient of the Naval Academy's Distinguished Graduate Award in a presentation in Alumni Hall at the United States Naval Academy in Annapolis.

. "The Honorable John S. Redd, Class of 1966, served in the surface warfare community following graduation from the Academy. He retired as a vice admiral, having commanded eight organizations at sea, including founding the first new fleet in half a century, United States Fifth Fleet in the Middle East; served as Deputy Administrator and Chief Operating Officer of the Coalition Provisional Authority in Iraq; and was selected by President George W. Bush to serve as the first Senate-confirmed director of the National Counterterrorism Center (NCTC). He has served as president of his Naval Academy class, as well as on the Naval Academy Alumni Association Board of Trustees."

Selected Personal Service Awards

Defense Department

• Defense Distinguished Service Medal (three awards) - Chief of Staff/Assistant to the Undersecretary of Defense for Policy (1991); Commander, Naval Forces Central Command, Combined Task Force, Mogadishu, Somalia (1995); Director, Strategic Plans and Policy (DJ-5), the Joint Staff (1998)

• Navy Distinguished Service Medal (two awards) - Acting and Assistant Deputy Chief of Naval Operations (DCNO) for Plans, Policy and Operations (N-3/5, N-3/5B) (1994); Commander, U. S. Naval Forces Central Command (COMUSNAVCENT) and Commander, FIFTH Fleet (COMFIFTHFLT) (1996)

• Defense Superior Service Medal (three awards) - Military Assistant to the Under Secretary of Defense for Policy (USDP) (1986); Commander, Standing Naval Forces, Atlantic (COMSNFL) (1989); Assistant Deputy Chief of Naval Operations for Plans, Policy, and Operations (N-3/5B); Military Working Group (1993)

• Legion of Merit (two awards) - Commander, Destroyer Squadron Thirty Six (COMDESRON 36) (1988); Commander Cruiser-Destroyer Group TWELVE (CCDG-12) / Commander, EISENHOWER Battle Group (1992)

• Meritorious Service Medal (two awards) - Chief of Naval Operations Executive Panel (1980); Commanding Officer, USS KING (DDG-41) (1983)

• Navy Commendation Medal (two awards) - USS EDWARD MCDONNELL (FF-1043) (1970); Commander, Destroyer Squadron Thirty Six (COMDESRON 36) (1986)

Intelligence Community Awards

• National Intelligence Distinguished Service Medal - Director, National Counterterrorism Center (NCTC) (Nov. 7, 2007)

Defense Department Award – Civilian

• OSD Exceptional Public Service - Deputy Administrator and Chief Operating Officer (COO) of the Coalition Provisional Authority (CPA), Baghdad, Iraq (2004)

Foreign Award

• Order of Bahrain - Commander, U. S. Naval Forces Central Command (COMUSNAVCENT) and Commander, FIFTH Fleet (COMFIFTHFLT) (1996)

Other awards

On June 13, 2006, the Fremont County Board of Supervisors resolved to name the new bypass highway around Sidney, Iowa, the "Admiral Scott Redd Highway" in his honor. Dedication ceremonies were held on October 5, 2007..

== Amateur radio ==
On May 16, 2008, Redd was inducted into the CQ Amateur Radio Hall of Fame, which honors those individuals, whether licensed hams or not, who have made significant contributions to amateur radio; and those amateurs who have made significant contributions either to amateur radio, to their professional careers or to some other aspect of life on our planet.

In August 2009, Redd "became perhaps the only person ever to win single-op world championships in all six major ham radio DX contests." said CQWW Contest Director Bob Cox, K3EST, in announcing the results, which were published in the September issue of CQ magazine. Redd, operating from Mexico as XE1IIJ in the early 1970s, won single-op world championships in the CQWW Phone Contest, the ARRL DX Phone and CW Contests and the CQ WPX Phone Contest. Thirty years later, when his professional life permitted a little more hamming time, Scott added the WPX CW crown as P41P, operating from P43P's station in Aruba, in 2002. The only prize that eluded him—until now—was the CQWW CW. To date, he has also won twelve World Championships and nine National Championships including two all-time world records in major international contests.

On May 16, 2014, CQ Magazine announced its 2014 Contest Hall of Fame inductees which included Scott Redd, K0DQ. Redd "is already a member of the CQ Amateur Radio Hall of Fame for his service to our nation as a US Navy Vice Admiral, Deputy Administrator of the Coalition Provisional Authority in Iraq, and the first Director of the National Counterterrorism Center. Scott has always found time within his professional duties for Amateur Radio and his first love, contesting. He is one of only two people to have won the Single-Operator category of all of the world's major contests."

Redd, along with current Coast Guard Chief Warrant Officer Dave Mueller, NetApp CEO Tom Georgens, retired Navy Adm. Edmund Giambastiani, the former vice chairman of the Joint Chiefs of Staff, was featured in the Wall Street Journal July 11, 2014, "For These Vets, Amateur Radio Remains Alive," the Boston Globe July 17, 2014, "Ham radio operators of the world face off in Westborough, and NPR Making Contact In The 'Olympics' Of Ham Radio on August 9, 2014, when he took part in the World Radiosport Team Championship 2014.

Government offices
Preceded by John O. Brennan	Director of the National Counterterrorism Center; 2005–2007	Succeeded by Michael E. Leiter
