= Steele dossier =

Political opposition research report regarding the 2016 US election

Steele Dossier (p. 1)

The Steele dossier, also known as the Trump–Russia dossier, is a controversial political opposition research report on the 2016 presidential campaign of Donald Trump compiled by counterintelligence specialist Christopher Steele. It was published without permission in 2017 as an unfinished 35-page compilation of "unverified, and potentially unverifiable" (Note: BuzzFeed said the information included "specific, unverified, and potentially unverifiable allegations of contact between Trump aides and Russian operatives".) memos that were considered by Steele to be "raw intelligence – not established facts, but a starting point for further investigation". The dossier was written from June to December 2016 as reports from his sources were received, and contains allegations of misconduct, conspiracy, and cooperation between Trump's presidential campaign and the government of Russia prior to and during the 2016 election campaign. U.S. intelligence agencies have reported that Vladimir Putin personally ordered the whole Russian election interference operation, that the Russians codenamed Project Lakhta.

While the dossier played a significant role in initially highlighting the general friendliness between Trump and the Putin administration, the corroboration status of specific allegations is highly variable. The following allegations have been publicly corroborated by U.S. intelligence agencies, the January 2017 ODNI report, and the Mueller report: "that the Russian government was working to get Mr. Trump elected"; (Note: "Parts of the dossier have proved prescient. Its main assertion – that the Russian government was working to get Mr. Trump elected – was hardly an established fact when it was first laid out by Mr. Steele in June 2016. But it has since been backed up by the United States' own intelligence agencies – and Mr. Mueller's investigation. The dossier's talk of Russian efforts to cultivate some people in Mr. Trump's orbit was similarly unknown when first detailed in one of Mr. Steele's reports, but it has proved broadly accurate as well.") that Russia sought "to cultivate people in Trump's orbit"; that Trump campaign officials and associates had secretive contacts with Russian officials and agents; that Putin favored Trump over Hillary Clinton; that Putin personally ordered an "influence campaign" to harm Clinton's campaign and to "undermine public faith in the US democratic process"; and that he ordered cyberattacks on both parties. Some other allegations are plausible but not specifically confirmed, and some lack evidence and are considered dubious.

The dossier was based on reports from initially anonymous sources known to Steele and his "primary sub-source", Igor Danchenko. Steele, a former head of the Russia Desk for British intelligence (MI6), wrote the report for the private investigative firm Fusion GPS, that was paid by Hillary Clinton's campaign and the Democratic National Committee (DNC). The dossier's 17 reports allege that there was a "well-developed conspiracy" of "cooperation" between Trump campaign members and Russian operatives to aid Russia's election interference efforts to benefit Trump. It also alleges that Russia sought to damage Hillary Clinton's candidacy. It was published by BuzzFeed News on January 10, 2017, without Steele's permission. Their decision to publish the reports without verifying the allegations was criticized by journalists. However, a judge defended BuzzFeed's action on the basis that the dossier was part of an official proceeding, and therefore "protected by fair reporting privilege".

Generally, when the dossier was released with its "explosive, but largely unverified, claims", "former intelligence officers and other national-security experts" urged "skepticism and caution". While compiling the dossier, Steele passed his findings to both British and American intelligence agencies. The U.S. intelligence community took the allegations seriously, and the Federal Bureau of Investigation (FBI) investigated every line of the dossier and identified and spoke with at least two of Steele's sources. The Mueller report contained passing references to some of the dossier's allegations but little mention of its more sensational claims. Both the 2019 OIG report and the 2023 Durham report raised doubts about the dossier's reliability and sources, with the latter stating that "the FBI was not able to corroborate a single substantive allegation contained in the Steele Reports".

While the dossier played a central and essential role in the seeking of FISA warrants on Carter Page, according to James Clapper, John Brennan, and Robert S. Litt, it "played no role" in the January 6, 2017, intelligence community assessment of the Russian actions in the 2016 election, and according to the Senate Intelligence Committee, the dossier was not used to "support any of [the assessment's] analytic judgments". Also, it was not the trigger for the opening of the Russia investigation into whether the Trump campaign was coordinating with the Russian government's interference in the 2016 presidential election. The dossier is a factor in several conspiracy theories promoted by Trump and his supporters. Many mainstream sources have described the dossier as "discredited". (Note: "discredited")

== History ==
Glenn Simpson and Peter Fritsch of private intelligence firm Fusion GPS hired Steele in May 2016, initially paying him $30,000 for a month's work.

=== Two research operations ===
Prior to the work with Steele, The Washington Free Beacon, a conservative news outlet, funded research into multiple Republican candidates, including Trump. From October 2015 to May 2016, they hired Fusion GPS to investigate Trump's domestic business and entertainment activities. This was based on public sources and investigative reporter Wayne Barrett's files. Despite some media reports, this was not connected to the dossier information.

From April to December 2016, the Clinton campaign and the Democrats hired Fusion to investigate Trump's Russian connections. They subcontracted the work to Steele and Orbis Business Intelligence, which produced the eponymous dossier.

==== The Washington Free Beacon operation does not produce the dossier ====
In October 2015, before the official start of the 2016 Republican primary campaign, the founders of Fusion GPS were seeking political work and wrote an email to "a big conservative donor they knew who disliked Trump, [and] they were hired". He arranged for them to use The Washington Free Beacon, an American conservative political journalism website, for their general opposition research on several Republican presidential candidates, including Trump. It is primarily funded by Republican donor Paul Singer. The Free Beacon and Singer were "part of the conservative never-Trump movement". Although Singer was a big supporter of Marco Rubio, Rubio denied any involvement in Fusion GPS's initial research and hiring.

This phase used public sources, but early in their investigation, they also received help from Wayne Barrett who gave them his files on Trump. They contained findings about "Trump's past dealings, including tax and bankruptcy problems, potential ties to organized crime, and numerous legal entanglements. They also revealed that Trump had an unusually high number of connections to Russians with questionable backgrounds."

By April 2016, Fusion was investigating Trump, Paul Manafort and Russian oligarch Oleg Deripaska, paid for by the Beacon. Steele had also hired Fusion to investigate Manafort, unrelated to politics, for a law firm asset recovery case. When Trump became the presumptive Republican nominee in May, the conservative donor stopped funding the research on him. Fritsch had, since March, been courting another possible client from the other side of the aisle.

The dossier itself and the research within was not funded by the Free Beacon.

By the spring of 2016, researchers at Fusion GPS had become so alarmed by what they had already learned about Trump that they felt the need "to do what they could to keep Trump out of the White House".

==== Democratic Party operation produces dossier ====
===== Hiring and initial reports =====
The second operation of opposition research was indirectly funded by the Democratic National Committee and the Clinton campaign, working through their attorney of record, Marc Elias of Perkins Coie. In an October 2017 letter, Perkins Coie general counsel Matthew Gehringer described how, in March 2016, Fusion GPS approached Perkins Coie and, knowing the Clinton campaign and the DNC were its clients, inquired whether its clients wished to pay Fusion GPS "to continue research regarding then-presidential candidate Donald Trump, research that Fusion GPS had conducted for one or more other clients during the Republican primary contest." In April 2016, Elias hired Fusion GPS to perform opposition research on Trump.

Simpson had some reservations, as he did not like the idea of helping Hillary Clinton. In an email, Simpson said, "The only way I could see working for HRC is if it is against Trump."

Steele was former British intelligence. Prior to and during his engagement with Simpson, Steele had been a paid confidential human source (CHS) for the FBI for information unrelated to the Russia investigation.

The DNC and Clinton campaign paid Perkins Coie $12.4 million during the 2016 campaign. This led Trump to inflate the cost of the dossier to $12 million. According to Fusion GPS, Perkins Coie paid them $1.02 million in fees and expenses, and Fusion GPS paid $168,000 to Steele's firm, Orbis Business Intelligence, to produce the dossier. Despite that, Trump and his son Donald Trump Jr. continued to claim for more than a year that Steele was paid "millions of dollars" for his work.

Orbis was hired between June and November 2016, and Steele produced 16 reports during that time, with a 17th report added in December. The reports were like "prepublication notes" based on information from Steele's sources and were not released as a fully vetted and "finished news article". Steele believes 70–90 percent of the dossier is accurate.

Steele delivered numbered reports individually to Fusion GPS. The first report, dated June 20, 2016, was sent to Washington by courier and hand-delivered to Fusion GPS. The names of the sources were redacted and replaced with descriptions to help Fusion GPS judge their credibility.

Steele had more difficulty obtaining intelligence for the report in late July. Harding believes that sources felt pressure from the Kremlin in light of increased scrutiny of Trump's Russia ties.

===== Passing reports to intelligence agencies =====
Steele was troubled by the intelligence from his sources suggesting mutually beneficial information exchanges between the Trump campaign and Russians. Steele felt what he had unearthed had significance that transcended partisan politics. Howard Blum described Steele's rationale for becoming a whistleblower as an altruistic one.

Steele decided on his own to pass the information to British and American intelligence services, because he believed the findings were a matter of national security. In 2018, Steele told a UK parliamentary investigation that Theresa May's British government covered up the evidence he provided them of Trump's Russian ties and failed to act, and that Boris Johnson suppressed a report about it prepared by Parliament's Intelligence and Security Committee. After long delay, the report was published on July 21, 2020.

According to Simpson's testimony, Steele, who enjoyed a good working reputation "for the knowledge he had developed over nearly 20 years working on Russia-related issues for British intelligence, approached the FBI because he was concerned that Trump, then a candidate, was being blackmailed by Russia, and he became "very concerned about whether this represented a national security threat". Steele believed the intelligence community "needed urgently to know—if it didn't already—that the next possible U.S. president was potentially under the sway of Russia".

In early July 2016, Steele called seasoned FBI agent Michael Gaeta, who was stationed in Rome, and asked him to come to London so he could show him his findings. When he arrived in London on July 5, 2016, he met with Steele at his office, and he was given a copy of Steele's first report, dated June 20, 2016 (Report 80).

Shortly after, in July, the report was sent to an agent with expertise in criminal organizations and organized crime at the FBI's New York field office. According to Nancy LeTourneau, political writer for the Washington Monthly, the report "was languishing in the FBI's New York field office" for two months, and "was finally sent to the counterintelligence team investigating Russia at FBI headquarters in Washington, D.C." in mid-September 2016.

In October 2016, Steele "described the sources' access, but did not provide names" to the FBI. By August 22, 2017, Steele had provided them with the names of the sources for the allegations in the dossier.

Meanwhile, in the July to September time frame, according to The Washington Post, CIA Director John Brennan had started an investigation with a secret task force "composed of several dozen analysts and officers from the CIA, the NSA and the FBI". At the same time, he was busy creating his own dossier of material documenting that "Russia was not only attempting to interfere in the 2016 election, they were doing so in order to elect Donald Trump. ... [T]he entire intelligence community was on alert about this situation at least two months before [the dossier] became part of the investigation." The "Steele dossier has so far proven to be fairly accurate", LeTourneau wrote.

In the fall of 2016, Steele went to Rome and discussed the report with four FBI officials.

During its intense questioning of Steele, the FBI mentioned their own discoveries of connections between the Trump campaign and Russia and asked Steele about Papadopoulos, but he said he knew nothing about him. The agents "raised the prospect of paying Steele to continue gathering intelligence after Election Day", but Steele "ultimately never received payment from the FBI for any 'dossier'-related information". In October 2022, during questioning from Special Counsel John Durham, Brian Auten, a supervisory counterintelligence analyst with the FBI, testified that, shortly before the 2016 election, the FBI offered Steele "up to $1 million" if he could corroborate allegations in the dossier, but that Steele could not do so. Steele has disputed this description: "And to correct the Danchenko trial record, we were not offered $1 million by the FBI to 'prove up' our Trump-Russia reporting. Rather, we were told there were substantial funds to resettle sources in the US if they were prepared to testify in public. Understandably they were not."

===== After public release =====
The subsequent public release of the dossier in January 2017 stopped discussions between Steele and the FBI. The Inspector General's report later confirmed that the FBI had initially offered to pay Steele $15,000 for his trip to Rome, but when the FBI dropped Steele as a CHS because he had shared information with a third party "in late October 2016" (Mother Jones magazine), the payment was halted. Peter Strzok reported that:

the FBI closed Steele "because he was a control problem. We did not close him because we thought he was [a] fabricator." According to Strzok, Steele's decisions to discuss his reporting with the media and to disclose his relationship with the FBI were "horrible and it hurt what we were doing, and no question, he shouldn't have done it."

In September, Steele met with Jonathan Winer, who was then the U.S. deputy assistant secretary of state for international law enforcement, whom he had known since 2009. In a 2018 editorial for The Washington Post, Winer recounted that during their meeting in Washington, he was allowed to review Steele's reports, but not to keep a copy: "I prepared a two-page summary and shared it with [Victoria] Nuland, who indicated that, like me, she felt that the secretary of state needed to be made aware of this material", he wrote. Later in September, Winer discussed the report with Sidney Blumenthal, who revealed he had received similar information from Cody Shearer, a controversial political activist and former journalist who was close to the Clinton White House in the 1990s. Winer met with Steele again in late September and gave him a copy of Shearer's report, later known as the "second dossier".

On September 19, 2016, (Note: "On September 19, 2016, the Crossfire Hurricane team received the Steele reporting for the first time when Handling Agent 1 emailed SSA 1 six reports for SSA 1 to upload himself to the sub-file: Reports 80 and 94, and four additional reports (Reports 95, 100, 101, and 102) that Handling Agent 1 had since received from Steele. FBI officials we interviewed told us that the length of time it took for Steele's election reporting to reach FBI Headquarters was excessive and that the reports should have been sent promptly after their receipt by the Legat. Members of the Crossfire Hurricane team told us that their assessment of the Steele election reporting could have started much earlier if the reporting had been made available to them.") after the report had been "languishing in the FBI's New York field office" for two months, Steele's handling agent sent six of Steele's reports (80, 94, 95, 100, 101, and 102) to the Crossfire Hurricane team, that had been operational since July 31, 2016. This was the first time they and their leader, Deputy Assistant Director of the FBI's Counterespionage Section, Peter Strzok, received any of Steele's reporting. Strzok cautioned his colleagues: "[The dossier] 'should be viewed as intended to influence as well as to inform' and whoever commissioned it was 'presumed to be connected to the [Clinton] campaign in some way.'" Some reports referred to members of Trump's inner circle. After that point, he continued to share information with the FBI. The IG Report says this material "became an important part of the Crossfire Hurricane investigation and the FBI seeking FISA authority targeting one of the Crossfire Hurricane subjects, Carter Page".

On October 28, 2016, days before the election, Comey notified Congress that the FBI had started looking into newly discovered Hillary Clinton emails. Simpson and Fritsch described their reaction: "Comey's bombshell prompted the Fusion partners to decide they needed to do what they could to expose the FBI's probe of Trump and Russia. It was Hail Mary time." The founders of Fusion GPS were very upset by a misleading November 1, 2016, New York Times article "published a week before the election with the headline: 'Investigating Donald Trump, FBI Sees No Clear Link to Russia'. In fact, Russia was meddling in the election to help Trump win, the U.S. intelligence community would later conclude."

Simpson later said that "Steele severed his contacts with [the] FBI before the election following public statements by the FBI that it had found no connection between the Trump campaign and Russia and concerns that [the FBI] was being 'manipulated for political ends by the Trump people'." Steele had become frustrated with the FBI, whom he believed failed to investigate his reports, choosing instead to focus on the investigation into Clinton's emails. According to The Independent, Steele came to believe there was a "cabal" inside the FBI, particularly its New York field office linked to Trump advisor Rudy Giuliani, because it blocked any attempts to investigate the links between Trump and Russia. He "grew concerned that there was a cover-up in progress".

=== What the DNC, Clinton campaign, and Steele knew ===
According to Fusion GPS's co-owners, Glenn Simpson and Peter Fritsch, they did not tell Steele who their ultimate clients were, only that Steele was "working for a law firm", and they "gave him no specific marching orders beyond this basic question: 'Why did Mr. Trump repeatedly seek to do deals in a notoriously corrupt police state that most serious investors shun?'" In testimony to the Senate Intelligence Committee, Simpson said that "it was Fusion GPS's idea to pursue overseas ties—that research was not directed by Perkins Coie, the DNC, or the Clinton Campaign".

Jane Mayer reported that when the Clinton campaign "indirectly employed" Steele, Elias created a "legal barrier" by acting as a "firewall" between the campaign and Steele. Thus, any details were protected by attorney–client privilege and work-product privileges. "Fusion briefed only Elias on the reports, Simpson sent Elias nothing on paper—he was briefed orally", Mayer reported. In its application for a FISA warrant to survey Carter Page, the Department of Justice told the FISC that Simpson had not informed Steele of the motivation behind the research into Trump's ties with Russia. Steele testified to Congress that he did not know the Clinton campaign was the source of the payments "because he was retained by Fusion GPS". By "late July 2016", "several months" after signing the contract with Fusion GPS, Steele became aware that the DNC and the Clinton campaign were the ultimate clients.

A spokesperson for the DNC said neither Tom Perez nor "the new leadership of the DNC were ... involved in any decision-making regarding Fusion GPS, nor were they aware that Perkins Coie was working with the organization." A spokesperson for Perkins Coie said the campaign and the DNC were unaware Fusion GPS "had been hired to conduct the research". The Washington Post reported that it is not clear how much of the research Elias received from Fusion GPS he shared with the campaign and the DNC. It is also not clear who in those organizations knew about the roles of Fusion GPS and Steele, but one person "close to the matter" said the organizations were "not informed by the law firm of Fusion GPS's role". The New York Times revealed that earlier in 2017, "Mr. Elias had denied that he had possessed the dossier before the election." The Clinton campaign did not know about Steele or that he was sharing his findings with the FBI, and "one top Clinton campaign official" told Jane Mayer that "If I'd known the F.B.I. was investigating Trump, I would have been shouting it from the rooftops!"

The firewall was reportedly so effective even campaign principals John Podesta and Robby Mook did not know Steele was on the Democratic payroll until Mother Jones reported on the issue on October 31, 2016, in an article that did not name Steele. When the Mother Jones story broke, John Podesta, chairman of the Clinton campaign, said he was "stunned by the news that the FBI had launched a full-blown investigation into Trump, especially one that was informed by research underwritten by the Clinton campaign." Although they knew Perkins Coie had spent money for opposition research, neither Podesta nor campaign manager Robby Mook knew Steele was on the Democratic payroll. Mayer said they both maintain they "didn't read the dossier until BuzzFeed posted it online". When Donna Brazile, interim DNC chair, later heard rumors of the research on Russia, she asked Elias about it. According to Brazile, he brushed her off and said "You don't want to know." Mayer also said that "the Clinton campaign never learned that Christopher Steele was on their payroll until it [the dossier] was in the press." "Far from a secret campaign weapon, Steele turned out to be a secret kept from the campaign." In their 2019 book, the founders of Fusion GPS wrote "that no one from Fusion ever met or talked with Clinton and that she herself 'had no idea who they were'."

Philip Bump wrote that the dossier "has never been shown to have informed the Clinton campaign's approach and that was not made public until shortly before Trump was inaugurated."

On February 15, 2022, The Washington Post reported: "So far, there is no evidence that the Clinton campaign directly managed the Steele reporting or leaks about it to the media."

CBS News reported that "at no point did the Clinton campaign or DNC direct Steele's probe into the Trump campaign. A source confirmed to CBS News that Clinton only learned about the now-infamous 'Trump dossier' after BuzzFeed News posted it", and that the dossier "was never ultimately used".

=== Hints of existence ===
When Fusion GPS first hired Steele, "they thought that 'no one would ever find out' about the discreet work Steele would perform. That prediction proved naive", and the founders of Fusion GPS have described how they soon did not hide the fact that they were researching Trump and Russia: "Fusion and Steele tried to alert U.S. law enforcement and the news media to the material they'd uncovered. The firm's office in Washington's Dupont Circle neighborhood became 'something of a public reading room' for journalists seeking information about Trumpworld." In September they arranged private meetings at the Tabard Inn, in Washington, D.C., between Steele and reporters from The Washington Post, The New York Times, The New Yorker, ABC News, and other outlets. The meetings were "at staggered times, to ensure that the journalists didn't bump into one another". Jane Mayer attended one of the meetings. None of these news organizations ran any stories about the allegations at that time.

Although BuzzFeed was not invited to these meetings, Ben Smith, editor of BuzzFeed, wrote that "We were hardly the first journalists to get the document—but we may have been the first to get it without promising to keep it secret ... [the journalists at the Tabard Inn meetings] had promised Simpson that they wouldn't write about the dossier itself, its author, or its path through the American government, [and] they couldn't report on these things either." BBC correspondent Paul Wood was allowed to see "a dozen" pages of the dossier in October 2016.

Before the election, only two news sources mentioned allegations that came from dossier reports. Steele had been in contact with both authors. These were a September 23, 2016, Yahoo! News article by Michael Isikoff that focused on Carter Page, and an article by David Corn on October 31, 2016, a week before the election, in Mother Jones magazine.

At the time, the FBI had assumed that the source for the Yahoo! article was someone, other than Steele, "who had received a copy of the dossier". The 2019 DOJ report by Michael Horowitz criticized the FBI for failing to ask Steele if he had a role in that Yahoo! article.

==== Mother Jones story ====
By the third quarter of 2016, many news organizations knew about the existence of the dossier that had been described as an "open secret" among journalists but chose not to publish information they could not confirm. Mother Jones was the first to report the existence of the dossier and that it was exclusively funded by Democrats.

By October 2016, Steele had shared 33 pages of his reports with David Corn. A week before the election, Mother Jones reported that an unnamed former intelligence officer had compiled a report of information from Russian sources over to the FBI. The article disclosed some of the allegations:

The first memo, based on the former intelligence officer's conversations with Russian sources, noted, "Russian regime has been cultivating, supporting and assisting TRUMP for at least 5 years. Aim, endorsed by PUTIN, has been to encourage splits and divisions in western alliance." It maintained that Trump "and his inner circle have accepted a regular flow of intelligence from the Kremlin, including on his Democratic and other political rivals". It claimed Russian intelligence had "compromised" Trump during his visits to Moscow and could "blackmail him". It also reported that Russian intelligence had compiled a dossier on Hillary Clinton based on "bugged conversations she had on various visits to Russia and intercepted phone calls".

=== Post-election events ===
After Trump's win on November 8, 2016, the Democratic client cut off the funds, but Steele continued working for Fusion GPS. According to The Independent, at that time, Simpson "reportedly spent his own money to continue the investigation". According to The New York Times, after the election, Steele's dossier became one of Washington's "worst-kept secrets", and journalists worked to verify the allegations.

On November 18, 2016, Senator McCain, who had been briefed about the allegations, met with former British ambassador to Moscow Sir Andrew Wood at the Halifax International Security Forum in Canada. Wood told McCain about the existence of the collected materials about Trump, and vouched for Steele.

According to Simpson's 2017 testimony to the Senate Judiciary Committee, Steele and David J. Kramer, a longtime McCain aide and former U.S. State Department official working at Arizona State University, met at the Halifax forum and discussed the dossier. Kramer told Steele that McCain wanted to "ask questions about it at the FBI. ... we were concerned about whether the information that we provided previously had ever, you know, risen to the leadership level of the FBI."

Steele had agreed to deliver a hard copy of the reports to McCain, which he received in early December from Kramer. On December 9, McCain met personally with FBI Director Comey and gave him a copy, which did not yet include the last "Report 166", dated December 13, 2016. On March 25, 2019, Senator Lindsey Graham, a close friend of McCain's, rebutted Trump's attacks against McCain, that McCain acted appropriately and had passed the dossier to the FBI. Graham stated: "Senator McCain deserves better." Comey later confirmed that counterintelligence investigations were underway into possible links between Trump associates and Moscow.

Steele later composed the two-page "December memo." It mostly contained allegations against Trump's personal attorney, Michael Cohen, that Cohen later denied. In an April 2017 court filing, Steele revealed previously unreported information that he had given a copy of his last report to a "senior UK government national security official acting in his official capacity, on a confidential basis in hard copy form", because it "had implications for the national security of the US and the UK".

Both Simpson and Steele have denied providing the dossier to BuzzFeed. Unsealed documents from the discovery process in Russian entrepreneur Aleksej Gubarev's defamation lawsuit revealed that David Kramer, an associate of John McCain, gave the dossier to BuzzFeed "in December 2016, weeks after the election", in what Fritsch has called an "ill-advised" Hail Mary pass. Ben Smith, editor of BuzzFeed has described how they got the dossier:

On December 29, the Republican foreign-policy expert David Kramer invited Ken [Bensinger] to his office at the McCain Institute. He then did something careful Washington insiders do: He left Ken alone in the room with the document for 20 minutes, without, in Ken's view, giving clear instructions about whether he could make a copy. Ken took a picture of every page. (Kramer later denied that he'd allowed Ken to copy it ...)

Steele never intended the dossier become public, because it contained unfinished raw intelligence and could have "compromised sources and methods". Steele also worried about the safety of his sources, and expressed concern that if Trump took office, the new agency heads appointed by Trump might be more loyal to him "and could decide to take action against Steele and his source network".

==== Briefings of Obama and Trump ====
External videos
- Comey describes telling Trump about the dossier April 15, 2018, ABC News

External videos
- James Clapper: Comey accounts are accurate April 12, 2018, CNN

On January 5, 2017, the chiefs of four U.S. intelligence agencies briefed President Barack Obama and Vice President Joe Biden about the Russian interference in the election and the existence of the dossier and its allegations.

On the afternoon of January 6, 2017, President-elect Trump and his transition team received a similar briefing in Trump Tower. All four of the top intelligence chiefs met with Trump and his transition team. They were Director of National Intelligence James Clapper, FBI Director James Comey, CIA Director John Brennan, and NSA Director Admiral Mike Rogers. They informed Trump of the Russian election interference, and Comey told them of "a piece of Steele's reporting that indicated Russia had files of derogatory information on both Clinton and the President-elect". Trump later testified under oath "that he was first made aware of the existence of the Dossier by then FBI Director James Comey on 6 January 2018[sic], at a meeting that took place during the transition period following his election". Michael Cohen wrote that he first learned of the dossier on the day it was published by BuzzFeed.

Then, according to a pre-arranged plan, Brennan, Clapper, and Rogers left, and Comey then asked to speak with Trump alone. Comey then informed Trump of the dossier and its allegations about salacious tapes held by the Russians. Comey later reported he was very nervous. The previous day, the secretary of the Department of Homeland Security told Comey to "be very careful", "choose your words carefully", and then "get outta there". Comey described the meeting as "really weird". Trump later said that Comey was trying to blackmail him. In April 2018, Comey said he did not inform Trump the dossier was partly funded by Democrats because that "wasn't necessary for my goal, which was to alert him that we had this information".

On December 14, 2018, the FBI released a document called "Annex A", that was "part of [the] Russia dossier summary" used to brief Trump and Obama. The FBI withheld parts of the synopsis on the grounds that it remained classified and "because it pertains to ongoing investigations or court proceedings, originated with a confidential source or describes confidential investigative techniques or procedures".

Two days after the publication of the dossier on January 10, 2017, James Clapper issued a statement describing the leaks in the press about their Trump Tower meeting with Trump as damaging to U.S. national security. The statement also included the non-committal wording that the U.S. intelligence community "has not made any judgment that the information in this document is reliable, and we did not rely upon it in any way for our conclusions". This contradicted Trump's previous claim that Clapper had said the information in the dossier was false; Clapper's statement actually said the intelligence community had made no judgment on the truth of the information.

James Comey disagreed with Clapper's wording, but Clapper's wording remained unchanged. Comey later told the Office of the Inspector General of his concerns at that time, because he believed the dossier to be more reliable than indicated in Clapper's non-committal statement:

I worry that it may not be best to say "The IC has not made any judgment that the information in the document is reliable." I say that because we HAVE concluded that the source [Steele] is reliable and has a track record with us of reporting reliable information; we have some visibility into his source network, some of which we have determined to be sub-sources in a position to report on such things; and much of what he reports in the current document is consistent with and corroborative of other reporting included in the body of the main IC report. That said, we are not able to sufficiently corroborate the reporting to include in the body of the [ICA] report.

=== Publication and reactions ===
On January 10, 2017, CNN reported that classified documents presented to Obama and Trump the previous week included allegations that Russian operatives possess "compromising personal and financial information" about Trump. CNN said it would not publish specific details on the reports because it had not "independently corroborated the specific allegations". Following the CNN report, BuzzFeed published a 35-page draft dossier that it said was the basis for the briefing, including unverified claims that Russian operatives had collected "embarrassing material" involving Trump that could be used to blackmail him. BuzzFeed said the information included "specific, unverified, and potentially unverifiable allegations of contact between Trump aides and Russian operatives".

The New York Times commented: "Mr. Steele has made clear to associates that he always considered the dossier to be raw intelligence—not established facts, but a starting point for further investigation." Judge Craig Karsnitz described the purpose of the dossier: "An intelligence report is simply a report of information potentially relevant to an investigation. It can take many forms, be true or false, and can be used as opposition research and an intelligence report." Christopher Burrows, co-founder of Orbis Business Intelligence, does not consider it a "dossier", but "information that is referred to as 'raw intelligence' in intelligence circles. ... a mixture of knowledge, rumor and hearsay. ... [A]n intelligence agency would enrich the findings with data, test probabilities and write analyses. It's an elaborate process. But Steele is not an intelligence agency."

BuzzFeed's decision to publish the dossier was immediately criticized by many major media outlets for releasing the draft dossier without verifying its allegations. Washington Post columnist Margaret Sullivan called it "scurrilous allegations dressed up as an intelligence report meant to damage Donald Trump", while The New York Times noted that the publication sparked a debate centering on the use of unsubstantiated information from anonymous sources. BuzzFeed's executive staff said the materials were newsworthy because they were "in wide circulation at the highest levels of American government and media" and argued that this justified public release. A judge in the Superior Court of the District of Columbia agreed with this reasoning when he threw out a libel suit against Steele and Orbis Business Intelligence.

Although the Columbia Journalism Review had originally (January 11, 2017) backed BuzzFeed's publication of the dossier, and editor Kyle Pope had tweeted his support of that decision, he later (November 17, 2021) described it as "a document that was never designed to meet the standards of good journalism", noting that its credibility had collapsed, and concluding that it was the source of "a lot of nonsense and misdirection" in subsequent media coverage and should not have been published at all. Sara Fischer, media reporter for Axios, was critical of the initial press coverage of the dossier before it had been adequately scrutinized.

The draft dossier's publication by BuzzFeed has always been defended by Jack Shafer, Politico's senior media writer, as well as by Richard Tofel of ProPublica and the Columbia Journalism Review. Shafer defended the public's right to know about the allegations against Trump, and saw a parallel in Judge Ungaro's ruling in the defamation suit filed by Aleksej Gubarev. Ungaro wrote that the "privilege exists to protect the media while they gather information needed for the public to exercise effective oversight of the government". She also noted that, before the FBI received any reports from Steele, they had "already opened a counterintelligence investigation into links between Russia and the Trump campaign".

In relation to a defamation lawsuit filed by Gubarev against BuzzFeed regarding their publication of the draft dossier, Senior Master Barbara Fontaine said Steele was "in many respects in the same position as a whistle-blower" because of his actions "in sending part of the dossier to Senator John McCain and a senior government national security official, and in briefing sections of the US media". She said that "it was not known who provided the dossier to BuzzFeed but Mr Steele's evidence was that he was 'horrified and remains horrified' that it was published at all, let alone without substantial redactions."

The founders of Fusion GPS felt so alarmed by what sources reported to Steele that they have defended the fact that they and Steele used intermediaries to pass dossier content to the authorities, but, regarding the publication by BuzzFeed, if it had been up to them, "Steele's reporting never would have seen the light of day." It was published without Steele's permission, and Christopher Burrows said: "We didn't expect the findings on Russia to reach the public."

They were also alarmed that the publication of the draft dossier would endanger sources, and Glenn Simpson immediately phoned Ken Bensinger at BuzzFeed: "Take those fucking reports down right now! You are going to get people killed!"

Steele wrote:

I wonder if BuzzFeed have reflected on the lives and livelihoods they put at risk by publishing the dossier, or the shutter it has drawn down on any further collection efforts on this issue and others by anybody or any government agency. In my view BuzzFeed did the Kremlin's work for them because they were determined not to lose the scoop entirely after CNN broke the original story. One of the most irresponsible journalistic acts.

Six years after publishing the dossier, Ben Smith, editor of BuzzFeed, has described his regrets about how it was done:

If I had to do it again, I would publish the dossier—we couldn't suppress it ... But I would hold more tightly to the document ... I wouldn't simply publish it as a PDF, destined to float free from our earnest caveats. At best, we could have published the document as screenshots attached to the context we had and the context we would learn. Perhaps in some small way, this would have limited its transformation from a set of claims into a banner of the 'resistance.' But I'm not under the illusion that journalists could have contained its wildfire spread, any more than I think we could have concealed it.

Steele does not like the term "dossier":

because it wasn't a dossier. It's a series of reports on a live issue, the election campaign, running through time. These reports were not collated and presented in one offering, nor were they analyzed in detail by us. Effectively, it was a running commentary. It wasn't a dossier.

=== Format ===
When BuzzFeed published the 35-page dossier in January 2017, the individual reports were numbered and dated, but the numeric order didn't always match the chronological order. The 17th report, known as the "December memo", was numbered 166. Of the original reports numbered 1–166, only certain reports were used for the dossier, and it is unknown what happened with the content of the other reports: "For example, the first report is labeled as '080', with no indication given as to where the original 79 antecedents might have gone. The second report is then labeled '086', creating yet another mystery as to 81 through 85, and what content they might contain that would otherwise bolster or contextualize what came before or what follows." In September 2017, Steele revealed he "intentionally left sequential gaps in the numbering of his election-related reports to obscure the actual number of reports being produced on the subject as well as to obscure the timing of the reports."

=== Legal status and comparison to Trump Tower meeting ===
The legal status of the dossier has been questioned, but, because of the legal difference between an "expenditure" by a campaign and a "contribution" to a campaign, it does not run afoul of Federal Election Commission laws (52 U.S. Code § 30121) forbidding foreign nationals from contributing to or aiding political campaigns, and that applies to any form of aid, not just cash donations. The dossier (prepared by a British citizen indirectly hired by the Clinton campaign and DNC) and the 2016 Trump Tower meeting (involving a direct offer of aid by the Russian government to the Trump campaign) are frequently contrasted and conflated in this regard.

Philip Bump has explained "why the Trump Tower meeting may have violated the law—and the Steele dossier likely didn't": "Hiring a foreign party to conduct research is very different, including in legal terms, than being given information by foreign actors seeking to influence the election. What's more, Trump's campaign did accept foreign assistance in 2016, as the investigation by special counsel Robert S. Mueller III determined."

The Trump Tower meeting involved a voluntary offer of aid ("a campaign contribution") to the Trump campaign from the Russian government, and the offer was thus illegal to accept in any manner. Already before the meeting, the Trump campaign knew the source and purpose of the offer of aid, still welcomed the offer, successfully hid it for a year, and when the meeting was finally exposed, Trump issued a deceptive press release about it.

By contrast, Steele's work was a legal campaign expense and did not involve any voluntary offer of aid to the Clinton campaign from the Russian government. FEC law allows such campaign expenditures (properly declared), even if the aid is performed by foreigners.

Bump explains that:

President Trump has deliberately and regularly conflated the two, arguing that the former meeting was innocuous and that the real malfeasance—the real collusion—was between Clinton's campaign and those Russians who were speaking to Steele. Trump is incorrect. There is no reason to think that Clinton's campaign is culpable for any illegal act related to the employment of Steele and good reason to think that the law was broken around the meeting at Trump Tower—and that members of the Trump team might face legal consequences.

Steven L. Hall, former CIA chief of Russia operations, has contrasted Steele's methods with those of Donald Trump Jr., who sought information from a Russian attorney at a meeting in Trump Tower in June 2016: "The distinction: Steele spied against Russia to get info Russia did not want released; Don Jr took a mtg to get info Russians wanted to give."

Jane Mayer referred to the same meeting and contrasted the difference in reactions to Russian attempts to support Trump: When Donald Trump Jr. was offered "dirt" on Clinton as "part of Russia and its government's support for Mr. Trump", instead of "going to the F.B.I., as Steele had" when he learned Russia was helping Trump, Trump's son accepted the support by responding: "If it's what you say, I love it."

=== Legacy ===
Glenn Simpson believes the dossier interrupted a planned renewal of relationships between the United States and Russia that was "not in the interest of the United States"; that it supported the existing FBI investigation into Russian interference; and that it furthered understanding of the hidden relationship between the Russian government and the Trump campaign. Jane Mayer believes the dossier is "perhaps the most controversial opposition research ever to emerge from a Presidential campaign", and Julian Borger described it as "one of the most explosive documents in modern political history".

T. A. Frank has described the dossier as a "case study" in media manipulation. In his 2021 book Spooked: The Trump Dossier, Black Cube, and the Rise of Private Spies, former New York Times journalist Barry Meier commented: "media organizations didn't conduct internal postmortems or public reconstructions about how they handle the dossier story [because] it would have required them to disclose the toxic relationship that had developed between journalists and private spies."

Journalist David Corn of Mother Jones described the dossier as "a convenient foil, their false flag" for the "Trump gang":

It was a clever ploy on the part of the Trump gang: Deny the unfounded—that Trump was caught on tape consorting with urinating prostitutes and that he conspired directly with Putin—to sidestep the damning reality that Trump and his aides betrayed the nation by both encouraging the Russian attack and trying to cover up Putin's sinister intervention.

According to Tommy Vietor, "once a narrative enters the media ether, it can become uncontrollable ... once a rumor gets some traction, it's almost impossible to fix it, even if it is false. The problem with the pee tape allegation is it is so graphic, it is so memorable, that it doesn't matter how many times you knock it down – people are going to remember it."

As long as it is not released, the alleged pee tape has a lasting effect. When Steele was asked why the Russians had not released the tape, he replied "It hasn't needed to be released. ... I think the Russians felt they'd got pretty good value out of Donald Trump when he was president of the U.S."

The founders of Fusion GPS have written: "Ultimately, whether the incident detailed in the dossier is true or not is likely not of paramount importance. The Russians had ample kompromat against Trump and his top aides with or without any pee tape."

== Authorship and sources ==
The dossier is based on information from witting and unwitting anonymous sources known to counterintelligence specialist Christopher Steele. Some were later revealed.

=== Christopher Steele ===
When CNN reported the existence of the dossier on January 10, 2017, it did not name the author of the dossier, but revealed that he was British. Steele concluded that his anonymity had been "fatally compromised", and, realizing it was "only a matter of time until his name became public knowledge", fled into hiding with his family in fear of "a prompt and potentially dangerous backlash against him from Moscow". His friends later reported that he feared assassination by Russians. The Wall Street Journal revealed Steele's name the next day, on January 11. Orbis Business Intelligence Ltd, for whom Steele worked at the time the dossier was authored, and its director Christopher Burrows, a counterterrorism specialist, would not confirm or deny that Orbis had produced the dossier. On March 7, 2017, as some members of the U.S. Congress were expressing interest in meeting with or hearing testimony from Steele, he reemerged after weeks in hiding, appearing publicly on camera and stating, "I'm really pleased to be back here working again at the Orbis's offices in London today."

Called by the media a "highly regarded Kremlin expert" and "one of MI6's greatest Russia specialists", Steele formerly worked for the British intelligence agency MI6 for 22 years, including four years as "an undercover agent" at the British embassy in Moscow, and headed MI6's Russia Desk for three years at the end of his MI6 career. He entered MI6 in 1987, directly after his graduation from Cambridge University. He currently works for Orbis Business Intelligence Ltd, a private intelligence company he co-founded in London.

Sir Andrew Wood, the former British ambassador to Moscow, has vouched for Steele's reputation. He views Steele as a "very competent professional operator. ... I take the report seriously. I don't think it's totally implausible." He also said "the report's key allegation—that Trump and Russia's leadership were communicating via secret back channels during the presidential campaign—was eminently plausible". FBI investigators reportedly treat Steele "as a peer", whose experience as a trusted Russia expert has included assisting the Justice Department, British prime ministers, and at least one U.S. president.

Steele's biases and motivations toward Trump appear to have changed over time. Starting in 2007, many years before he started his opposition research on Trump, he repeatedly met Ivanka Trump over several years, had a "friendly relationship" with her, and was "favorably disposed" to the Trump family. They even discussed the possibility of the Trump Organization using the services of Orbis Business Intelligence, but no arrangements were made. Simpson has also confirmed that "there was no pre-existing animus toward Trump by Steele or Fusion".

Later, as Steele was preparing the dossier before the 2016 election, Bruce Ohr said Steele, based on what he learned during his research, told him he "was desperate that Donald Trump not get elected and was passionate about him not being president" (a quote disputed by Steele), attitudes that have been described by Julian Sanchez as "entirely natural, not suggestive of preexisting bias", considering Steele believed his own reporting. Steele has disputed Ohr's statement, and he told interviewers for Inspector General Horowitz that Ohr's wording was a paraphrase of his sentiments and not an exact quote, and the IG Report continues: "Steele told us that based on what he learned during his research he was concerned that Trump was a national security risk and he had no particular animus against Trump otherwise." Steele told the FBI that he "did not begin his investigation with any bias against Trump, but based on the information he learned during the investigation became very concerned about the consequences of a Trump presidency."

Steele first became a CHS for the FBI in 2013 in connection with the investigation in the 2015 FIFA corruption case, but he considered the relationship as contractual. He said the relationship "was never really resolved and both sides turned a blind eye to it. It was not really ideal." Later, the Inspector General report on the Crossfire Hurricane investigation discusses "divergent expectations about Steele's conduct in connection with his election reporting", as Steele considered his first duty to his paying clients, and not to the FBI. The Inspector General's report states that "Steele contends that he was never a CHS for the FBI but rather that his consulting firm had a contractual relationship with the FBI." Steele said "he never recalled being told that he was a CHS and that he never would have accepted such an arrangement". This divergence in expectations was a factor that "ultimately resulted in the FBI formally closing Steele as a CHS in November 2016 (although ... the FBI continued its relationship with Steele through Ohr)."

On May 3, 2021, The Daily Telegraph reported that Steele and Orbis Business Intelligence, using new sources not used for the original dossier, continued to supply the FBI with raw intelligence during the Trump presidency. During an interview with the FBI in September 2017, Steele informed the FBI that Orbis had "four discrete, 'hermetically-sealed' main agent networks". His primary sub-source for the dossier was no longer "active" at the time of the interview with FBI agents, but that another "main agent network is up and running and is now starting to get good information". This resulted in "a second dossier for the FBI on Donald Trump". It included further claims of Russian election meddling; "alleged Russian interference linked to Mr Trump and his associates"; claims about the "existence of further sex tapes"; and "further details of Mr Manafort's alleged Russian contacts".

In October 2024, Steele published his first book, Unredacted: Russia, Trump, and the Fight for Democracy, defending his work on the dossier and arguing that Trump poses a threat to Western democracy. In interviews promoting the book, Steele maintained that he still believes the alleged compromising tape exists, stating "I think it's just not really been properly bottomed out."

=== Steele's sources ===
Igor Danchenko was Steele's "collector" or his "primary sub-source," who "used a network of [further] sub-sources to gather the information that was relayed to Steele". Steele asked Danchenko to help him in March 2016. Initially Danchenko was asked to look into Manafort. Danchenko told the FBI he didn't know about Manafort at the time, and was out of his depth. In June, Steele asked him to also investigate Trump, Page, Cohen, and Flynn. Danchenko said one of his sources for information such as Cohen's supposed Prague trip was a previously government-affiliated journalist and spokesperson named Olga Kalinka, who later denied being a source for the dossier.

District Judge Anthony Trenga analyzed the question of Steele's sources and acknowledged that Steele had other sources than Danchenko. He countered Special Counsel John Durham's contention "that Danchenko was Steele's primary source of information for the Steele Reports writ large" by noting that Steele used other sources than Danchenko: "Nor is there any evidence that ... Steele only, or almost entirely, used Danchenko as his source for the Reports."

In an Alfa-Bank lawsuit, Steele revealed that he "did not rely on Danchenko alone, instead obtaining information from "one main source and a couple of subsidiary sources". According to Steele: "The dossier was comprised of intelligence obtained from 3 sources and approximately 20 sub-sources."

Paul Wood, writing in The Spectator, wrote: "Steele had '20 to 30' sources for the dossier and in two decades as a professional intelligence officer he had never seen such complete agreement by such a wide range of sources."

Simpson has said that, to his knowledge, Steele did not pay any of his sources. According to investigative reporter Jane Mayer of The New Yorker, Orbis has a large number of paid "collectors" (also called subsources) whose information came from a network of often unwitting sub-subsources. Since payment of these sub-subsources can be seen as bribery or might encourage exaggeration, they are unpaid. Steele testified that these sub-subsources "were not paid and were not aware that their information was being passed to Orbis or Fusion GPS".

According to British journalist Luke Harding, Steele's sources were not new, but trusted, proven, and familiar sources. Howard Blum said Steele leaned on sources "whose loyalty and information he had bought and paid for over the years". Steele later informed the Inspector General's investigators that this "source network did not involve sources from his time as a former foreign government employee and was developed entirely in the period after he retired from governmental service." (Footnote 214)

==== Igor Danchenko ====
In January 2017, Danchenko was contacted by the FBI for an interview. About a week and a half later, in exchange for legal immunity, he agreed to answer questions about his working relationship with Steele, as well as his opinion on the accuracy of the Steele dossier. He was interviewed for three days by the FBI and said that Steele misstated or exaggerated certain information. Danchenko has said "he did not know who Mr. Steele's client was at the time and considered himself a nonpartisan analyst and researcher".

The FBI found that he was "truthful and cooperative", but the FBI's Supervisory Intel Analyst said that "it was his impression that the Primary Sub-source may not have been 'completely truthful' and may have been minimizing certain aspects of what he/she told Steele". He also "believed that there were instances where the Primary Sub-source was 'minimizing' certain facts but did not believe that he/she was 'completely fabricating' events". He added that he "did not know whether he could support a 'blanket statement' that the Primary Sub-source had been truthful". Starting in March 2017, Danchenko became a paid CHS for the FBI. During this time, he allegedly lied to the FBI five times during interviews about the dossier and was terminated in October 2020. He was later prosecuted by John Durham for those alleged lies, but on October 14, 2022, the judge dropped one charge, and four days later, Danchenko was acquitted of the other four charges.

In July 2020, Danchenko was unmasked after the declassification of the interview report by Attorney General William P. Barr, who "has repeatedly been accused of abusing his powers to help Mr. Trump politically". Lindsey Graham had also "asked the F.B.I. to declassify the interview report". Immediately after Barr's unmasking of Danchenko, Graham posted it to the Senate Judiciary Committee's web site. The declassification order was criticized by former law enforcement officials as an unmasking that could endanger other sources and make the FBI's work harder. About two weeks after he was unmasked, Danchenko received a subpoena from Alfa-Bank, and his lawyer revealed that his client "fears for his life", since Russian agents are known to kill such informers.

The outing of Danchenko by Attorney General William Barr also brought to light an inaccuracy in the dossier that describes him as a "Russian-based" source. In fact, although he traveled to Russia six times in 2016 to gather information, and his source network is mostly in Russia, he is a Ukrainian-born and Russian-trained lawyer, researcher, and expert in Russian politics who lives in the United States.

Danchenko has defended his sources: "I have a longstanding relationship with most of my sources ... and have no reason to believe that any of them fabricated information that was given to me. More importantly, I have yet to see anything credible that indicates that the raw intelligence I collected was inaccurate." In August 2024, "Danchenko still believes most of the dossier's rumors were correct, and that the overall theme of Trump's suspect connections to Russia was spot on. ... And yet, Danchenko still believes – despite never having viewed it, despite his evidence really only being rumors and innuendo that he gathered but that many discredit – that there's a pee tape."

===== Arrest and indictment =====
On November 4, 2021, Danchenko was arrested and charged with five counts of making false statements to the FBI on five separate occasions regarding the sources of material he provided for the Steele dossier. These included Danchenko having allegedly obscured his relationship with Charles Dolan Jr. and having allegedly fabricated contacts with Sergei Millian.

On October 14, 2022, the judge dropped one charge, and four days later, Danchenko was acquitted of the other four charges, thus dealing special counsel Durham his second trial loss.

Right-wing columnist and attorney Andrew C. McCarthy reacted to what he described as the "if not irrational, then exaggerated" reactions by Trump supporters to these reports of arrests. He urged them to be cautious as John Durham's "indictments narrowly allege that the defendants lied to the FBI only about the identity or status of people from whom they were getting information, not about the information itself."

===== Value as FBI source =====
During his trial, two FBI officials revealed Danchenko was "an uncommonly valuable" CHS for several years whose role went far beyond the Steele dossier, and that his reports were used in 25 investigations and 40 intelligence reports between 2017 and 2020. FBI Special Agent Kevin Helson, Danchenko's handler, testified that Danchenko was considered "a model" informant who "reshaped the way the U.S. even perceives threats," and that losing him as a source "harmed national security."

Helson testified that Danchenko's reports as a confidential informant were used by the FBI in 25 investigations and 40 intelligence reports during a nearly four-year period from March 2017 to October 2020. ... Danchenko, the FBI agent said, was considered 'a model' informant and 'reshaped the way the U.S. even perceives threats.' Helson said that none of his previous informants had ever had as many sub-sources as Danchenko and that others at the FBI have continued to ask in recent months for Danchenko's assistance amid Russia's invasion of Ukraine.

==== Olga Galkina ====
Olga Galkina, labeled by the FBI as "Source 3", was alleged to be an unwitting sub-source in Danchenko's network of sources and "stood as the dossier's most important contributor". She is an old friend of Danchenko and a middle school classmate. On October 28, 2020, The Wall Street Journal described her as a Russian public-relations executive with many past jobs in government and the private sector that enabled her to build a "vast network" of sources.

Galkina stated in an affidavit that "she had no idea Danchenko had used 'private discussions or private communications' as dossier material. 'I believe that Mr. Danchenko identified me as Sub-Source 3 to create more authoritativeness for his work'."

According to the Wall Street Journal, she was Steele's source for the hacking accusations against Webzilla, and the source of the allegations about a secret meeting in Prague involving Michael Cohen and three colleagues.

==== Sergei Millian ====
Sergei Millian was alleged to be an unwitting sub-source in Danchenko's network of sources. He was described in the IG Report as sources D and E, and "Person 1". As an unwitting source, he was alleged to have confided in a compatriot, who then passed that information on to Steele. That information was used in Reports 80, 95, and 102. He denies being a dossier source. Although Steele told the FBI that Person 1 was a "boaster" and "egoist" who "may engage in some embellishment", the FBI omitted these "caveats about his source" from the FISA application.

In November 2021, Millian's alleged involvement as a source was brought into question. Igor Danchenko is alleged to have lied to Steele about Millian's involvement: "Danchenko told the FBI that he knew Steele believed that he had direct contact with Millian and that he 'never corrected' Steele about that 'erroneous belief'." On November 12, 2021, following the November 4 indictment of Igor Danchenko, The Washington Post corrected and removed the "parts of two stories regarding the Steele dossier" that identified Millian as a source. CNN reported that "Millian has since said he was 'framed' by Danchenko and has publicly denied that they ever spoke, though there is no indication in the indictment that Millian ever denied it to the FBI or under oath." In October 2022, judge Anthony Trenga cast doubt on Millian and two 2020 emails he wrote denying he talked to Danchenko: The "emails lack the necessary 'guarantees of trustworthiness' as the government does not offer direct evidence that Millian actually wrote the emails, and, even if he did, Millian possessed opportunity and motive to fabricate and/or misrepresent his thoughts."

==== Charles Dolan Jr. ====
Dolan was another unwitting source for Danchenko. He was "well-known among Russia experts" and also "well-connected in Russian President Vladimir Putin's inner circle". He was a public relations executive and had "numerous, but not high-profile, roles in Democratic circles". He had been active in Bill and Hillary Clinton's campaigns, including as a volunteer in her 2016 campaign. While working for Ketchum, a PR firm in New York, he "helped handle global public relations for the Russian Federation for eight years ending in 2014". He also became acquainted with Danchenko and allegedly "fed the dossier before he fought against it". Danchenko had also introduced Olga Galkina, another one of Danchenko's sources, to him. Dolan and Galkina had regular interactions "including in ways that indicated they supported Mrs. Clinton's campaign".

Dolan's involvement as an unwitting source for Danchenko came to light in connection with Danchenko's indictment. Danchenko was accused, and later acquitted, of lying to the FBI by stating that "he did not discuss information in the dossier with the individual" [Dolan], "when in fact, the indictment claims, some of the material was 'gathered directly' from" him. Danchenko's indictment "suggests that while Danchenko allegedly misled people about his conversations with Dolan, the executive also misled Danchenko".

The information allegedly from Dolan that ended up in the dossier was alleged to be "rumors about Paul Manafort's dismissal as Trump's campaign chairman. ... Two days later, the indictment alleges, that information appeared in one of Steele's reports." Both men had also met in Moscow in June 2016, where Dolan had stayed at the Ritz-Carlton Hotel and toured the presidential suite where the dossier alleged Trump had been recorded by Russian intelligence in 2013. According to the Danchenko indictment, "a hotel staff member told [Dolan] that Mr. Trump had stayed there – but Mr. Dolan and another person on the tour told the F.B.I. that the staff member did not mention any salacious activity." After meeting in Moscow, Danchenko flew "to London to provide information that would later appear in the dossier, the indictment claims, setting forth the timeline of these encounters without stating that Dolan was the source for specific claims about the purported tape."

As the view that Millian was "Source D" has been questioned, an alternate source has been proposed, and that is Charles Dolan, Jr.:

Danchenko may have gotten his information about the hotel encounter not from Millian but from a Democratic Party operative with long-standing ties to Hillary Clinton. The indictment doesn't name the executive by name, but he has been identified as Charles Dolan Jr.

Dolan later stated "that he believed the analyst [Danchenko] 'worked for FSB'. ... Dolan later admitted to the FBI ... that he had 'fabricated' the basis of certain details he had provided to Danchenko. He also reportedly said he was unaware of the specifics of Danchenko's work, or that the information they were trading would be transmitted to the FBI. Dolan's 'historical and ongoing involvement in Democratic politics,' the indictment asserts, 'bore upon' his 'reliability, motivations, and potential bias as a source of information' for Steele's reports."

Dolan told authorities that Clinton campaign officials "did not direct, and were not aware of" his contacts with Danchenko. Journalist Stanley-Becker stated "new allegations make Dolan one of the most mysterious figures in the saga of the Steele dossier".

=== Discrepancies between sources and their allegations ===
One of the findings of the 2019 Inspector General's report related to conflicting accounts of sourced content in the dossier. When Danchenko was later interviewed by the FBI about the allegations sourced to them, he gave accounts that conflicted with Steele's renderings in the dossier and implied that Steele "misstated or exaggerated" their statements. FBI agent Peter Strzok wrote that "Recent interviews and investigation, however, reveal Steele may not be in a position to judge the reliability of his subsource network."

On October 17, 2021, in Steele's first major interview with ABC News, George Stephanopoulos asked why Danchenko, the Primary Sub-source, minimized his role by telling the FBI that he "felt that the tenor of Steele's reports was far more 'conclusive' than was justified", and that much of the information he had provided – including word of the purported 'pee tape' – came from 'word of mouth and hearsay ... conversation that [he/she] had with friends over beers,' and was likely 'made in jest'." Steele held the same view as the FBI's Supervisory Intel Analyst that Danchenko was "minimizing" certain things: "his collector may have 'taken fright' at having his cover blown and tried to 'downplay and underestimate' his own reporting when he spoke to the FBI".

=== Risk of contamination with Russian disinformation considered ===
The dossier has been attacked by Trump supporters, especially Senators Chuck Grassley and Ron Johnson, with claims it contained Russian disinformation. Those claims were rejected: Under the heading "Crossfire Hurricane Team's Assessment of Potential Russian Influence on the Steele Election Reporting," the Inspector General's investigative team examined how seriously the FBI Crossfire Hurricane team had considered "whether Steele's election reports, or aspects of them, were the product of a Russian disinformation campaign" and rejected the claims.

Senators Grassley and Johnson claimed that some previously redacted footnotes in the IG report 'confirmed' that the dossier "was the product of a Russian disinformation campaign". Later press releases toned down their language and did not repeat their exact claims. An article published on Lawfare examined the unredacted footnotes and pushed back against their claims:

The footnotes do not confirm that the Steele dossier was the product of Russian disinformation. But two footnotes do indicate that the FBI received reports alleging that portions of Steele's evidence were the product of a Russian disinformation plot—though the footnotes do not establish that these reports were credible. The other two footnotes offer further reason to question the veracity of Steele's reporting, but they do not necessarily implicate the existence of a Russian disinformation operation.

Lawfare includes a direct quote from a footnote affirming that, as of June 2017, the FBI had no evidence that Steele's network had been "penetrated or compromised":

Footnotes 342 and 350 most directly implicate whether the Steele dossier could have been part of a Russian disinformation operation. ... the footnote's final sentence reveals that "an early June 2017 [U.S. intelligence community] report indicated that two persons affiliated with RIS were aware of Steele's election investigation in early July 2016. The [FBI] Supervisory Intel Analyst told us he was aware of these reports, but that he had no information as of June 2017 that Steele's election reporting source network had been penetrated or compromised.

Lawfare rejected the two Senators' claims: "The new information in the two footnotes does not support the senators' initial claim that the footnotes confirm the existence of a Russian operation to disrupt the FBI's investigation. The footnotes only establish that the FBI received certain reports. The veracity of the information also remains unconfirmed."

It is a fact that Steele and Oleg Deripaska ("Russian Oligarch 1") have had dealings with each other. While Steele was working for a law firm hired by Deripaska to track down money allegedly stolen from him by Paul Manafort, Steele was also working between 2014 and 2016 with the FBI and Justice Department in an unsuccessful classified effort to flip Deripaska so he could be an FBI informant. This Deripaska/Steele association has been touted as a means whereby the Russians could get disinformation inserted into the dossier. The FBI rejected this theory as Priestap found it implausible, and Steele has denied that Deripaska knew of the dossier's existence. The IG report stated:

According to an FBI memorandum prepared in December 2017 for a Congressional briefing, by the time the Crossfire Hurricane investigation was transferred to the Special Counsel in May 2017, the FBI "did not assess it likely that the [Steele] [election reporting] was generated in connection to a Russian disinformation campaign." Priestap told us that the FBI "didn't have any indication whatsoever" by May 2017 that the Russians were running a disinformation campaign through the Steele election reporting. Priestap explained, however, that if the Russians, in fact, were attempting to funnel disinformation through Steele to the FBI using Russian Oligarch 1, he did not understand the goal.

Bill Priestap further explained that "the Russians ... favored Trump, they're trying to denigrate Clinton ... [and] I don't know why you'd run a disinformation campaign to denigrate Trump on the side."

Jane Mayer describes how

Trump's defenders have claimed that Steele fell prey to Russian disinformation, and so, therefore, it is he, not Trump, who has been a useful idiot for the Russians. But Steele tells the authors, 'These people simply have no idea what they're talking about.' He emphasizes that his network of sources 'is tried and tested' and has 'been proven up in many other matters.' He adds, 'I've spent my entire adult life working with Russian disinformation. It's an incredibly complex subject that is at the very core of my training and my professional mission.

The IG Report said Steele explained how sophisticated the Russians were at planting and controlling misinformation, but Steele "had no evidence that his reporting was 'polluted' with Russian disinformation". The inspector general's report ultimately concluded "that more should have been done to examine Steele's contacts with intermediaries of Russian oligarchs in order to assess those contacts as potential sources of disinformation that could have influenced Steele's reporting".

In 2019, during Trump's first impeachment inquiry, national security expert Fiona Hill stated Steele may have been "played" by the Russians to spread disinformation.

== Allegations ==
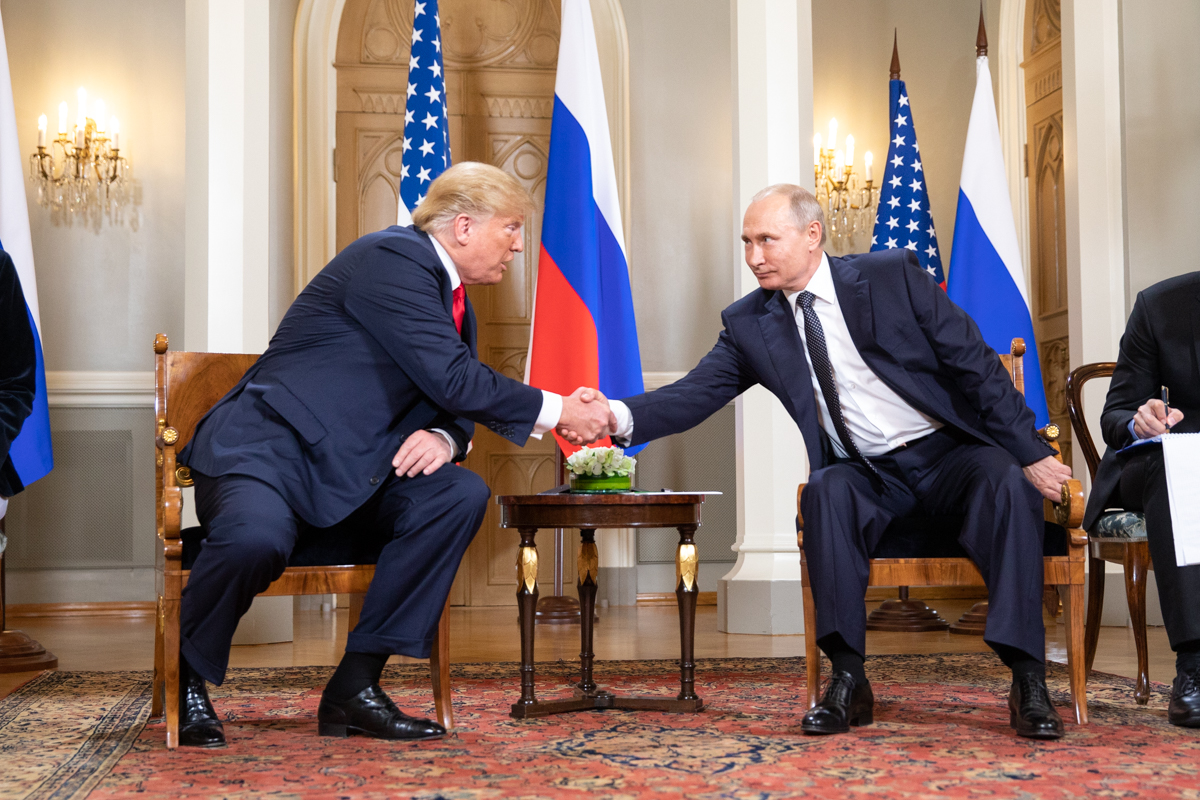
President Donald Trump with Russian President Vladimir Putin at 2018 summit in Helsinki, Finland, on July 16, 2018

While the dossier played a significant role in initially highlighting the general friendliness between Trump and the Putin administration, the corroboration status of specific allegations is highly variable. The following allegations have been publicly corroborated by U.S. intelligence agencies, the January 2017 ODNI report, and the Mueller report: "that the Russian government was working to get Mr. Trump elected"; that Russia sought "to cultivate people in Trump's orbit"; that Trump campaign officials and associates had secretive contacts with Russian officials and agents; that Putin favored Trump over Hillary Clinton; that Putin personally ordered an "influence campaign" to harm Clinton's campaign and to "undermine public faith in the US democratic process"; and that he ordered cyberattacks on both parties. Some other allegations are plausible but not specifically confirmed, but, according to Lawfare, James Clapper, and Fox News host Shepard Smith, none are disproven.

Trump and Putin have repeatedly denied the allegations, and Trump has labeled the dossier "discredited", "debunked", "fictitious", and "fake news".

In the sections below, the allegations are simply presented as they are, but in the Corroboration status of specific allegations section, the widely varying verification status for a number of allegations is examined, sometimes with conflicting reports for or against their veracity, including whether some sources have rejected them.

Each allegation should be read as "Sources allege that" (and then the allegation).

=== Cultivation of Trump ===
- ... that "Russian authorities" had cultivated Trump "for at least 5 years", and that the operation was "supported and directed" by Putin. (Report 80)
- ... that the Russian government's support for Trump was originally conducted by the Ministry of Foreign Affairs, then by the Federal Security Service (FSB), and was eventually directly handled by the Russian presidency because of its "growing significance over time". (Report 130)

The dossier describes two different Russian operations. The first was an attempt, lasting many years, to find ways to influence Trump, probably not so much "to make Mr. Trump a knowing agent of Russia", but most likely to make him a source the Russians could use. This operation utilized kompromat (Russian: short for "compromising material") and proposals of business deals. The second operation was very recent and involved contacts with Trump's representatives during the campaign to discuss the hacking of the DNC and Podesta.

=== Conspiracy, cooperation, and back channel communication ===
- ... that there was an extensive and "well-developed conspiracy of co-operation between [the Trump campaign] and the Russian leadership", with information willingly exchanged in both directions. That this cooperation was "sanctioned at the 'highest level' and involved Russian diplomatic staff based in the US". That the Trump campaign used "moles within DNC as well as hackers in the US and Russia". (Report 95)
- ... that Trump had "so far declined various sweetener real estate business deals", but had "accepted a regular flow of intelligence from the Kremlin", notably on his political rivals. (Report 80)
- ... that Trump associates had established "an intelligence exchange [with the Kremlin] for at least 8 years". That Trump and his team had delivered "intelligence on the activities, business and otherwise, in the US of leading Russian oligarchs and their families", as requested by Putin. (Report 97)

=== Why Russia supports Trump ===
- ... that a major goal of the Russians in supporting Trump was "to upset the liberal international status quo, including on Ukraine-related sanctions, which was seriously disadvantaging the country". (Report 130)
- ... that Putin aimed to spread "discord and disunity" within the United States and between Western allies, whom he saw as a threat to Russia's interests. (Report 80)
- ... that "TRUMP was viewed as divisive in disrupting the whole US political system; anti-Establishment; and a pragmatist with whom they could do business." That Trump would remain a divisive force even if not elected. (Report 130)

=== Changing relationships ===
- ... that "there had been talk in the Kremlin of TRUMP being forced to withdraw from the presidential race altogether as a result of recent events, ostensibly on grounds of his state and unsuitability for high office." (Report 100)
- ... that the Trump camp became angry and resentful toward Putin when they realized he not only was aiming to weaken Clinton and bolster Trump, but was attempting to "undermine the US government and democratic system more generally". (Report 102)

=== Kompromat and blackmail: Trump ===
- ... that Trump "hated" Obama so much that when he stayed in the Presidential suite of the Ritz-Carlton Hotel in Moscow, he employed "a number of prostitutes to perform a 'golden showers' (urination) show in front of him" in order to defile the bed used by the Obamas on an earlier visit. The alleged incident from 2013 was reportedly filmed and recorded by the FSB as kompromat. (Report 80)
- ... that Trump was vulnerable to blackmail from Russian authorities for paying bribes and engaging in unorthodox and embarrassing sexual behavior over the years, and that the authorities were "able to blackmail him if they so wished". (Reports 80, 95, 97, 113)
- ... that the Kremlin had promised Trump they would not use the kompromat collected against him "as leverage, given high levels of voluntary co-operation forthcoming from his team". (Report 97)
- ... that Trump had explored the real estate sectors in St. Petersburg and Moscow, "but in the end TRUMP had had to settle for the use of extensive sexual services there from local prostitutes rather than business success". (Report 95)
- ... that witnesses to his "sex parties in the city" had been "'silenced' i.e. bribed or coerced to disappear." (Report 113)
- ... that Trump had paid bribes in St. Petersburg "to further his [business] interests". (Report 113)
- ... that Aras Agalarov "would know most of the details of what the Republican presidential candidate had got up to" in St. Petersburg. (Report 113)
- ... that Trump associates did not fear "the negative media publicity surrounding alleged Russian interference" because it distracted attention from his "business dealings in China and other emerging markets" involving "large bribes and kickbacks" that could be devastating if revealed. (Report 95)

=== Kompromat: Clinton ===
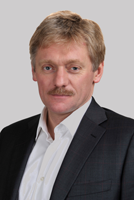
Dmitry Peskov (2010s)

- ... that Putin ordered the maintenance of a secret dossier on Hillary Clinton, with content dating back to the time of her husband's presidency. The dossier comprised eavesdropped conversations, either from bugging devices or from phone intercepts; it did not contain "details/evidence of unorthodox or embarrassing behavior", but focused more on "things she had said which contradicted her current positions on various issues". (Report 80)
- ... that the Clinton dossier had been collated by the FSB and was managed by Dmitry Peskov, Putin's press secretary. (Report 80)

=== Kremlin pro-Trump and anti-Clinton ===
- ... that Putin feared and hated Hillary Clinton. (Report 95)
- ... that there was a "Kremlin campaign to aid TRUMP and damage CLINTON". (Reports 95, 100)
- ... that Putin's interference operation had an "objective of weakening CLINTON and bolstering TRUMP". (Report 102)

=== Key roles of Manafort, Cohen, and Page ===
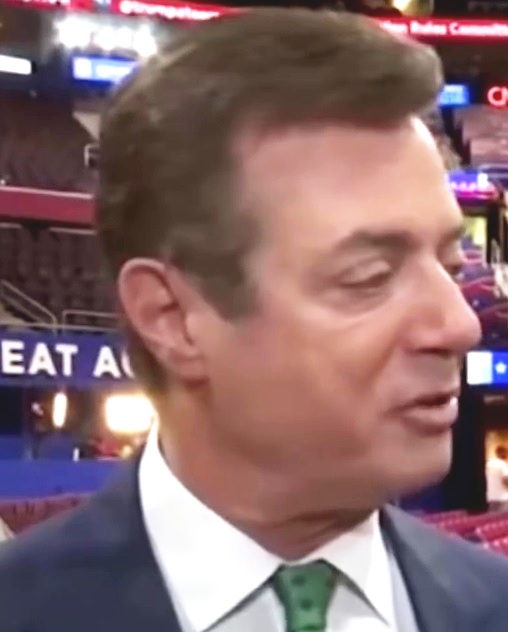
Paul Manafort (2016)

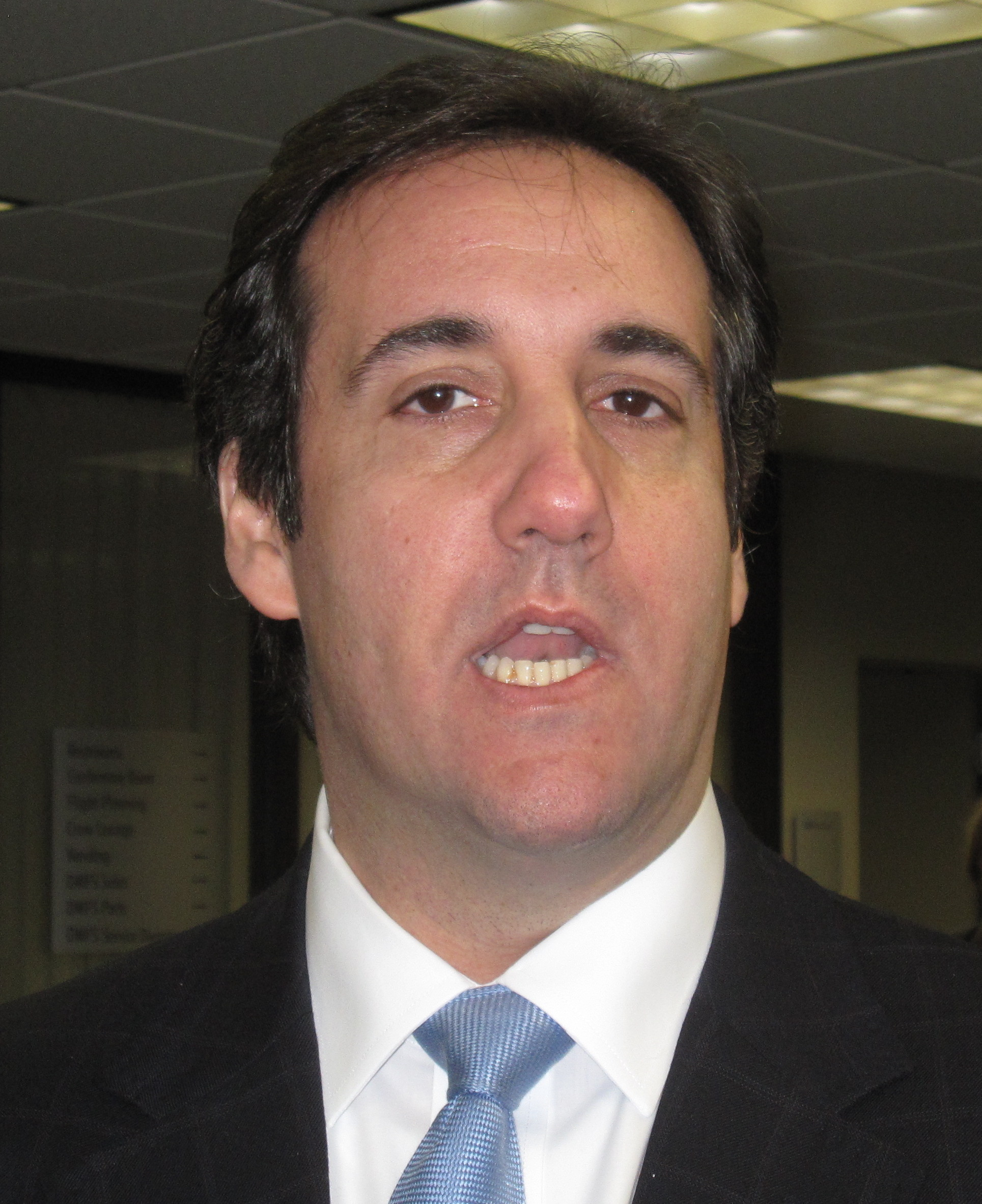
Michael Cohen (2011)

- ... that then-Trump campaign manager Paul Manafort had "managed" a "well-developed conspiracy of co-operation between [the Trump campaign] and the Russian leadership", and that he used Trump's foreign policy advisor, Carter Page, and others, "as intermediaries". (Report 95)
- ... that Page had "conceived and promoted" the timing of the release of hacked emails by WikiLeaks for the purpose of swinging supporters of Bernie Sanders "away from Hillary CLINTON and across to TRUMP". (Reports 95, 102)
- ... that Page was informed by Igor Divyekin, a senior Kremlin Internal Affairs official, "that the Russians had kompromat on Clinton and Trump, and allegedly added that Trump 'should bear this in mind'." (Report 94)
- ... that Igor Divyekin told Page of the possibility of releasing "a dossier of kompromat the Kremlin possessed on Democratic presidential rival, Hillary CLINTON ... to the Republican's campaign team". (Report 94)
- ... that Cohen played a "key role" in the Trump–Russia relationship by maintaining a "covert relationship with Russia", arranging cover-ups and "deniable cash payments", and that his role had grown after Manafort had left the campaign. (Reports 134, 135, 136, 166)
- ... that "COHEN now was heavily engaged in a cover up and damage limitation operation in the attempt to prevent the full details of TRUMP's relationship with Russia being exposed." (Report 135)

=== DNC email hack, leaks, and misinformation ===
- ... that Russia was responsible for the DNC email hacks and the recent appearance of the stolen DNC emails on WikiLeaks, and that the reason for using WikiLeaks was "plausible deniability". (Report 95)
- ... that "the operation had been conducted with the full knowledge and support of TRUMP and senior members of his campaign team". (Report 95)
- ... that after the emails had been forwarded to WikiLeaks, it was decided to not leak more, but to engage in misinformation: "Rather the tactics would be to spread rumours and misinformation about the content of what already had been leaked and make up new content." (Report 101)
- ... that Page had "conceived and promoted" the idea of [the Russians] leaking the stolen DNC emails to WikiLeaks during the 2016 Democratic National Convention. (Reports 95, 102)
- ... that Page had intended the email leaks "to swing supporters of Bernie SANDERS away from Hillary CLINTON and across to TRUMP". (Report 102)
- ... that the hacking of the DNC servers was performed by Romanian hackers ultimately controlled by Putin and paid by both Trump and Putin. (Report 166)
- ... that Cohen, together with three colleagues, secretly met with Kremlin officials in the Prague offices of Rossotrudnichestvo in August 2016, where he arranged "deniable cash payments" to the hackers and sought "to cover up all traces of the hacking operation", as well as "cover up ties between Trump and Russia, including Manafort's involvement in Ukraine". (Reports 135, 166)
- ... that "hackers ... had worked in Europe under Kremlin direction against the CLINTON campaign". (Report 166)

=== Kickbacks and quid pro quo agreements to lift sanctions ===
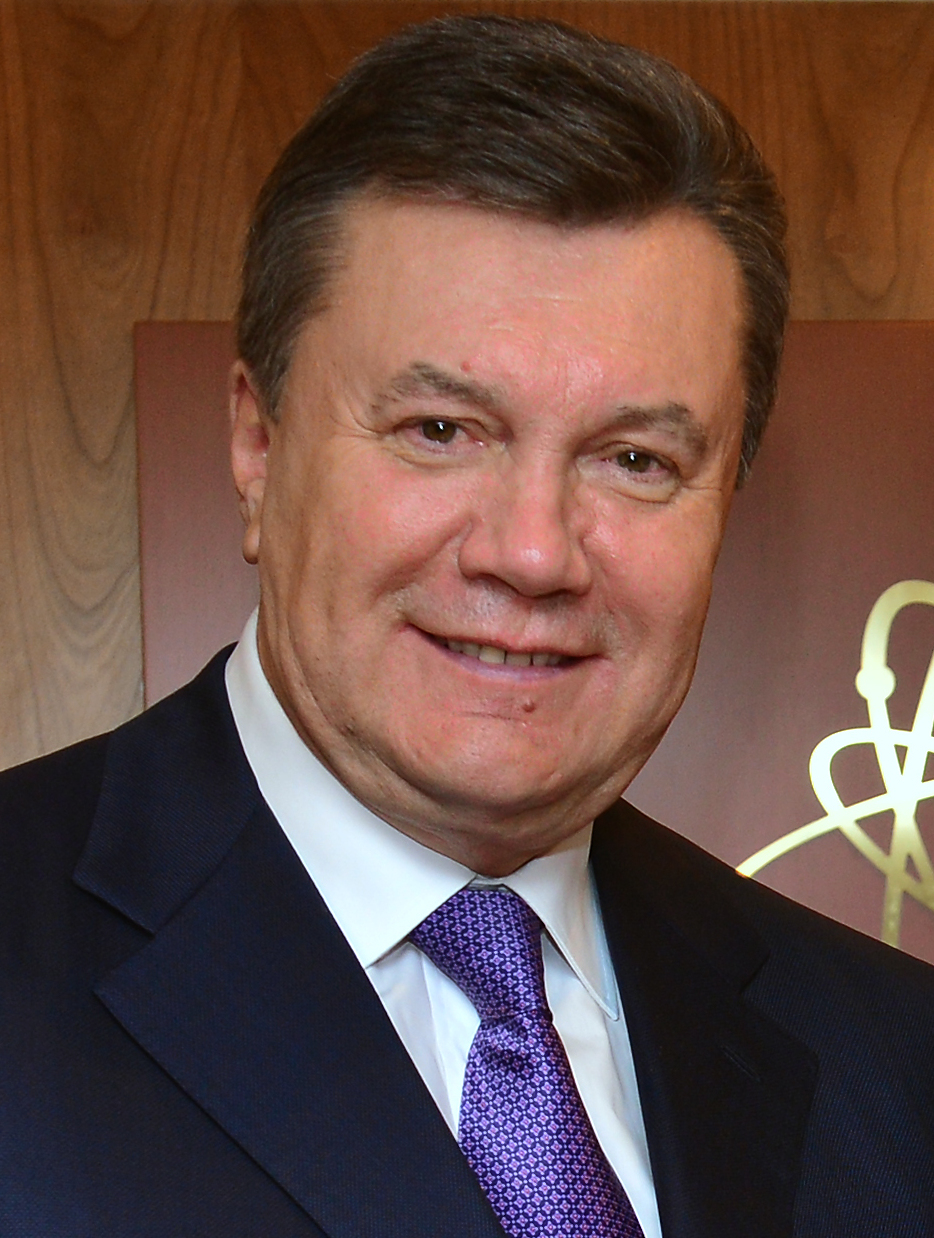
Viktor Yanukovych (2013)

- ... that Viktor Yanukovych, the former pro-Russian President of Ukraine, had told Putin he had been making supposedly untraceable kickback payments to Manafort while he was Trump's campaign manager. (Report 105)
- ... that in return for Russia's leaking the stolen documents to WikiLeaks, "the TRUMP team had agreed to sideline Russian intervention in Ukraine as a campaign issue and to raise US/NATO defense commitments in the Baltics and Eastern Europe to deflect attention away from Ukraine, a priority for PUTIN who needed to cauterise the subject." (Report 95)
- ... that Page had secretly met Rosneft chairman Igor Sechin in Moscow on "either 7 or 8 July", together with a "senior Kremlin Internal Affairs official, DIVYEKIN". (Reports 95, 135, 166)
- ... that Sechin "offered PAGE/TRUMP's associates the brokerage of up to a 19 per cent (privatised) stake in Rosneft" (worth about $11 billion) in exchange for Trump lifting the sanctions against Russia after his election. (Reports 94, 166)

=== Cultivation of various U.S. political figures ===
- ... that the Kremlin had support(ed) "various US political figures, including funding indirectly their recent visits to Moscow. [The source] named a delegation from Lyndon LAROUCHE; presidential candidate Jill STEIN of the Green Party; TRUMP foreign policy adviser Carter PAGE; and former DIA Director Michael Flynn, in this regard as successful in terms of perceived outcomes." (Report 101)

=== Russian spy withdrawn ===
- ... that Russia had hastily withdrawn from Washington their diplomat Mikhail Kalugin (misspelled as "Kulagin"), whose prominent role in the interference operation should remain hidden. (Report 111)

=== Use of botnets and porn traffic by hackers ===
- ... that Aleksej Gubarev's "XBT/Webzilla and its affiliates had been using botnets and porn traffic to transmit viruses, plant bugs, steal data and conduct 'altering operations' against the Democratic Party leadership" and that Gubarev had been coerced by the FSB and was a significant player. (Report 166)

== Corroboration status with passage of time ==
External videos
- US officials corroborate aspects of dossier, February 10, 2017, CNN

The following allegations have been publicly corroborated by U.S. intelligence agencies, the January 2017 ODNI report, and the Mueller report: "that the Russian government was working to get Mr. Trump elected"; that Russia sought "to cultivate people in Trump's orbit"; that Trump campaign officials and associates had secretive contacts with Russian officials and agents; that Putin favored Trump over Hillary Clinton; that Putin personally ordered an "influence campaign" to harm Clinton's campaign and to "undermine public faith in the US democratic process"; and that he ordered cyberattacks on both parties. Some other allegations are plausible but not specifically confirmed, and some are dubious in retrospect but not strictly disproven.

In a December 2018 Lawfare report titled "The Steele Dossier: A Retrospective", the authors described how, after two years, they "wondered whether information made public as a result of the Mueller investigation—and the passage of two years—has tended to buttress or diminish the crux of Steele's original reporting." To make their judgments, they analyzed a number of "trustworthy and official government sources" and found that "These materials buttress some of Steele's reporting, both specifically and thematically. The dossier holds up well over time, and none of it, to our knowledge, has been disproven." They concluded with:

The Mueller investigation has clearly produced public records that confirm pieces of the dossier. And even where the details are not exact, the general thrust of Steele's reporting seems credible in light of what we now know about extensive contacts between numerous individuals associated with the Trump campaign and Russian government officials.
However, there is also a good deal in the dossier that has not been corroborated in the official record and perhaps never will be—whether because it's untrue, unimportant or too sensitive. As a raw intelligence document, the Steele dossier, we believe, holds up well so far.

Simpson has described his own and Steele's confidence in Steele's work: "Nothing that I have seen disproves anything in the dossier. Which isn't to say I think it's all true. I don't think Chris thinks it's all true, either. But there's a difference between things being fake or a hoax or a fraud or a lie and things being incorrect." Steele, the author of the dossier, said he believes that 70–90% of the dossier is accurate, although he gives the "golden showers" allegation a 50% chance of being true.

The following sections describe how some allegations have been corroborated, while others remain unverified because they may be "untrue, unimportant or too sensitive".

== Corroboration status of specific allegations ==
Certain allegations have been corroborated, and the public knows which ones, but the public does not know the status of some other allegations that may have also been corroborated ("portions of the material were corroborated").

When Reince Priebus questioned Comey about why he told Trump about the dossier's salacious allegations, "Comey revealed that elements of the dossier had been confirmed":

I explained that the analysts from all three agencies agreed it was relevant and that portions of the material were corroborated by other intelligence,' he wrote. Though parts of the memo are redacted, Comey seems to note that some information 'was consistent with and corroborated by other intelligence, and that the incoming president needed to know the rest of it was out there.'

=== Cultivation of Trump through time ===
Source(s) for Report 80 (June 2016) alleged that the Kremlin had been cultivating Trump for "at least 5 years".

According to former KGB major Yuri Shvets, Trump became the target of a joint Czech intelligence services and KGB spying operation after he married Czech model Ivana Zelnickova and was cultivated as an "asset" by Russian intelligence since 1977: "Russian intelligence gained an interest in Trump as far back as 1977, viewing Trump as an exploitable target."

Luke Harding writes that documents show Czechoslovakia spied on Trump during the 1970s and 1980s, when he was married to Ivana Trump, his Czechoslovakia-born first wife. Harding writes that the Czechoslovak government spied on Trump because of his political ambitions and notability as a businessman. It is known that there were close ties between Czechoslovakia's StB and the USSR's KGB.

Harding also describes how, already since 1987, the Soviet Union was interested in Trump. In his book Collusion, Harding asserts that the "top level of the Soviet diplomatic service arranged his 1987 Moscow visit. With assistance from the KGB." Then-KGB head Vladimir Kryuchkov "wanted KGB staff abroad to recruit more Americans". Harding proceeds to describe the KGB's cultivation process, and posits that they may have opened a file on Trump as early as 1977, when he married Ivana. "According to files in Prague, declassified in 2016, Czech spies kept a close eye on the couple in Manhattan, ... [with] periodic surveillance of the Trump family in the United States."

Jonathan Chait has written that 1987 is a year when Russians courted and praised Trump by inviting him to consider building in Moscow. He then visited Moscow in July 1987, and was likely under surveillance, but he did not build anything.

=== Russian assistance to the Trump campaign ===
On April 26, 2016, George Papadopoulos, a Trump campaign foreign policy advisor, held a breakfast meeting with Joseph Mifsud, a man described by James B. Comey as a "Russian agent". Mifsud, who claimed "substantial connections to Russian officials", said he had "just returned from Moscow, where he had 'learned that the Russians had obtained 'dirt' on then-candidate Clinton." Mr. Mifsud said he had been told the Russians had "thousands of emails". This occurred concurrently with the Hillary Clinton email controversy, and long before the hacking of the DNC computers became public knowledge on June 14, 2016.

Papadopoulos later bragged "that the Trump campaign was aware the Russian government had dirt on Hillary Clinton". According to John Sipher, "court papers show he was, indeed, told by a Russian agent that the Kremlin had derogatory information in the form of 'thousands of e-mails'."

On May 4, the Russian contact with ties to the foreign ministry wrote to Mr. Papadopoulos and Mr. Mifsud, saying ministry officials were 'open for cooperation." Mr. Papadopoulos forwarded the message to a senior campaign official, asking whether the contacts were "something we want to move forward with.'

Papadopoulos sent emails about Putin to at least seven Trump campaign officials. Trump national campaign co-chairman Sam Clovis encouraged Papadopoulos to fly to Russia and meet with agents of the Russian Foreign Ministry, who reportedly wanted to share "Clinton dirt" with the Trump campaign. When Donald Trump Jr. learned of the offer, he welcomed it by responding: "If it's what you say, I love it." Later, on June 9, 2016, a meeting in Trump Tower was held, ostensibly for representatives from Russia to deliver that dirt on Clinton. Instead, the meeting was used to discuss lifting of the Magnitsky Act economic sanctions that had been imposed on Russia in 2012, a move favored by candidate Trump.

In February 2018, a formerly classified memo was released by Democrats on the House intelligence committee. The memo connects the offer of help made to Papadopoulos in London with a similar offer of help made to Carter Page when he met with Igor Divyekin in Moscow. Steele had told the FBI that he knew nothing of Papadopoulos when preparing the dossier, so this was independent confirmation of the Russian offer of help to the Trump campaign. The dossier alleged that when meeting with Carter Page, Igor Divyekin raised the possibility of releasing "a dossier of kompromat the Kremlin possessed on Democratic presidential rival, Hillary CLINTON ... to the Republican's campaign team". The memo stated that "This closely tracks what other Russian contacts were informing another Trump foreign policy advisor, George Papadopoulos. In subsequent FISA renewals, DOJ provided additional information obtained through multiple independent sources that corroborated Steele's reporting."

BBC correspondent Paul Wood wrote:

Steele was first to warn that Russia was mounting a covert operation to elect Donald Trump. Fusion GPS – his partners in Washington DC – have called this the dossier's 'foundational initial assertion' and it was correct. Much later, the Mueller inquiry would state that 'the Russian government perceived it would benefit from a Trump presidency and worked to secure that outcome.' Steele wrote about what was happening as early as June 2016...The US intelligence agencies...did not publish their findings until December 2016, too late to prevent the effort to influence the election.

On January 6, 2017, the Office of the Director of National Intelligence (ODNI) released the intelligence community assessment (ICA) of the Russian interference in the 2016 United States elections. It stated that Russian leadership favored Trump over Clinton, and that Putin personally ordered the whole interference operation, codenamed Project Lakhta, including an "influence campaign" to harm Clinton's electoral chances and "undermine public faith in the US democratic process", as well as ordering cyber attacks on the Democratic and Republican parties. John Brennan and James Clapper testified to Congress that Steele's dossier "played no role" in the intelligence community assessment about Russian interference in the 2016 election, testimony which was reaffirmed by an April 2020 bipartisan Senate Intelligence Committee report that found the dossier was not used to "support any of its analytic judgments".

There were conflicting opinions between the FBI and CIA on whether to include any of the dossier's allegations in the body of the ICA report, with the FBI pushing for inclusion, and the CIA countering that the dossier "was not completely vetted and did not merit inclusion in the body of the report". After much discussion, the CIA prevailed, and the final ICA report only included a short summary of Steele's reporting in the "highly classified" Annex A.

There were also other reasons to not include it, and CNN wrote that:

The intelligence agencies, particularly the CIA, and the FBI took Steele's research seriously enough that they kept it out of a publicly-released January report on Russian meddling in the election in order to not divulge which parts of the dossier they had corroborated and how. ... And if that report included the dossier allegations, the intelligence community would have to say which parts it had corroborated and how. That would compromise sources and methods, including information shared by foreign intelligence services, intelligence officials believed.

External videos
- 'Absurd': Fmr. CIA Director Brennan slams Trump's 'Russiagate' allegations, July 31, 2025, MSNBC

In July 2025, when the second Trump administration resumed attacks on the dossier, John Brennan, and others who contributed to the ODNI assessment, Brennan and Clapper responded in The New York Times:

[T]he dossier was not used as a source or taken into account for any of its analysis or conclusions. At the Federal Bureau of Investigation's insistence, a short summary of the dossier was added as a separate annex only to the most highly classified version of the document that contained the assessment. That annex also explained why the dossier was not used in the assessment.

Chuck Grassley provided that explanation: "We have only limited corroboration of source's [Steele's] reporting in this case and did not use it to reach the analytic conclusions of the CIA/FBI/NSA assessment."

The New York Times said "Parts of the dossier have proved prescient."

Its main assertion – that the Russian government was working to get Mr. Trump elected – was hardly an established fact when it was first laid out by Mr. Steele in June 2016. But it has since been backed up by the United States' own intelligence agencies – and Mr. Mueller's investigation. The dossier's talk of Russian efforts to cultivate some people in Mr. Trump's orbit was similarly unknown when first detailed in one of Mr. Steele's reports, but it has proved broadly accurate as well.

ABC News stated that "some of the dossier's broad implications—particularly that Russian President Vladimir Putin launched an operation to boost Trump and sow discord within the U.S. and abroad—now ring true."

The Mueller Report backed "Steele's central claim that the Russians ran a 'sweeping and systematic' operation ... to help Trump win". James Comey said:

The bureau began an effort after we got the Steele dossier to try and see how much of it we could replicate. That work was ongoing when I was fired. Some of it was consistent with our other intelligence, the most important part. The Steele dossier said the Russians are coming for the American election. It's a huge effort. It has multiple goals. ... And that was true.

Lawfare has noted that the "Mueller investigation has clearly produced public records that confirm pieces of the dossier. And even where the details are not exact, the general thrust of Steele's reporting seems credible in light of what we now know about extensive contacts between numerous individuals associated with the Trump campaign and Russian government officials."

In The New Yorker, Jane Mayer said the allegation that Trump was favored by the Kremlin, and that they offered Trump's campaign dirt on Clinton, has proven true. Mayer also wrote that the CIA had a Russian government official working as "a human source inside the Russian government during the campaign, who provided information that dovetailed with Steele's reporting about Russia's objective of electing Trump and Putin's direct involvement in the operation." The spy had access to Putin and could actually take pictures of documents on Putin's desk. Because of the dangers imposed by Trump's recent careless disclosures of classified information to Russian officials, the CIA feared their spy was in danger, so the government official and his family were discreetly exfiltrated during a family vacation to Montenegro.

In February 2019, Michael Cohen implicated Trump before the U.S. Congress, writing that in late July 2016, Trump had knowledge that Roger Stone was communicating with WikiLeaks about releasing emails stolen from the DNC in 2016. Stone denied this and accused Cohen of lying to Congress. Stone was later convicted before being pardoned by Trump, and it was confirmed that Stone had been in contact with WikiLeaks.

At the Helsinki summit meeting in July 2018, Putin was asked if he had wanted Trump to win the 2016 election. He responded "Yes, I did. Yes, I did. Because he talked about bringing the U.S.-Russia relationship back to normal."

"That the Russians interfered in the election in hopes of helping Trump win" has been described as the dossier's "core theme – later widely accepted by the news media and the U.S. intelligence community".

==== Fake news and social media misinformation ====
Source(s) for Report 166 alleged that "hackers ... had worked in Europe under Kremlin direction against the CLINTON campaign".

The Internet Research Agency (IRA) conducted an extensive campaign, including fake news and misinformation in social media, to undermine Clinton's campaign. On February 16, 2018, the IRA, along with 13 Russian individuals and two other Russian organizations, was indicted following an investigation by Special Counsel Robert Mueller with charges stemming from "impairing, obstructing, and defeating the lawful functions of government".

John Sipher reported on this dossier allegation and the documentation of the Russian efforts to harm Clinton. A January 2017 Stanford University study found that "fabricated stories favoring Donald Trump were shared a total of 30 million times, nearly quadruple the number of pro-Hillary Clinton shares leading up to the election." Researchers at Oxford University found that "An automated army of pro-Donald J. Trump chatbots overwhelmed similar programs supporting Hillary Clinton five to one in the days leading up to the presidential election." In March 2017, former FBI agent Clint Watts told Congress about websites involved in the Russian disinformation campaign "some of which mysteriously operate from Eastern Europe and are curiously led by pro-Russian editors of unknown financing". Aaron Blake examined two studies that indicate these efforts "made a significant difference...[and] may well have cost Clinton the presidency".

=== Manafort's and others' cooperation with Russian efforts ===
Dossier source(s) allege that Manafort, who had worked for Russian interests in Ukraine for many years, "managed" a "well-developed conspiracy of co-operation between [the Trump campaign] and the Russian leadership". The "conspiracy" is not proven, but the "co-operation" is seen as proven.

While the Mueller investigation did not "produce enough evidence" to prove the existence of a formal written or oral "conspiracy", some consider the actions of Manafort, Trump's welcoming of Russian help, and the myriad secret contacts between other Trump campaign members and associates with Russians to be the alleged "co-operation" with the Russian's "'sweeping and systematic' operation in 2016 to help Trump win", that The Guardian's Luke Harding and Dan Sabbagh describe as "Steele's central claim".

CNN described Manafort's role in its report of intercepted communications among "suspected Russian operatives discussing their efforts to work with Manafort ... to coordinate information that could damage Hillary Clinton's election prospects. ... The suspected operatives relayed what they claimed were conversations with Manafort, encouraging help from the Russians."

These reported intercepts are considered "remarkably consistent with the raw intelligence in the Steele Dossier ... [that] states that the 'well-developed conspiracy of co-operation between [the Trump campaign] and the Russian leadership ... was managed on the TRUMP side by the Republican candidate's campaign manager, Paul MANAFORT'."

=== Russian conversations confirmed ===
On February 10, 2017, CNN reported that:

For the first time, US investigators say they have corroborated some of the communications detailed in a 35-page dossier compiled by a former British intelligence agent, multiple current and former US law enforcement and intelligence officials tell CNN. ... The dossier details about a dozen conversations between senior Russian officials and other Russian individuals. ... But the intercepts do confirm that some of the conversations described in the dossier took place between the same individuals on the same days and from the same locations as detailed in the dossier, according to the officials. ... The corroboration, based on intercepted communications, has given US intelligence and law enforcement 'greater confidence' in the credibility of some aspects of the dossier as they continue to actively investigate its contents, these sources say.

=== "Pee tape" allegations ===
What Ashley Feinberg calls the "most salacious" rumor in the dossier concerns a urine-related rendezvous with Russian sex workers at the presidential suite of the Ritz-Carlton. There is no hard evidence that the "pee tape" exists. Danchenko stated in a 2020 interview that the source of the rumor was due to his raw intelligence gathering at the Ritz-Carlton, where he believed that staff corroborated the story he relayed to Steele that Trump had paid prostitutes to urinate in the bed that the Obamas had previously slept in.

According to the May 2023 Durham report: "[T]he Office [of Special Counsel] obtained records from the Ritz Carlton Moscow that reveal that Trump was a guest at the hotel in 2013, but did not stay in the Presidential Suite then or at any other time."

==== Moscow weekend, November 8‍–‍10, 2013 ====
The 2020 Senate Intelligence Committee report assessed the Ritz-Carlton Hotel in Moscow as a "high counterintelligence risk environment" with Russian intelligence on staff, "government surveillance of guests' rooms", and the common presence of prostitutes, "likely with at least the tacit approval of Russian authorities". A Marriott executive told the committee that after Trump's 2013 stay at the hotel, he overheard two hotel employees discussing what to do with an elevator surveillance video they said showed Trump "with several women" whom one of the employees "implied to be 'hostesses'". Committee investigators interviewed the two employees, but they said they could not recall the video.

Thomas Roberts, the host of the Miss Universe 2013 pageant, confirmed that "Trump was in Moscow for one full night and at least part of another." According to flight records, Keith Schiller's testimony, social media posts, and Trump's close friend, Aras Agalarov, Trump arrived by private jet on Friday morning, November 8, going to the Ritz-Carlton hotel and booking in.

The night of November 8–9, he attended Aras Agalarov's 58th birthday party at 10:00 p.m. He then left the birthday party early Saturday morning and, at about 1:30 a.m., Moscow time, returned to his hotel room with his bodyguard, Keith Schiller. While Trump and Schiller were walking back to Trump's hotel room, Schiller said he told Trump about an earlier offer to send five prostitutes "to Trump's hotel room that night", and Schiller said he told Trump he had rejected the offer. After Trump went to bed alone, Schiller said he stood outside Trump's door for a time and then left.

Ben Schreckinger reported in Politico that Comey wrote contemporaneous notes which stated that on two occasions, Trump had privately represented that he had not stayed overnight in Moscow on the night of November 8–9, when he had according to flight records. Trump later stated he did not make those statements, and disputed Comey's account. Comey and some commentators, such as Rubin, interpreted this at the time as reflective of a consciousness of guilt.

The morning of November 9, Facebook posts showed he was still at the Ritz-Carlton Hotel, and other sources document that he then had a busy day with various meetings and tours of Moscow. That evening he attended the Miss Universe pageant, followed by an after-party that started at 1:00 a.m. Then, without returning to his hotel, he flew back to the U.S.

==== Legacy of "pee tape" rumor ====
James Comey wrote in his book A Higher Loyalty: Truth, Lies, and Leadership that Trump asked him to have the FBI investigate the "pee tape" allegation "because he wanted to convince his wife that it wasn't true".

Regarding that allegation, Michael Isikoff and David Corn have stated that Steele's faith in the veracity of the rumor had faded, and he considered it a tossup. He considered it raw intelligence material, not strictly factual. In their 2019 book, the founders of Fusion GPS state that Steele received the "hotel anecdote" from seven Russian sources.

Slate journalist Ashley Feinberg investigated the pee tape rumor and linked to a fake 25-second video of the purported occurrence. She concluded that the fake was not obvious. According to Feinberg, the video apparently showed the presidential suite as it appeared after a 2015 renovation, despite the timing of the rumored occurrence being November 2013, before the renovation. The video had been in circulation since at least January 26, 2019.

The leaked Kremlin papers mentioned supposed kompromat on Trump, John Dobson, former British diplomat and Marc Bennetts, correspondent in Russia for The Times, observed.

In 2024, the Guardian reported that a UK court had rejected Trump's claims for damages from Orbis, over claims in the Steele dossier that he had paid prostitutes to urinate on each other in a bed in the presidential suite in a Moscow Ritz-Carlton. Trump sought damages for defamation, but it was outside the statute of limitations.

==== Trump's previous knowledge of compromising tapes ====
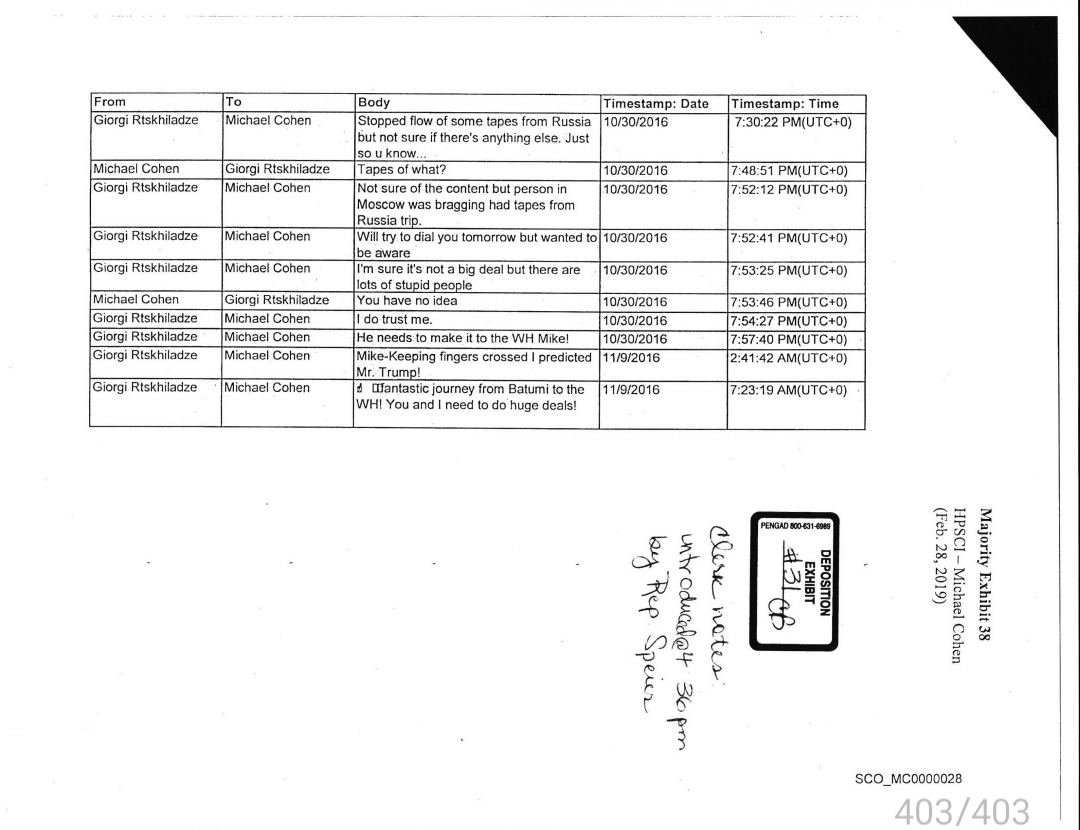
Exhibit 38. Texts between Rtskhiladze and Cohen starting on October 30, 2016.

The Senate Intelligence Committee report indicates that in late 2013 Trump learned of rumors about tapes of himself with prostitutes in Moscow, and "Footnote 112" in the Mueller Report suggests that Trump may have already heard that Russia had incriminating tapes of his behavior. "Footnote 112" describes how, on October 30, 2016, Michael Cohen exchanged a series of text messages ("Exhibit 38") with Giorgi Rtskhiladze, a friend and businessman who had worked with Cohen on Trump's real estate projects. Rtskhiladze reported that he had successfully "Stopped flow of some tapes from Russia but not sure if there's anything else. Just so u know. ..." Rtskhiladze told Mueller's investigators that these were "compromising tapes of Trump rumored to be held by persons associated with the Russian real estate conglomerate Crocus Group, which had helped host the 2013 Miss Universe Pageant in Russia." Cohen told investigators "he spoke to Trump about the issue after receiving the texts from Rtskhiladze".

Mueller's office "twice interviewed Rtskhiladze" (April 4, 2018, and May 10, 2018), and his story changed between interviews. "Footnote 112" covers both interviews. The footnote shows that Rtskhiladze later (May 10, 2018) changed his previous (April 4, 2018) testimony to Mueller by claiming that the "tapes were fake", but District Judge Christopher R. Cooper cast doubt on that claim. He said Rtskhiladze "undercut" his claim by speaking as if getting recorded was a real consequence of indiscretions committed around Agalarov/Crocus, and because Rtskhiladze's own words indicated "that the tapes may have been real":

As for Rtskhiladze's professed belief that the tapes were fake, that suggestion is somewhat undercut by Rtskhiladze's statement, only present in the Senate Report, suggesting that the tapes may have been real, and that they were 'what happens when you visit crocus I guess.'

Both Judge Cooper and the Senate Intelligence Committed seemed skeptical of the claim. The Senate report notes the lack of evidence for that claim in the partially blacked-out "Footnote 4281" that says "did not identify evidence of a later call from Khokhlov".

Cohen was deposed by the House Intelligence Committee, and he provided a history of the alleged tapes. He described the tapes stopped by Rtskhiladze as "the infamous pee tape when Mr. Trump was in Moscow for the Miss Universe Pageant". Cohen testified he became aware of the tape in "late 2013 or early 2014, shortly after the Miss Universe 2013 pageant and significantly prior to the 2016 U.S. election cycle" and told Trump about the rumor at that time. The Senate Report added that "Cohen ... would have been willing to pay [$20 million] ... to suppress the information if it could be verified, but Cohen was never shown any evidence."

In "2014 or 2015", after learning of the rumor, Cohen asked Rtskhiladze for help "to find out if the tape was real", and on October 30, 2016, Rtskhiladze contacted Cohen with news that he had succeeded in stopping the tapes.

When Representative Jackie Speier asked Cohen about the tape: "It wasn't infamous then, was it?" he replied: "Yes, yes. That the tape – the conversation about the tape has gone back almost a couple months past when they were there for the Miss Universe Pageant that that tape existed." When Speier asked "So you're suggesting you've known about the rumors about this tape for many years before October 30th?" he replied that he had talked to "many people" about the pee tape over the years.

It was only after the Steele dossier's publication in 2017 that Trump publicly excoriated the rumor, and claimed that the rumor originated with the dossier. In fact, Trump already knew about reports, "separate from" the much later Steele dossier, of "alleged compromising tapes of him in Moscow":

==== Role of Agalarovs ====
The Senate Intelligence Committee report implied that Aras Agalarov and his Crocus Group were part of a Russian intelligence effort to compromise and gain leverage over Trump.

On June 15, 2013, five months before the 2013 Miss Universe contest in Moscow, Trump was accompanied on a visit to the Las Vegas nightclub "The Act" by Crocus Group owner Aras Agalarov, his son Emin, Ike Kaveladze, Rob Goldstone, Michael Cohen, Keith Schiller, and others, where Trump was photographed and the group stayed "for several hours". The club featured "risque performances" and, according to Cohen, Trump watched a simulated golden showers performance with "disbelief and delight". As recounted by Mayer: "Isikoff and Corn note that ... they were unable to determine which skits were performed the night that Trump attended, or even whether Trump paid any attention to what was onstage." Mayer also cites an unnamed "source close to Steele" acknowledging: "'There's a risk that there was some conflation of the story,' meaning a blurring of what happened at the Act and what allegedly happened at the Moscow hotel. But at the same time, he noted, 'It does suggest that there is some kind of track record here. This behavior was not unheard of in Trump's circle.'"

The Agalarovs were also linked to several other events involving Trump, including the invitation to share "dirt" on Clinton at the Trump Tower meeting and knowledge of Trump's alleged sexual activities in Russia, both in St. Petersburg and the Moscow Ritz-Carlton. The dossier's sources reported that Aras Agalarov "would know most of the details of what the Republican presidential candidate had got up to" in St. Petersburg. In 2013, when Trump stayed at the Ritz-Carlton hotel, "multiple sources" reported that the offer to "send five women to Trump's hotel room that night" came from a Russian who was accompanying Emin Agalarov". A footnote in the Mueller Report describes how Giorgi Rtskhiladze reported that he had successfully stopped the "flow of ... compromising tapes of Trump rumored to be held by persons associated with the Russian real estate conglomerate Crocus Group" [owned by Agalarov].

==== Trump viewed as under Putin's influence ====
The press conference at the 2018 summit in Helsinki, Finland, on July 16, 2018 (English version) 46 minutes

Dossier source(s) allege that the Russians possess kompromat on Trump that can be used to blackmail him, and that the Kremlin promised him the kompromat will not be used as long as he continues his cooperation with them. Trump's actions at the Helsinki summit in 2018 "led many to conclude that Steele's report was more accurate than not. ... Trump sided with the Russians over the U.S. intelligence community's assessment that Moscow had waged an all-out attack on the 2016 election. ... The joint news conference ... cemented fears among some that Trump was in Putin's pocket and prompted bipartisan backlash."

At the joint press conference, when asked directly about the subject, Putin denied having any kompromat on Trump. Even though Trump was reportedly given a "gift from Putin" the weekend of the pageant, Putin argued "that he did not even know Trump was in Russia for the Miss Universe pageant in 2013 when, according to the Steele dossier, video of Trump was secretly recorded to blackmail him."

In reaction to Trump's actions at the summit, Senator Chuck Schumer (D-N.Y.) spoke in the Senate: "Millions of Americans will continue to wonder if the only possible explanation for this dangerous and inexplicable behavior is the possibility—the very real possibility—that President Putin holds damaging information over President Trump."

Several operatives and lawyers in the U.S. intelligence community reacted strongly to Trump's performance at the summit. They described it as "subservien[ce] to Putin" and a "fervent defense of Russia's military and cyber aggression around the world, and its violation of international law in Ukraine" which they saw as "harmful to US interests". They also suggested he was either a "Russian asset" or a "useful idiot" for Putin, and that he looked like "Putin's puppet". Former Director of National Intelligence James Clapper wondered "if Russians have something on Trump", and former CIA director John Brennan, who has accused Trump of "treason", tweeted: "He is wholly in the pocket of Putin."

Former acting CIA director Michael Morell has called Trump "an unwitting agent of the Russian federation", and former CIA director Michael V. Hayden said Trump was a "useful fool" who is "manipulated by Moscow". House Speaker Nancy Pelosi questioned Trump's loyalty when she asked him: "[Why do] all roads lead to Putin?"

Former KGB major Yuri Shvets asserts that Trump has been cultivated as an "asset" by Russian intelligence since 1977: "Russian intelligence gained an interest in Trump as far back as 1977, viewing Trump as an exploitable target."

Trump was not viewed as an actual agent (spy) but as an asset: "We're talking about Trump being a self-interested businessman who's happy to do a favour if it works to his own best interests."

Ynet, an Israeli online news site, reported on January 12, 2017, that U.S. intelligence advised Israeli intelligence officers to be cautious about sharing information with the incoming Trump administration, until the possibility of Russian influence over Trump, suggested by Steele's report, has been fully investigated.

Max Boot described what he sees as more "evidence of Trump's subservience to Putin", and he tied it to new government confirmations of rumors about Trump's alleged "dalliances with Russian women during visits to Moscow" that leave "him open to blackmail", rumors mentioned in the 2020 Senate Intelligence Committee report: While the Senate Intelligence Committee report extensively explored the possibility of Russian kompromat, much of the discussion was redacted in the public version of the report. Ultimately, the Senate Intelligence Committee "did not establish" that Russia had kompromat on Trump.

On the subject of kompromat, Bruce Ohr testified to the House Judiciary and Oversight committees that on July 30, 2016, Steele told him that "Russian intelligence believed 'they had Trump over a barrel' ... [a] broader sentiment [that] is echoed in Steele's dossier". Paul Wood described the source as "another Danchenko contact, a 'former senior intelligence officer now a Kremlin official'. This was later said to be no less than a former head of Russia's foreign intelligence services. This source did not talk specifically about the "pee tape" but, Danchenko told Steele, he said they had sexual kompromat on Trump going back years. 'We've got him over a barrel.'"

=== Kremlin's "Romanian" hackers and use of WikiLeaks, and Trump campaign reaction ===
Dossier source(s) allege that "Romanian hackers" controlled by Putin hacked the DNC servers and that the Trump campaign cooperated with Russia.

Russian hackers used the Guccifer 2.0 persona and claimed to be Romanian, like Marcel Lazar Lehel, the Romanian hacker who originally used the "Guccifer" pseudonym.

The Mueller Report confirmed that the dossier was correct that the Kremlin was behind the appearance of the DNC emails on WikiLeaks, noting that the Trump campaign "showed interest in WikiLeaks's releases of documents and welcomed their potential to damage candidate Clinton". It was later confirmed that Roger Stone was in contact with WikiLeaks.

==== Timing of release of hacked emails ====
Dossier source(s) allege that Carter Page "conceived and promoted" the idea of [the Russians] leaking the stolen DNC emails to WikiLeaks during the 2016 Democratic National Convention for the purpose of swinging supporters of Bernie Sanders "away from Hillary CLINTON and across to TRUMP". (Reports 95, 102)

In July 2016, in an "error-ridden message", WikiLeaks urged Russian intelligence to act swiftly to reach this timeline goal: "If you have anything hillary related we want it in the next tweo days prefable because the DNC is approaching, and she will solidify bernie supporters behind her after." The New York Times reported that Assange told Democracy Now! "he had timed their release to coincide with the Democratic convention".

The leaks started the day before the DNC national convention, a timing that was seen as suspicious by David Shedd, a former Director of the Defense Intelligence Agency, who said: "The release of emails just as the Democratic National Convention is getting underway this week has the hallmarks of a Russian active measures campaign."

=== Manafort and kickback payments from Yanukovych ===
Dossier source(s) allege that Russia-friendly president Yanukovych, whom Manafort advised for over a decade, had told Putin he had been making supposedly untraceable kickback payments to Manafort. After Yanukovych fled to Russia in 2014 under accusations of corruption, a secret "black ledger" was found in the former Party of Regions headquarters. It showed that Yanukovych and his ruling political party had set aside $12.7 million in illegal and undisclosed payments to Manafort for his work from 2007 to 2012. Manafort has denied receiving the payments. Manafort was accused of receiving $750,000 in "illegal, off-the-books payments from Ukraine's pro-Russian President Viktor Yanukovych before he was toppled".

From 2006 to at least 2009, Manafort had a $10 million annual contract with Putin ally and aluminum magnate, Oleg Deripaska, a contract under which Manafort had proposed he would "influence politics, business dealings and news coverage inside the United States, Europe and former Soviet republics to benefit President Vladimir Putin's government".

=== Page met with Rosneft officials ===
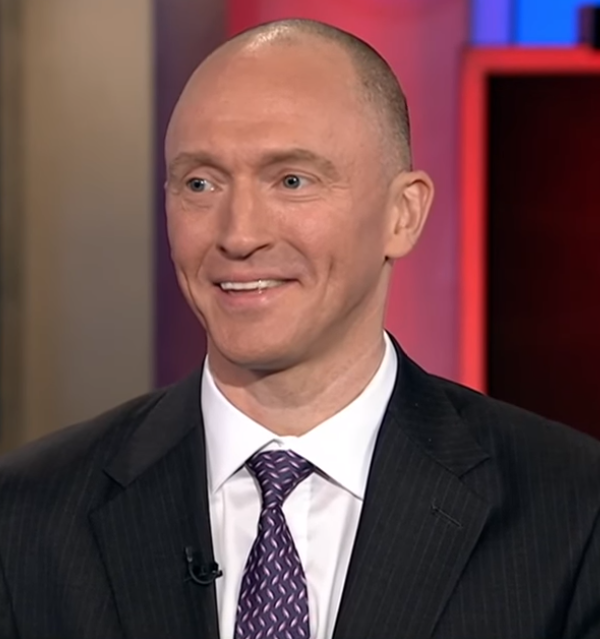
Carter Page (2017)

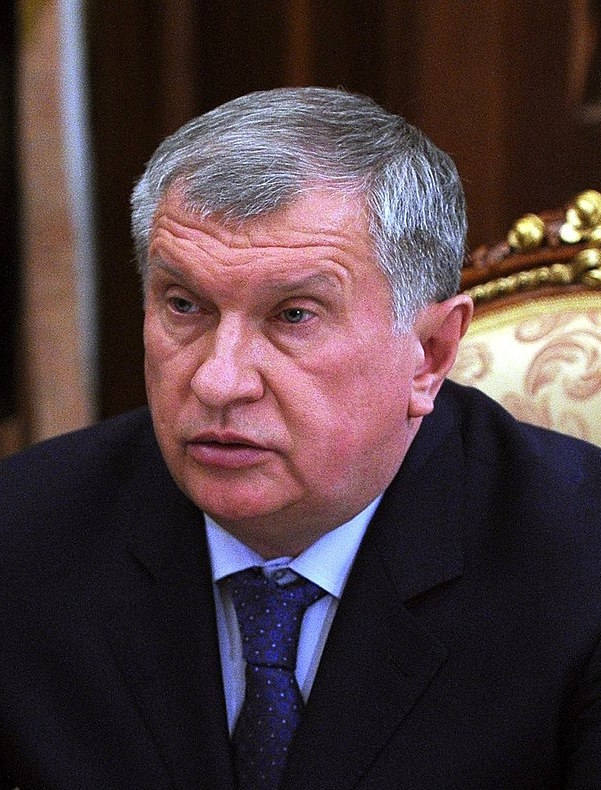
Igor Sechin (2016)

On November 2, 2017, Carter Page testified, without a lawyer, for more than six hours before the House Intelligence Committee that was investigating Russian interference in the 2016 U.S. elections. He testified about his five-day trip to Moscow in July 2016. According to his testimony, before leaving he informed Jeff Sessions, J. D. Gordon, Hope Hicks, and Corey Lewandowski, Trump's campaign manager, of the planned trip to Russia, and Lewandowski approved the trip, responding: "If you'd like to go on your own, not affiliated with the campaign, you know, that's fine."

Dossier source(s) allege that Page secretly met Rosneft chairman Igor Sechin on that July trip. Page denied meeting Sechin or any Russian officials during that trip, but he later admitted under oath that he met with Sechin's senior aide, Andrey Baranov, who was Rosneft's chief of investor relations. According to Harding, Baranov was "almost certainly" "relaying Sechin's wishes". David Corn and Michael Isikoff wrote that the FBI was not able to find evidence that Page met with Sechin or was offered a 19 percent stake in the giant energy conglomerate in exchange for the lifting of U.S. sanctions and that "Mueller's report noted that his 'activities in Russia ... were not fully explained'". Newsweek has listed the claim about Page meeting with Rosneft officials as "verified".

Jane Mayer said this part of the dossier seems true, even if the name of an official may have been wrong. Page's congressional testimony confirmed he met with Andrey Baranov, who was Rosneft's chief of investor relations, and Page conceded under questioning by Adam Schiff that the "potential sale of a significant percentage of Rosneft" might have been "briefly mentioned". However, Page insisted that "there was never any negotiations, or any quid pro quo, or any offer, or any request even, in any way related to sanctions".

CNN noted that his admissions to the House Intelligence Committee did confirm the Steele dossier was right about Page attending high-level meetings with Russians and possibly discussing "a sale of a stake in Rosneft", even though he denied doing so at the time. In April 2019, the Mueller Report concluded that their investigation did not establish that Page coordinated with Russia's interference efforts.

On February 11, 2021, Page lost a defamation suit he had filed against Yahoo! News and HuffPost for their articles that described his activities mentioned in the Steele dossier. According to Jeff Montgomery in Law360: "Judge Craig A Karsnitz ruled that the articles ... were either true or protected under Section 230 of the Communications Decency Act." Mike Leonard, writing for Bloomberg Law, quoted Judge Karsnitz: "The article simply says that U.S. intelligence agencies were investigating reports of plaintiff's meetings with Russian officials, which Plaintiff admits is true."

==== Brokerage of Rosneft privatization ====
Dossier source(s) allege that Sechin "offered PAGE/TRUMP's associates the brokerage of up to a 19 per cent (privatised) stake in Rosneft" (worth about $11 billion) in exchange for Trump lifting the sanctions against Russia after his election.

According to Harding, Sechin and Divyekin set this offer up as a carrot and stick scheme, in which the carrot was the brokerage fee ("in the region of tens and possibly hundreds of millions of dollars"), and the stick was blackmail over purported "damaging material on Trump" held by the Russian leadership.

About a month after Trump won the election, according to The Guardian, Carter Page traveled to Moscow "shortly before the company announced it was selling a 19.5% stake" in Rosneft. He met with top Russian officials at Rosneft but denied meeting Sechin. He also complained about the effects of the sanctions against Russia.

On December 7, 2016, Putin announced that a 19.5% stake in Rosneft was sold to Glencore and a Qatar fund. Public records showed the ultimate owner included "a Cayman Islands company whose beneficial owners cannot be traced", with "the main question" being "Who is the real buyer of a 19.5 percent stake in Rosneft? ... the Rosneft privatization uses a structure of shell companies owning shell companies."

Michael Horowitz's 2019 inspector general report "said Steele's claims about Page 'remained uncorroborated' when the wiretaps ended in 2017".

==== Trump's attempts to lift sanctions ====
The dossier says Page, claiming to speak with Trump's authority, had confirmed that Trump would lift the existing sanctions against Russia if he were elected president. On December 29, 2016, during the transition period between the election and the inauguration, National Security Advisor designate Flynn spoke to Russian Ambassador Sergei Kislyak, urging him not to retaliate for newly imposed sanctions; the Russians took his advice and did not retaliate.

Within days after the inauguration, new Trump administration officials ordered State Department staffers to develop proposals for immediately revoking the economic and other sanctions. One retired diplomat later said, "What was troubling about these stories is that suddenly I was hearing that we were preparing to rescind sanctions in exchange for, well, nothing." The staffers alerted Congressional allies who took steps to codify the sanctions into law. The attempt to overturn the sanctions was abandoned after Flynn's conversation was revealed and Flynn resigned. In August 2017, Congress passed a bipartisan bill to impose new sanctions on Russia. Trump reluctantly signed the bill but then refused to implement it. After Trump hired Manafort, his approach toward Ukraine changed; he said he might recognize Crimea as Russian territory and might lift the sanctions against Russia.

Among those sanctioned were Russian oligarchs like Oleg Deripaska, "who is linked to Paul Manafort", parliament member Konstantin Kosachev, banker Aleksandr Torshin, and Putin's son-in-law. Preparation for the sanctions started already before Trump took office. In January 2019, Trump's Treasury Department lifted the sanctions on companies formerly controlled by Deripaska. Sanctions on Deripaska himself remained in effect.

=== Cohen and alleged Prague visit ===
Dossier source(s) allege that Cohen and three colleagues met Kremlin officials in the Prague offices of Rossotrudnichestvo in August 2016, to arrange for payments to the hackers, cover up the hack, and "cover up ties between Trump and Russia, including Manafort's involvement in Ukraine". McClatchy reported in 2018 that a phone of Cohen's was traced to the Prague area in late summer 2016. The April 2019 Mueller Report states "Cohen had never traveled to Prague". The December 2019 Horowitz Report stated that the FBI "concluded that these allegations against Cohen" in the dossier "were not true".

According to the Wall Street Journal, Olga Galkina was Steele's source for the hacking accusations against Webzilla, and the source of the allegations about a secret meeting in Prague involving Michael Cohen and three colleagues.

In April 2018, McClatchy DC Bureau, citing two sources, reported that investigators working for Mueller "have traced evidence that Cohen entered the Czech Republic through Germany, apparently during August or early September 2016", a claim that The Spectator reported in July 2018 was "backed up by one intelligence source in London".

In August 2018, The Spectator reported that "one intelligence source" said "Mueller is examining 'electronic records' that would place Cohen in Prague." In December 2018, McClatchy reported that a phone of Cohen's had "pinged" cellphone towers in the Prague area in late summer 2016, citing four sources, leading to foreign intelligence detecting the pings. McClatchy also reported that during that time an Eastern European intelligence agency had intercepted communications between Russians, one of whom mentioned that Cohen was in Prague.

The Washington Post sent a team of reporters to Prague in an attempt to verify that Cohen had been there for the purposes alleged in the Dossier. According to reporter Greg Miller in November 2018, they "came away empty".

In April 2019, The New York Times reported that when the FBI attempted to verify the dossier's claims, the Prague allegation "appeared to be false", as "Cohen's financial records and C.I.A. queries to foreign intelligence services revealed nothing to support it."

Also in April 2019, the Mueller Report mentioned that "Cohen had never traveled to Prague" and presented no evidence of the alleged Prague meeting, thus contradicting the dossier and the McClatchy report. Glenn Kessler, fact-checker for The Washington Post, has said that "Mueller does not indicate he investigated whether Cohen traveled to Prague; he simply dismisses the incident in Cohen's own words". McClatchy responded to the Mueller Report by stating that it did not refer to evidence that Cohen's phone had pinged in or near Prague. McClatchy stood by its December 2018 reporting, stating that there was a "possibility that Cohen was not there but one of the many phones he used was".

The Associated Press described a December 2019 Horowitz Report mention of an inaccuracy in the dossier regarding Michael Cohen that may have been the Prague allegation. Matt Taibbi wrote that news reports of the Cohen-Prague allegation were "either incorrect or lacking factual foundation". CNN interpreted the Horowitz Report as saying that the dossier's Cohen-Prague allegation was untrue.

In August 2020, the testimony of David Kramer was publicized, where he said Steele was uncertain about the "alleged Cohen trip to Prague". Kramer said: "it could have been in Prague, it could have been outside of Prague. He also thought there was a possibility it could have been in Budapest ... [but Steele] never backed off the idea that Cohen was in Europe." In October 2021, "When asked why Cohen would not admit to the alleged meeting despite already being convicted of other crimes, Steele replied: 'I think it's so incriminating and demeaning. ... And the other reason is he might be scared of the consequences'."

=== Republican position on Russian conflict with Ukraine and related sanctions ===
In 2015, Trump had taken a hard line in favor of Ukraine's independence from Russia. He initially denounced Russia's annexation of Crimea as a "land grab" that "should never have happened", and called for a firmer U.S. response, saying "We should definitely be strong. We should definitely do sanctions."

With the hirings of Paul Manafort and Carter Page, Trump's approach toward Ukraine reversed. Manafort had worked for Russian interests in Ukraine for many years, and after hiring Manafort as his campaign manager, Trump said he might recognize Crimea as Russian territory and might lift the sanctions against Russia. At the time Trump appointed Carter Page as a foreign policy advisor, Page was known as an outspoken and strongly pro-Russian, anti-sanctions person whose views aligned with Trump's, and who had complained that his own, as well as his Russian friends', business interests were negatively affected by the sanctions imposed on Russia because of its aggression in Ukraine and its interference in the 2016 elections.

Dossier source(s) allege that "the Trump campaign agreed to minimize US opposition to Russia's incursions into Ukraine". Harding considers this allegation to have been confirmed by the actions of the Trump campaign: "This is precisely what happened at the Republican National Convention last July, when language on the US's commitment to Ukraine was mysteriously softened." The Washington Post reported that "the Trump campaign orchestrated a set of events" in July 2016 "to soften the language of an amendment to the Republican Party's draft policy on Ukraine." In July 2016, the Republican National Convention did make changes to the Republican Party's platform on Ukraine: initially the platform proposed providing "lethal weapons" to Ukraine, but the line was changed to "appropriate assistance".

NPR reported that "Diana Denman, a Republican delegate who supported arming U.S. allies in Ukraine, has told people that Trump aide J.D. Gordon said at the Republican Convention in 2016 that Trump directed him to support weakening that position in the official platform." J. D. Gordon, who was one of Trump's national security advisers during the campaign, said he had advocated for changing language because that reflected what Trump had said. Although the Trump team denied any role in softening the language, Denman confirmed that the change "definitely came from Trump staffers".

Kyle Cheney of Politico sees evidence that the change was "on the campaign's radar" because Carter Page congratulated campaign members in an email the day after the platform amendment: "As for the Ukraine amendment, excellent work." Paul Manafort falsely said that the change "absolutely did not come from the Trump campaign". Trump told George Stephanopoulos that people in his campaign were responsible for changing the Republican party's platform stance on Ukraine, but he denied personal involvement.

=== Relations with Europe and NATO ===
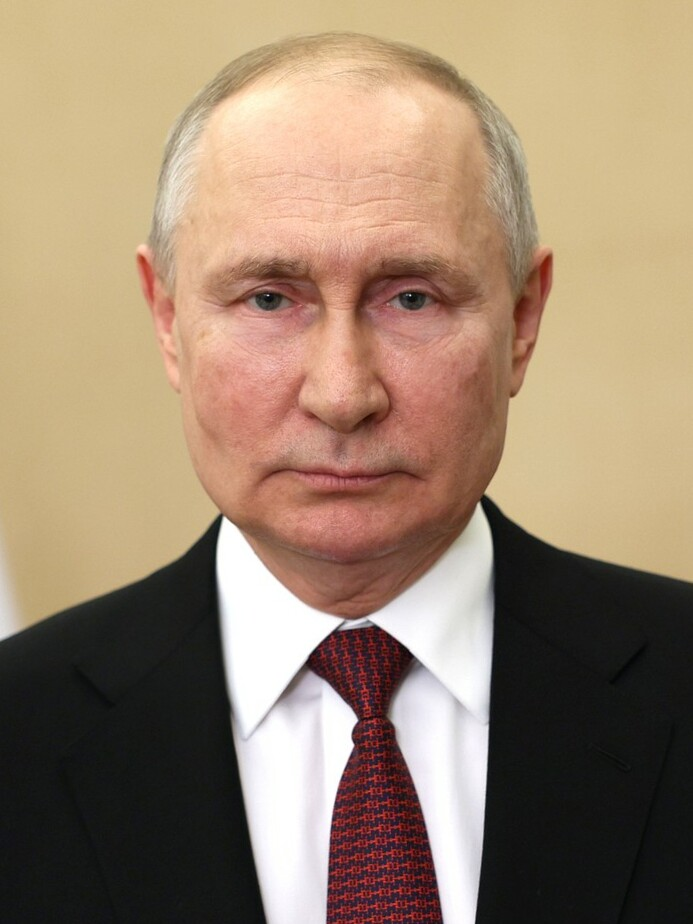
Vladimir Putin (2023)

Dossier source(s) allege that, as part of a quid pro quo agreement, "the TRUMP team had agreed ... to raise US/NATO defense commitments in the Baltics and Eastern Europe to deflect attention away from Ukraine, a priority for PUTIN who needed to cauterise the subject." Aiko Stevenson, writing in HuffPost, noted that some of Trump's actions seem to align with "Putin's wish list", that "includes lifting sanctions on Russia, turning a blind eye towards its aggressive efforts in the Ukraine, and creating a divisive rift amongst western allies." During the campaign Trump "called NATO, the centrepiece of Transatlantic security, 'obsolete', championed the disintegration of the EU, and said that he is open to lifting sanctions on Moscow." Harding adds that Trump repeatedly "questioned whether US allies were paying enough into Nato coffers".

Nancy LeTourneau tied dossier allegations with Trump's attacks on NATO and reminded readers of "what Vladimir Putin wanted when, back in about 2011, he started courting Donald Trump as basically a Russian asset". She then quoted the dossier:

[The Trump operation's] aim was to sow discord and disunity within the U.S. itself, but more especially within the Transatlantic alliance which was viewed as inimical to Russia's interests. Source C, a senior Russian financial official, said the Trump operation should be seen in terms of Putin's desire to return to Nineteenth Century 'Great Power' politics anchored upon countries' interests rather than the ideals-based international order established after World War Two.

Trump's appearances at meetings with allies, including NATO and G7, have frequently been antagonistic; according to the Los Angeles Times, "The president's posture toward close allies has been increasingly and remarkably confrontational this year, especially in comparison to his more conciliatory approach to adversaries, including Russia and North Korea."

=== Spy withdrawn from Russian embassy ===
Dossier source(s) allege that "a leading Russian diplomat, Mikhail KULAGIN" [sic] participated in U.S. election meddling, and was recalled to Moscow because the Kremlin was concerned his role in the meddling would be exposed. The BBC later reported that U.S. officials in 2016 had identified Russian diplomat Mikhail Kalugin as a spy and that he was under surveillance, thus "verifying" a key claim in the dossier. Kalugin was the head of the economics section at the Russian embassy. He returned to Russia in August 2016. McClatchy reported that the FBI was investigating whether Kalugin played a role in the election interference. Kalugin has denied the allegations.

=== Botnets and porn traffic by hackers ===
The validity of the accusation that Aleksej Gubarev's "XBT/Webzilla and its affiliates had been using botnets and porn traffic to transmit viruses, plant bugs, steal data and conduct 'altering operations' against the Democratic Party leadership" has been affirmed by an unsealed report by FTI Consulting, which was commissioned by BuzzFeed for use in the defamation suit(s) Gubarev had filed against others.

The report by FTI Consulting said:

Mr. Gubarev's companies have provided gateways to the internet for cybercriminals and Russian state-sponsored actors to launch and control large scale malware campaigns over the past decade. Gubarev and other XBT executives do not appear to actively prevent cybercriminals from using their infrastructure.

Cybersecurity and intelligence expert Andrew Weisburd has said both Gubarev and the dossier "can be right": "Their explanation is entirely plausible, as is the Steele Dossier's description of Mr. Gubarev as essentially a victim of predatory officers of one or more Russian intelligence services. ... Neither BuzzFeed nor Steele have accused Gubarev of being a willing participant in wrongdoing." XBT has denied the allegations, and "findings do not prove or disprove claims made about XBT in the dossier, but show how the company could have been used by cyber criminals, wittingly or unwittingly".

According to the Wall Street Journal, Steele's source for the hacking accusations against Webzilla was Olga Galkina, who was involved in a "messy dispute" with the firm "after being fired in November 2016".

== Dossier's veracity and Steele's reputation ==
While many parts of the dossier are unverified and some are possibly false or misinformation, the finding that the Kremlin had tried to influence the 2016 campaign, the main narrative of the dossier, has been corroborated.

Steele and the dossier became a political football. Opinions on Steele became polarized. Glenn Kessler described the dossier as "a political Rorschach test." According to Barry Meier, some MI6 officials said that Steele "had a tendency to become obsessed and go down rabbit holes chasing targets of questionable value".

Following the dossier's release, Steele completely avoided on-camera interviews until he participated in an ABC News documentary that was aired on Hulu on October 18, 2021. In that documentary, Steele maintained that his sources were credible and that it was typical in intelligence investigations to "never get to the point where you're 99% certain of the evidence to secure a conviction". Steele also acknowledged that one of his sources had faced repercussions; he confirmed that the source was still alive, but he would not provide further details.

In some cases, public verification is hindered because the information is classified.

After the Mueller Report was released, Joshua Levy, counsel for Fusion GPS, issued this statement:

The Mueller Report substantiates the core reporting and many of the specifics in Christopher Steele's 2016 memoranda, including that Trump campaign figures were secretly meeting Kremlin figures, that Russia was conducting a covert operation to elect Donald Trump, and that the aim of the Russian operation was to sow discord and disunity in the US and within the Transatlantic Alliance. To our knowledge, nothing in the Steele memoranda has been disproven.

The Inspector General investigation by Michael E. Horowitz, published December 9, 2019, expressed doubts about the dossier's reliability and sources:

The FBI concluded, among other things, that although consistent with known efforts by Russia to interfere in the 2016 U.S. elections, much of the material in the Steele election reports, including allegations about Donald Trump and members of the Trump campaign relied upon in the Carter Page FISA applications, could not be corroborated; that certain allegations were inaccurate or inconsistent with information gathered by the Crossfire Hurricane team; and that the limited information that was corroborated related to time, location, and title information, much of which was publicly available.

According to the May 2023 Durham report, "the FBI was not able to corroborate a single substantive allegation contained in the Steele Reports, despite protracted efforts to do so."

=== Reputation in the U.S. intelligence community ===
The process of evaluating Steele's information has been explained by Bill Priestap, at the time the Assistant Director of the FBI Counterintelligence Division:

We did not ever take the information he provided at face value. ... We went to great lengths to try to independently verify the source's credibility and to prove or disprove every single assertion in the dossier. ... We absolutely understood that the information in the so-called dossier could be inaccurate. We also understood that some parts could be true and other parts false. We understood that information could be embellished or exaggerated. We also understood that the information could have been provided by the Russians as part of a disinformation campaign.

"Independent evidence about Trump as a potential victim of sexual blackmail emerged soon after the publication of the dossier." On January 12, 2017, Paul Wood, of BBC News, wrote that Steele was "not the only source" for claims about Russian kompromat on Trump and that multiple intelligence sources were privately reporting about it before the publication of the dossier:

Back in August, a retired spy told me he had been informed of its existence by 'the head of an East European intelligence agency'. Later, I used an intermediary to pass some questions to active duty CIA officers dealing with the case file – they would not speak to me directly. I got a message back that there was "more than one tape", "audio and video", on "more than one date", in "more than one place" – in the Ritz-Carlton in Moscow and also in St Petersburg – and that the material was "of a sexual nature". The claims of Russian kompromat on Mr Trump were "credible", the CIA believed.

While also mentioning that "nobody should believe something just because an intelligence agent says it", Wood added that "the CIA believes it is credible that the Kremlin has such kompromat—or compromising material—on the next US commander in chief" and "a joint taskforce, that includes the CIA and the FBI, has been investigating allegations that the Russians may have sent money to Mr Trump's organisation or his election campaign".

On January 12, 2017, Susan Hennessey, a former National Security Agency lawyer now with the Brookings Institution, said: "My general take is that the intelligence community and law enforcement seem to be taking these claims seriously. That itself is highly significant. But it is not the same as these allegations being verified. Even if this was an intelligence community document—which it isn't—this kind of raw intelligence is still treated with skepticism." Hennessey and Benjamin Wittes wrote that "the current state of the evidence makes a powerful argument for a serious public inquiry into this matter".

On February 10, 2017, CNN reported that some communications between "senior Russian officials and other Russian individuals" described in the dossier had been corroborated by multiple U.S. officials. They "took place between the same individuals on the same days and from the same locations as detailed in the dossier". Some persons were known to be "heavily involved" in collecting information that could hurt Clinton and aid Trump. CNN was unable to confirm whether the conversations were related to Trump. Sources told CNN some conversations had been "intercepted during routine intelligence gathering", but refused to reveal the content of conversations or specify which communications were intercepted because the information was classified. U.S. officials said the corroboration gave "US intelligence and law enforcement 'greater confidence' in the credibility of some aspects of the dossier as they continue to actively investigate its contents". They also reported that American intelligence agencies had examined Steele and his "vast network throughout Europe and found him and his sources to be credible".

On March 30, 2017, Paul Wood reported that the FBI was using the dossier as a roadmap for its investigation. On January 13, 2019, Sonam Sheth reported that the Senate Intelligence Committee was also using it as a roadmap for their investigation into Russia's election interference.

On April 18, 2017, CNN reported that, according to U.S. officials, information from the dossier had been used as part of the basis for getting the FISA warrant to monitor Page in October 2016. The Justice Department's inspector general revealed in 2019 that in the six weeks prior to its receipt of Steele's memos, the FBI's Crossfire Hurricane team "had discussions about the possibility of obtaining FISAs targeting Page and Papadopoulos, but it was determined that there was insufficient information at the time to proceed with an application to the court." The IG report described a changed situation after the FBI received Steele's memos and said the dossier then played a central and essential role in the seeking of FISA warrants on Carter Page: "FBI and Department officials told us the Steele reporting 'pushed [the FISA proposal] over the line' in terms of establishing probable cause."

Officials told CNN this information would have had to be independently corroborated by the FBI before being used to obtain the warrant, but CNN later reported "it's now clear that this level of verification never materialized". Steele told the FBI that Person 1 was a "boaster" and "egoist" who "may engage in some embellishment", "caveats about his source" that the FBI omitted from its FISA application. In his testimony before Congress, Glenn Simpson "confirmed that the FBI had sources of its own and that whatever the FBI learned from Steele was simply folded into its ongoing work".

The Senate Intelligence Committee criticized the FBI and found the FBI gave the allegations "unjustified credence" before first understanding "Steele's past reporting record":

Regarding the Steele Dossier, FBI gave Steele's allegations unjustified credence, based on an incomplete understanding of Steele's past reporting record. FBI used the Dossier in a FISA application and renewals and advocated for it to be included in the ICA before taking the necessary steps to validate assumptions about Steele's credibility. Further, FBI did not effectively adjust its approach to Steele's reporting once one of Steele's subsources provided information that raised serious concerns about the source descriptions in the Steele Dossier. The Committee further found that Steele's reporting lacked rigor and transparency about the quality of the sourcing.

British journalist Julian Borger wrote on October 7, 2017, that "Steele's reports are being taken seriously after lengthy scrutiny by federal and congressional investigators", at least Steele's assessment that Russia had conducted a campaign to interfere in the 2016 election to Clinton's detriment; that part of the Steele dossier "has generally gained in credibility, rather than lost it".

On October 11, 2017, it was reported that Senator Sheldon Whitehouse (D-Rhode Island), a member of the Senate Judiciary Committee (SJC), had said: "As I understand it, a good deal of his information remains unproven, but none of it has been disproven, and considerable amounts of it have been proven."

On October 25, 2017, James Clapper said that "some of the substantive content of the dossier we were able to corroborate in our Intelligence Community assessment which from other sources in which we had very high confidence."

On October 27, 2017, Robert S. Litt, a former lawyer for the Director of National Intelligence, was quoted as stating the dossier "played absolutely no role" in the intelligence community's determination that Russia had interfered in the 2016 U.S. presidential election.

On November 15, 2017, Adam Schiff said much of the dossier's content is about Russian efforts to help Trump, and those allegations "turned out to be true", something later affirmed by the January 6, 2017, intelligence community assessment released by the ODNI.

On December 7, 2017, commentator Jonathan Chait wrote that as "time goes by, more and more of the claims first reported by Steele have been borne out", with the mainstream media "treat[ing] [the dossier] as gossip" whereas the intelligence community "take it seriously".

On January 29, 2018, a House Intelligence Committee minority report stated that "multiple independent sources ... corroborated Steele's reporting".

On January 29, 2018, Mark Warner, the top Democrat on the Senate Intelligence Committee, said "little of that dossier has either been fully proven or conversely, disproven".

John Sipher, who served 28 years as a clandestine CIA agent, including heading the agency's Russia program, said investigating the allegations requires access to non-public records. He said "[p]eople who say it's all garbage, or all true, are being politically biased", adding he believes that while the dossier may not be correct in every detail, it is "generally credible" and "In the intelligence business, you don't pretend you're a hundred per cent accurate. If you're seventy or eighty per cent accurate, that makes you one of the best." He said the Mueller investigation would ultimately judge its merits. Sipher has written that "Many of my former CIA colleagues have taken the [dossier] reports seriously since they were first published."

During his April 15, 2018, ABC News interview with George Stephanopoulos, former FBI Director James Comey described Steele as a "credible source, someone with a track record, someone who was a credible and respected member of an allied intelligence service during his career, and so it was important that we try to understand it, and see what could we verify, what could we rule in or rule out."

In May 2018, former career intelligence officer James Clapper believed that "more and more" of the dossier had been validated over time.

James Comey told the Office of the Inspector General that:

in his view, the "heart of the [Steele] reporting was that there's a massive Russian effort to influence the American election and weaponize stolen information." Comey said he believed those themes from the Steele reporting were "entirely consistent with information developed by the [USIC] wholly separate and apart from the [Steele] reporting", as well as consistent with what "our eyes and ears could also see".

When DOJ Inspector General Michael E. Horowitz issued a report in December 2019 on the Crossfire Hurricane investigation, the report noted that the "FBI Intel Section Chief told us that the CIA viewed the Steele reporting as 'internet rumor'".

=== Varied observations of dossier's veracity ===
Steele, the author of the dossier, said he believes that 70–90% of the dossier is accurate, although he gives the "golden showers" allegation a 50% chance of being true. In testimony to Congress, Simpson quoted "Steele as saying that any intelligence, especially from Russia, is bound to carry intentional disinformation, but that Steele believes his dossier is 'largely not disinformation'." Steele has countered the suggestion that the Russians deliberately fed his sources misinformation that would undermine Trump: "The ultimate Russian goal was to prevent Hillary Clinton from becoming president, and therefore, the idea that they would intentionally spread embarrassing information about Trump—true or not—is not logical."

Other observers and experts have had varying reactions to the dossier. Generally, when the dossier was released with its "explosive, but largely unverified, claims", "former intelligence officers and other national-security experts" urged "skepticism and caution" but still took "the fact that the nation's top intelligence officials chose to present a summary version of the dossier to both President Obama and President-elect Trump" as an indication "that they may have had a relatively high degree of confidence that at least some of the claims therein were credible, or at least worth investigating further".

Vice President Joe Biden told reporters that, while he and Obama were receiving a briefing on the extent of election hacking attempts, there was a two-page addendum that addressed the contents of the Steele dossier. Top intelligence officials told them they "felt obligated to inform them about uncorroborated allegations about President-elect Donald Trump out of concern the information would become public and catch them off-guard".

On January 11, 2017, Newsweek published a list of "13 things that don't add up" in the dossier, writing that it was a "strange mix of the amateur and the insightful" and stating that it "contains lots of Kremlin-related gossip that could indeed be, as the author claims, from deep insiders—or equally gleaned" from Russian newspapers and blogs. Former UK ambassador to Russia Sir Tony Brenton said certain aspects of the dossier were inconsistent with British intelligence's understanding of how the Kremlin works, commenting: "I've seen quite a lot of intelligence on Russia, and there are some things in [the dossier] which look pretty shaky."

In his June 2017 Senate Intelligence Committee testimony, former FBI director James Comey said "some personally sensitive aspects" of the dossier were "salacious and unverified" when he briefed Trump on them on January 6, 2017. Comey also said he could not say publicly whether any of the allegations in the dossier had been confirmed.

Trump and his supporters have challenged the veracity of the dossier because it was funded in part by the Clinton campaign and the DNC, while Democrats assert the funding source is irrelevant.

In November 2019, the founders of Fusion GPS published a book about the dossier and had this to say about its veracity:

After three years of investigations, a fair assessment of the memos would conclude that many of the allegations in the dossier have been borne out. Some proved remarkably prescient. Other details remain stubbornly unconfirmed, while a handful now appear to be doubtful, though not yet disproven.

David A. Graham of The Atlantic has noted that in spite of Trump's "mantra that 'there was no collusion' ... it is clear that the Trump campaign and later transition were eager to work with Russia, and to keep that secret."

Trump and Barr claimed that Mueller exonerated Trump and that there was "no collusion", but those claims were false:

As Mueller made clear in the public statement he offered Wednesday – his first of substance since being appointed as special counsel – Trump's summary was not an accurate one. The special counsel's report explicitly rejected analysis of "collusion," a vague term that lacks a legal meaning. Instead of a lack of "collusion" between Trump's campaign and Russia, Mueller said that "there was insufficient evidence to charge a broader conspiracy."

Former CIA Director John Brennan stated that Trump's claims of "no collusion" with Russia were "hogwash":

The only questions that remain are whether the collusion that took place constituted criminally liable conspiracy, whether obstruction of justice occurred to cover up any collusion or conspiracy, and how many members of 'Trump Incorporated' attempted to defraud the government by laundering and concealing the movement of money into their pockets.

Adam Goldman and Charlie Savage of The New York Times have described the impact of some of the flaws in the dossier:

But its flaws have taken on outsized political significance, as Mr. Trump's allies have sought to conflate it with the larger effort to understand Russia's covert efforts to tilt the 2016 election in his favor and whether any Trump campaign associates conspired in that effort. Mr. Mueller laid out extensive details about Russia's covert operation and contacts with Trump campaign associates but found insufficient evidence to bring any conspiracy charges.

On October 17, 2021, in Steele's first major interview with ABC News, George Stephanopoulos asked him if he thought the "pee tape" was real. Steele answered that it "probably does exist", but he "wouldn't put 100 percent certainty on it". When he was asked why the Russians hadn't released it, he replied "It hasn't needed to be released. ... I think the Russians felt they'd got pretty good value out of Donald Trump when he was president of the U.S."

== Investigations ==
On July 31, 2016, the existing FBI investigation into suspicious Russian activities and election interference suddenly morphed into the creation of the Crossfire Hurricane investigation into possible Trump campaign involvement in the Russian interference. Neither investigation was triggered by the dossier,

In January 2018, ABC News described how the FBI would not open an investigation into the Trump campaign based on one document like Steele's unverified report but the FBI still needed to investigate its allegations "rather than accept them as evidence". The Russian interference investigation was opened because of previously existing concerns: John Brennan testified he was already "aware of intelligence and information about contacts between Russian officials and U.S. persons that raised concerns" and it was that knowledge that "served as the basis for the FBI investigation to determine whether such collusion [or] cooperation occurred". ABC wrote that "For the FBI, the dossier was essentially just another tip" that must be investigated.

The Mueller Report, a summary of the findings of the Special Counsel investigation into Russian interference in the 2016 U.S. elections, contained passing references to some of the dossier's allegations but little mention of its more sensational claims. It was a major subject of the Nunes memo, the Democratic rebuttal memo, and the Inspector General report on the Crossfire Hurricane investigation.

The investigations led to Fusion GPS founder Glenn Simpson being interviewed in August 2017 by Congress.

John Durham has been investigating whether FBI agents "mishandled classified information" about operation Crossfire Hurricane when they questioned Steele. The IG report documents that a case agent mentioned Papadopoulos to Steele. The FBI has no "established guidelines for how to address the disclosure of sensitive or classified information to sources", and the Inspector General "concluded that the case agent should not be faulted".

Durham sought to get more information by seeking access to evidence gathered in a British lawsuit filed by the founders of Alfa-Bank. Durham's efforts were only partially successful. A July 21, 2020, court filing shows that Durham has sought the lifting of "a protective order on evidence that had been gathered". Politico wrote that legal experts said this move was "highly unusual ... and suggests the British government was not involved in, or cooperating with, Durham's criminal investigation".

== Conspiracy theories and claims about dossier ==
=== Conspiracy theory it was trigger for start of investigation ===
The Russia investigation origins conspiracy theory is a disproven right-wing alternative narrative, sometimes identified as a set of conspiracy theories, concerning the origins of the original Crossfire Hurricane investigation and the following Special Counsel investigation into Russian interference in the 2016 United States elections. The theory asserts that Trump "was targeted by politically biased Obama officials to prevent his election", and that the Steele dossier triggered the Russia probe. These conspiracy theories have been pushed by Trump, Fox News, Republican politicians like Representative Jim Jordan (R-Ohio), Trump's Director of National Intelligence John Ratcliffe, and Trump's Attorney General William Barr.

In spite of these allegations, on November 2, 2020, the day before the presidential election, New York magazine reported that:

there has been no evidence found, after 18 months of investigation, to support Barr's claims that Trump was targeted by politically biased Obama officials to prevent his election. (The probe remains ongoing.) In fact, the sources said, the Durham investigation has so far uncovered no evidence of any wrongdoing by Biden or Barack Obama, or that they were even involved with the Russia investigation. There 'was no evidence ... not even remotely ... indicating Obama or Biden did anything wrong,' as one person put it.

The conspiracy theory falsely claims the dossier triggered the Russia investigation and was used as an excuse by the FBI to start it. It also aims to discredit Steele and thus discredit the whole investigation. The real trigger for the July 31 opening of the investigation was two connected events: the July 22 release by WikiLeaks of Democratic National Committee emails stolen by Russian hackers and the July 26 revelation by the Australian government of the bragging by Papadopoulos of Russian offers to aid the Trump campaign by releasing those emails.

The dossier could not have had any role in the opening of the Russia investigation on July 31, 2016, as top FBI officials received the dossier much later on September 19. Instead, it was the activities of George Papadopoulos that started the investigation. The investigation by Inspector General Michael E. Horowitz into Russian interference and alleged FISA abuses found that "none of the evidence used to open the [original Crossfire Hurricane FBI] investigation" came from the C.I.A. or Trump–Russia dossier. On February 4, 2018, Rep. Trey Gowdy (R-S.C.) affirmed that the Russia probe would have happened without the dossier: "So there's going to be a Russia probe, even without a dossier." Also in February 2018, the Nunes memo stated: "The Papadopoulos information triggered the opening of an FBI counterintelligence investigation in late July 2016 by FBI agent Pete Strzok." FBI Deputy Director Andrew McCabe mentioned both the investigation and the FISA warrants:

'We started the investigations without the dossier. We were proceeding with the investigations before we ever received that information,' McCabe told CNN. 'Was the dossier material important to the [FISA] package? Of course, it was. As was every fact included in that package. Was it the majority of what was in the package? Absolutely not.'

Benjamin Wittes has noted how the Durham special counsel investigation was launched because of such conspiracy theory allegations:

It dealt, bizarrely, with the question of whether the FBI was lying about the origins of the Russia investigation. The FBI had claimed—and Special Counsel Robert Mueller had affirmed—that the whole thing started when an Australian diplomat named Alexander Downer provided the U.S. with information that a Trump campaign advisor named George Papadopoulos had volunteered in a London meeting over drinks that the Russians had 'dirt' on Clinton in the form of 'thousands of emails.' But a bunch of Trump supporters ginned up a set of conspiracy theories that this was not how the investigation started, that it all started with Steele, or some secret informant, or that the CIA was involved somehow.

The Durham Report affirmed that "the information [about Papadopoulos] . . . was the sole basis cited by the FBI for opening a full investigation into individuals associated with the ongoing Trump campaign". Durham also confirmed "it was not until mid-September that the Crossfire Hurricane investigators received several of the Steele Reports".

Durham "debunked a prolific Trump lie about the Steele dossier – that it was the reason why the FBI started investigating his campaign in 2016. ... This false claim has been refuted dozens of times over the years, in official Justice Department documentation, bipartisan reports from Congress, and numerous court filings. ... The situation was all the more interesting because Trump has repeatedly acted as a cheerleader for Durham. ... On Tuesday, Durham inadvertently affirmed a basic truth about the Russia probe that Trump has lied about for years.

In April 2018, the Associated Press reported that:

Christopher Steele's raw intelligence reporting did not inform the FBI's decision to initiate its counterintelligence investigation in late July 2016. In fact, the FBI's closely-held investigative team only received Steele's reporting in mid-September - more than seven weeks later. The FBI - and, subsequently, the Special Counsel's - investigation into links between the Russian government and Trump campaign associates has been based on troubling law enforcement and intelligence information unrelated to the 'dossier.'

Heather Digby Parton described why we should "forget the Steele dossier" as a "reason for the Russia investigation":

No doubt there was some histrionic coverage of the Steele Dossier. But the truth is that virtually every news outlet that reported it made clear that it was unsubstantiated and no one reported that it was the only reason for the Russia investigation. Trump and his campaign's suspicious behavior was more than enough to set off alarms all over the world.

=== The FISA application: Nunes memo and Schiff memo ===
The role of evidence from the Steele dossier in seeking FISA warrants has been the subject of debate, as to whether it was a significant portion of the application. In 2017, it was reported that information from the dossier had been used as part of the basis for getting the October 2016 FISA warrant to monitor Page. According to the Horowitz report, in the six weeks prior to its receipt of Steele's memos, the FBI's Crossfire Hurricane team considered FISAs for Page and Papadopoulos, but didn't have enough evidence to proceed.

In February 2018, the Republican House Intelligence Committee chair, Devin Nunes, released a memo which cited FBI Deputy Director Andrew McCabe's testimony to show that the Steele dossier had been a significant portion of the FISA application. McCabe disputed that those were his statements, and stated that they were being mischaracterized.

In 2018, an opposing memo drafted by Democratic Senator Adam Schiff was released with redactions by a House intelligence panel after initially being blocked by Trump. It claimed that the FBI had corroborated part of the Steele dossier, that the FBI had properly applied for its FISA warrant, citing a prior FBI interview about Page's contact with Russian officials, and that the dossier didn't play a major role in the investigation.

Schiff's claims were later rebutted by Inspector General Horowitz's report, which found that the dossier did play a central role. Horowitz also identified errors in the FBI's FISA application, vindicating parts of the Nunes memo. The Horowitz report did not find political bias in the use of the dossier.

=== Other conspiracy theories and false claims ===
The founders of Fusion GPS did not expect their connections to Bruce and Nellie Ohr, Steele, Hillary Clinton, and the FBI to "become public and subsequently provide the framework for a deep-state conspiracy theory".

The dossier also figures as part of the Spygate conspiracy theory and conspiracy theories related to the Trump–Ukraine scandal. According to The Wall Street Journal, President Trump's actions in the Trump–Ukraine scandal stemmed from his belief that Ukraine was responsible for the Steele Dossier. Trump has insinuated that the dossier had its origins in Ukraine, that the Clintons were involved, that Hillary Clinton's email server is currently secreted in Ukraine, and that Clinton's deleted emails are in Ukraine.

The dossier is central to Republican assertions that Trump is the victim of an intelligence community conspiracy to take him down. Democrats see this focus on the dossier as conspiratorial. Congressman Devin Nunes, a staunch Trump defender, asserted as fact that the dossier originated in Ukraine during his questioning of EU ambassador Gordon Sondland during the Trump impeachment inquiry hearings in September 2019. Nunes also accused Hillary Clinton of colluding with Russia to get dirt on Trump. A fact-check by The Washington Post analyzed the claim and the role of the dossier. It found the claim to be false and gave it four Pinocchios.

According to Eric Lutz, Matt Gaetz and Jim Jordan have pushed a conspiracy theory that the dossier was "based on Russian disinformation". The inspector general's report concluded "that more should have been done to examine Steele's contacts with intermediaries of Russian oligarchs in order to assess those contacts as potential sources of disinformation that could have influenced Steele's reporting".

David Frum also described a "suddenly red-hot media campaign to endorse Trump's fantasy that he was the victim of a 'Russia hoax.'" Frum argued that "anti-anti-Trump journalists want to use the Steele controversy to score points off politicians and media institutions that they dislike," and thus they "help him execute one of his Big Lies".

== Denials of specific accusations ==
=== Michael Cohen ===
Cohen's attorney, Lanny Davis, says (at 8:50) Cohen was "never, ever" in Prague.

Dossier source(s) allege that Cohen and three colleagues met Kremlin officials in the Prague offices of Rossotrudnichestvo in August 2016, to arrange for payments to the hackers, cover up the hack, and "cover up ties between Trump and Russia, including Manafort's involvement in Ukraine".

In 2016, Cohen told Mother Jones that he had visited Prague briefly 14 years before. The Wall Street Journal reported Cohen telling them (at an unspecified date) that he had been in Prague in 2001. Following the dossier's publication, as well as after subsequent reports, Cohen repeatedly denied having ever been to Prague. Cohen's attorney Lanny Davis said Cohen was "never, ever" in Prague, and that all allegations mentioning Cohen in the Steele dossier were false.

Cohen's passport showed that he entered Italy in early July 2016, and that he left Italy in mid-July 2016, from Rome, Italy. Buzzfeed News in May 2017 reported Cohen telling them that he was in Capri, Italy, for the time period in question with his family, friends, and musician and actor Steven van Zandt, and that receipts would prove he had been on Capri, but he declined to provide them. Roger Friedman reported sources quoting van Zandt's wife, Maureen, as saying that she and Steven were in Rome, and never traveled to Capri. From this, Nancy LeTourneau of Washington Monthly commented that Cohen may have "lost his alibi", and thus doubted if he had really not traveled to Prague. A December 2018 statement from Steven van Zandt's Twitter said that he had met Cohen in Rome and not traveled together. In March 2019, The Washington Post reported that Cohen had been in Capri and Rome during his Italy trip, and that Cohen said he met Steven van Zandt in Rome.

Cohen has also stated that he was in Los Angeles between August 23 and 29, and in New York for the entire month of September.

=== Aleksej Gubarev ===
Gubarev has denied all accusations made in the dossier. The accusations are twofold, as they mention Gubarev and his companies. While there is evidence that Gubarev's companies may have been used to facilitate cybercrimes, Andrew Weisburd has said that "Neither BuzzFeed nor Steele have accused Gubarev of being a willing participant in wrongdoing."

=== Paul Manafort ===
Manafort has "denied taking part in any collusion with the Russian state, but registered himself as a foreign agent retroactively after it was revealed his firm received more than $17m working as a lobbyist for a pro-Russian Ukrainian party."

=== Carter Page ===
Page originally denied meeting any Russian officials, but his later testimony, acknowledging that he had met with senior Russian officials at Rosneft, has been interpreted as corroboration of portions of the dossier. On February 11, 2021, Page lost a defamation suit he had filed against Yahoo! News and HuffPost for their articles describing his activities mentioned in the Steele dossier. The judge said: "The article simply says that U.S. intelligence agencies were investigating reports of plaintiff's meetings with Russian officials, which Plaintiff admits is true."

=== Donald Trump ===
Trump addressed the "golden showers" allegation in January 2017, stating: "Does anyone really believe that story? I'm also very much of a germaphobe, by the way." This contradicted an interview in 2015 when he stated: "'I'm not germaphobic,' he said, when asked if he would kiss babies and shake hands on the campaign trail."

According to Comey, in several private conversations between him and Trump in early 2017, Trump denied the allegation, stating that he assumed he was always being recorded when in Russia.

== Reactions to dossier ==
November 14, 2017 – House Intelligence Committee transcript of Glenn Simpson

August 22, 2017, Fusion GPS testimony transcript of Glenn Simpson

=== Trump ===
Trump has labeled the dossier "fake news", a "political witch hunt", "debunked", "fictitious", and "discredited". Many mainstream sources have also described the dossier as "discredited".

Donald Trump's first Twitter reaction to the dossier was a January 10, 2017, tweet: "FAKE NEWS—A TOTAL POLITICAL WITCH HUNT!". Trump has repeatedly denied collusion with Russia and criticized the intelligence and media sources that published the dossier. During a press conference on January 11, 2017, Trump denounced the dossier's claims as false, saying it was "disgraceful" for U.S. intelligence agencies to report them. In response to Trump's criticism, CNN said it had published "carefully sourced reporting" on the matter that had been "matched by the other major news organizations".

A footnote in the Mueller Report revealed that Trump requested James Comey and James Clapper to publicly refute the dossier. The two men then exchanged emails about the request, with Clapper saying that "Trump wanted him to say the dossier was 'bogus, which, of course, I can't do'."

On July 11, 2020, Trump tweeted that Steele should be extradited.

=== Mueller Report ===
In July 2019, Special Agent in Charge David Archey briefed the Senate Intelligence Committee about certain aspects of the Special Counsel Office's (SCO) "investigative process and information management":

We [the SCO] were aware of the Steele dossier, obviously. We were aware of some of the efforts that went into its verification. ... we did not include Steele dossier reporting in the report. ... [T]hose allegations go to the heart of things that were in our mandate—but we believed our own investigation. The information that we collected would have superseded it, and been something we would have relied on more, and that's why you see what we did in the report and not the Steele dossier in the report.

"Archey declined to provide further information on whether FBI or SCO attempted to verify information in the dossier, although he noted that the SCO did not draw on the dossier to support its conclusions."

=== Others ===
On January 4, 2018, U.S. District Court Judge Amit P. Mehta ruled on Trump's repeated tweets describing the dossier as "fake" or "discredited":

None of the tweets inescapably lead to the inference that the President's statements about the Dossier are rooted in information he received from the law enforcement and intelligence communities. ... The President's statements may very well be based on media reports or his own personal knowledge, or could simply be viewed as political statements intended to counter media accounts about the Russia investigation, rather than assertions of pure fact.

Adam Goldman and Charlie Savage called it "deeply flawed". Savage described it as generally unreliable. Both have also described it as a "compendium of rumors and unproven assertions". Ryan Lucas described it as an "explosive dossier of unsubstantiated and salacious material about President Trump's alleged ties with Russia".

Russia calls it an "absolute fabrication" and "a hoax intended to further damage U.S.–Russian relations".

As Putin's press secretary, Peskov insisted in an interview that "I can assure you that the allegations in this funny paper, in this so-called report, they are untrue. They are all fake." Putin called the people who leaked the dossier "worse than prostitutes" and referred to the dossier itself as "rubbish". Putin went on to state he believed the dossier was "clearly fake", fabricated as a plot against the legitimacy of President-elect Trump.

Some of Steele's former colleagues expressed support for his character, saying "The idea his work is fake or a cowboy operation is false—completely untrue. Chris is an experienced and highly regarded professional. He's not the sort of person who will simply pass on gossip."

Among journalists, Bob Woodward called the dossier a "garbage document". Chuck Todd of CBS News labeled the report "fake news". Carl Bernstein said "It's not fake news, otherwise senior-most intelligence chiefs would not have done this." Ben Smith, editor of BuzzFeed, wrote: "The dossier is a document ... of obvious central public importance. It's the subject of multiple investigations by intelligence agencies, by Congress. That was clear a year ago. It's a lot clearer now."

Ynet, an Israeli online news site, reported on January 12, 2017, that U.S. intelligence advised Israeli intelligence officers to be cautious about sharing information with the incoming Trump administration, until the possibility of Russian influence over Trump, suggested by Steele's report, has been fully investigated.

On January 2, 2018, Simpson and Fritsch authored an op-ed in The New York Times, requesting that Republicans "release full transcripts of our firm's testimony" and further wrote that, "the Steele dossier was not the trigger for the FBI's investigation into Russian meddling. As we told the Senate Judiciary Committee in August, our sources said the dossier was taken so seriously because it corroborated reports the bureau had received from other sources, including one inside the Trump camp." Ken Dilanian of NBC News said a "source close to Fusion GPS" told him the FBI had not planted anyone in the Trump camp, but rather that Simpson was referring to Papadopoulos.

On January 5, 2018, in the first known Congressional criminal referral resulting from investigations related to the Russian interference in the 2016 U.S. election, Grassley made a referral to the Justice Department suggesting that they investigate possible criminal charges against Steele for allegedly making false statements to the FBI about the distribution of the dossier's claims, specifically possible "inconsistencies" in what Steele told authorities and "possibly lying to FBI officials". Senator Lindsey Graham also signed the letter. Both Grassley and Graham declared that they were not alleging that Steele "had committed any crime. Rather, they had passed on the information for 'further investigation only'." The referral was met with skepticism from legal experts, as well as some of the other Republicans and Democrats on the Judiciary committee, who reportedly had not been consulted.

On January 8, 2018, a spokesman for Grassley said he did not plan to release the transcript of Simpson's August 22, 2017, testimony before the SJC. The next day, ranking committee member Senator Dianne Feinstein unilaterally released the transcript.

On January 10, 2018, Fox News host Sean Hannity appeared to have advance information on the forthcoming release of the Nunes memo and its assertions about the dossier, saying "more shocking information will be coming out in just days that will show systemic FISA abuse". Hannity asserted that this new information would reveal "a totally phony document full of Russian lies and propaganda that was then used by the Obama administration to surveil members of an opposition party and incoming president," adding that this was "the real Russia collusion story" that represented a "precipice of one of the largest abuses of power in U.S. American history. And I'm talking about the literal shredding of the U.S. Constitution."

In April 2018, the White House Correspondents' Association (WHCA) gave The Merriman Smith Memorial Award to CNN reporters Evan Perez, Jim Sciutto, Jake Tapper and Carl Bernstein. In January 2017, they reported that the intelligence community had briefed Obama and Trump of allegations that Russians claimed to have "compromising personal and financial information" on then-President elect Donald Trump.

As late as July 29, 2018, Trump continued to falsely insist the FBI investigation of Russian interference was initiated because of the dossier, and three days later White House press secretary Sarah Sanders repeated the false assertion. Fox News host Shepard Smith said of Trump's assertion: "In the main and in its parts, that statement is patently false."

Alan Huffman, an expert on opposition research, has compared the two forms of opposition research represented by the dossier and WikiLeaks. He didn't believe the dossier's intelligence gathering to be illegitimate, although "a little strange", while he was troubled by the large dump of documents from WikiLeaks that "may have been obtained in an illegal way".

In March 2020, Steele commented publicly on the dossier, stating: "I stand by the integrity of our work, our sources and what we did."

=== Litigation ===
Multiple lawsuits have been filed in connection with the Steele dossier, primarily involving defamation claims by plaintiffs such as Aleksej Gubarev, the three owners of Alfa-Bank (Mikhail Fridman, Petr Aven, and German Khan), Michael Cohen, Devin Nunes, Giorgi Rtskhiladze, Carter Page, and Trump. They have been filed against Christopher Steele, Orbis Business Intelligence, BuzzFeed, Oath, the Democratic National Committee, and others. All of these defamation cases, except one, were dismissed or withdrawn by the plaintiffs.

Carter Page unsuccessfully sought damages in a lawsuit against the United States Department of Justice, the Federal Bureau of Investigation, and several former U.S. government officials, alleging violations of his constitutional rights. Trump also filed unsuccessful lawsuits against Hillary Clinton, Steele, Orbis, and others.

In September 2018, the Virginia-based entity Coolidge Reagan Foundation filed a complaint at the FEC against the Clinton campaign, DNC, Perkins Coie, and Fusion GPS, for having "violated campaign finance law by conspiring with foreign nationals, including current and former members of the Russian government, to manipulate the results of the 2016 election". The complaint contained seven points, mostly about the alleged conspiracy with foreigners, but also about hiding the alleged crimes by misrepresenting the costs as 'legal expenses' to Perkins Coie, and of the latter acting as a middle man for these expenses.

After due investigation, and some conciliation negotiation, in March 2022, the FEC dismissed most of the charges against Steele, Perkins Coie, and Fusion GPS, including all alleged violations of 52 U.S. Code § 30121. However, the FEC did find "probable cause to believe" that the DNC and the Clinton campaign (and their treasurers) had "[misreported] the purpose of certain disbursements". In a settlement, the FEC fined the DNC $105,000 and the Clinton campaign $8,000 for misreporting those fees and expenses as "legal services" and "legal and compliance consulting" rather than "opposition research". The DNC and the Clinton campaign agreed not to contest the fines, but did not admit having broken the rules.

In November 2025, Senator Chuck Grassley released FBI documents indicating the bureau had sought authorization in 2019 to investigate the Clinton campaign and DNC for the misreported payments, but DOJ officials declined to authorize the investigation.

In March 2025, President Trump signed an executive order suspending security clearances for employees of Perkins Coie, citing the firm's role in hiring Fusion GPS to produce the dossier as evidence of "dishonest and dangerous activity". Perkins Coie called the order "patently unlawful" and filed a lawsuit challenging it.

== See also ==
- Assessing Russian Activities and Intentions in Recent US Elections – 2017 US government report
- Cyberwar: How Russian Hackers and Trolls Helped Elect a President – What We Don't, Can't, and Do Know – 2018 book by Kathleen Hall Jamieson
- Cyberwarfare by Russia – Various types of cyberwarfare used by Russia against many nations
- Foreign electoral intervention – Interventions by foreign governments in elections
- Foreign policy of Donald Trump (2015–16)
- The Plot to Hack America – Non-fiction book by Malcolm Nance
- Russia–United States relations
- Russian espionage in the United States – Espionage against the United States of America committed by the Russian Federation
- Russian Roulette: The Inside Story of Putin's War on America and the Election of Donald Trump – 2018 book by Michael Isikoff and David Corn
- Timelines related to Donald Trump and Russian interference in United States elections – All the Trump Russia timelines
- Trump: The Kremlin Candidate?
- Kremlin papers – Alleged Russian plot to support Trump's candidacy
