= Durham special counsel investigation =

Investigation of FBI investigation of Trump-Russia ties

The Durham report, including the opening letter delivered to Attorney General Merrick Garland

The Durham special counsel investigation (aka Report on Matters Related to Intelligence Activities and Investigations Arising Out of the 2016 Presidential Campaigns) began in 2019 when the U.S. Justice Department designated federal prosecutor John Durham to review the origins of an FBI investigation into Russian interference in the 2016 United States elections. Durham was given authority to examine the government's collection of intelligence about interactions between the 2016 presidential campaign of Donald Trump and Russians, and to review government documents and request voluntary witness statements.

In December 2020, Attorney General William Barr announced that he had elevated Durham's status and authority by appointing him as a special counsel, allowing him to continue the investigation after the end of the Trump presidency.

Durham's investigation followed claims by President Trump and his allies that the FBI Russia investigation, code-named Crossfire Hurricane, was improperly predicated and motivated by political bias. Trump characterized the FBI probe as a "hoax" and "witch hunt" initiated by his political enemies. The FBI investigation had examined contacts between Trump associates and Russian officials and led to the Mueller investigation, which resulted in indictments of 34 individuals and guilty pleas from several Trump associates.

In December 2019 Justice Department Inspector General Michael Horowitz released his report on Crossfire Hurricane, finding the FBI had an "authorized purpose" to open the investigation and no "documentary or testimonial evidence that political bias or improper motivation influenced" the decision to do so. The report also identified 17 "significant errors or omissions" in the FBI's applications to the FISA court to monitor former Trump campaign advisor Carter Page. The report concluded those "fundamental" errors showed a failure of the FBI investigators, managers and supervisors, including senior officials. Attorney General Barr and Durham publicly disagreed with portions of Horowitz's findings, with Barr stating the investigation was launched on "the thinnest of suspicions."

In January 2023, The New York Times reported that concerns had been raised about politicization of Durham's investigation, and that Barr and Durham had sought evidence to support claims the Clinton campaign had promoted the Trump-Russia narrative. These concerns were raised when Durham coined an unproven conspiracy theory he dubbed "Clinton plan intelligence". It alleges that Hillary Clinton approved a plan to falsely link Donald Trump to Russian election interference to distract from her email controversy. The theory was promoted by the Trump administration, based on Russian intelligence material and hacked emails described by journalists and investigators as likely Russian disinformation.

After three-and-a-half-years, Durham indicted three men. One was an FBI lawyer who pleaded guilty to altering an email that was included in a June 2017 application for a surveillance warrant on a former Trump campaign aide; he was sentenced to probation. The other two men were tried and acquitted. According to conservative lawyer Andrew C. McCarthy, Durham's prosecution only charged the defendants with lying "about the identity or status of people from whom they were getting information, not about the information itself."

On May 15, 2023, Durham's final 306-page unclassified report was publicly released by Attorney General Merrick Garland. Durham concluded the FBI opened a full investigation based on "raw, unanalyzed, and uncorroborated intelligence" when only a preliminary investigation or assessment was warranted, and that the bureau applied a different standard when evaluating concerns about the Clinton campaign. The report found senior FBI personnel displayed confirmation bias and "a serious lack of analytical rigor toward the information that they received, especially information received from politically affiliated persons and entities." Durham recommended enhanced oversight of politically sensitive investigations.

== Background ==
Crossfire Hurricane was the counterintelligence investigation undertaken by the Federal Bureau of Investigation (FBI) from July 2016 to May 2017 into links between Trump associates and Russian officials.

In April 2019, Attorney General William Barr testified before Congress that he believed "spying did occur" on the Trump campaign and announced he was reviewing the investigation's origins. The following month, Barr appointed U.S. Attorney John Durham to conduct the inquiry.

In December 2019, DOJ Inspector General Michael E. Horowitz released his report finding the FBI had an "authorized purpose" when it opened the investigation and "did not find documentary or testimonial evidence that political bias or improper motivation influenced" the decision. However, the IG identified 17 "significant errors and omissions" in FISA applications to surveil Trump campaign adviser Carter Page and stated he could not obtain satisfactory explanations for why the errors occurred. The same day the report was released, Barr publicly disagreed with the IG's conclusions, stating the FBI had launched an "intrusive investigation" on "the thinnest of suspicions." Durham issued an unusual public statement the same day disagreeing with "some of the report's conclusions as to predication."

Horowitz referred FBI lawyer Kevin Clinesmith for criminal prosecution after finding he had altered a CIA email used in a FISA renewal application. Clinesmith had been removed from the special counsel's investigation in February 2018 after the IG discovered anti-Trump text messages he had sent, including "Viva le Resistance."

== Investigation into origins of FBI's "Crossfire Hurricane" investigation ==
On October 24, 2019, it was reported that what had been a review of the Russia investigation was now a criminal probe into the matter. The Justice Department could now utilize subpoena power for both witness testimony and documents. Durham also had at his disposal the power to convene a grand jury and file criminal charges, if needed. The New York Times reported in January 2023 that Durham and Barr, contrary to their better knowledge, allowed the media and public to infer that it was crimes committed by the intelligence community against Trump that were the object of this investigation. Instead, Italian authorities had given them evidence of alleged financial crimes by Trump himself: "Mr. Barr and Mr. Durham never disclosed that their inquiry expanded in the fall of 2019, based on a tip from Italian officials, to include a criminal investigation into suspicious financial dealings related to Mr. Trump." Durham never charged Trump. In December 2020, Barr revealed to Congress that on October 19 he had secretly appointed Durham to be special counsel, allowing him to continue the investigation of the origins of the FBI probe into Russian interference after the Trump administration ended. The Justice Department said the appointment was kept secret to avoid interfering with the impending 2020 election.

The New York Times reported on November 22, 2019, that the Justice Department inspector general had made a criminal referral to Durham regarding Kevin Clinesmith, an FBI attorney who had altered an email during the process of acquiring a wiretap warrant renewal on Carter Page, and that referral appeared to be at least part of the reason Durham's investigation was elevated to criminal status. On August 14, 2020, Clinesmith pleaded guilty to a felony violation of altering an email used to maintain Foreign Intelligence Surveillance Act (FISA) warrants. He changed an email to falsely add a claim that Page was "not a source" for the CIA, to a statement by the CIA liaison that Page had a prior operational relationship with the CIA from 2008 to 2013. The Page warrants began in October 2016, months after the FBI's Crossfire Hurricane investigation was opened, so Clinesmith's action and indictment were unrelated to the original basis of Durham's investigation into the origins of the FBI investigation.

The day Justice Department inspector general Michael Horowitz released his report on the 2016 FBI Crossfire Hurricane investigation, which found the investigation was properly predicated and debunked a number of conspiracy theories regarding its origins, Durham issued a statement saying, "we do not agree with some of the report's conclusions as to predication and how the FBI case was opened." Many observers inside and outside the Justice Department, including the inspector general, expressed surprise that Durham would issue such a statement, as federal investigators typically do not publicly comment on their ongoing investigations. Barr also released a statement challenging the findings of the report, later asserting on Fox News that the investigation had been opened "without any basis" and that "what happened to [Trump] was one of the greatest travesties in American history." Horowitz testified to the Senate that prior to release of the report he had asked Durham for any information he had that might change the report's findings, but "none of the discussions changed our findings." The Washington Post reported that Durham could not provide evidence of any setup by American intelligence. In particular, neither Durham nor Horowitz found cause to believe an allegation by former Trump campaign advisor George Papadopoulos – whose actions had triggered the opening of Crossfire Hurricane – that he had been set up by Maltese professor Joseph Mifsud, whom Papadopoulos alleged was a Western intelligence operative. Mifsud was an Italian resident, and Barr and Durham asked Italian officials about him during a trip to Italy, but the officials said they had no involvement in the matter. Mifsud has been claimed to be an intelligence agent by various sources. Former FBI Director James Comey has described Mifsud as a "Russian agent".

The New York Times reported in December 2019 that Durham was examining the role of former CIA director John Brennan in assessing Russian interference in 2016, requesting emails, call logs and other documents. Brennan had been a vocal critic of Trump and a target of his accusations of a conspiracy against him. The Times reported Durham was specifically examining Brennan's views of the Steele dossier and what he said about it to the FBI and other intelligence agencies. Brennan and former Director of National Intelligence James Clapper had testified to Congress that the CIA and other intelligence agencies did not rely on the dossier in preparing the January 2017 intelligence community assessment of Russian interference, and allies of Brennan said he disagreed with the FBI view that the dossier should be given significant weight, as the CIA characterized it as "internet rumor". The Times reported in February 2020 that Durham was examining whether intelligence community officials, and specifically Brennan, had concealed or manipulated evidence of Russian interference to achieve a desired result. FBI and NSA officials told Durham that his pursuit of this line of inquiry was due to his misunderstanding of how the intelligence community functions. Durham interviewed Brennan for eight hours on August 21, 2020, after which a Brennan advisor said Durham told Brennan he was not a subject or target of a criminal investigation, but rather a witness to events.

The New York Times reported in September 2020 that Durham had also sought documents and interviews regarding how the FBI handled an investigation into the Clinton Foundation. The FBI had investigated the Foundation and other matters related to Hillary Clinton, but had found no basis for prosecution, nor did John Huber, a U.S. attorney appointed by Trump's first attorney general Jeff Sessions, after a two-year investigation ending in January 2020.

On November 2, 2020, the day before the presidential election, New York magazine reported that:

According to two sources familiar with the probe, there has been no evidence found, after 18 months of investigation, to support Barr's claims that Trump was targeted by politically biased Obama officials to prevent his election. (The probe remains ongoing.) In fact, the sources said, the Durham investigation has so far uncovered no evidence of any wrongdoing by Biden or Barack Obama, or that they were even involved with the Russia investigation.

As Durham was winding down his investigation in January 2023, The New York Times observed:

But after almost four years – far longer than the Russia investigation itself – Mr. Durham's work is coming to an end without uncovering anything like the deep state plot alleged by Mr. Trump and suspected by Mr. Barr. Moreover, a monthslong review by The New York Times found that the main thrust of the Durham inquiry was marked by some of the very same flaws – including a strained justification for opening it and its role in fueling partisan conspiracy theories that would never be charged in court – that Trump allies claim characterized the Russia investigation.

== Conviction of FBI attorney Kevin Clinesmith ==
On October 24, 2019, The New York Times and The Washington Post reported that Durham's inquiry had been elevated to a criminal investigation, raising concerns of politicization of the Justice Department to pursue political enemies of the President. The Times reported on November 22 that the Justice Department inspector general had made a criminal referral to Durham regarding Kevin Clinesmith, an FBI attorney who had been removed from the Mueller probe in February 2018 after anti-Trump text messages were discovered, and who resigned from the FBI in September 2019 following an inspector general interview. Clinesmith was accused of altering an email during the process of renewing a Foreign Intelligence Surveillance Act (FISA) wiretap warrant against former Trump campaign advisor Carter Page.

Clinesmith pleaded guilty in August 2020 to making a false statement after altering a CIA liaison's email by adding the words "not a source". The alteration falsely made it appear that the CIA had said Carter Page was not a "source" for the agency, when in fact the CIA had said that Page had been an "operational contact" from 2008 to 2013.

On January 29, 2021, Clinesmith was sentenced to 12 months federal probation and 400 hours of community service. The judge stated that Clinesmith "likely believed that what he said about Mr. Page was true" and that he had taken "an inappropriate shortcut." He also said the IG inspection did not establish that "political considerations played a role in Clinesmith's actions."

== Acquittal of Michael Sussmann ==
On September 16, 2021, Durham indicted Michael Sussmann, a partner for the law firm Perkins Coie, alleging he falsely told FBI general counsel James Baker during a September 2016 meeting that he was not representing a client for their discussion. Durham alleged Sussmann was actually representing "a U.S. Technology Industry Executive, a U.S. Internet Company and the Hillary Clinton Presidential Campaign." Sussmann focuses on privacy and cybersecurity law and had approached Baker to discuss what he and others believed to be suspicious communications between computer servers at the Russian Alfa-Bank and the Trump Organization. Sussmann had represented the Democratic National Committee regarding the Russian hacking of its computer network. Sussmann's attorneys have denied he was representing the Clinton campaign. Perkins Coie represented the Clinton presidential campaign, and one of its partners, Marc Elias, commissioned Fusion GPS to conduct opposition research on Trump, which led to the production of the Steele dossier. Sussmann, a former federal prosecutor, characterized the allegations against him as politically motivated and pleaded not guilty the day after his indictment. As with the charge against Clinesmith, the charge against Sussmann was unrelated to the FBI investigation into the myriad improper links between Trump associates and Russian officials, which began in July 2016. Rather than asserting the FBI engaged in wrongdoing, as long alleged by Trump and resulting in Durham's investigation, the Sussmann indictment portrays the bureau as a victim of wrongdoing.

During a 2018 congressional deposition, Baker stated, "I don't remember [Sussmann] specifically saying that he was acting on behalf of a particular client," though the Durham investigation found handwritten notes taken by assistant director of the FBI Counterintelligence Division Bill Priestap which paraphrase Baker telling him after the meeting that Sussmann "said not doing this for any client." The notes also say "Represents DNC, Clinton Foundation, etc.," though they did not say Sussmann told Baker this during the meeting; Baker had also said during his deposition that he was generally familiar with Sussmann's work, as they were friends. The Priestap notes constitute hearsay and it was not clear if they would be admissible in court as evidence under the hearsay rule.

The New York Times reported Durham had records showing Sussmann had billed the Clinton campaign for certain hours he spent working on the Alfa-Bank matter. His attorneys said he did so because he needed to demonstrate internally that he was engaged in billable work, though the work involved consulting with Elias, and the campaign paid a flat monthly fee to Perkins Coie but was not actually charged for those billed hours.

In a December 2021 court filing, Sussmann's attorneys presented portions of two documents provided to them by Durham days earlier which they asserted undermined the indictment. One document was a summary of an interview Durham's investigators conducted with Baker in June 2020 in which he did not say that Sussmann told him he was not there on behalf of any client, but rather that Baker had assumed it and that the issue never came up. A second document was a June 2019 Justice Department inspector general interview with Baker in which he said the Sussmann meeting "related to strange interactions that some number of people that were his clients, who were, he described as I recall it, sort of cybersecurity experts, had found." The New York Times reported that the narrow charge against Sussmann was contained in a 27-page indictment that elaborated on activities of cybersecurity researchers who were not charged, including what their attorneys asserted were selected email excerpts that falsely portrayed them as not actually believing their claims. Trump and his supporters seized on that information to assert the Alfa-Bank matter was a hoax devised by Clinton supporters and so the Trump-Russia investigation had been unjustified. Sussmann's attorneys told the court that the new evidence "underscores the baseless and unprecedented nature of this indictment" and asked that his trial date be moved from July to May 2022. A Durham prosecutor later asserted that subsequent to his 2019 and 2020 interviews, Baker "affirmed and then re-affirmed his now-clear recollection of the defendant's false statement" after refreshing his memory with contemporaneous or near-contemporaneous notes.

In a February 2022 court motion related to Sussmann's prosecution, Durham alleged that Sussmann associate Rodney Joffe and his associates had "exploited" capabilities his company had through a pending cybersecurity contract with the Executive Office of the President (EOP) to acquire nonpublic government Domain Name System (DNS) and other data traffic "for the purpose of gathering derogatory information about Donald Trump." Joffe was not charged and his attorney did not immediately comment. After Sussmann's September 2021 indictment, The New York Times reported that in addition to analyzing suspicious communications involving a Trump server, Sussmann and analysts he worked with became aware of data from a YotaPhone – a Russian-made smartphone rarely used in the United States – that had accessed networks serving the White House, Trump Tower and a Michigan hospital company, Spectrum Health. Like the Alfa-Bank server, a Spectrum Health server also communicated with the Trump Organization server. Sussmann notified CIA counterintelligence of the findings in February 2017, but it was not known if they were investigated. Durham alleged in his February 2022 court motion that Sussmann had claimed his information "demonstrated that Trump and/or his associates were using supposedly rare, Russian-made wireless phones in the vicinity of the White House and other locations," but Durham said he found no evidence to support that. Sussmann's attorneys responded that Durham knew Sussmann had not made such a claim to the CIA. Durham alleged Sussmann's data showed a Russian phone provider connection involving the EOP "during the Obama administration and years before Trump took office." Attorneys for an analyst who examined the YotaPhone data said researchers were investigating malware in the White House; a spokesman for Joffe said his client had lawful access under a contract to analyze White House DNS data for potential security threats. The spokesman asserted Joffe's work was in response to hacks of the EOP in 2015 and of the DNC in 2016, as well as YotaPhone queries in proximity to the EOP and the Trump campaign, that raised "serious and legitimate national security concerns about Russian attempts to infiltrate the 2016 election" that was shared with the CIA. Durham asserted that Sussmann bringing his information to the CIA was part of a broader effort to raise the intelligence community's suspicions of Trump's connections to Russia shortly after he took office. Durham did not allege that any eavesdropping of Trump communications content occurred, nor did he assert the Clinton campaign was involved or that the alleged DNS monitoring activity was unlawful or occurred after Trump took office.

Durham's filing triggered a furor among right-wing media outlets, including misinformation about what Durham had alleged, which was challenged by other outlets and lawyers for the involved parties. Fox News falsely reported that Durham claimed Hillary Clinton's campaign had paid a technology company to "infiltrate" White House and Trump Tower servers; that narrative actually came from Trump ally Kash Patel. The Washington Examiner claimed that this all meant there had been spying on Trump's White House office. Charlie Savage of The New York Times disputed these claims and explained that "Mr. Durham's filing never used the word 'infiltrate.' And it never claimed that Mr. Joffe's company was being paid by the Clinton campaign." Sussmann's attorneys asserted Durham's motion contained falsehoods "intended to further politicize this case, inflame media coverage, and taint the jury pool" as part of a pattern of Durham's behavior since Sussmann's indictment. Durham objected to a motion by Sussmann's attorneys to have the "factual background" section struck from Durham's motion, stating that "If third parties or members of the media have overstated, understated, or otherwise misinterpreted facts contained in the Government's Motion, that does not in any way undermine the valid reasons for the Government's inclusion of this information."

Hillary Clinton responded to the right-wing media attacks by hinting at defamation: "It's funny the more trouble Trump gets into the wilder the charges and conspiracy theories about me seem to get. Fox leads the charge with accusations against me, counting on their audience to fall for it again. As an aside, they're getting awfully close to actual malice in their attacks."

Sussmann's attorneys also explained, "Although the Special Counsel implies that in Mr. Sussmann's February 9, 2017 meeting, he provided Agency-2 with (Executive Office of the President) data from after Mr. Trump took office, the Special Counsel is well aware that the data provided to Agency-2 pertained only to the period of time before Mr. Trump took office, when Barack Obama was President," a time period (2015 and 2016) where much investigation of Russian hacks of Democratic Party and White House networks had occurred: "...cybersecurity researchers were 'deeply concerned' to find data suggesting Russian-made YotaPhones were in proximity to the Trump campaign and the White House, so 'prepared a report of their findings, which was subsequently shared with the C.I.A.'"

During a March 2022 court hearing, presiding judge Casey Cooper remarked that Durham's February motion relating to Joffe created a "dustup" that "strikes me as a sideshow in many respects," adding "I don't know why the information is in there." He said the motion, which was ostensibly about a potential conflict of interest matter, could have been quickly resolved in a brief hearing. Cooper then asked Sussmann if he would waive the conflict of interest issue, which Sussmann did, leading Cooper to say, "I didn't need any of that ancillary information to do that." Cooper declined to strike the ancillary information as Sussmann's attorneys had requested, saying he would not ascribe any motives to Durham's motion.

In an April 2022 flurry of late-night court filings by the prosecution and defense prior to the trial beginning the next month, Durham presented a text message Sussmann sent to Baker the night before their meeting which read, "I'm coming on my own – not on behalf of a client or company – want to help the bureau," which appeared to support Durham's allegation that Sussmann had lied to investigators. The New York Times reported that Durham's filings suggested he might introduce at trial the Steele dossier in an effort to suggest a broader conspiracy between Sussmann and the Clinton campaign. Durham's indictment did not mention the dossier, and Sussmann's attorneys argued Durham "should not be permitted to turn Mr. Sussmann's trial on a narrow false statement charge into a circus full of sideshows that will only fuel partisan fervor." Durham argued that Sussmann's team should not be allowed at trial to suggest any political motivation behind the prosecution. Sussmann's attorneys asked judge Cooper to dismiss the case if Joffe were not granted immunity to provide "critical exculpatory testimony" for Sussmann.

Nine days before the trial, Cooper ruled Durham could not present an argument to the jury that Sussmann was part of a broad "joint venture" involving the Clinton campaign, Fusion GPS, Democratic operatives and various technology researchers. Cooper said allowing such an argument would amount to a "time-consuming and largely unnecessary mini-trial," considering Sussmann had been narrowly charged with lying to investigators rather than conspiracy. Cooper ruled prosecutors could question witnesses about the scope of the DNS analysis, but would not be allowed to introduce evidence that Joffe allegedly had doubts about the accuracy of some of the data. The judge said he was unlikely to allow evidence Joffe may have breached the terms of his employer's government contract, saying it was "at best, only marginally probative of [Sussmann's] supposed motive to lie to the FBI." Cooper did not grant Joffe immunity for his testimony, but said the limits he placed on Durham's lines of questioning might ease his concerns that Joffe could incriminate himself if he were to testify.

Sussmann was acquitted on May 31, 2022. The New York Times reported in January 2023 that two prosecutors on Durham's team had argued to him that the evidence against Sussmann was too thin to pursue charges, and that an acquittal would undermine public faith in Durham's investigation and law enforcement. After Durham pursued the prosecution, one of the prosecutors resigned in protest while another left for another job. Durham's prosecution allowed him to make public large amounts of information insinuating involvement of the Hillary Clinton campaign that were not related to Sussman's prosecution on narrow charges. After the Sussmann prosecution failed, Barr stated it "accomplished something far more important" because it "crystallized the central role played by the Hillary campaign in launching as a dirty trick the whole Russiagate collusion narrative and fanning the flames of it."

== Alfa-Bank investigation ==
CNN reported later in September 2021 that the Durham grand jury had subpoenaed documents from Perkins Coie. CNN had viewed emails between Sussmann and others who were researching the server communications, including Joffe, showing that Durham's indictment of Sussmann cited only portions of the emails. The indictment included an unidentified researcher stating in an email, "The only thing that drive[s] us at this point is that we just do not like [Trump]." CNN's review of other emails indicated the researchers later broadened the scope of their examination for presentation to the FBI. Joffe's attorney asserted the indictment contained cherry-picked information to misrepresent what had transpired. Defense lawyers for the scientists who researched the internet traffic between the Trump Organization and Alfa-Bank said that Durham's indictment is misleading and that their clients stand by their findings.

The FBI investigated the purported link and found no improper cyber connection between the Trump Organization and Alfa-Bank; both companies denied any secret communications channel. Sussmann was acquitted by a federal jury in May 2022 after a trial in which his defense argued he had no reason to doubt the data provided by Joffe and his researchers. Joffe was never charged.

== Acquittal of Igor Danchenko ==
In December 2020, Special Counsel John Durham subpoenaed the Brookings Institution for the personnel files of Washington-based Russian analyst Igor Danchenko. In November 2021, Danchenko was arrested in connection with the John Durham investigation and was charged with five counts of making false statements to the FBI on five different occasions (between March 2017 and November 2017) regarding the sources of material he provided for the Steele dossier. This includes Danchenko having allegedly obscured his relationship with Charles Dolan Jr. and having allegedly fabricated contacts with Sergei Millian. Danchenko pleaded not guilty and was released on bail.

Trump's supporters reacted strongly to these reports of Danchenko's arrest, but conservative columnist and attorney Andrew C. McCarthy described their reactions as "if not irrational, then exaggerated". He provided context when he urged them to be cautious, as Durham's indictments "narrowly allege that the defendants lied to the FBI only about the identity or status of people from whom they were getting information, not about the information itself."

Danchenko's trial began on October 11, 2022. In an order at the beginning of October 2022, the court "excluded from the trial large amounts of information that Mr. Durham had wanted to showcase" as not being evidence for the charges of making false statements. Danchenko was tried on four counts of lying to the FBI about one of his sources and, on October 18, acquitted by the jury on all four. The week before, U.S. District Judge Anthony Trenga acquitted Danchenko of a fifth count, stating that "[t]he prosecution had failed to produce sufficient evidence for that charge to even go to the jury."

Following the trial, the jury deliberated for one day before acquitting Danchenko of the four remaining charges on October 18, 2022. The case represented the second indictment in Durham's probe to go to trial and the second not-guilty verdict.

Durham said Danchenko lied, but the FBI valued him. During the trial, two FBI officials revealed that Danchenko was "an uncommonly valuable" confidential human source for several years whose role went far beyond the Steele dossier:

Helson testified that Danchenko's reports as a confidential informant were used by the FBI in 25 investigations and 40 intelligence reports during a nearly four-year period from March 2017 to October 2020.... Danchenko, the FBI agent said, was considered 'a model' informant and 'reshaped the way the U.S. even perceives threats.' Helson said that none of his previous informants had ever had as many sub-sources as Danchenko and that others at the FBI have continued to ask in recent months for Danchenko's assistance amid Russia's invasion of Ukraine.

== Aftermath ==
In January 2023, as Durham was winding down the investigation and drafting a final report, The New York Times published an exposé containing several revelations regarding the investigation. The Times reported that Durham and Nora Dannehy, a longtime Durham aide and his deputy for the investigation, had a series of disputes over Durham's and Barr's prosecutorial ethics. Dannehy unexpectedly resigned from the Justice Department in September 2020 without a public explanation. The Times reported that Dannehy pressed Durham to ask Barr to adhere to DOJ policy by not publicly discussing the ongoing investigation; as one example, in April 2020 Barr said on Fox News that "the evidence shows that we are not dealing with just mistakes or sloppiness. There is something far more troubling here." Durham declined her request. Months before the 2020 presidential election, Barr asked Durham to prepare an interim report relating to the Clinton campaign and FBI gullibility or willful blindness. After Dannehy learned that other Durham prosecutors had drafted such a report, which she said contained disputed information and should not be released just before an election, she erupted, sent colleagues a memo explaining her concerns, and resigned.

About two weeks after Dannehy left, someone leaked to Fox Business host Maria Bartiromo that no interim report would be released prior to the election. The director of national intelligence, John Ratcliffe, then sought to inject similar information into the campaign by declassifying nearly 1,000 pages of documents for the Durham investigation to use, over the objection of CIA director Gina Haspel. Ratcliffe also wrote to senator Lindsey Graham that the "Russian intelligence analysis" stolen by Dutch intelligence said Clinton had approved a plan to link Trump to Russia. The Times reported that Dutch intelligence was infuriated by release of the information that they had provided with the strictest confidence.

Durham used the intelligence memos that Dutch intelligence had stolen from its Russian counterpart, which some American officials believed to have been seeded with misinformation. The memos contained descriptions of purported conversations among Americans discussing how Hillary Clinton might attempt to frame Trump by linking him to Russian hacking. One such individual was Leonard Benardo, executive vice president of the Open Society Foundations, which was founded by George Soros. The Russian memos claimed that Benardo and Democratic congresswoman Debbie Wasserman Schultz had discussed how then-attorney general Loretta Lynch had purportedly promised to keep the Hillary Clinton email investigation from going too far. Benardo and Schultz denied knowing each other. Durham twice asked federal judge Beryl Howell for an order to seize information about Benardo's emails; Howell denied the request twice, citing the weakness of the Russian memos. Durham then used his grand jury power to demand documents and testimony from the Foundation and from Benardo about his emails. They complied with the demands rather than fight them in court, though the Times reported that line of inquiry appeared to have been a dead end. Durham's final report refers sixty-five times to the "Clinton Plan intelligence" but acknowledges the Russian documents might be fabricated.

The Times reported that by the time he took office, Barr suspected intelligence agencies had played a role in instigating the Crossfire Hurricane investigation. Soon after appointing Durham, Barr summoned to his office National Security Agency director Paul Nakasone to demand his agency cooperate with Durham. He said he believed the NSA's "friends" in the CIA and British intelligence had worked to target the Trump campaign. Durham's team spent its first months looking into this allegation, including by examining CIA files, but found no evidence to support it. Barr and Durham traveled to Britain and Italy to determine if their intelligence agencies had found anything about the Trump campaign and relayed it to the United States, but both countries denied doing so. Top British intelligence officials expressed indignation at the allegation to their American counterparts. Italian officials did, however, tell Barr and Durham that they had evidence linking Trump to certain suspected financial crimes, which the men considered serious enough to open a criminal investigation. But rather than bring in another prosecutor, Barr assigned the matter to Durham, even though the tip's substance was outside the scope of Durham's inquiry: the Russia investigation. No charges related to this matter were ever filed and it remains unknown how any investigation may have proceeded. In October 2019, multiple press outlets reported Durham had elevated his investigation to criminal status, which the press erroneously assumed was related to the Russia investigation. Barr regularly spoke publicly about the Durham investigation to advance a pro-Trump narrative, but he did not say anything to dispel the erroneous assumption.

Following the Times exposé, senator Dick Durbin, chair of the Senate Judiciary Committee, said his committee would "do its part and take a hard look ... to ensure such abuses of power cannot happen again." Democratic congressmen Ted Lieu and Dan Goldman asked the DOJ inspector general to investigate whether Barr and Durham "violated any laws, DOJ rules or practices, or canons of legal ethics."

== Final report ==
On May 12, 2023, Durham submitted to Attorney General Merrick Garland a 306-page unclassified report for public release and a 29-page classified appendix. The report was publicly released on May 15, without substantive comment or redactions by Garland.

The report largely repeated information that had been previously known, with no new significant revelations of FBI misconduct in its Crossfire Hurricane investigation. Durham alleged the FBI opened the investigation based on "raw, unanalyzed, and uncorroborated intelligence," a wording which The New York Times identified as an apparent allusion to the Steele dossier, even though it did not trigger the investigation, as many have long alleged; elsewhere in the report Durham acknowledged the investigators did not have the dossier until weeks after the investigation was opened. Durham said that the failure of the FBI "to critically analyze information that ran counter to the narrative of a Trump/Russia collusive relationship throughout Crossfire Hurricane is extremely troublesome" and caused "severe reputational harm" to the bureau. He largely addressed weaknesses in FBI procedures previously reported by the DOJ inspector general in 2019, notably botched wiretap applications for former Trump campaign aide Carter Page. As he did during his failed Michael Sussmann prosecution, Durham continued to insinuate the Hillary Clinton campaign had helped to trigger an FBI investigation of Trump. The final report did not find what Trump alleged to be a "deep state" plot against him.

Durham said the FBI was justified in opening a "preliminary assessment or at most a preliminary investigation" but stated they "should not have gone as far as opening a full probe into whether individuals associated with the Trump campaign were coordinating with the Russian government". He had previously criticized the 2019 inspector general's finding that a full investigation had been justified and that there was no "documentary or testimonial evidence of intentional misconduct." Durham did not find that any FBI rule had been violated by opening a full investigation.

Durham's report stated that the DOJ and FBI "failed to uphold their important mission of strict fidelity to the law," though the report did not "recommend any wholesale changes in the guidelines and policies that the Department and FBI now have in place to ensure proper conduct and accountability in how counterintelligence activities are carried out." Prominent national security attorney Brad Moss characterized Durham's conclusions as "a 'be more careful next time' report."

Durham said the FBI was more deferential to Clinton than to Trump by opening a preliminary, rather than a full, investigation into Clinton. This 2016 preliminary investigation was opened based on information from the book Clinton Cash, written by Peter Schweizer, a senior editor of the far-right media organization Breitbart News. The book made allegations that foreign powers were attempting to buy influence with Clinton. The FBI gave her a "defensive briefing" to alert her of such threats. Durham said the Trump full investigation was opened on the basis of "unvetted hearsay," which was in the form of an alert from Alexander Downer, a high-ranking Australian diplomat. Durham wrote Trump had not been given a defensive briefing before Crossfire Hurricane was opened, though he was briefed in late-July or August 2016, soon after winning the Republican nomination. By September 2020, Durham had broadened the scope of his investigation to include an examination of how the FBI investigated matters involving Clinton, such as the Clinton Foundation, the Uranium One controversy and her email controversy. In January 2020 a US attorney appointed by attorney general Jeff Sessions, at the urging of Trump and congressional Republicans, quietly concluded a two-year examination of the matters, having found nothing warranting further investigation.

Like the inspector general, Durham did not conclude there was political motivation involved, but found there was confirmation bias and a "lack of analytical rigor". He said he found no evidence the FBI considered any role the Clinton campaign might have played in influencing the investigation, even citing messages Peter Strzok sent to colleagues urging skepticism of the Steele dossier; Strzok messaged that whoever commissioned it was "presumed to be connected to the campaign in some way".

The report did not mention the unfruitful Barr and Durham trips to Italy and Britain seeking evidence of foreign meddling in the investigation. The men had traveled there in 2019 seeking evidence those countries' intelligence services may have relayed information about Trump to their American counterparts, which might have instigated Crossfire Hurricane. Both countries denied involvement. The New York Times reported that Italian officials did, however, provide additional information implicating Trump by telling the men they had evidence linking Trump to certain suspected financial crimes. The men found the evidence credible enough for Barr to instruct Durham to open a criminal investigation, though his public report did not disclose any of this. The special counsel regulation requires disclosure to the attorney general of any investigation undertaken by a special counsel.

The Washington Post wrote that Durham recommended the FBI create a nonpartisan "position for an FBI agent or lawyer to provide oversight of politically sensitive investigations. That person would be tasked with challenging every step of such investigations, including whether officials appropriately adhered to the rules governing applications to the Foreign Intelligence Surveillance Court, which handles matters of national security."

Both Durham and the Inspector General report on FBI and DOJ actions in the 2016 election "did not find any evidence of widespread spying on the Trump election campaign".

The investigation cost more than $6.5 million. In his transmittal letter to the attorney general, Durham thanked Garland for "permitting our inquiry to proceed independently".

== Clinton plan intelligence conspiracy theory ==
Durham's investigation examined intelligence the CIA received in late July 2016 from a Dutch intelligence agency, which purported to show that Hillary Clinton had allegedly approved a plan to falsely tie Trump to Russia as a way of distracting from the controversy over her use of a private email server.

Durham dubbed the alleged plan "Clinton plan intelligence". It refers to an unproven conspiracy theory described as Russian intelligence disinformation and promoted by the Trump administration. The term was coined by Durham to describe an allegation that Hillary Clinton, her 2016 presidential campaign, and senior Obama administration officials conspired to fabricate a supposed "Russiagate hoax" by falsely asserting Donald Trump had improper ties to Russian election interference, purportedly to "stir up a scandal" and distract from Clinton's email controversy. Clinton's routine campaign activities and public concern about the Russian hacking of Democratic targets, along with Trump's favorable statements about Russia and Vladimir Putin, were later reframed by Durham and Republicans as evidence of a "vast conspiracy" to "fabricate a scandal ... [as] part of a dastardly 'Plan' to tarnish" and frame Trump.

The theory relies on hacked emails later assessed as a likely manipulated Russian production. The emails were mentioned in Russian memos obtained in 2016 by Dutch intelligence after it hacked into Russian intelligence systems, and Durham's source material included Russian spies discussing plans to create such material. This information was shared with U.S. intelligence, which viewed the material "with caution" due to the "possibility the Russians had exaggerated things for their own purposes, or knew the server was compromised and deliberately mixed in disinformation". Some coverage remained in a classified annex to the Durham report, released publicly two years later and described as containing unverified or dubious intelligence.

In his 2023 final report, Durham unsuccessfully tried to prove the alleged "plan" existed. The New York Times wrote that Durham's descriptions of the hacked emails' dubious nature sounded like he was "debunking" them, that he had buried information favorable to Clinton, and that the emails were "almost certainly a product of Russian disinformation".

On July 31, 2025, during Trump's second administration, the annex was declassified and released in an effort to revive and promote the "Clinton plan" theory. The release publicly amplified dubious hacked Russian material, using it to relitigate and challenge prior findings on Russian interference in the 2016 election and its aftermath, actions described as an attempt to rewrite the history of the 2016 election and the findings of both Mueller's Trump-Russia probe and the FBI's Crossfire Hurricane investigation.

== Reactions ==
In December 2019, following Durham's unusual public statement disagreeing with Inspector General Horowitz's conclusions, former FBI Director James Comey criticized Durham, warning: "Don't be a part of the sliming of the IG and the department as a whole. Do your work."

Trump and his supporters in conservative media and congress characterized the final report as explosive and groundbreaking, a "bombshell" that exposed a "treasonous charade." Mainstream media outlets concluded the opposite. Trump inaccurately posted on Truth Social that Durham had concluded "the FBI should never have launched the Trump-Russia Probe!" and sent fundraising emails declaring "I WAS FRAMED." Other conservative figures accused Hillary Clinton, President Biden, former president Barack Obama and a cast of other Democrats of conducting what Breitbart called the "collusion hoax."

Law professor Jonathan Turley and Republican senator Marsha Blackburn asserted the Russian collusion theory was a hoax invented by Clinton and her operatives. Although Durham insinuated Clinton involvement that fueled speculation in conservative media, he did not find evidence to bring charges against her. The Wall Street Journal editorial board characterized the Russia collusion narrative as a "fabrication" and called it "a travesty that shouldn't be forgotten," criticizing the FBI for displaying "double standards" between its treatment of the Trump and Clinton campaigns.

Aitan Goelman, an attorney for Peter Strzok who was a key FBI figure in the Crossfire Hurricane investigation, accused Durham of leading a dysfunctional investigation, saying, "In fact, it is Mr. Durham's investigation that was politically motivated, a direct consequence of former President Trump's weaponization of the Department of Justice, an effort that unanimous juries in each of Mr. Durham's trials soundly rejected."

Frank Figliuzzi, a former assistant director of the FBI Counterintelligence Division, said:

"Really, the most malignant interpretation of this report is Durham was tasked with doing something that was not only unnecessary to do because the [inspector general] had already done it, but tasked with doing whatever he could to destroy the origins of the Crossfire Hurricane original case ... If the goal was to wrack [sic] up many indictments and prove all of this "Russia, Russia, Russia" stuff, as Trump says, wrong, he's failed miserably. But if the goal, at least the consolation prize, was to hand over a politically tainted document that can be used in sound bites over and over again on Fox News and other platforms, already congressman Jim Jordan has publicly stated he's going to call Durham to testify in congress and I'll note as others have done, John Durham should be Exhibit A in the so-called "Weaponization of Government Subcommittee" because he was weaponized by Bill Barr and turned against the very institutions that he comes out of."

Former federal prosecutor Shan Wu criticized Durham and demanded an apology from him:

I find Durham's investigation to be a complete waste of taxpayer dollars... Durham failed to produce any evidence of what Trump promised to be 'the crime of the century'—presumably involving the 'deep-state conspiracy' mantra of Trump supporters—and sent no one to jail.... [The report] reads like a plagiarized version of the 2019 [Inspector General's report]... Durham also lacks any moral authority to lecture the FBI or anyone else about concerns over political bias when his entire investigation originated with Barr's efforts to politically weaponize the DOJ. Durham's investigation was so compromised that his own top aide, a respected career prosecutor, resigned in protest.

CNN anchor Jake Tapper said the report "is regardless devastating to the FBI and, to a degree, it does exonerate Donald Trump," while noting that "the bombshell indictments did not happen."

== See also ==
- Biden–Ukraine conspiracy theory
- Russia investigation origins conspiracy theory
