= Mike Sussman =

Mike Sussman may refer to:

- Mike Sussman (TV series writer/producer) (born 1975), best known for his work on the shows Star Trek: Voyager, Star Trek: Enterprise and Perception
- Mike Sussman (TV promotions writer/producer), television promotions writer and producer, best known for his promotional spots for The Andy Griffith Show
- Michael Sussmann, (born 1964) is an American former federal prosecutor and a former partner at the law firm Perkins Coie, who focused on privacy and cybersecurity law
