= Clinton plan intelligence conspiracy theory =

Right-wing conspiracy theory

"Clinton plan intelligence" is an unproven conspiracy theory (Note: Many descriptive terms have been used for the alleged "plan" and its circumstances: conspiracy; conspiracy theory; disinformation (Note: Many sources have described the alleged "plan" as Russian disinformation used to help Trump.); fabricated; grand conspiracy; plot; scheme; theory; vast conspiracy) promoted as if true by the Trump administration. It is based on Russian intelligence material and hacked and manipulated emails described by journalists and investigators as likely Russian disinformation. It alleges that Hillary Clinton approved a plan to "falsely" link Donald Trump to Russian election interference. The phrase's wording, with his addition of "falsely", was coined by special counsel John Durham to describe allegations that Hillary Clinton, her 2016 presidential campaign, and senior Obama administration officials developed the purported plan to distract from Clinton's email controversy.

The purported emails were referenced in Russian memoranda obtained in 2016 by Dutch intelligence after it hacked into Russian intelligence systems. The material was shared with the U.S. Intelligence Community, which treated it with caution, citing the possibility that it had been exaggerated or deliberately mixed with disinformation. The material was kept in a classified annex to the Durham report, which was not publicly released until two years after the main report.

In his 2023 final report, Durham investigated the alleged plan, acknowledging uncertainty about its accuracy and finding no evidence that Clinton or government officials coordinated a scheme to fabricate evidence against Trump. The New York Times characterized portions of Durham's analysis as a "debunking" of the central allegation, noting that his discussion of the emails described them as likely composites derived from unrelated hacked material.

On September 29, 2020, near the end of Trump's first presidency, the annex was declassified and released "mere hours before the first Trump-Biden debate", a timing that was criticized and described as part of renewed efforts by Trump administration officials and allies to relitigate and challenge existing investigative findings regarding Russian interference in the 2016 election. Commentators described these efforts as attempts to rewrite the history of the 2016 election and to challenge the findings of both Mueller's Trump-Russia investigation and the FBI's Crossfire Hurricane investigation.

== The theory ==
=== Definition and scope ===
The "Clinton plan" theory has been described as a right-wing conspiracy theory advanced by Trump and his associates. The theory accuses Hillary Clinton and senior officials in the Obama administration of engaging in a conspiratorial plan, plot, or scheme to fabricate an alleged "Russia collusion hoax" by "falsely" asserting that Donald Trump had improper ties to Russia and its interference in the 2016 United States elections. The New York Times described the allegation as "a way to blame Mrs. Clinton for the fact that Mr. Trump's campaign came under suspicions that prompted the Russia investigation eventually led by Robert S. Mueller III, the special counsel".

The Durham report cites then–director of national intelligence John Ratcliffe's original description of the alleged "Clinton plan", a wording that only mentions Putin and the hacking of the DNC, not other Russia-related objects of the alleged plan. It also includes the intelligence community's (IC) skeptical view of the allegation:

In late July 2016, U.S. intelligence agencies obtained insight into Russian intelligence analysis alleging that U.S. Presidential candidate Hillary Clinton had approved a campaign plan to stir up a scandal against U.S. Presidential candidate Donald Trump by tying him to Putin and the Russians' hacking of the Democratic National Committee. The IC does not know the accuracy of this allegation or the extent to which the Russian intelligence analysis may reflect exaggeration or fabrication.

The theory stems from hacked and translated Russian intelligence memos and an accompanying Russian analysis based on portions of hacked American emails from July 2016, rather than on the full original messages. The memos asserted that on July 26, 2016, Hillary Clinton approved a "plan" in the form of "a proposal from one of her foreign policy advisers to vilify Donald Trump by stirring up a scandal claiming interference by the Russian security service".

Russian intelligence memos used the words "Clinton" and "plan" separately rather than as a single phrase or fixed label. In his 2023 final report, Durham combined those elements into a label, writing, "We refer to that intelligence hereafter as the 'Clinton Plan Intelligence'." Elsewhere in the report, he referred to it as the "Clinton plan".

=== Framing and characterizations ===
==== Durham's formulation of the "Clinton Plan Intelligence" ====
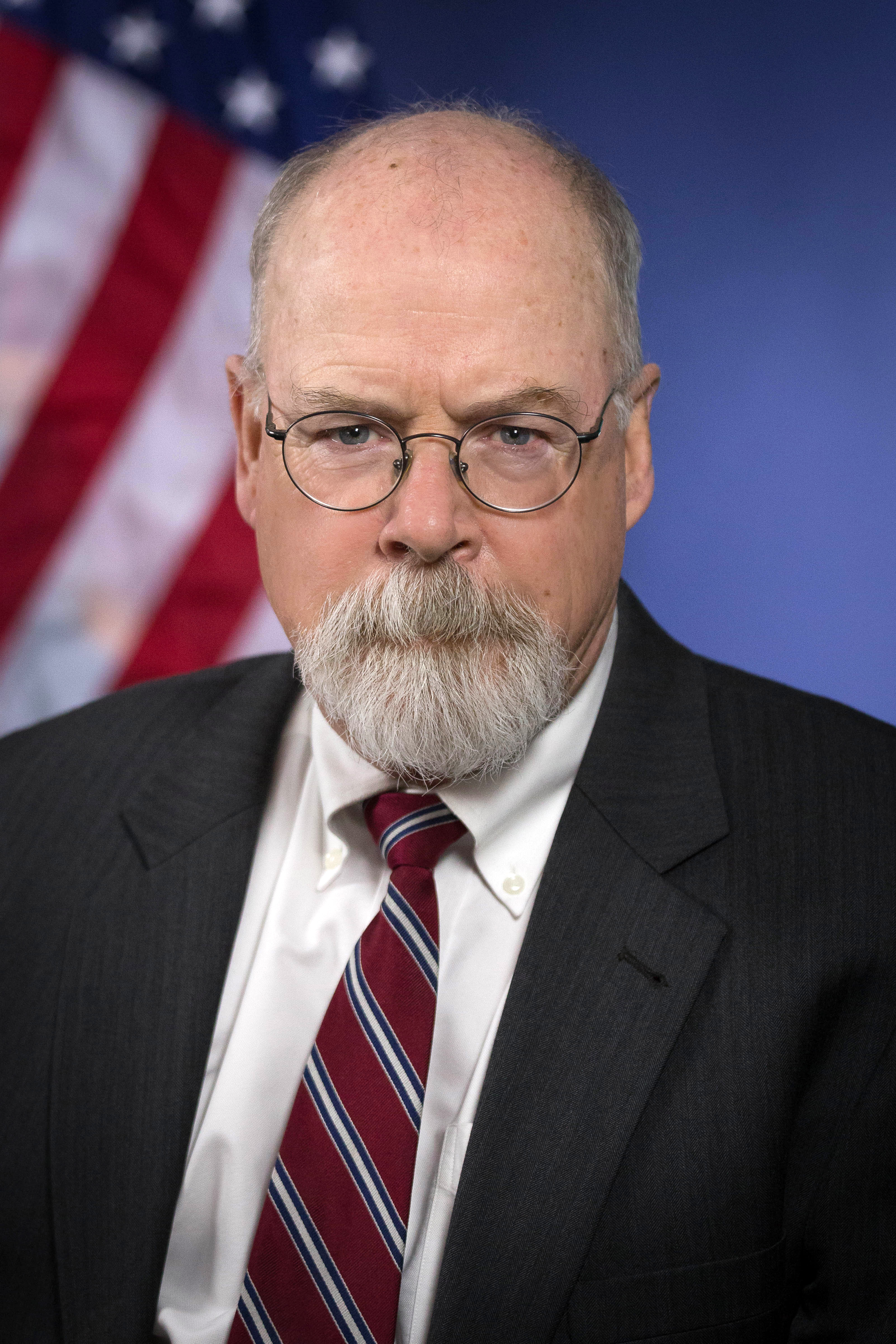
John Durham (2018)

In his 2023 final report, Durham created a label for the alleged Clinton plan: "We refer to that intelligence hereafter as the 'Clinton Plan Intelligence'." The alleged plan was further described in a classified 29-page annex to the Durham report, which was not publicly released or declassified until July 31, 2025, two years after the publication of the main report.

She also cited a passage in which Durham characterized the intelligence as suggesting that individuals associated with Clinton's campaign sought to promote what he described as a misleading narrative about Trump's ties to Russia to both the public and U.S. government agencies.

"Durham noted in a footnote to this paragraph — oppo research is not itself illegal. It only becomes illegal if you intentionally lie to the government about it." She then quotes Durham's Footnote 393: "To be clear, the Office did not and does not view the potential existence of a political plan by one campaign to spread negative claims about its opponent as illegal or criminal in any respect."

==== Described as a conspiracy theory ====
Several sources have characterized Durham's "Clinton plan intelligence" formulation as a conspiracy theory.

Molly Roberts, a senior editor at Lawfare, wrote that Trump's "Grand Conspiracy" theory "fails on both the narrative and legal coherence fronts": "Its proponents allege a plot against Trump that somehow manages to connect Hillary Clinton, Barack Obama, and James Comey to Joe Biden, Merrick Garland, and Jack Smith." She frames the "Clinton plan" conspiracy theory as part of an alleged larger conspiracy against Trump. She also argued that proponents of the "Grand Conspiracy" theory often omitted that Durham had excluded the material from his report because it was assessed as likely based on forged documents, a fact she suggested would undermine the narrative.

David Corn described expectations among Trump allies and within MAGA that Durham's investigation would expose a broad deep state conspiracy involving Obama-era officials and Clinton's campaign to fabricate the Russiagate scandal, leading to prosecutions of those involved.

According to David Corn and Charlie Savage, Durham failed to substantiate claims of intelligence abuses or "Deep State" misconduct in the origins of the Russia investigation. Savage reported that, after failing to find such evidence, Barr and Durham shifted their focus toward seeking a basis to blame the Clinton campaign for the suspicions raised by the many secretive links that Trump campaign associates had to Russia.

=== Ratcliffe and first appearance of the theory in 2020 ===
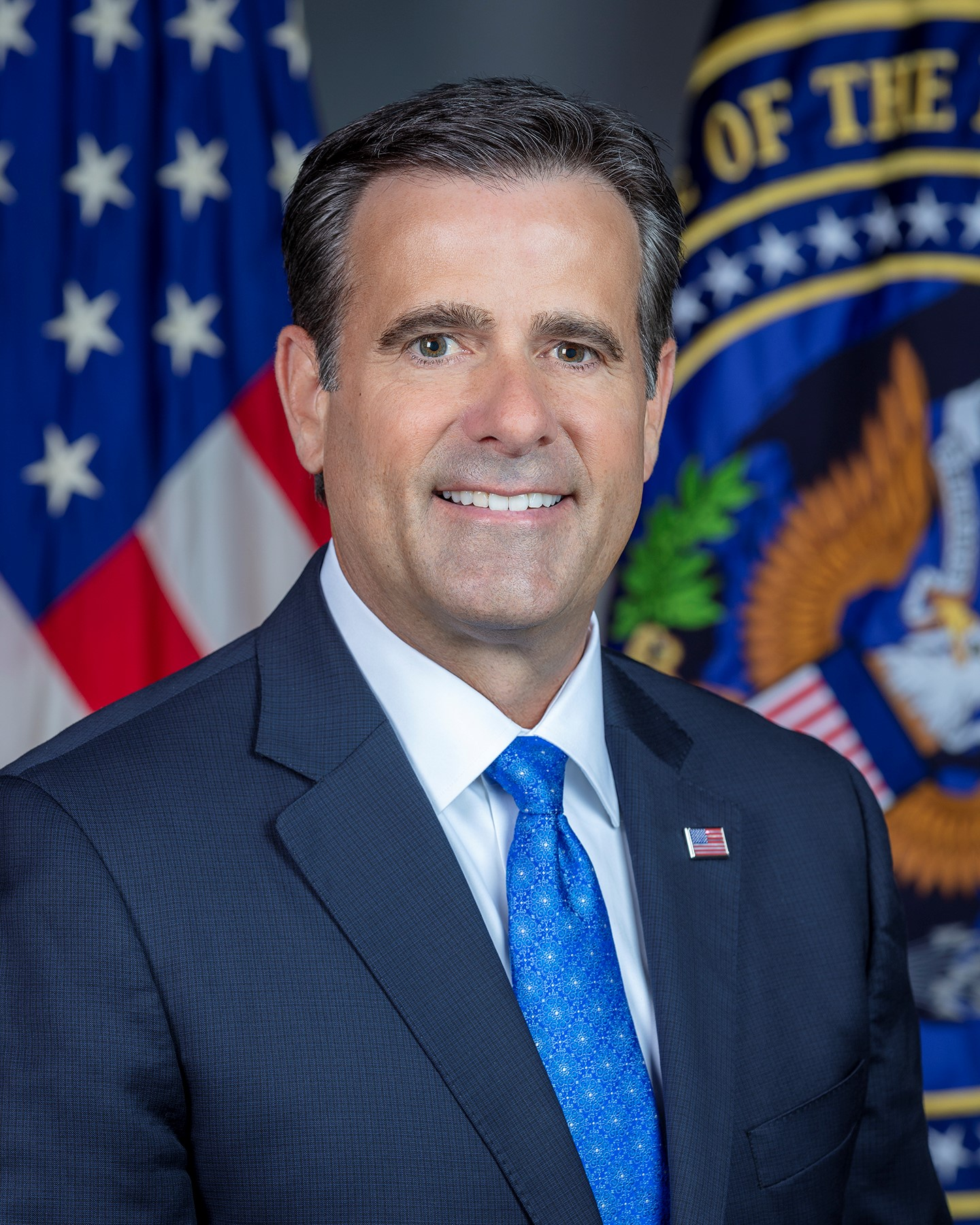
John Ratcliffe (2020)

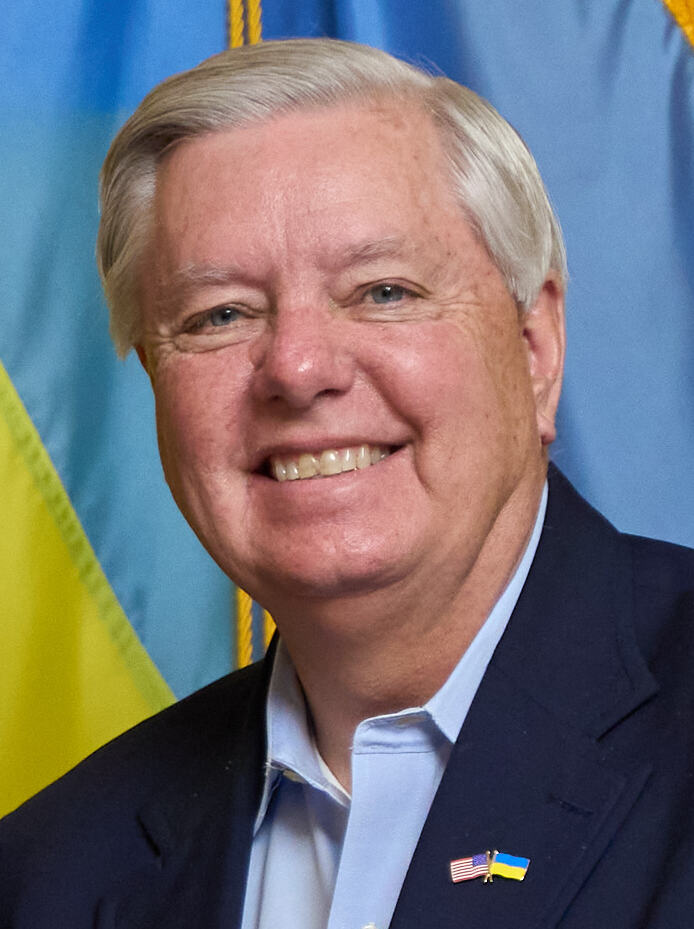
Lindsey Graham (2024)

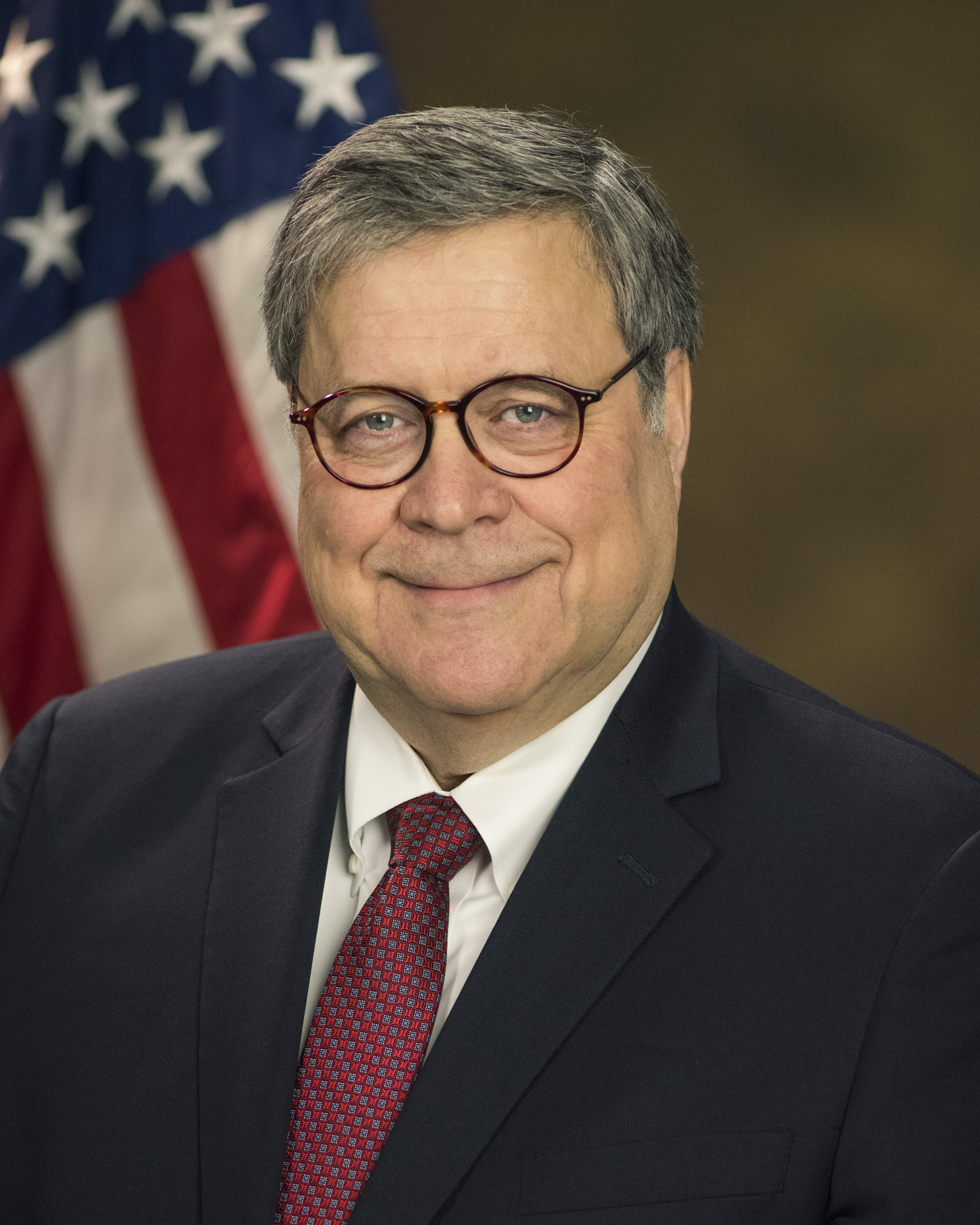
William Barr (2019)

In 2016, then-CIA director John Brennan briefed President Obama and other senior officials about the intelligence in August 2016 and referred it to the FBI. Two FBI assessments from 2016 and 2020 then found the Russian materials were "likely not credible", according to Lawfare.

Nevertheless, in October 2020, then–director of national intelligence John Ratcliffe declassified portions of Brennan's handwritten notes from the 2016 briefing. Ratcliffe stated that the intelligence community was unable to corroborate whether Russia actually knew of such a Clinton plan or whether the information was fabricated. He also declassified some other information from the hacked Russian memos, which he described in a letter to Senate Judiciary Committee chairman Lindsey Graham on September 29, 2020. Graham released it the same day.

The theory was first mentioned publicly by John Ratcliffe on September 29, 2020, near the end of Trump's first presidency, and "mere hours before the first Trump-Biden debate", a timing that was described by Judy Woodruff as a "possible abuse of intelligence and the levers of government by the Trump administration".

Others also criticized the release. Senator Mark Warner said it disturbed him that Ratcliffe was releasing unverified Russian "rumint" (rumored intelligence) "35 days before an election". Senator Ron Wyden said that "DNI Ratcliffe is abusing his position exactly as I feared he would, and the abuse is accelerating as we near the election." The material had already been examined by the bipartisan Senate Intelligence Committee and determined to be "Russian disinformation".

A fact-check by the Associated Press noted how the letter's release "hours before the first presidential debate in the upcoming election sparked a flurry of posts on social media, many of them misrepresenting its contents as proof of wrongdoing by Democrats".

Sonam Sheth reported that Ratcliffe's release of the material on September 29, 2020, appeared to "mirror Moscow's ongoing disinformation campaign against the former secretary of state".

Vox reported that Ratcliffe was criticized for giving credibility to Russian material by declassifying and releasing the information against the advice of intelligence officials and "without knowing its veracity", in what critics described as an effort to hurt Clinton while helping Trump during his debate with Joe Biden.

Brian Greer, a former CIA lawyer, criticized Ratcliffe's declassification decision, arguing that it was politically motivated, risked benefitting Russia, and could harm U.S. intelligence capabilities while undermining a U.S. political figure who may have been targeted by a hostile intelligence service.

Politico reported that Trump took advantage of the situation, "weaponizing the releases to boost his reelection campaign". Ratcliffe told CBS News that the declassification occurred "at the direction of President Trump".

Politico also reported that Durham was "expected to refrain from releasing any conclusions before Election Day to avoid affecting the race", but that recent declassifications by Ratcliffe and Attorney General William Barr appeared to be "an effort to fill that void".

According to CBS, "The unverified details contained in Ratcliffe's letter were released over the objections of senior intelligence officials from the CIA, NSA and Office of the Director of National Intelligence."

The New York Times also reported that Dutch intelligence was infuriated by the disclosure of information it had provided in the strictest confidence.

Former-CIA director John Brennan accused Ratcliffe of "selectively declassifying" information "to advance the political interests of Donald Trump", adding that even if the Russian allegations were accurate, there would be "nothing at all illegal" about Clinton highlighting Trump's reported connections to Russia.

Senator Ron Wyden accused Ratcliffe of politicization of "unverified Russian information to try to concoct a political scandal — a shocking abdication of his responsibilities to the country".

Cathy Young wrote: "Outside the MAGA camp, most people were appalled that Ratcliffe and Graham were laundering unverified intelligence at best and Russian disinformation at worst."

Career intelligence professionals expressed their concerns:

All of this is deeply troubling and threatens to politicize the intelligence community at a time when untainted, clear information is at a premium. 'He has declassified information for patently partisan reasons, and he has done so in an underhanded manner,' said John Sipher, who ran the CIA's Russia operations during a 28-year career in the agency's National Clandestine Service.
In one fell swoop, then, Ratcliffe may have tainted the reputation America's spy agencies try so hard to build. 'The damage to US intelligence will be difficult to undo for years,' said Alina Polyakova, president and CEO of the Center for European Policy Analysis in Washington, DC.

Mother Jones highlighted what it described as an "irony" in Durham's report, criticizing his reliance on a "sketchy intelligence product" that it said may itself have been Russian disinformation used to advance a partisan narrative. It argued that Durham used material of uncertain provenance while accusing the FBI of similar conduct and, in effect, providing political support to Trump and his allies.

The New York Times reported that the Trump administration and Republicans on the House Intelligence Committee cited claims from the Russian memos without emphasizing concerns that the material might contain misinformation.

While Brian Greer acknowledges that many sources consider the Russian memos to be "disinformation", he does not agree. He considers the memos as something the Russians were guarding and did not want released. He believes this made Ratcliffe's declassification even worse.

== The hacked emails ==
=== Russian hacking background ===
The hacked emails originated from a broader Russian government cyber-espionage campaign targeting Democratic Party organizations during the 2016 presidential election. Lawfare reported that the Russian military intelligence agency GRU hacked the Democratic National Committee, the Clinton campaign, and other organizations, and then selectively released the stolen material, often at strategically chosen moments to cause political damage.

In 2016, the Russians hacked the DNC, stole emails, and then leaked them. They did all this to harm Clinton and help Trump.

Then they manipulated some of those emails to create an unproven "Clinton plan" conspiracy theory to again harm Clinton and help Trump, and this disinformation was then relaundered to aid Trump's second election campaign.

=== Provenance of the purported emails ===
Lawfare analyzed the provenance of the purported emails and the two related memos, describing how they were said to have been obtained and later transmitted to U.S. authorities. In early 2016, "The SVR supposedly also obtained an email about a plan Clinton had approved to link Putin and Russian hackers to then-candidate Trump in order to distract the public from her email server scandal." The Durham annex "centers on communications from a source—referred to as T1—who provided the FBI with two memos and a set of emails. The memos appear to be Russian-written summaries of U.S. political events, one from January 2016, and another from March."

The emails were originally found in Russian intelligence memos in 2016 by Dutch intelligence hackers. Reporting later clarified that their provenance, described as a "game of spy telephone", was complicated: Russian intelligence first stole the emails from American targets; and the Dutch later hacked them from the Russians and shared them with U.S. intelligence.

The emails were subsequently released by Trump administration officials, who treated them as legitimate despite unresolved concerns about their handling and reliability, given that it was possible the Russians had "deliberately mixed in disinformation".

=== Authenticity and fabrication findings ===
Numerous reliable sources described the purported "Clinton plan intelligence" as likely Russian "disinformation" treated with caution by U.S. officials, who warned it could have been exaggerated or deliberately seeded by Russian actors. Reporting by The New York Times, PBS, and other outlets said investigators and intelligence officials viewed the material as possible or probable Russian disinformation and criticized its public release and political use despite doubts about its authenticity. Journalists and analysts have also described how promotion of the alleged "plan" has amplified Russian disinformation in a politically motivated manner that supports Trump.

The Washington Post reported that the Russian intelligence analysis described an alleged plan, approved on July 26, 2016, to damage Trump politically by amplifying the scandal surrounding the Russian hacking of Democratic Party targets. The memo characterized Trump as "the Russian candidate" and interpreted the "intrusion" as referring to Russian intelligence operations targeting Democratic organizations and the Clinton campaign, and framed the intrusion as benefiting Trump.

The emails later cited in support of the alleged "plan" were treated with caution by U.S. intelligence and were subsequently scrutinized by journalists and investigators, who raised significant doubts about their authenticity.

U.S. intelligence explained the reasons for their caution:

In 2016, a Dutch spy agency hacked a Russian spy agency and copied internal memos and messages by Russian intelligence analysts. The Russians were writing reports about various topics based on the emails of American victims of Russian hacking operations. The Dutch shared a copy of the trove with the United States.
From the beginning, U.S. officials have said, they viewed the material with caution. Among other things, some reports were said to make inconsistent or false claims — raising the possibility that Russians had exaggerated things for their own purposes, or knew the server was compromised and deliberately mixed in disinformation.

The New York Times reported that further examination of the emails revealed additional problems. The Dutch hackers found the emails in a Russian intelligence memo. They were purportedly written by Leonard Benardo of the Open Society Foundations. The Russians used different names for the alleged recipient, a "Julie", "Julia", or "Julianne Smith", who was a foreign policy adviser for the Clinton campaign. A July 25, 2016, email mentioned Putin and "claimed that a Clinton adviser was proposing a plan 'to demonize Putin and Trump,' adding, 'Later the F.B.I. will put more oil into the fire.'"

The reporting also noted that the Russians had "two different versions of the July 25 message — one that somehow had an additional sentence. And Mr. Benardo denied sending it, telling Mr. Durham's team that he did not know who 'Julie' was and would not use a phrase like 'put more oil into the fire.'" The Associated Press similarly reported that Benardo "told Durham's team he had never sent the email and the alleged recipient said she never recalled receiving it".

CNN reported that Durham's report concluded the purported emails at the heart of the theory "appear to be faked", and "that a portion of the alleged Benardo emails used verbatim lines from an entirely different email sent by a cybersecurity expert at a DC-based think tank". The New York Times likewise reported the emails were most likely a "composite of several emails" created by Russian spies using passages lifted from actual, unrelated hacked messages.

The Guardian wrote that Director of National Intelligence Tulsi Gabbard had hoped the Durham annex would uncover evidence supporting claims that Barack Obama and his national security team conspired against Donald Trump, but said the document instead contained "a deflating conclusion for Gabbard":

It confirms that Russian spies were behind the emails that were originally released as the result of a Russian cyber-hack of internal Democratic information channels and which Trump supporters believed showed the campaign of Hillary Clinton, his 2016 opponent, conspiring to accuse him of colluding with Moscow.

According to The New York Times, Durham concluded that in 2016 the Russians had "probably faked the key emails", and that the office's "best assessment" was that the July 25 and July 27 messages attributed to Leonard Benardo were composites assembled from multiple hacked emails originating from U.S.-based think tanks, including the Open Society Foundations, the Carnegie Endowment, and others.

The Russian memos claimed that Benardo and Democratic congresswoman Debbie Wasserman Schultz had discussed how then-attorney general Loretta Lynch had purportedly promised to keep the Hillary Clinton email investigation from going too far. Benardo and Schultz denied knowing each other. Durham twice asked federal judge Beryl Howell for an order to seize information about Benardo's emails; Howell twice denied the request, citing the weakness of the Russian memos. Durham then used his grand jury power to demand documents and testimony from the Foundation and Benardo regarding Benardo's emails. They complied with the demands rather than fight them in court, though The New York Times reported that line of inquiry appeared to have been a dead end.

Cathy Young, writing in The Bulwark, criticized The Federalist for its coverage of the alleged plan, arguing that a New York Times report correctly concluded that the declassified Durham annex undermined the "Clinton plan" allegations. She wrote that by 2025, "[W]e know these messages were Russian fabrications, because they were partly patched together from identical passages lifted from real emails by other people."

Charlie Savage and Adam Goldman reported that, in his investigation, Durham said that Julianne Smith did not recall proposing a strategy to link Trump to Russia to campaign leadership. However, she allowed that she may have discussed related ideas. She recalled internal discussions expressing concern that the D.N.C. hack posed a threat to the electoral system and that Trump and his advisers appeared to have troubling ties to Russia. She said it was also possible that someone had suggested distracting attention from the email investigation, though she did not specifically remember such a proposal.

=== Institutional and journalistic assessments ===
The Open Society Foundations rejected the allegations outright, calling the emails "crude forgeries" and stating that claims it helped orchestrate an FBI investigation were "outrageous and false" and grounded in "malicious disinformation" traced to Russian intelligence that was later used in a "politically motivated campaign".

Savage and Goldman wrote that Durham reported finding other materials using "the exact same or similar verbiage" as the questioned messages, including a July 25 email by a Carnegie Endowment cyberexpert expressing concern about the Russian hacking, language that was later "echoed, verbatim" in a message attributed to Benardo.

Commenting on Durham's findings, The Guardian wrote that although the annex was released in "heavily redacted form" and Durham upheld Benardo's disavowal, the emails in the Russian material appeared to have "been cobbled together from other individuals' emails to produce something more incriminating than the actuality".

== Kept in a classified annex for two years ==
=== Timeline of classification and release ===
On May 12, 2023, Durham submitted to Attorney General Merrick Garland a 306-page unclassified report for public release and a 29-page classified appendix (annex). On May 15, Garland publicly released the unclassified Durham report without substantive comment or redactions, stating that "Arrangements will be made for review of the classified appendix."

Two years later, the annex was declassified and released by Senator Chuck Grassley on July 31, 2025, following declassification approvals involving Pam Bondi, Kash Patel, and elements of the intelligence community.

=== Findings revealed by the annex ===
On the day the annex was released, Charlie Savage and Adam Goldman reported that Durham's own findings undermined claims that the Clinton campaign had conspired to frame Trump. They wrote that the annex indicated a key document underpinning that theory, a purported July 2016 email describing a plan to link Trump to Russia, was "most likely stitched together by Russian spies".

Lawfare similarly assessed that the material was likely kept classified because it was considered "highly likely a fabrication of Russian intelligence" intended to "create a false picture of the so-called Clinton plan", concluding that the document showed Russian operatives had forged material to implicate Clinton.

=== Contemporary reactions and political framing ===
Lawfare described how, following the annex's release, Kash Patel claimed that he found the document inside "burn bags" within a "secret room" at the FBI and delivered it to Senator Chuck Grassley, who posted it on his Senate website as newly declassified material.

Lawfare also described the rollout as "bizarre" and "pure political theater" designed "to conjure a little spy-movie mystique: burn bags, hidden rooms, Russian intrigue", and wrote that "Durham was a partisan actor; it's unclear why he wouldn't have raised the 'Clinton Plan' to tie Trump to Russia in the court of public opinion if there was enough evidence for it."

Cathy Young argued that there was a disconnect between Patel's claims and the contents of the Durham report, questioning why Durham would have confined supposedly explosive material to a classified annex.

Earlier fact-checking had similarly questioned the underlying intelligence. Saranac Hale Spencer, writing for FactCheck.org, examined claims that the alleged plan to "vilify" Trump was part of a "Russian collusion hoax" designed to attack Trump:

President Donald Trump and his supporters on social media are citing unverified 'Russian intelligence' from 2016 as evidence that Hillary Clinton 'was behind the entire Russian collusion hoax.' But that so-called intelligence is largely a reflection of publicly available information at the time. Federal investigations since then have documented multiple links between Trump associates and individuals tied to the Russian government.

== Relitigation in 2025 of Russian interference investigation findings ==
=== Trump administration relitigation efforts ===
Assessing Russian Activities and Intentions in Recent US Elections (January 6, 2017)

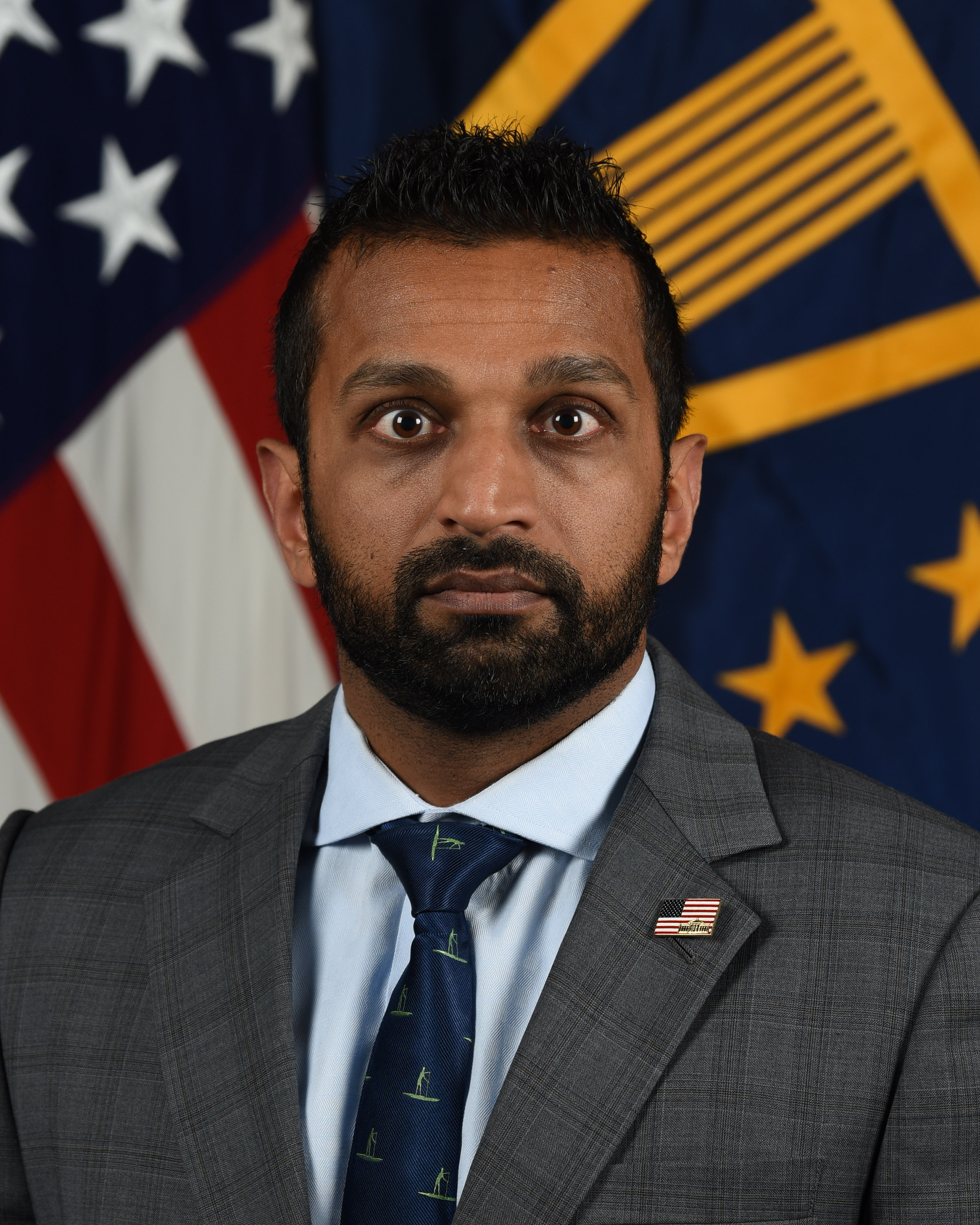
Kash Patel (2020)

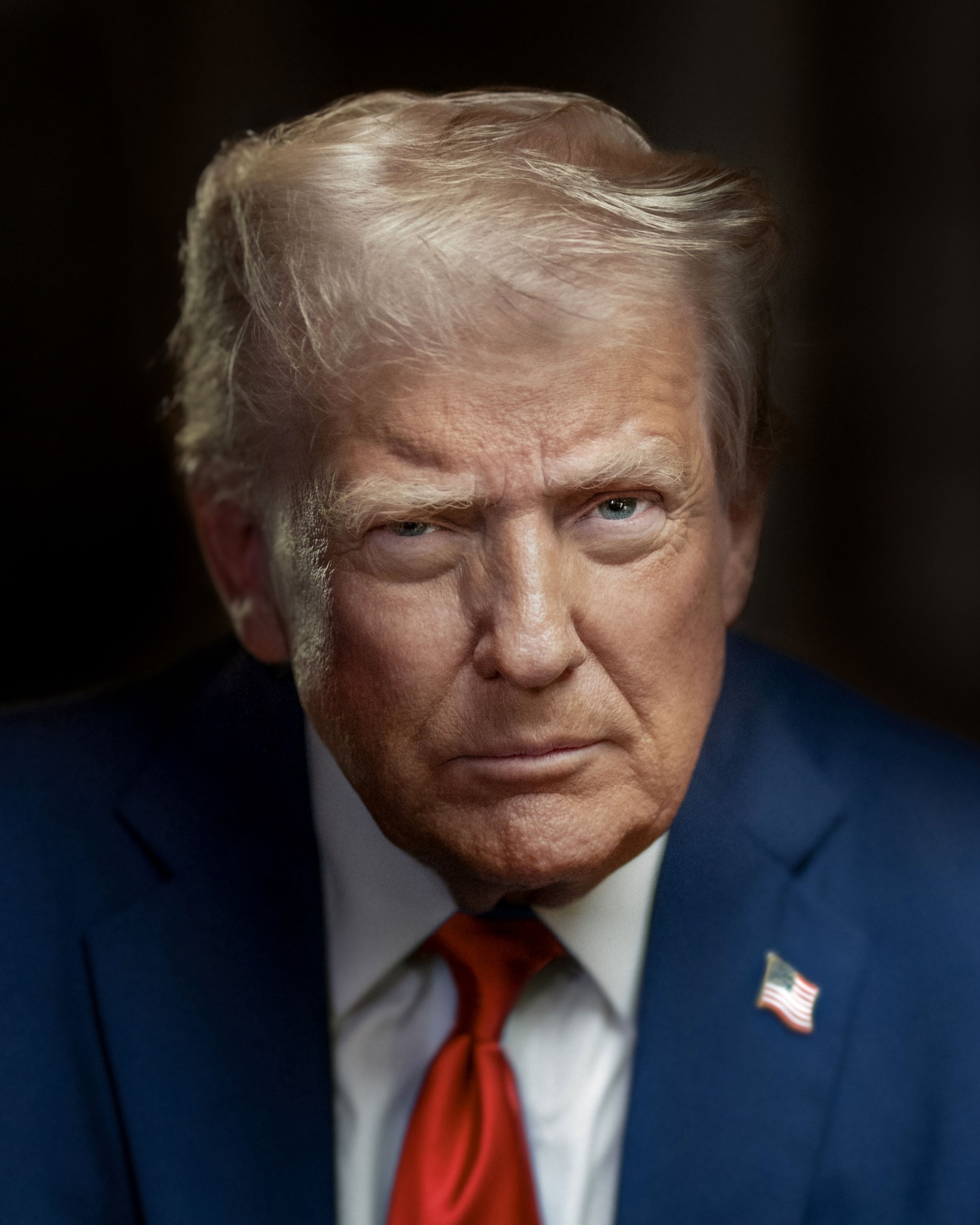
Donald Trump (2025)

In July 2025, senior Justice Department officials in the second Trump administration resumed efforts to relitigate and refute the findings of earlier investigations into the Russiagate scandal, which examined contacts involving Trump and Russia and Russia's interference in the 2016 United States elections. Those investigations had concluded that Vladimir Putin intervened in the 2016 contest to help Trump. The July 31, 2025, release of material related to the alleged "Clinton plan" formed part of these renewed relitigation efforts.

The Washington Post described the administration's actions as a series of "document dumps", reporting that senior intelligence and Justice Department officials released multiple batches of materials in an effort to "relitigate" the 2016 election and "refute earlier findings by multiple investigations" that Putin had intervened to help Trump.

Reporting identified the following Trump administration officials, Republican politicians, associates, and family members as publicly promoting or amplifying the alleged "Clinton plan" following the annex's release: Pam Bondi, Tulsi Gabbard, Chuck Grassley, Kayleigh McEnany, Kash Patel, John Ratcliffe, Lindsey Graham, and Donald Trump Jr.

Charlie Savage described the administration's declassification of a series of reports and documents as an attempt "to change the subject from its broken promise to release Jeffrey Epstein files".

Writers for The New York Times also noted a parallel set of accusations regarding motive. Trump's allies accused Clinton of advancing the alleged "Clinton plan" to distract from the scandal over her use of a personal email server while secretary of state, while Democrats accused Trump and his allies of reviving and relitigating the allegation to distract from the furor surrounding the Jeffrey Epstein files.

Many conservative media figures amplified the annex's claims and called for Hillary Clinton to face legal consequences, including Megyn Kelly, Benny Johnson, Byron York, Jesse Watters, Maria Bartiromo, Gregg Jarrett, Buck Sexton, Sean Hannity, James Lynch, Sean Spicer, Brian Kilmeade, and Sean Miller.

=== Denial of previous findings about Trump-Russia matters ===
Russian interference in the 2016 United States elections Joint Statement from the Department of Homeland Security and Office of the Director of National Intelligence on Election Security (October 7, 2016)

While Donald Trump and his surrogates have consistently denied or sought to minimize findings that Vladimir Putin intervened in the 2016 contest to help Trump, the conclusions of multiple investigations have contradicted those denials.

Trump and his supporters have sought to distance him, his campaign, and his election from Russian election interference, including allegations that Trump and his campaign "cooperated" with those efforts. (Note: Some points from the Democratic minority appendix to the Senate Intelligence Committee report: "The Committee's bipartisan Report unambiguously shows that members of the Trump Campaign cooperated with Russian efforts to get Trump elected."; "Candidate Trump and his Campaign responded to that threat by embracing, encouraging, and exploiting the Russian effort."; "The Committee's Report clearly shows that Trump and his Campaign were not mere bystanders in this attack - they were active participants. They coordinated their activities with the releases of the hacked Russian data, magnified the effects of a known Russian campaign, and welcomed the mutual benefit from the Russian activity."; "There may be some who attempt to minimize the seriousness of Trump's actions, or the actions of his associates, by arguing that these individuals were motivated simply by self-interest or self-promotion. This argument overlooks that when self-interest is intertwined with the goals of a malign Russian influence operation, and when self-interest promotes the known Russian effort while also being promoted by that same Russian effort, then self-interest and Russia's interest become one and the same. Moreover, this argument misunderstands the deep counterintelligence vulnerability that is created when those who seek positions of great power, or proximity to that power, are willing to trade away national security for personal gain."; "It is our conclusion, based on the facts detailed in the Committee's Report, that the Russian intelligence services' assault on the integrity of the 2016 U.S. electoral process and Trump and his associates' participation in and enabling of this Russian activity, represents one of the single most grave counterintelligence threats to American national security in the modern era.") Investigations and reporting have found that Trump and his associates made false denials and misleading statements about Russian election interference and their Russia-linked actions.

Reporting described these actions by Trump and senior intelligence officials as an effort to reinterpret or revise the public understanding of the 2016 election and the conclusions of the Mueller investigation and the FBI's Crossfire Hurricane inquiry.

Eric Tucker and Chris Megerian described the Durham report and its declassified annex as the administration's latest attempt to revisit the history of the Russia investigation, writing that the report "downplayed the extent of Russian interference in the 2016 election ...".

Although the existence of the alleged plan had been publicly known since at least 2020, in July 2025, senior administration officials renewed efforts to advance the alleged "Clinton plan" narrative, citing the disputed emails in an effort to relitigate the presidential election of nearly nine years earlier and refute prior investigative findings.

John Durham sought to determine whether the alleged "plan" represented a Democratic effort to frame Trump and fabricate the "Russia collusion hoax", but his investigation did not substantiate those claims.

Charlie Savage summarized the allegation as the theory that Clinton and her campaign knowingly put forward false information to frame Trump for collusion, thereby shifting blame for the suspicions that led to the Mueller investigation.

Democrats argued that allegations advanced by Trump officials such as Tulsi Gabbard were rebutted by the findings of the Durham investigation, the Mueller special counsel, the Justice Department inspector general, and the Senate Intelligence Committee, all of which concluded that Russia interfered in the 2016 election to help Trump.

=== Findings contradicting Trump's denials ===
The findings of multiple investigations have contradicted the denials by Trump and his surrogates. U.S. intelligence agencies, the January 2017 ODNI report, the Mueller special counsel investigation, the Inspector General's report, the Senate Intelligence Committee report, and the Durham special counsel investigation each found that Russia interfered in the 2016 election in a "sweeping and systematic fashion", including an influence campaign personally ordered by Vladimir Putin, and that the Russian government sought both to undermine public confidence in U.S. democratic processes and to favor Trump over Hillary Clinton. Russia carried out cyberattacks targeting both major political parties, but selectively released material stolen from Democratic organizations in order to harm Clinton's campaign. Several of these findings aligned with early reporting in the Steele dossier. (Note: Parts of dossier "prescient": Matthew Rosenberg wrote in 2019 that Parts of the dossier have proved prescient. Its main assertion – that the Russian government was working to get Mr. Trump elected – was hardly an established fact when it was first laid out by Mr. Steele in June 2016. But it has since been backed up by the United States' own intelligence agencies – and Mr. Mueller's investigation. The dossier's talk of Russian efforts to cultivate some people in Mr. Trump's orbit was similarly unknown when first detailed in one of Mr. Steele's reports, but it has proved broadly accurate as well.)

Investigations further documented secretive contacts between Trump campaign officials and Russian officials and agents, and concluded that the campaign's interactions with Russian intelligence services posed a "grave" counterintelligence threat. The Senate Intelligence Committee reported that members of the Trump campaign welcomed Russian election interference, expected to benefit from the Kremlin's help, were receptive to Russian assistance, and reacted by encouraging, exploiting, and coordinating with those efforts.

The Democratic minority appendix to the Senate Intelligence Committee report stated:

- "The Committee's bipartisan Report unambiguously shows that members of the Trump Campaign cooperated with Russian efforts to get Trump elected."
- "It is our conclusion, based on the facts detailed in the Committee's Report, that the Russian intelligence services' assault on the integrity of the 2016 U.S. electoral process and Trump and his associates' participation in and enabling of this Russian activity, represents one of the single most grave counterintelligence threats to American national security in the modern era."

Investigations and reporting also found that Trump and his associates made false denials and misleading statements about Russian election interference and their Russia-linked actions, and that Trump later engaged in conduct that obstructed investigations into these matters, as described by Mueller. PolitiFact named Trump's assertions "that Russia's meddling in the 2016 election is fake news, a hoax or a made-up story" as its "Lie of the Year" for 2017.

== Debate over characterization of Clinton campaign activity ==
=== Competing interpretations of campaign conduct ===
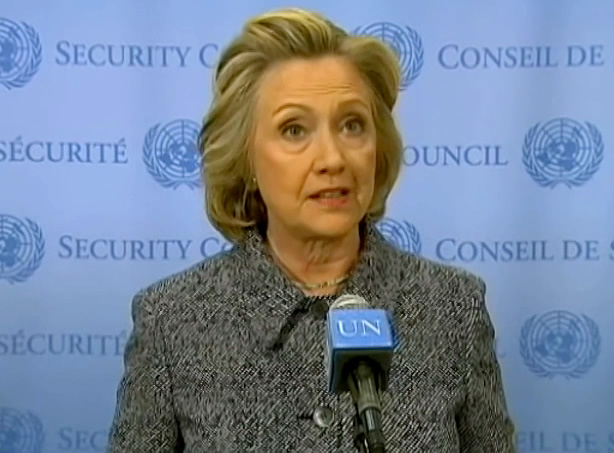
Clinton addressing email controversy with the media at the UN Headquarters on March 10, 2015

The "Clinton Plan" theory alleges that Hillary Clinton approved a campaign strategy to invent or amplify false claims tying Donald Trump to Russia and Vladimir Putin.

Critics of the "plan" theory argue that it improperly recasts Clinton's campaign messaging about Trump and Russia as a covert and false conspiracy. They contend that her public highlighting of Trump's statements and conduct regarding Russia, including his rejection of U.S. intelligence assessments in favor of Putin's denials, was factual and ordinary political advocacy rather than evidence of a coordinated and false scheme.

Trump did publicly express favorable views toward Russia and Putin, and Andrew Prokop wrote that there were defensible reasons to question Trump's Russia connections during the 2016 campaign, citing his more respectful stance toward Putin and skepticism of NATO, his public promotion of hacked Democratic emails, and his call for "Russia, if you're listening" to find additional Clinton emails.

Critics further noted that it was legal and politically routine for Clinton, as Trump's opponent, to highlight the publicly reported Russia-related connections involving Trump and his campaign. Clinton told Durham's office that "She had a lot of plans to win the campaign, and anything that came into the public domain was available to her."

Former CIA director John O. Brennan similarly stated that even if Clinton sought to emphasize reported connections between Trump and Russia, "there is nothing at all illegal about that". He said that efforts to portray such conduct as unlawful campaign activity were misplaced, adding: "John Ratcliffe and others are trying to portray this as unlawful activity that deserves follow-up investigation by the FBI. No. It was a campaign activity."

David Corn described Clinton's actions as a "natural" response to publicly known evidence of Russian interference and Trump's stance toward Russia, writing that "it would have been quite natural and not at all inappropriate" for her campaign to promote a narrative about Trump and Russia, and that there was no evidence that the alleged "Clinton Plan" had triggered the FBI investigation.

Writing for FactCheck.org, Saranac Hale Spencer wrote: "She was responding to Russia's actions and Trump's words. There is no evidence that she was responsible for the federal counterintelligence investigation into the Trump campaign ties with Russia."

The Washington Post reported that the Durham annex included emails among Clinton campaign aides discussing how Trump's ties to Russia could be used as campaign messaging, but found no proof that Clinton or senior Obama administration officials had "schemed to concoct" false links between Trump and Moscow, as alleged by Trump allies.

=== Timing and investigative trigger ===
Commentators including Philip Bump and Dan Friedman have examined the chronology, arguing that the timeline undercut allegations made by Trump administration officials. They noted that rather than a "plan" by Clinton triggering investigations into Trump's relations with Russia and its efforts to help his electoral chances, her campaign was highlighting developments that were already underway and publicly known.

Philip Bump challenged the claim that linking Trump to Russia was itself a dishonest political tactic invented by Clinton's campaign. He presented a timeline showing that substantial public evidence of Trump-Russia connections already existed by the time the alleged "plan" was said to have been created. The Washington Post similarly noted that by the time of the alleged plan, numerous events were already publicly known, including Trump's public appeal to Russia to find Clinton's emails, Paul Manafort's hiring, Carter Page's Moscow visit, the hacking of the Democratic National Committee, and the release of stolen materials.

By this point, you'll recall, all of the aforementioned factors were already in play: Trump asking the Russians to hack, his hiring Manafort, Page's Moscow visit, the hack of the DNC and release of material from it, the Australians getting their hackles up. If Hillary Clinton was behind the plan to link Trump to Russia, she had a lot of very unexpected allies in doing so.

Dan Friedman also emphasized the timing, arguing that Durham's attempt to attribute the origins of the Russia investigation to Clinton's alleged July 26 approval was chronologically implausible. He wrote that multiple factors prompting the FBI to open an investigation were already in motion before that date, concluding: "This isn't just false. It would require time travel. Durham himself confirms that the FBI launched its investigation into Trump and Russia based on events that occurred months prior to Clinton's alleged July 26 approval of the plan."

Some Trump administration officials and conservative commentators have claimed that the alleged "Clinton plan" or the Steele dossier triggered the FBI's "Crossfire Hurricane" investigation into secretive contacts between Trump associates and Russian officials. Reporting has identified the investigation's trigger as a tip from the Australian government concerning comments by a Trump campaign adviser, rather than the supposed "Clinton plan" conspiracy theory or the Steele dossier.

== Investigations and findings ==
The investigations by the FBI and by Special Counsel John Durham addressed the allegation separately and reached different procedural conclusions regarding its handling, though neither established evidence of a coordinated campaign plot.

=== FBI's investigation ===
Lawfare stated that the "FBI assessed these materials in 2016 and again in 2020. It concluded the memos were likely not credible."

The New York Times described how the Durham report's declassified annex documented that the FBI investigated the alleged "Clinton plan" but was "ultimately unable to verify that such a plot existed".

The Washington Post described how the Russian document had influenced the FBI's investigation into Clinton's use of a private server and was unreliable, possibly fake, and "bad intelligence": "Investigators have long doubted its veracity, and by August the FBI had concluded it was unreliable."

Although the FBI investigated the allegation, John Durham was not satisfied with their efforts: "Durham's 2023 report chastised the FBI for not investigating the issue as aggressively as it had probed Trump's ties to Russia."

Durham argued that the government's handling of the "Clinton Plan intelligence" reflected potential investigative bias and reliance on uncorroborated, politically funded reporting intended to influence the FBI, but concluded: "It did not, all things considered, however, amount to a provable criminal offense."

The allegation was notable enough that CIA Director John Brennan briefed president Obama and vice-president Biden about it, but, because the FBI had investigated the allegation and was skeptical of the validity of the emails, it did not devote the same amount of effort to its investigation as it did to investigating the many sources of information documenting the Russian efforts to interfere in the election. Most FBI agents who were asked by Durham's team about the allegation said they were not aware of it, and attitudes toward it varied among agents. One agent, who had not heard of the allegation, was visibly moved and expressed "a sense of betrayal that no one had informed him". Other agents "either didn't buy that the claim was accurate, or thought Durham's team was wildly exaggerating its importance. Another agent, who did recall seeing the intelligence, told Durham's investigators that it was 'just one data point.'"

=== Durham's investigation ===
Durham's 2023 final report, and later-declassified 29-page annex to that report, reveal he investigated the alleged plan and was unsuccessful in his efforts to prove the alleged "plan" was a Democratic plot to frame Trump and "fabricate the Russia collusion hoax".

Durham acknowledged that the "Clinton Plan intelligence" originated from "a foreign adversary" and that its accuracy was unknown and might reflect "exaggeration or fabrication", as noted by DNI John Ratcliffe, but said his office nonetheless investigated its credibility and potential implications.

Durham's investigation devoted "significant attention", spread across 17 pages, to the alleged plan. The New York Times mentioned the name given to it by Durham: "Among some Trump supporters, the message became known as the 'Clinton Plan intelligence,' as Mr. Durham put it in his final report." His report mentioned the phrases "Clinton Plan intelligence" (65 times), "Clinton campaign plan" (six times), and "Clinton plan" (or just "plan" when referring to it).

In May 2022, Durham's office interviewed Clinton about the allegation, and when asked if she had reviewed the declassified information about her alleged plan, "She said that it 'looked like Russian disinformation to me; they're very good at it, you know.'" She continued, saying that "She had a lot of plans to win the campaign, and anything that came into the public domain was available to her."

Lawfare describes Durham's four reasons why the "memos were likely not credible":

Page 5 of the annex gives four reasons why: hearsay, exaggeration, editorialization, and translation issues. The emails were additionally perceived as suspect. Durham notes that as he progressed through his investigation, there were disagreements about their authenticity among intelligence analysts who read them—some thought the emails might be real; others flagged inconsistencies. But, as the investigation continued, as the annex relates, the case for forgery grew stronger.

==== Failure to prove "plan" existed ====
Trump-appointed special counsel John Durham also examined the alleged "plan", but his attempts failed to prove the alleged plan existed, and rather than confirming the alleged plan, Durham's descriptions of the dubious nature of the hacked emails were characterized by The New York Times as a "debunking".

Durham described the lack of evidence for FBI or CIA involvement, writing that while his investigation identified "potential confirmation bias" in the handling of the intelligence, it did not produce evidence "sufficient to prove beyond a reasonable doubt" that officials intentionally advanced a Clinton campaign plan to frame Trump or misused the intelligence in FISA applications.

Senator Mark Warner stated:

After years of investigation, John Durham confirmed what we already knew: There was no grand conspiracy to frame Donald Trump. ... What we do know, from the bipartisan Senate Intelligence Committee report and multiple independent investigations, is that Russia interfered in our elections in order to help Trump win.

Jude Sheerin, writing for BBC News, stated that "There is nothing illegal about a political smear, but Trump allies suggested the email, if genuine, showed that federal investigators could have been part of the scheme. Durham, however, found no proof of such an FBI conspiracy."

The New York Times cited a concern expressed by Durham: "'Whether or not the Clinton Plan intelligence was based on reliable or unreliable information, or was ultimately true or false,' Mr. Durham wrote, agents should have been more cautious when approaching material that appeared to have partisan origins."

==== Criticisms of Durham ====
Criticizing John Durham and his investigation, David Frum described the alleged "Clinton plan" as part of Donald Trump's broader claims of "anti-Trump plotting", writing that "fossilized versions of this defunct counter-allegation can be found strewn through the text of the Durham report" and that Durham ultimately "reconciles himself to the delusionary nature of the so-called Clinton Plan" while acknowledging Russian interference in the 2016 election.

Other commentators likewise argued that Durham's claims amounted to sweeping and unsubstantiated insinuations. Vox wrote that his claims of a vast conspiracy "fell flat" and amounted to "extremely weak stuff", while The New York Times reported that Durham had relegated to a classified annex evidence supporting Clinton's rebuttal, including a conclusion that the purported "Clinton Plan intelligence" was almost certainly Russian disinformation.

Lawmakers and analysts also said Durham suggested wrongdoing without producing charges. Representative Jerry Nadler stated that Durham accused the Clinton campaign of a conspiracy tying Trump to Russia yet "never found what he was looking for", and reporting noted that Durham used court filings to insinuate a theory he did not ultimately charge, thus providing fodder for conservative media coverage.

== Broader assessments of veracity ==
Multiple official reviews and independent news organizations evaluated the credibility of the purported Russian intelligence and the alleged "Clinton plan" and found no verified evidence that such a coordinated campaign plot existed.

The FBI assessed the underlying materials in both 2016 and 2020 and concluded the memos were likely not credible. Reporting on the Durham report's declassified annex likewise noted that the FBI had investigated the allegation but was "ultimately unable to verify that such a plot existed".

In 2020, Director of National Intelligence John Ratcliffe stated that U.S. intelligence agencies "do not know the accuracy of this allegation or the extent to which the Russian intelligence analysis may reflect exaggeration or fabrication". Durham's own annex later acknowledged that his office could not "determine definitely" whether the intelligence was "entirely genuine, partially true, a composite pulled from multiple sources, exaggerated in certain respects, or fabricated in its entirety". Although Durham devoted significant attention to the allegation, he did not establish proof of a coordinated Clinton campaign conspiracy.

News organizations similarly reported that Durham's findings did not substantiate the theory. The Washington Post wrote that the report "contains no proof" that Clinton or senior Obama administration officials schemed to fabricate false links between Trump and Moscow. CNN reported that the emails central to the theory "appear to be faked". The New York Times stated that Durham "was never able to prove any Clinton campaign conspiracy to frame Mr. Trump".

In 2020, an Associated Press fact check rated as "False" claims that a declassified intelligence letter proved Clinton planned the so-called "Russia hoax", concluding that the letter "in no way proves it was 'Hillary's plan' to look into ties between Trump associates and Russian officials".

== See also ==
- Durham special counsel investigation#Clinton plan intelligence conspiracy theory
- Information laundering
- Information warfare
- List of conspiracy theories promoted by Donald Trump
- Russia investigation origins conspiracy theory
