= Rodney Joffe =

South African/American entrepreneur

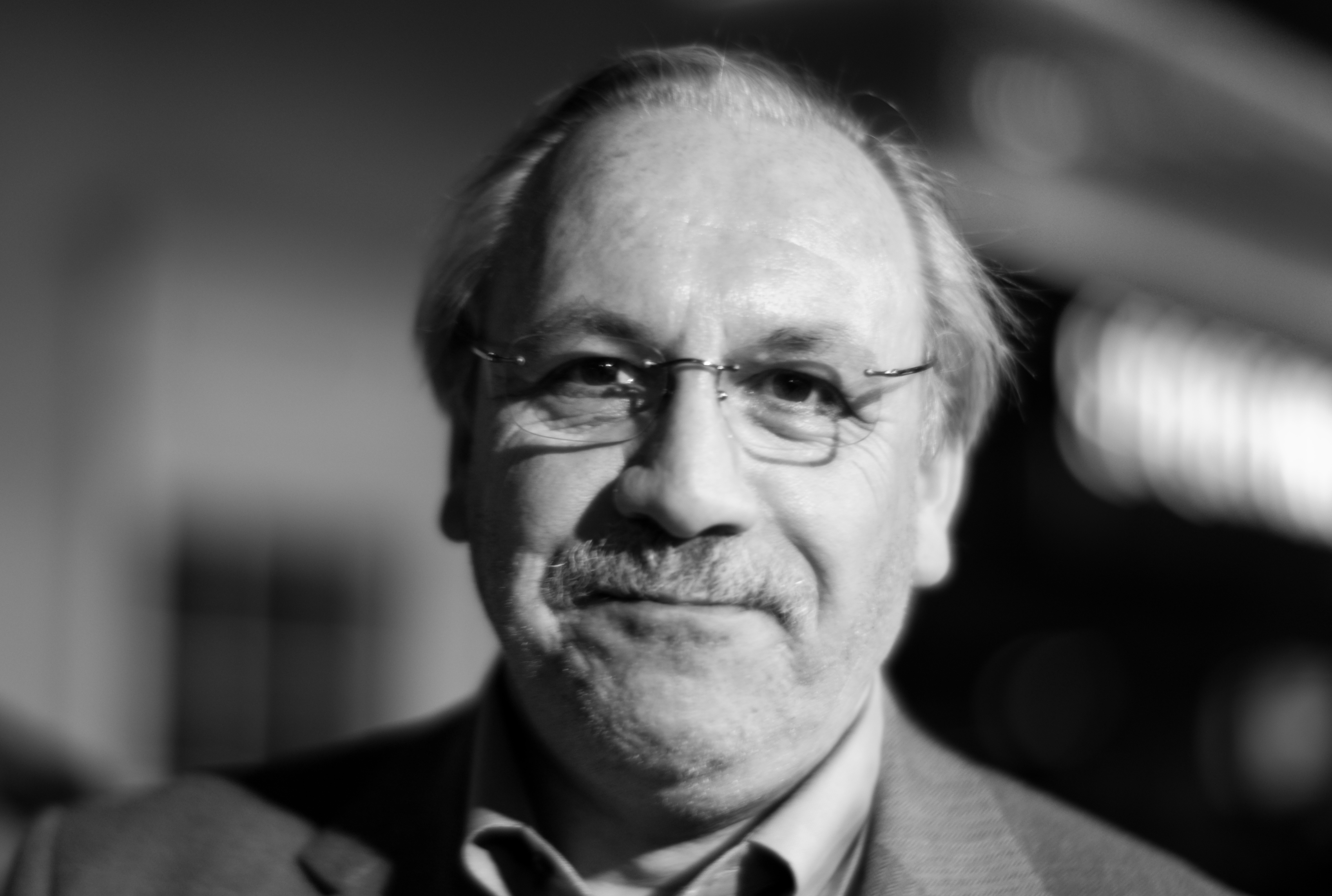
- Born: Rodney Lance Joffe; 1954 (age 71–72); South Africa
- Other names: Max
- Citizenship: American
- Occupation: Computer scientist
- Known for: Computer security

Rodney Joffe is a South African/American entrepreneur and cybersecurity expert. He is a recipient of the FBI's Director's Award for Outstanding Cyber Investigation for his role in uncovering the Mariposa botnet.

== Early life ==
Joffe was born in South Africa. He has been involved in information technology since 1973, when he trained as a systems analyst and programmer in the pensions actuarial group of the Old Mutual Life Insurance Company in Cape Town.

== Career ==
Joffe is credited with creating web site hosting company Genuity (Internet company), as well as UltraDNS, a domain name service company which was sold to Neustar in 2006. He retired from Neustar in September, 2021.

From 2009-2010, Joffe was Director of the Conficker Working Group.

== Durham inquiry ==
On September 15, 2021, Internet researchers successfully extrapolated information from civil litigation brought by Alfa Bank and other open source data to identify Joffe as "Max" from Dexter Filkins' New Yorker articles about Alfa-Bank and The Trump Organization, in addition to being a client of Michael Sussmann.

On September 30, 2021, Joffe was confirmed to be Tech Executive-1.

In a February 2022 court motion related to Michael Sussmann's prosecution, Special Counsel Durham alleged that Joffe and his associates had exploited access his company had through a pending cybersecurity contract with the Executive Office of the President (EOP) to acquire nonpublic government domain name system and other data traffic "for the purpose of gathering derogatory information about Donald Trump." Durham did not allege that any eavesdropping of Trump communications content occurred, and on March 4, 2022, he dropped these claims against Joffe.

A spokesman for Joffe released a statement asserting that his client had lawful access under a contract to analyze White House DNS data for potential security threats. The spokesman stated that Joffe's work was in response to hacks of the EOP in 2015 and of the DNC in 2016, as well as Russian YotaPhone queries in proximity to the EOP and the Trump campaign, that raised "serious and legitimate national security concerns about Russian attempts to infiltrate the 2016 election". According to Joffe's spokesman, "deeply concerned" cybersecurity researchers prepared a report "about the anomalies they found in the data" and shared it with the CIA.

== Awards ==
In 2013, Joffe received the FBI's Director's Award for Outstanding Cyber Investigation for his role in uncovering the Mariposa botnet.

In 2015, Joffe received the Mary Litynski Lifetime Achievement Award from M3AAWG, for his lifetime work in fighting text spam, malware and DDoS attacks.

In 2018, Joffe received the Contribution to Cyber Security Award, presented at the 2018 Computing Security Awards.

Three years in a row from 2018-2020, Joffe was named Cybersecurity Professional of the Year, at the Cybersecurity Excellence Awards.

== Patents ==
1. Distributed computing system and method for distributing user requests to replicated network servers - Hopscotch - US 8,683,075
2. Domain name system and method of operating using restricted channels - US 9,871,794
3. Domain name system and method of operating using restricted channels - US 10,356,097
4. Method And System For Detecting Network Compromise - US 9,356,942
5. Method And System For Detecting Network Compromise - Continuation - US 9,674,222
6. Method and apparatus for balancing the process load on network servers according to network and serve based policies - US 6,185,619
7. Method and system for detecting network compromise - US 10,230,761
8. Multi-tenant unit - US 6,144,638
9. Secure Domain Name System - US 9,648,004
10. Secure Domain Name System - US 9,172,713
