= James A. Baker (government attorney) =

American lawyer

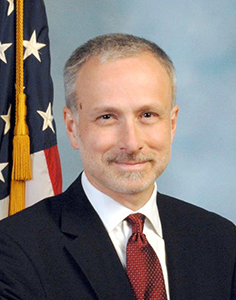

General Counsel of the Federal Bureau of Investigation
- In office January 2014 – December 2017
- President: Barack Obama; Donald Trump
- Director: James Comey; Andrew McCabe (acting); Christopher A. Wray
- Preceded by: Andrew Weissmann
- Succeeded by: Dana J. Boente

Personal details
- Born: James Andrew Baker
- Education: University of Notre Dame (BA); University of Michigan (JD, MA)
- Workplace: R Street Institute; Harvard Law School

James Andrew Baker is a former American government official at the Department of Justice who served as general counsel for the Federal Bureau of Investigation (FBI) and later served as deputy general counsel at Twitter, Inc. before being fired by Elon Musk in December 2022.

A graduate of the University of Notre Dame and the University of Michigan Law School, he joined the Department of Justice in 1990.

In December 2017, he was replaced as general counsel and reassigned to a different position within the FBI. It was revealed in April 2018, that he was a recipient of at least one Comey memo. In May 2018, Baker resigned from the FBI and joined the Brookings Institution as a fellow, writing for the justice-focused website, Lawfare. In January 2019, Baker left Brookings to become director of national security and cybersecurity at the R Street Institute think-tank.

Baker also teaches at Harvard Law School.

== Education ==
Baker is a graduate of the University of Notre Dame College of Arts and Letters and received a J.D. and M.A. from the University of Michigan in 1988. Baker has taught national security law at Harvard Law School since 2009.

== Career ==
=== Government service ===
Baker joined the Criminal Division of the Department of Justice through the Attorney General's Honors Program in 1990 and went on to work as a federal prosecutor with the division's fraud section. In 1996 he joined Office of Intelligence Policy and Review (OIPR). This government agency handles all Justice Department requests for surveillance authorizations under the terms of the 1978 Foreign Intelligence Surveillance Act, advises the Attorney General and all major intelligence-gathering agencies on legal issues relating to national security and surveillance, and "coordinates" the views of the intelligence community regarding intelligence legislation. Baker has often testified before Congress on behalf of Clinton and Bush administration intelligence policies, including defending The Patriot Act before the House Judiciary Committee. Regarding Baker's 2007 appearance on the PBS Frontline episode, "Spying on the Home Front", the show's producer, in a Washington Post online chat, referred to Baker as, " FISA himself".

In 1998, Baker was promoted to deputy counsel for intelligence operations. From May 2001 he served as acting counsel, and in January 2002 was appointed counsel. In January 2014, he was appointed general counsel of the FBI. As of December 2017, newly appointed director Christopher A. Wray reassigned him from this role with his new duties unclear. On May 4, 2018, Baker resigned from the FBI.

=== Private sector ===
Baker's government service was interrupted twice by stints in the private sector. Baker was assistant general counsel for national security at Verizon Business from 2008 to 2009. He was associate general counsel with Bridgewater Associates from 2012 to 2014. He worked as director of National Security and Cybersecurity for the non-partisan, right-center leaning think-tank R Street Institute between January 2018 and June 2020.

Baker served as deputy general counsel at Twitter, Inc. from June 2020 to December 2022, until being fired publicly by CEO Elon Musk. Following the disclosure of internal Twitter communications ("Twitter Files") regarding limiting the distribution of a news article concerning materials from Hunter Biden's laptop on the platform in the leadup to the 2020 presidential election, Musk expressed concerns about Baker's possible role in its suppression and his alleged interference in the publication of "Twitter Files" as reasons for his termination.

== Controversies ==
=== NSA surveillance ===
In 2004, according to The Washington Post, Baker was responsible for the discovery that "the government's failure to share information" regarding the NSA electronic surveillance program had "rendered useless a federal screening system" insisted upon by the United States Foreign Intelligence Surveillance Court to prevent "tainted information"—in U.S. case law, "fruit of the poisonous tree"—from being used before the court. Baker was reported to have informed presiding federal judge Colleen Kollar-Kotelly of the FISC, whose complaints to the Justice Department led to the temporary suspension of the NSA program.

In 2007, according to The Washington Post, Baker revealed that he had informed Attorney General Alberto Gonzales "about mistakes the FBI has made or problems or violations or compliance incidents" prior to Gonzales' April 2005 testimony before the Senate Judiciary Committee that "[t]here has not been one verified case of civil liberties abuse" after 2001.

=== Alleged leaking ===
In 2017, Circa reported that Baker was under a Department of Justice criminal investigation for allegedly leaking classified national security information concerning the Trump administration to the media. The probe, described as "a strange interagency dispute that ... attracted the attention of senior lawmakers", reportedly "ended with a decision not to charge anyone," per The Washington Post.

=== 2016 presidential election investigation ===
On May 10, 2019, Baker was interviewed for a taped Lawfare podcast, a justice-focused blog, during which he discussed his role in the FBI investigation of events during the 2016 presidential election that would be taken over by Robert S. Mueller III. Previously Baker had refrained from making public comment. He stated that he felt compelled to speak publicly now that the report is public and being characterized adversely by Trump and some members of his administration.

In September 2021, Special Counsel John Durham indicted Michael Sussmann, a partner for the law firm Perkins Coie, alleging he falsely told Baker during a September 2016 meeting that he was not representing a client for their discussion. Durham alleged Sussman was actually representing "a U.S. Technology Industry Executive, a U.S. Internet Company and the Hillary Clinton Presidential Campaign." Sussmann focuses on privacy and cybersecurity law and had approached Baker to discuss what then appeared to be suspicious communications between computer servers at the Russian Alfa-Bank and the Trump Organization. Sussmann had represented the Democratic National Committee regarding the Russian hacking of its computer network. Sussmann's attorneys denied he was representing the Clinton campaign and he pleaded not guilty to the charge. Sussmann would later be found not guilty by a jury.

=== Views on encryption ===
Baker was the FBI's general counsel during the FBI–Apple encryption dispute, and took credit for "leading" the bureau's efforts to access the suspect's iPhone. During that dispute, the FBI asked Apple to create a backdoor that would allow the iPhone's passcode to be bruteforced.

Baker had long supported legislation requiring encryption systems to include a means to allow access by law enforcement with a proper warrant, as a way to address a phenomenon law enforcement officers call "going dark". In a published essay and press interview, Baker announced his decision to "rethink [his] prior beliefs about encryption", and "embrace [the] reality" that Congress would not pass laws mandating backdoors in consumer devices. He called for the U.S. to embrace a zero trust security model, and said that "public safety officials should also become among the strongest supporters of widely available strong encryption".

== See also ==
- Timeline of investigations into Donald Trump and Russia
