= R Street Institute =

American political advocacy organization

Coordinates: 38.9035°N 77.0218°W

- Formation: 2012
- Type: Think tank
- Headquarters: 1411 K Street N.W., Suite 900; Washington, D.C. 20005
- Location: Washington, D.C.
- President: Eli Lehrer
- Revenue: $15.1 million (2024)
- Expenses: $14.5 million (2024)
- Staff: 90 (2024)
- Volunteers: 10 (2024)
- Website: www.rstreet.org

The R Street Institute is an American center-right think tank headquartered in Washington, DC. Its stated mission is to "engage in policy research and outreach to promote free markets and limited, effective government." R Street was established in 2012, when its founders split from the Heartland Institute out of disagreement with Heartland's public denial of the scientific consensus on climate change. R Street has branch offices across the United States.

== History ==
=== Formation ===
On Thursday, May 3, 2012, the Heartland Institute launched a digital billboard ad campaign in the Chicago area featuring a photo of Ted Kaczynski, the "Unabomber," with the caption "I still believe in global warming, do you?" Heartland planned for the campaign to later feature cult leader Charles Manson, the Cuban communist leader Fidel Castro, and perhaps Osama bin Laden asking the same question. In a statement, Heartland justified the billboards by stating that "the most prominent advocates of global warming aren't scientists. They are murderers, tyrants, and madmen." Facing public backlash to the billboards, Heartland canceled its campaign within 24 hours.

The leadership of Heartland's Washington-based Center on Finance, Insurance and Real Estate, whose work had often been entwined with environmental policies, was quoted in the wake of the billboard campaign as noting that it had learned of the campaign only from an emailed press release and that it reflected poorly on the center. On May 11, 2012, Heartland announced that the center would spin off into a separate organization, effective May 31.

On May 14, 2012, Slate reported that the spin-off group would be dubbed the R Street Institute and quoted spokesman R.J. Lehmann as noting that unlike Heartland, R Street "will not promote climate change skepticism." Following R Street's break from Heartland, climate activist group Forecast the Facts estimated that roughly $1.3 million of Heartland's proposed $2.3 million in projected corporate funding had been withdrawn, as the donors Pfizer, Amgen, LKQ, Credit Union National Association, GlaxoSmithKline, Bayer, Verizon, the Wisconsin Insurance Alliance, BB&T, PepsiCo, Farmers Insurance Group, Eli Lilly, USAA, Nationwide Mutual Insurance Co., RenaissanceRe, XL Group, Allied World Assurance Co., State Farm, Diageo, ABIR, and General Motors had either pulled their sponsorships or announced that they would not support Heartland in the future.

=== CARES Act funding ===
During the 2020 COVID-19 pandemic, the group received assistance between $1 million and $2 million in federally backed small business loans from Sandy Spring Bank as part of the Paycheck Protection Program. The nonprofit stated it would allow them to retain 61 jobs. The R Street Institute was one of several libertarian groups to receive assistance through the CARES Act. Its president stated that it supported the Act, as well as making all PPP loan applicants public: "Our position has never been that the government had no role in the economy...[this] is exactly the sort of situation where we do support government intervention."

== Name ==
The Institute describes the rationale behind its name:

Driving northwest from the center of the city, R Street is the first largely residential street to intersect with one of Washington, D.C.'s major arteries—Connecticut Ave. R Street divides lobbyists' glass office buildings and politicians' neo-classical palaces from neighborhoods where people live, work, fall in love, have children, pursue happiness and seek out practical solutions to their own problems. And that's where the R Street Institute wants to be: at the intersection of public policy thought and real life.

== Policy areas ==
The R Street Institute cites its major areas of operation as domestic policy challenges involving regulation, public health, environmental policy, entitlement reform, social security reform, criminal justice, cybersecurity, and the federal budget. The institute is known within the insurance community for its work on catastrophe insurance issues, including through its role as a member of the SmarterSafer.org coalition, a "diverse chorus of voices united in favor of environmentally responsible, fiscally sound approaches to natural catastrophe policy that promote public safety." In addition to R Street, SmarterSafer includes environmental organizations like American Rivers and the National Wildlife Federation; taxpayer groups like Taxpayers for Common Sense and the National Taxpayers Union; and insurance companies Allianz, Chubb Corp., Liberty Mutual, USAA, and Swiss Re.

The institute's flagship publication, initiated while it was still a part of Heartland, is an annual Insurance Regulation Report Card, a state-by-state study of the United States insurance regulatory system, examining which states are doing the best job of regulating insurance through limited, effective and efficient government. The 2012 report card measured states on 14 variables, including the concentration of home and auto insurance markets and the relative size of residual markets; the effectiveness of state solvency and fraud regulation; the transparency and politicization of insurance regulation; the tax and fee burden placed on insurance markets and the proportion of fees used to support insurance regulation; and the relative freedom granted to insurers to set risk-based rates, including through the use of credit and territorial information. Vermont was judged to have the best environment for insurance regulation, and Florida, the lone state to earn an F grade, was judged to have the worst.

The institute has also worked on environmental projects, including co-sponsoring the annual Green Scissors report with Friends of the Earth and Taxpayers for Common Sense. The 2012 report recommended nearly $700 billion in cuts to wasteful and environmentally harmful federal spending. In 2016, Green Scissors released an online database identifying over $250 billion of what it characterized as wasteful federal subsidies that were directed to polluting industries, "including more than 70 spending programs and tax expenditures that could be cut from the federal budget simultaneously to save tax dollars and improve the environment." The institute has also published papers advocating linking the Federal Crop Insurance program to conservation compliance standards and withholding state insurance subsidies in coastal regions of Florida.

In addition to its insurance and environmental work, R Street has published research on member business lending by credit unions, tobacco harm reduction and tax reform. National security is a topic of the subject's interest mainly as cybersecurity and emerging threats policy research.

== Staff ==
R Street's founding staff were all former employees for the Heartland Institute's Center on Finance, Insurance and Real Estate, who resigned en masse following Heartland's Unabomber billboard campaign. They included President Eli Lehrer, Editor-in-Chief R.J. Lehmann, Southeast Region Director Christian Cámara and Midwest Region Director Alan Smith.

That group has since been joined by, among others, Distinguished Senior Fellow Mike Godwin, the originator of Godwin's law; Distinguished Senior Fellow Alex J. Pollock, former president and CEO of the Federal Home Loan Bank of Chicago; Senior Fellow James Wallner, who previously was group vice president for research for The Heritage Foundation;, James A. Baker, former FBI general counsel under James Comey, and Jillian Snider, professor at John Jay College of Criminal Justice in New York City and retired police officer.

=== Scholars and affiliates ===
R Street also maintains a network of fellows associated with the institute. These include Derek Khanna of Fenwick & West, former Milwaukee Mayor John Norquist, Lars Powell of the University of Alabama, Brad Rodu of the University of Louisville, Vincent Smith of Montana State University, Douglas Besharov of the University of Maryland School of Public Policy, and Andrew Hanson of Marquette University.

A legislative advisory board, made up of state legislators from around the country, helps to advise R Street leadership on state-level legislative issues. Its members include Sen. Joel Anderson (R-CA); Sen. Kevin Bacon (R-OH); Rep. Jason Isaac (R-TX); Sen. William Payne (R-NM); and Rep. Kim Koppelman (R-ND).

=== Board of directors ===
The R Street Institute's board of directors includes:

- Marni Soupcoff, chairwoman of the board
- Ryan Alexander, Taxpayers for Common Sense
- Ryan Calo, University of Washington School of Law
- Pablo Carrillo, Squire Patton Boggs
- Michael Cohen, Renaissance Reinsurance
- Bob Inglis, Energy and Enterprise Initiative
- Bob Watkins, State Farm Insurance
- Elizabeth Frazeee
- Amanda Nguyen, Rise
