= Mike Sussman (TV promotions writer/producer) =

Mike Sussman is an American writer, producer, and editor specializing in broadcast television promotions. He wrote and produced a series of five award-winning local promotional television spots for The Andy Griffith Show for WAXN-TV in Charlotte, North Carolina.

== Awards ==
- Two Emmy Awards from the National Academy of Television Arts and Sciences
- Promax Award from Promax/BDA
- National Addy Award from the American Advertising Federation
- Telly Award
