= Assessing Russian Activities and Intentions in Recent US Elections =

2017 US government report

- Copy of declassified report
- Author: Office of the Director of National Intelligence
- Language: English
- Subject: Russian interference in the 2016 United States elections
- Publication date: January 6, 2017
- Pages: 15 (declassified edition)

Assessing Russian Activities and Intentions in Recent US Elections (Note: Also abbreviated as Russian Activities and Intentions in Recent US Elections, Assessing Russian Activities and Intentions in Recent Elections or simply Assessing Russian Activities and Intentions) is a report issued by the United States Office of the Director of National Intelligence (ODNI) that assessed the extent and basis of Russia's interference in United States' elections in 2016. Published on January 6, 2017, the report includes an assessment by the National Security Agency, the Central Intelligence Agency, and the Federal Bureau of Investigation of the type and breadth of actions undertaken by Russia and affiliated elements during the elections. The report examines Russia's utilization of cyberspace such as hacking and the use of internet trolls and bots, and an intensive media campaign to influence public opinion in the United States. Additionally, it analyzes Russia's intentions and motivations in regards to their influence campaign. Issued in two forms, a classified version and a declassified version, the report drew its conclusions based on highly classified intelligence, an understanding of past Russian actions, and sensitive sources and methods.

== Background ==
Between 2015 and 2016, computer hackers affiliated with Russian intelligence breached the Democratic National Committee and began scoping its servers and lifting large amounts of data in the form of e-mails, donor lists, opposition research, etc. This information was published during the summer of 2016 by DCLeaks and WikiLeaks. In March 2016, John Podesta, the chairman of the Hillary Clinton campaign, was the target of a spear-phishing attack which stole more than 20,000 pages of e-mails that were subsequently dumped by WikiLeaks later in the fall of 2016.

On October 7, 2016, roughly one month before Election Day, the Department of Homeland Security in conjunction with the Office of the Director of National Intelligence (ODNI), the independent agency charged with overseeing and integrating the US Intelligence Community, released a statement expressing confidence that the Russian government was attempting to influence the upcoming election. The statement accused Russia of hacking and disseminating e-mails, and probing election databases, reading "We believe, based on the scope and sensitivity of these efforts, that only Russia's senior-most officials could have authorized these activities." One month after the election, on December 9, outgoing President Barack Obama directed intelligence agencies to conduct a "full review" of Russian influence operations on the US electoral process back to 2008. A preliminary Joint Analysis Report (JAR) was released by the DHS and FBI on December 29, which provided specific details on the type of cyber-tools and infrastructure utilized by Russian intelligence services in compromising and exploiting American systems.

== Contents ==
The version of Assessing Russian Activities and Intentions in Recent US Elections released for public consumption contained the same conclusions as the classified version, however, complete supporting information for the claims made in the public report was omitted due to its classified nature. The intelligence used was compiled by the Central Intelligence Agency (CIA), the Federal Bureau of Investigation (FBI), and the National Security Agency (NSA), and throughout the report confidence-levels by the agencies relating to specific claims were measured.

In the report, it is explicitly made known that the US Intelligence Community only analyzed and monitored the intentions, capabilities, and actions of the Russian government, and not what, if any, impact their influence campaign had on US public opinion or the US political process. Much of the content was focused on RT, the Kremlin-funded television network, and its role in attempting to manipulate US public opinion and discourse. The report was the most detailed public collection of Russian efforts to meddle in the 2016 elections released as of January 2017.

According to CNN, the CIA and FBI took Steele's dossier "seriously enough that they kept it out of" the January 6, 2017, assessment "in order to not divulge which parts of the dossier they had corroborated and how."

=== Russian actions in the 2016 election ===
- The Russian influence campaign was directly ordered by Vladimir Putin with the intention of promoting and increasing the electoral-chances of then-candidate Donald Trump while discrediting Hillary Clinton and increasing political and social discord in the United States. The CIA and FBI made this claim with "high confidence" while the NSA displayed "moderate confidence."
- The Main Intelligence Directorate (GRU), Russia's military intelligence service, used the Guccifer 2.0 persona to disseminate information gained from the compromise of Democratic National Committee (DNC) servers. This claim was made in "high confidence" by the agencies.
- Multiple state election databases were accessed and probed by Russian intelligence, however the Department of Homeland Security has confirmed the systems involved in vote tallying were not compromised.
- Putin had a personal preference for candidate-Trump due to his advocacy of Russia-friendly policies in Ukraine and Syria on the campaign trail, and his stated desire for a closer relationship with Moscow.
- Immediately after the election, Russian government officials halted their characterizations of the US election processes as unfair due to their belief that doing so would have hampered the possibility of warm relations with the incoming administration.
- The tactics used to meddle in the 2016 US election are the result of "years of investment" by Russia which has employed similar tactics in former Soviet republics, allowing them to sharpen their skills.
- Russian intelligence services gained entry into the servers of the Democratic National Committee as early as July 2015, and the GRU began cyber operations oriented at the US election as early as March 2016. In May, hackers "exfiltrated large volumes" of data from the DNC.
- Guccifer 2.0, DCLeaks, and WikiLeaks were used by Russia as intermediaries to publicly release "victim data" obtained from US targets. WikiLeaks was purportedly chosen by Moscow for this task due to its "self-proclaimed reputation for authenticity", though no data leaked to the organization contained "evident forgeries."
- RT (formerly Russia Today) actively collaborated with WikiLeaks. In 2013, the news agency's editor-in-chief visited the Ecuadorian embassy where Julian Assange resides to negotiate a possible contract renewal and RT routinely gave Assange "sympathetic coverage" and a "platform to denounce the United States."
- Russia gathered information on Republican political targets during the course of the election cycle but withheld that information from the public.
- Russian state media arms such as RT, Sputnik, and a web of Internet trolls consistently praised candidate-Trump while providing negative coverage of his opponent, Clinton. The media outlets targeted US domestic audiences using English language mediums to portray candidate-Trump in a positive light and disparage US media coverage of him as prejudiced and motivated by their commitment to the American political establishment.
- RT published a variety of anti-Clinton material throughout the election cycle intended to disparage Hillary Clinton. Among them were videos titled "How 100% of the Clintons' 'Charity' Went to…Themselves," and "Clinton and ISIS Funded by the Same Money."
- Before Election Day, Russian ultranationalist politician Vladimir Zhirinovsky proclaimed that Russia would "drink champagne" in the event of a Trump victory, due to the anticipation of Russia being able to move on its positions in Ukraine and Syria.
- One of the main propagators of Russian interference was the Saint Petersburg-based Internet Research Agency (IRA), a troll farm financed by a Putin ally with ties to Russian intelligence services. Some of the trolls at the IRA had previously been used to advocate online for pro-Russia causes in Ukraine.

=== RT-specific assessments ===
- RT America escalated its anti-US rhetoric in the lead-up to the 2012 presidential election, labeling the US's electoral system as "undemocratic" and encouraged Americans to revolt and "take this government back." During the 2012 election, RT ran a multitude of segments alleging voter machine vulnerabilities, widespread voter fraud, and aired two new shows which overtly criticized the United States and the Western institutions while promoting "radical content."
- In November 2012, RT ran a documentary about the Occupy Wall Street movement which characterized the movement as a struggle against the "ruling class" and reiterated calls for Americans to "take back" the government, claiming that the only method of changing the US government was through revolution.
- Anti-fracking has been a popular talking point for RT, likely an indicator of the Russian government's fear that an increase in fracking could lead to an expanded US natural gas market, threatening Russia's stake in the industry.
- During the 2008 Russo-Georgian War, RT claimed the Georgian government was killing civilians and orchestrating a genocide in South Ossetia

=== Russian government intentions in the 2016 election ===
The report affirmed that numerous past incidents had motivated the Russian government to wage an influence operation in support of Donald Trump's presidential campaign. Vladimir Putin believed that Russia was being demeaned on the international stage by a series of scandals he publicly attributed to the United States, such as the Olympic doping scandal and the Panama Papers. Putin sought to use the leaks of politically damaging material in the US as a method of tarnishing the image of the United States. In addition, Putin also held a personal vendetta against former-Secretary of State Hillary Clinton for what he saw as her personal hand in a series of protests in Russia from 2011 to 2012 as well as remarks by Clinton that Putin held were maligning. According to the report, when a Clinton victory appeared likely, Russia shifted its strategy from aiding Trump's candidacy to sabotaging Clinton's legitimacy, and questioning the trustworthiness of the election.

Notably, the Putin government also surmised that their actions would contribute to Russia's aim of threatening and eroding the "US-led liberal democratic order" which Russia views as a threat to its country and the regime.

== Release and reception ==
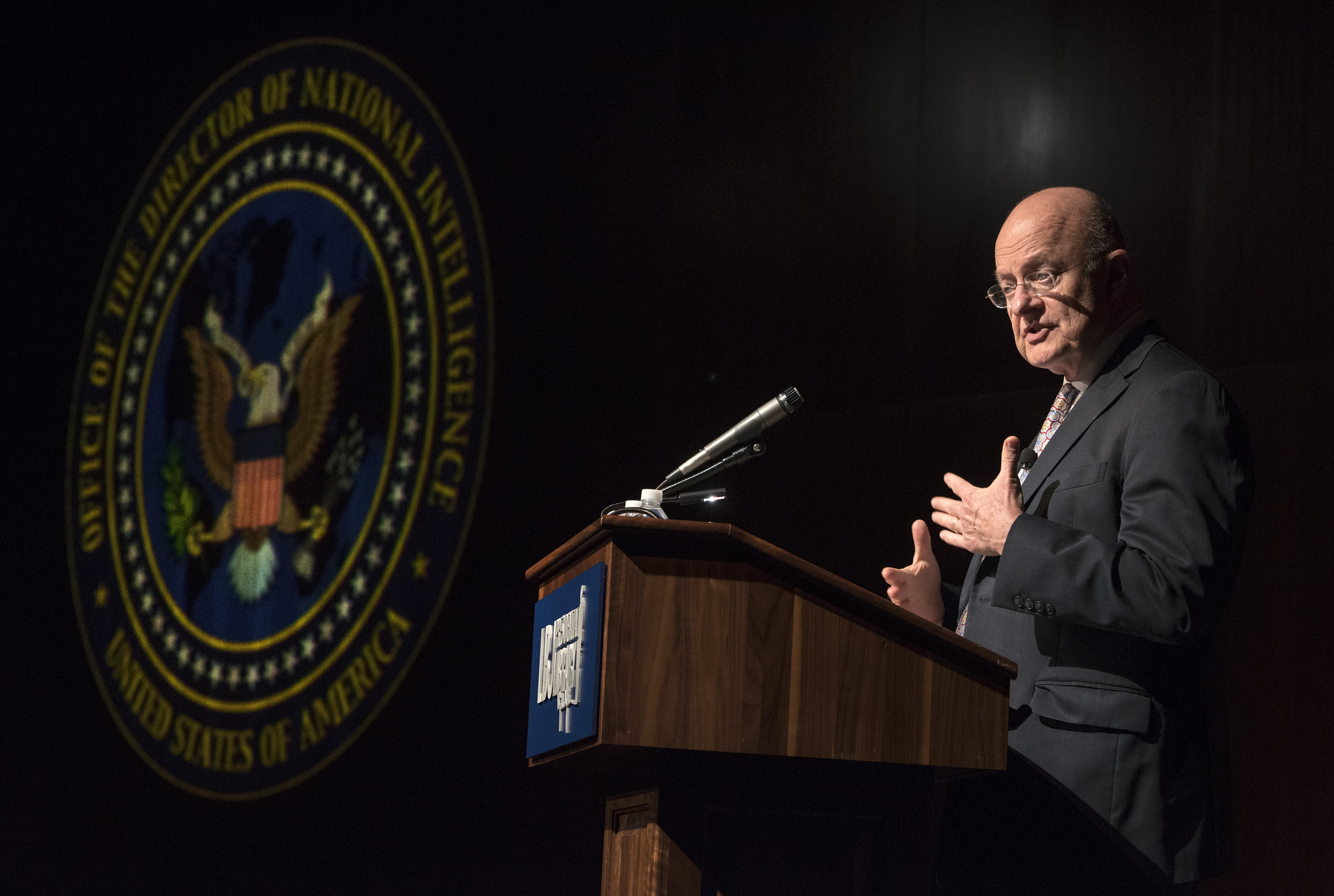
Director of National Intelligence James Clapper

On the afternoon of January 6, 2017, the ODNI published the declassified edition of the report titled Assessing Russian Activities and Intentions in Recent US Elections, less than one month after the Obama administration had requested a thorough review. Earlier in the day, FBI director James Comey, CIA director John Brennan, NSA director Mike Rogers, and Director of National Intelligence James Clapper briefed President-elect Donald Trump on the classified findings of the intelligence community during a meeting at Trump Tower, and then Comey privately briefed Trump about the most salacious allegations in the Steele dossier. On Tuesday, January 4, Trump tweeted that "the briefing was delayed until Friday", even though no briefing had been scheduled for Tuesday, and he insinuated that information was being withheld from him. After being briefed, Trump called the meeting "constructive" but Comey would later claim that Trump's reaction had disturbed him, compelling him to document the conversation in a memo. The next day, Trump issued a statement claiming "Intelligence stated very strongly there was absolutely no evidence that hacking affected the election results," which some have called a contradiction of the report's insistence that it had not undertaken an analysis of the effect of Russia's influence campaign on voters and public opinion. However, the report also indicates that Russian actions were limited to influence and propaganda, not the voting process itself.

Speaker of the House Paul Ryan acknowledged meddling but insisted that "We cannot allow partisans to exploit this report in an attempt to delegitimize the president-elect's victory." House Minority Leader and Gang of Eight member Nancy Pelosi called the report "really quite a stunning disclosure" and advocated for further declassification and congressional investigation. The Wall Street Journal accentuated the report's "surprisingly detailed findings" while The Washington Post'' called it a "remarkably blunt assessment."

An op-ed in The Moscow Times accused the report of containing blatant falsities and highlighted the fact that it had intentionally omitted supporting evidence and dedicated a large fraction of its content to scrutinizing RT.

Unclassified Summary of Initial Findings on 2017 Intelligence Community Assessment released by the Senate Select Committee on Intelligence

The Senate Intelligence Committee performed an in-depth review of the report and released its initial findings in July 2018. The committee found the report to be "a sound intelligence product."

== See also ==
- 2016 Democratic National Committee email leak
- Cyberwarfare by Russia
- Links between Trump associates and Russian officials
- Mueller special counsel investigation
- Podesta emails
