= John Durham =

American federal prosecutor (born 1950)

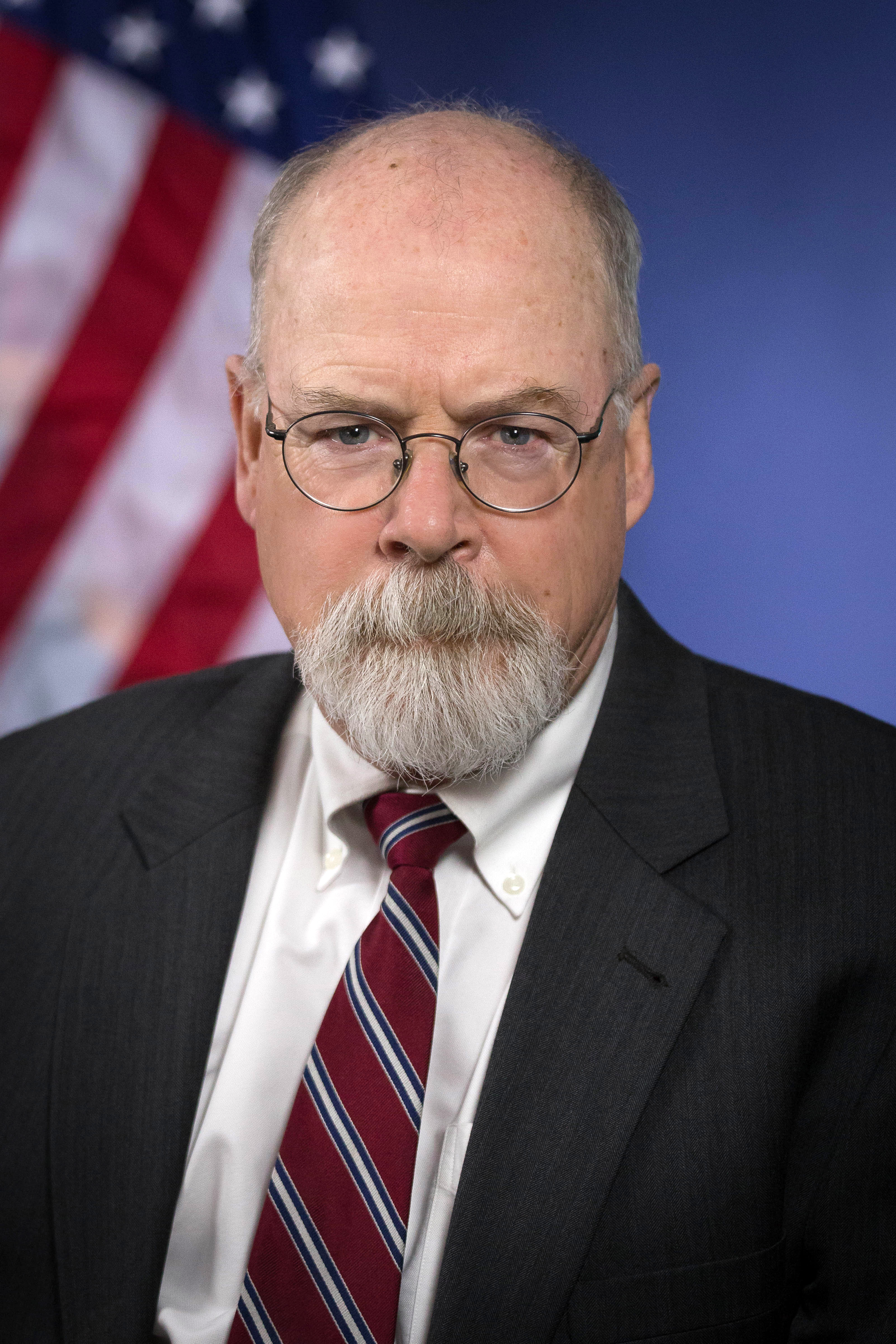

Special Counsel for the United States Department of Justice
- In office October 19, 2020 – May 15, 2023
- Appointed by: William Barr
- Preceded by: Position established
- Succeeded by: Position abolished

United States Attorney for the District of Connecticut
- In office October 28, 2017 – February 28, 2021; Acting until February 22, 2018
- President: Donald Trump; Joe Biden
- Preceded by: Deirdre M. Daly
- Succeeded by: Leonard C. Boyle (acting)
- Acting; January 20, 1997 – June 30, 1998
- President: Bill Clinton
- Preceded by: Christopher F. Droney
- Succeeded by: Stephen C. Robinson

Personal details
- Born: John Henry Durham; March 16, 1950 (age 76) Boston, Massachusetts, U.S.
- Party: Republican
- Education: Colgate University (BA); University of Connecticut (JD)
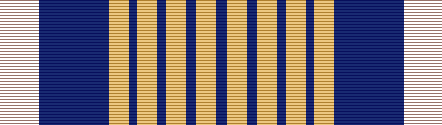
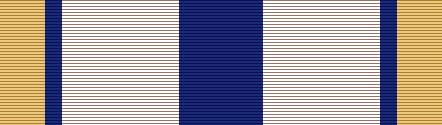
- Awards: Attorney General's Award for Exceptional Service Attorney General's Award for Distinguished Service

John Henry Durham (born March 16, 1950) is an American lawyer who served as the United States Attorney for the District of Connecticut from 2018 to 2021. He previously served as an assistant U.S. attorney in the District of Connecticut for 35 years, where he led investigations into public corruption, organized crime, and FBI misconduct.

Durham is known for several high-profile investigations. In the 1990s and 2000s, he investigated corrupt FBI agents who had protected Boston mobster Whitey Bulger and other organized crime figures, leading to the conviction of retired FBI agent John Connolly. In 2008, he was appointed special prosecutor to investigate the destruction of CIA interrogation tapes, ultimately declining to file charges. In 2014, he successfully prosecuted former Connecticut Governor John G. Rowland on federal corruption charges.

In April 2019, Attorney General William Barr assigned Durham to review the origins of the FBI's Crossfire Hurricane investigation into Russian interference in the 2016 U.S. elections. In October 2020, Barr appointed him special counsel, allowing the Durham special counsel investigation to continue after the Trump administration ended.

After three and a half years, Durham's investigation resulted in one conviction: FBI lawyer Kevin Clinesmith pleaded guilty to altering an email used in a FISA renewal application to surveil former Trump campaign adviser Carter Page and was sentenced to probation. Two other defendants, lawyer Michael Sussmann and analyst Igor Danchenko, were acquitted at trial.

Durham's May 2023 final report concluded the FBI opened a full investigation based on "raw, unanalyzed, and uncorroborated intelligence" when only a preliminary investigation was warranted, and that the bureau applied a different standard when evaluating concerns about the Clinton campaign.

== Early life and education ==
Durham was born in Boston, Massachusetts. He earned a Bachelor of Arts degree from Colgate University in 1972 and a Juris Doctor from the University of Connecticut School of Law in 1975. After graduation, he was a VISTA volunteer for two years (1975–1977) on the Crow Indian Reservation in Montana.

== Career ==
=== Connecticut state government ===
After Durham's volunteer work, he became a state prosecutor in Connecticut. From 1977 to 1978, he served as a Deputy Assistant State's Attorney in the Office of the Chief State's Attorney. From 1978 to 1982, Durham served as an Assistant State's Attorney in the New Haven State's Attorney's Office.

=== Federal government ===
Following those five years as a state prosecutor, Durham became a federal prosecutor, joining the U.S. Attorney's Office for the District of Connecticut. From 1982 to 1989, he served as an attorney and then supervisor in the New Haven Field Office of the Boston Strike Force in the Justice Department's Organized Crime and Racketeering Section. From 1989 to 1994, he served as Chief of the Office's Criminal Division. From 1994 to 2008, he served as the Deputy U.S. Attorney, and served as the U.S. Attorney in an acting and interim capacity in 1997 and 1998.

In December 2000, Durham revealed secret Federal Bureau of Investigation (FBI) documents that convinced a judge to vacate the 1968 murder convictions of Enrico Tameleo, Joseph Salvati, Peter J. Limone and Louis Greco because they had been framed by the agency. In 2007, the documents helped Salvati, Limone, and the families of the two other men, who had died in prison, win a $101.7 million civil judgment against the government.

In 2008, Durham led an inquiry into allegations that FBI agents and Boston Police had ties with the Mafia. He also led a series of high-profile prosecutions in Connecticut against the New England Mafia and corrupt politicians, including former Governor John G. Rowland.

From 2008 to 2012, Durham served as the acting U.S. Attorney for the Eastern District of Virginia.

On November 1, 2017, he was nominated by President Donald Trump to serve as U.S. Attorney for Connecticut. On February 16, 2018, his nomination was confirmed by voice vote of the Senate. He was sworn in on February 22, 2018.

In May 2019, William Barr chose Durham to lead a probe into the origins of the FBI's Crossfire Hurricane investigation and the Mueller special counsel investigation. On October 19, 2020, Barr appointed Durham Special Counsel to lead the Durham special counsel investigation in an effort to ensure the investigation continued after the Trump administration ended.

Durham resigned as U.S. Attorney effective February 28, 2021. He was one of 56 remaining Trump-appointed U.S. Attorneys President Joe Biden asked to resign in February 2021. He remained as Special Counsel until May 2023.

=== Appointments as Special Prosecutor ===
==== Whitey Bulger case ====
Amid allegations that FBI informants James "Whitey" Bulger and Stephen "The Rifleman" Flemmi had corrupted their handlers, US Attorney General Janet Reno named Durham special prosecutor in 1999. He oversaw a task force of FBI agents brought in from other offices to investigate the Boston office's handling of informants. In 2002, Durham helped secure the conviction of retired FBI agent John J. Connolly Jr., who was sentenced to 10 years in prison on federal racketeering charges for protecting Bulger and Flemmi from prosecution and warning Bulger to flee just before the gangster's 1995 indictment. Durham's task force also gathered evidence against retired FBI agent H. Paul Rico, who was indicted in Oklahoma on state charges that he helped Bulger and Flemmi kill a Tulsa businessman in 1981. Rico died in 2004 before the case went to trial.

==== CIA interrogation tapes destruction ====
In 2008, Durham was appointed by Attorney General Michael Mukasey to investigate the destruction of CIA videotapes of detainee interrogations. On November 8, 2010, Durham closed the investigation without recommending any criminal charges be filed. Durham's final report remains secret but was the subject of an unsuccessful lawsuit under the Freedom of Information Act filed by The New York Times reporter Charlie Savage.

==== Torture investigation ====
In August 2009, Attorney General Eric Holder appointed Durham to lead the Justice Department's investigation of the legality of CIA's use of so-called "enhanced interrogation techniques" in the torture of detainees. Durham's mandate was to look at only those interrogations that had gone "beyond the officially sanctioned guidelines", with Holder saying interrogators who had acted in "good faith" based on the guidance found in the Torture Memos issued by the Bush Justice Department were not to be prosecuted. Later in 2009, University of Toledo law professor Benjamin G. Davis attended a conference where former officials of the Bush administration had told conference participants shocking stories, and accounts of illegality on the part of more senior Bush officials. Davis wrote an appeal to former Bush administration officials to take their accounts of illegality directly to Durham. A criminal investigation into the deaths of two detainees, Gul Rahman in Afghanistan and Manadel al-Jamadi in Iraq, was opened in 2011. It was closed in 2012 with no charges filed.

=== Special counsel to review origins of Trump-Russia investigation ===
Beginning in 2017, Trump and his allies alleged that the FBI investigation (known as Crossfire Hurricane) of possible contacts between his associates and Russian officials (which led to the Mueller investigation) was a "hoax" or "witch hunt" initiated by his political enemies. In April 2019, Attorney General William Barr announced that he had launched a review of the origins of the FBI's investigation into Russian interference in the 2016 United States elections and it was reported in May that he had assigned Durham to lead it several weeks earlier. Durham was given the authority "to broadly examin[e] the government's collection of intelligence involving the Trump campaign's interactions with Russians," reviewing government documents and requesting voluntary witness statements. In September 2020, Barr reportedly had pressed the investigation to publish a report before the upcoming election, leading one of Durham's longtime aides to resign out of concern that he was doing so for political purposes. In December 2020, Barr revealed to Congress that he had appointed Durham to lead the Durham special counsel investigation on October 19. He stayed on in this capacity after he resigned as U.S. Attorney.

After a three-and-a-half-year investigation, Durham indicted three men. One of them, FBI lawyer Kevin Clinesmith, pleaded guilty to altering an email used in a FISA renewal application to surveil former Trump campaign adviser Carter Page; he was sentenced to probation. The other two, a Clinton campaign lawyer and a Russian-American analyst, were tried for lying to the FBI and acquitted.

On May 12, 2023, Durham submitted his final report to Barr's successor Merrick Garland. On May 15, 2023, Garland released the unclassified report "in full as submitted to me, without any additions, redactions, or other modifications”. The report concluded the FBI opened a full investigation based on "raw, unanalyzed, and uncorroborated intelligence" when only a preliminary investigation was warranted, and that the bureau applied a different standard when evaluating concerns about the Clinton campaign. Durham found senior FBI personnel displayed "a serious lack of analytical rigor toward the information that they received, especially information received from politically affiliated persons and entities."Reception to the report was divided along partisan lines, with critics calling it a rehash of known information and supporters arguing it confirmed systemic FBI failures.

== Awards and accolades ==
In 2011, Durham was included on The New Republic's list of Washington's most powerful, least famous people.

In 2004, Durham was decorated with the Attorney General's Award for Exceptional Service and, in 2012, with the Attorney General's Award for Distinguished Service.

== Personal life ==
Mr. Durham is a staunch Catholic. According to CNN, Durham is "press-shy" and is known for his tendency to avoid the media. United States Attorney Deirdre Daly once described him as "tireless, fair and aggressive" while United States Senator Chris Murphy characterized him as "tough-nosed ... apolitical and serious".

== See also ==
- Mueller report
- Timeline of Russian interference in the 2016 United States elections
- Timeline of investigations into Donald Trump and Russia (2019)
- Timeline of investigations into Donald Trump and Russia (2020–2021)
- Trump–Ukraine scandal
