= Michael Sussmann =

American lawyer (born 1964)

- Born: 1964 (age 61–62)
- Education: Rutgers University, Brooklyn Law School
- Occupations: Chair of the Privacy and Cybersecurity Practice at Fenwick & West

Michael A. Sussmann (born 1964) is the Chair of the Privacy and Cybersecurity Practice at Fenwick & West. He is a former federal prosecutor and former partner at the law firm Perkins Coie, where he focused on privacy and cybersecurity law. Sussmann represented the Democratic National Committee (DNC) and retained CrowdStrike to examine its servers after Russian hackers penetrated DNC networks during the 2016 U.S. elections.

In September 2016, Sussmann met with FBI General Counsel James Baker to present data alleging communications between Alfa-Bank servers and the Trump Organization. In 2021, Special Counsel John Durham indicted Sussmann for making a false statement, alleging he told Baker he was not acting on behalf of any client when he was representing the Hillary Clinton 2016 presidential campaign. Sussmann pleaded not guilty and was acquitted by a jury in May 2022.

== Early life and education ==
Sussmann grew up in New Jersey, and attended Rutgers University and then Brooklyn Law School.

== Professional career ==
Sussmann began his career as an associate at the law firm Proskauer Rose. He went on to work for twelve years as a prosecutor at the U.S. Justice Department, eventually specializing in computer crimes. He was a special assistant in the United States Department of Justice Criminal Division, and was later appointed as senior counsel. He worked as an assistant U.S. attorney for the Eastern District of Virginia, where he focused on white-collar and violent crime. He worked for Perkins Coie from 2005, where he was a partner in its privacy and cybersecurity practice, until his resignation in September 2021.

== Response to Russian cyber attacks on DNC ==
On April 28, 2016, DNC CEO Amy Dacy informed Sussmann of a data breach. Sussmann then contacted Shawn Henry, CSO and President of CrowdStrike Services. CrowdStrike discovered that two Russian hacker groups, working independently of each other, had penetrated DNC networks and stolen information, including opposition research on Trump. Other data security groups and U.S. intelligence confirmed these findings.

== Durham special counsel investigation ==
In September 2021, Special Counsel John Durham indicted Sussmann on one count of making a false statement to the FBI. The indictment alleged that during a September 2016 meeting with FBI General Counsel James Baker, Sussmann stated he was not acting on behalf of any client when he presented data alleging communications between computer servers at Alfa-Bank and the Trump Organization. Durham alleged Sussmann was in fact representing the Hillary Clinton 2016 presidential campaign.

The FBI investigated the Alfa-Bank allegations and found them to be without merit; they were not referenced in the Mueller Report.

In May 2022, Clinton's former campaign manager Robby Mook testified during the trial that Clinton had approved a plan to provide the Alfa-Bank allegations to the media.

Baker's recollection of the September 2016 meeting evolved during the investigation. In 2019 and 2020 interviews, Baker did not state that Sussmann had explicitly denied representing a client. Durham prosecutors said Baker later "affirmed and then re-affirmed his now-clear recollection" after reviewing contemporaneous notes. Sussmann's attorneys argued the evolving testimony undermined the indictment.

Sussmann pleaded not guilty. On May 31, 2022, a jury unanimously acquitted him after approximately six hours of deliberation. Following the acquittal, Sussmann stated he had "told the truth to the FBI" and the jury "clearly recognized that." His attorneys called the case "extraordinary prosecutorial overreach."

In May 2023, Durham released his final report, which concluded the FBI had used "raw, unanalyzed, and uncorroborated intelligence" to open its investigation into the Trump campaign and had applied a different standard than when evaluating concerns about the Clinton campaign.
