= Compromise (disambiguation) =

To compromise is to make a deal between different parties where each party gives up part of their demand.

Compromise, compromised, or compromising may also refer to:

== Arts, media, and entertainment ==
- Compromise (film), a 1925 American silent drama film
- Compromised (book), a 2020 American non-fiction book
- Compromised (film), a 1931 American drama film
- "Compromised" (FBI), a 2018 television episode
- "Compromised" (Legends of Tomorrow), a 2016 television episode

== Computing ==
- Compromising, in hacking computers or networks; see computer security
- Business email compromise, a cyber crime that uses email fraud to attack businesses and organizations

== Crime and espionage ==
- To be "compromised" means to be made vulnerable to coercion and blackmail by one's own embarrassing or illicit actions. See Kompromat.

== History ==
Various agreements, usually disambiguated by date, location, or topic, often referred to in context as "the compromise":

=== European Economic Community and European Union ===
- Ioannina compromise
- Luxembourg compromise

=== United States ===
- Compromise of 1790
- Compromise of 1850
- Compromise of 1877
- Atlanta Compromise
- Connecticut Compromise
- Crittenden Compromise
- Massachusetts Compromise
- Missouri Compromise
- Three-fifths Compromise
- Wheeler Compromise

=== Others ===
- Austro-Hungarian Compromise of 1867
- Compromise of Avranches (England)
- Compromise of Caspe (Kingdom of Aragon)
- Compromise of Nobles (Habsburg Netherlands)
- Compromise of Thorn (Polish–Teutonic War)
- Historic Compromise (Italy)
- Kotel compromise (Israel)

== Other uses ==
- Compromise agreement, a specific type of contract regulated by statute in the United Kingdom
- Compromise Township, Champaign County, Illinois, United States, a township

== See also ==
- No Compromise (disambiguation)
- Southern Compromise (disambiguation)
- The Great Compromise (disambiguation)
