= Horowitz report =

Horowitz report may refer to:

- The 2018 Inspector General report on FBI and DOJ actions in the 2016 election. (A Review of Various Actions by the Federal Bureau of Investigation and Department of Justice in Advance of the 2016 Election.) Published on June 14, 2018.
- The 2019 Inspector General report on the Crossfire Hurricane investigation. (Review of Four FISA Applications and Other Aspects of the FBI's Crossfire Hurricane Investigation.) Published on December 9, 2019.

== See also ==
- Michael E. Horowitz
