= Regime change =

Forced replacement of one government with another

Regime change is the partly forcible or coercive replacement of one government regime with another. It is typically understood as a violation of the sovereignty of the target state. Regime change may replace all or part of the state's most critical leadership system, administrative apparatus, or bureaucracy. Regime change may occur through domestic processes, such as revolution, coup, or reconstruction of government following state failure or civil war. It can also be imposed on a country by foreign actors through invasion, overt or covert interventions, or coercive diplomacy. Regime change may entail the construction of new institutions, the restoration of old institutions, and the promotion of new ideologies.

== Types ==
=== Internal regime change ===
Regime change can be precipitated by revolution or a coup d'état. For example, the French Revolution, the Russian Revolution, and the Iranian Revolution.

=== Foreign-imposed regime change ===
Commonly referred to as regime change wars, foreign-imposed regime change is the deposing of a regime by a foreign state, which can be achieved through covert means or by direct military action. Interstate war can also culminate into a foreign-imposed regime change for the losers, as occurred for the Axis powers during World War II (Nazi Germany, Fascist Italy, and the Empire of Japan). Foreign-imposed regime change is sometimes used by states as a foreign policy tool. According to a dataset by Alexander Downes, 120 leaders have been removed through foreign-imposed regime change between 1816 and 2011.

During the Cold War, the United States and the Soviet Union frequently intervened in elections and engaged in attempts at regime change, both covertly and overtly. According to Michael Poznansky, covert regime change became more common when non-intervention was codified into international law, leading states that wanted to engage in regime change to do so covertly and conceal their violations of international law.

21st century examples of regime-change include the United States invasion of Afghanistan and the 2003 invasion of Iraq, aswell as the 2026 United States intervention in Venezuela.

=== Regime promotion ===
According to John Owen IV, there are four historical waves of forcible regime promotion:

1. Catholicism vs Protestantism: From the 1520s to the early 18th century
2. Republicanism vs Constitutional monarchy vs Absolute monarchy: From the 1770s to the late 19th century
3. Communism vs Socialism vs Capitalism: post-1917
4. Islamism vs Secularism: post-1979

== Impact ==
Studies by Alexander Downes, Lindsey O'Rourke and Jonathan Monten indicate that foreign-imposed regime change seldom reduces the likelihood of civil war, violent removal of the newly imposed leader, and the probability of conflict between the intervening state and its adversaries, as well as does not increase the likelihood of democratization (unless regime change comes with pro-democratic institutional changes in countries with favorable conditions for democracy). Downes argues,

The strategic impulse to forcibly oust antagonistic or non-compliant regimes overlooks two key facts. First, the act of overthrowing a foreign government sometimes causes its military to disintegrate, sending thousands of armed men into the countryside where they often wage an insurgency against the intervener. Second, externally-imposed leaders face a domestic audience in addition to an external one, and the two typically want different things. These divergent preferences place imposed leaders in a quandary: taking actions that please one invariably alienates the other. Regime change thus drives a wedge between external patrons and their domestic protégés or between protégés and their people.

Research by Nigel Lo, Barry Hashimoto, and Dan Reiter has contrasting findings, as they find that interstate "peace following wars last longer when the war ends in foreign-imposed regime change." However, research by Reiter and Goran Peic finds that foreign-imposed regime change can raise the probability of civil war.

== By country ==
- Russian involvement in regime change
- Soviet involvement in regime change
- United States involvement in regime change
  - United States involvement in regime change in Latin America

== See also ==
- Active measures (in Soviet Union and Russia)
- Color revolution
- Covert operations
- Democracy promotion
- Export of revolution
- List of CIA controversies
- Peaceful transition of power
- Rollback
- State collapse
