= List of FBI controversies =

Since its founding in 1908 as the Bureau of Investigation, the Federal Bureau of Investigation (FBI) has been the subject of a number of controversial cases, both at home in the United States and abroad.

== Files on U.S. citizens ==
The FBI has maintained files on numerous people, including celebrities such as Elvis Presley, Frank Sinatra, John Denver, John Lennon, Jane Fonda, Groucho Marx, Charlie Chaplin, the band MC5, Lou Costello, Sonny Bono, Bob Dylan, Michael Jackson, and Mickey Mantle. The reason for the existence of the files varied. Some of the subjects were investigated for alleged ties to the Communist party (Charlie Chaplin and Groucho Marx), or in connection with antiwar activities during the Vietnam War (John Denver, John Lennon, and Jane Fonda). Numerous celebrity files concern threats or extortion attempts against them (Sonny Bono, John Denver, John Lennon, Elvis Presley, Michael Jackson, Mickey Mantle, Groucho Marx, and Frank Sinatra).

== Domestic surveillance ==
A 1985 wiretapping and civil liberties report by the U.S. Congress found that the FBI had "installed over 7,000 national security surveillances," including many on American citizens, from 1940 to 1960.

== Child pornography distribution and Operation Pacifier ==
The FBI has been called "the largest distributor of child pornography," at one point operating more than half of the child porn websites on the Dark web. Most prominently, following the arrest of the administrator of Playpen, a child pornography website, the FBI moved Playpen's server to an FBI warehouse in Virginia where it commenced Operation Pacifier. The stated objective of Operation Pacifier was to run the child pornography website to conduct sting operations on those who visited the website. For two weeks, 48,000 photos, 200 videos, and 13,000 child porn links were distributed by the FBI, available to be downloaded, viewed, and reproduced. During that timeframe, the website received 100,000 views. As a result of the FBI running the site, the site operated faster and was more accessible, increasing the traffic of the site to 50,000 visitors per week, up from 11,000 before the government takeover.

Regarding Operation Pacifier, one critic noted, "The government has criminalized an activity and acted to further the commission of just that crime" and other critics called for the FBI agents responsible to face prison time. The FBI has declined to comment on or justify Operation Pacifier. Playpen was not the only child pornography website the FBI operated. In 2016, the FBI ran 24 of the estimated 29 Tor-hidden child pornography websites. Several FBI agents have also been criminally charged with personal possession and production of child porn.

== Covert operations on political groups ==
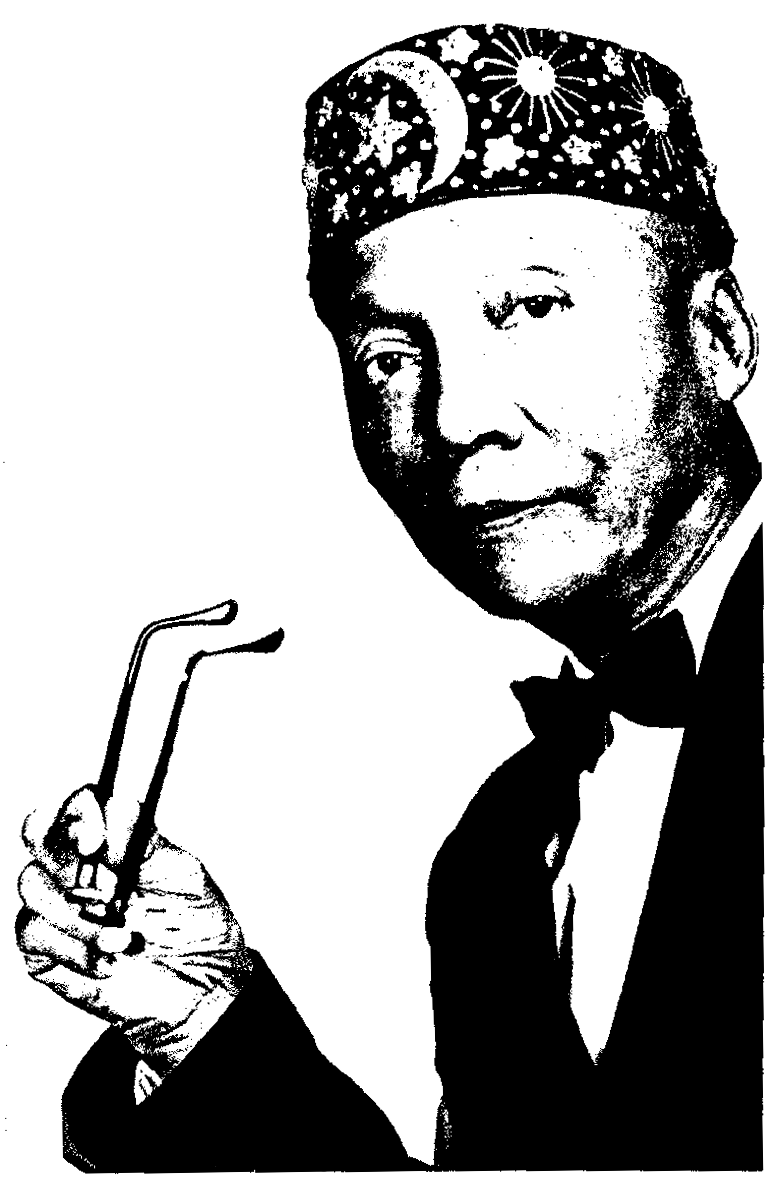
Image from the FBI monograph of the Nation of Islam (1965): Elijah Muhammad

COINTELPRO tactics have been alleged to include discrediting targets through psychological warfare, smearing individuals and/or groups using forged documents and by planting false reports in the media, harassment, wrongful imprisonment, and illegal violence, including assassination. The FBI's stated motivation was "protecting national security, preventing violence, and maintaining the existing social and political order."

FBI records show that 85 percent of COINTELPRO resources targeted groups and individuals that the FBI deemed "subversive", including communist and socialist organizations; organizations and individuals associated with the civil rights movement, including Martin Luther King Jr. and others associated with the Southern Christian Leadership Conference, the National Association for the Advancement of Colored People, and the Congress of Racial Equality and other civil rights organizations; black nationalist groups (e.g., Nation of Islam and the Black Panther Party); the American Indian Movement; a broad range of organizations labeled "New Left", including Students for a Democratic Society and the Weathermen; almost all groups protesting the Vietnam War, as well as individual student demonstrators with no group affiliation; the National Lawyers Guild; organizations and individuals associated with the women's rights movement; nationalist groups such as those seeking independence for Puerto Rico, United Ireland, and Cuban exile movements including Orlando Bosch's Cuban Power and the Cuban Nationalist Movement. The remaining 15% of COINTELPRO resources were expended to marginalize and subvert white hate groups, including the Ku Klux Klan and the National States' Rights Party.

== Files on Puerto Rican independence advocates ==
The FBI also spied upon and collected information on Puerto Rican independence leader Pedro Albizu Campos and his Nationalist political party in the 1930s. Albizu Campos was convicted three times in connection with deadly attacks on US government officials: in 1937 (Conspiracy to overthrow the government of the United States), in 1950 (attempted murder), and in 1954 (after an armed assault on the US House of Representatives while in session; although not present, Albizu Campos was considered the mastermind). The FBI operation was covert and did not become known until U.S. Congressman Luis Gutierrez had it made public via the Freedom of Information Act in the 1980s.

In the 2000s, researchers obtained files released by the FBI under the Freedom of Information Act revealing that the San Juan FBI office had coordinated with FBI offices in New York, Chicago and other cities, in a decades-long surveillance of Albizu Campos and Puerto Ricans who had contact or communication with him. The documents available are as recent as 1965.

== Activities in Latin America ==
From the 1950s to the 1980s, the governments of many Latin American and Caribbean countries, including Argentina, Brazil, Chile, Cuba, Mexico and others were infiltrated by the FBI. These operations began in World War II as 700 agents were assigned to monitor Nazi activity, but soon expanded to monitoring communist activity in places like Ecuador.

== Viola Liuzzo ==
In one particularly controversial 1965 incident, white civil rights worker Viola Liuzzo was murdered by Ku Klux Klansmen, who gave chase and fired shots into her car after noticing that her passenger was a young black man; one of the Klansmen was Gary Thomas Rowe, an acknowledged FBI informant. The FBI spread rumors that Liuzzo was a member of the Communist Party and a heroin addict and had abandoned her children to have sexual relationships with African Americans involved in the civil rights movement. FBI records show that J. Edgar Hoover personally communicated these insinuations to President Johnson.

== Waco siege ==
The Waco siege in 1993 was a failed raid by the ATF that resulted in the deaths of four ATF agents and six Branch Davidians. The FBI and US military became involved with the 51-day siege that followed. The building housing the Davidians was burnt down, killing 76 of them, including 26 children. Timothy McVeigh was reportedly motivated by the outcome of this siege, along with Ruby Ridge incident, to carry out the Oklahoma City bombing in 1995.

== Ruby Ridge ==
The Ruby Ridge siege in 1992 was a shootout between the FBI and Randy Weaver over his failure to appear in court on weapons charges. Weaver's wife and son were killed by FBI gunmen in the incident. A US Marshal was shot in what was ruled reasonable self-defense. The US Government paid over 3 million dollars in an out-of-court settlement and $380,000 court awarded settlement.

== 1996 campaign finance controversy ==
The U.S. Department of Justice investigation into the fund-raising activities had uncovered evidence that Chinese agents sought to direct contributions from foreign sources to the Democratic National Committee (DNC) before the 1996 presidential campaign. The Chinese embassy in Washington, D.C. was used for coordinating contributions to the DNC.

In addition to partisan complaints from Republicans, a number of FBI agents suggested the investigations into the fund-raising controversies were willfully impeded. FBI agent Ivian Smith wrote a letter to FBI Director Louis Freeh that expressed "a lack of confidence" in the Justice Department's attorneys regarding the fund-raising investigation. FBI agent Daniel Wehr told Congress that the first head U.S. attorney in the investigation, Laura Ingersoll, told the agents they should "not pursue any matter related to solicitation of funds for access to the president. The reason given was, 'That's the way the American political process works.' I was scandalized by that," Wehr said. The four FBI agents also said that Ingersoll prevented them from executing search warrants to stop destruction of evidence and micromanaged the case beyond all reason.

FBI agents were also denied the opportunity to ask President Bill Clinton and Vice President Al Gore questions during Justice Department interviews in 1997 and 1998 and were only allowed to take notes.

== Internal investigations of shootings ==
During the period from 1993 to 2011, FBI agents fired their weapons on 289 occasions; FBI internal reviews found the shots justified in all but 5 cases, in none of the 5 cases were people wounded. Samuel Walker, a professor of criminal justice at the University of Nebraska Omaha said the number of shots found to be unjustified was "suspiciously low." In the same time period, the FBI wounded 150 people, 70 of whom died; the FBI found all 150 shootings to be justified. Likewise, during the period from 2011 to the present, all shootings by FBI agents have been found to be justified by internal investigation. In a 2002 case in Maryland, an innocent man was shot, and later paid $1.3 million by the FBI after agents mistook him for a bank robber; the internal investigation found that the shooting was justified, based on the man's actions.

== The Whitey Bulger case ==
The FBI has been criticized for its handling of Boston organized crime figure Whitey Bulger. Beginning in 1975, Bulger served as an informant for the FBI. As a result, the Bureau largely ignored his organization in exchange for information about the inner workings of the Italian American Patriarca crime family.

In December 1994, after being tipped off by his former FBI handler about a pending indictment under the Racketeer Influenced and Corrupt Organizations Act, Bulger fled Boston and went into hiding. For 16 years, he remained at large. For 12 of those years, Bulger was prominently listed on the FBI Ten Most Wanted Fugitives list. Beginning in 1997, the New England media exposed criminal actions by federal, state, and local law enforcement officials tied to Bulger. The revelation caused great embarrassment to the FBI. In 2002, Special Agent John J Connolly was convicted of federal racketeering charges for helping Bulger avoid arrest. In 2008, Special Agent Connolly completed his term on the federal charges and was transferred to Florida where he was convicted of helping plan the murder of John B Callahan, a Bulger rival. In 2014, that conviction was overturned on a technicality. Connolly was the agent leading the investigation of Bulger.

In June 2011, the 81-year-old Bulger was arrested in Santa Monica, California. Bulger was tried on 32 counts of racketeering, money laundering, extortion, and weapons charges; including complicity in 19 murders. In August 2013, the jury found him guilty on 31 counts, and having been involved in 11 murders. Bulger was sentenced to two consecutive life terms plus five years.

== Robert Hanssen ==
On February 20, 2001, the bureau announced that a special agent, Robert Hanssen (born 1944) had been arrested for spying for the Soviet Union and then Russia from 1979 to 2001. He was serving 15 consecutive life sentences without the possibility of parole at ADX Florence, a federal supermax prison near Florence, Colorado until his death on June 5, 2023. Hanssen was arrested on February 18, 2001, at Foxstone Park near his home in Vienna, Virginia, and was charged with selling US secrets to the USSR and subsequently Russia for more than US$1.4 million in cash and diamonds over a 22-year period. On July 6, 2001, he pleaded guilty to 15 counts of espionage in the United States District Court for the Eastern District of Virginia. His spying activities have been described by the US Department of Justice's Commission for the Review of FBI Security Programs as "possibly the worst intelligence disaster in U.S. history".

== Killing of Filiberto Ojeda Rios ==
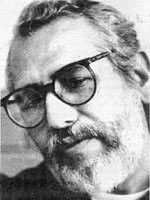
Puerto Rican Nationalist leader Filiberto Ojeda Ríos died in a gun battle with FBI agents in 2005.

In 2005, fugitive Puerto Rican Nationalist leader Filiberto Ojeda Ríos died in a gun battle with FBI agents that some believe was an assassination. Puerto Rico Governor Aníbal Acevedo Vilá criticized the FBI assault as "improper" and "highly irregular" and demanded to know why his government was not informed of it. The FBI refused to release information beyond the official press release, citing security and agent privacy issues. The Puerto Rico Justice Department filed suit in federal court against the FBI and the US Attorney General, demanding information crucial to the Commonwealth's own investigation of the incident. The case was dismissed by the U.S. Supreme Court. Ojeda Rios' funeral was attended by a long list of dignitaries, including the highest authority of the Roman Catholic Church in Puerto Rico, Archbishop Roberto Octavio González Nieves, ex-Governor Rafael Hernández Colón, and numerous other personalities.

In the aftermath of his death, the United Nations Special Committee on Decolonization approved a draft resolution urging a "probe of [the] pro-independence killing, human rights abuses", after "Petitioner after petitioner condemned the assassination of Mr. Ojeda Rios by agents of the Federal Bureau of Investigation (FBI)".

== Associated Press impersonation case ==
In 2007, an agent working in Seattle, Washington for the FBI impersonated an Associated Press (AP) journalist and unwittingly infected the computer of a 15-year old suspect with a malicious surveillance software. The incident sparked a strongly-worded statement from the AP demanding the bureau refrain from ever impersonating a member of the news media again. Moreover, in September 2016 the incident resulted in a condemnation by the Justice Department.

In December 2017, following a US court appearance, a judge ruled in favor of the AP in a lawsuit against the FBI for fraudulently impersonating a member of the news media.

== Wikipedia edits ==
In August 2007, Virgil Griffith, a Caltech computation and neural-systems graduate student, created WikiScanner, a searchable database that linked changes made by anonymous Wikipedia editors to companies and organizations from which the changes were made. The database cross-referenced logs of Wikipedia edits with publicly available records pertaining to the Internet IP addresses edits were made from. Griffith was motivated by the edits from the United States Congress, and wanted to see if others were similarly promoting themselves. The tool was designed to detect conflict of interest edits. Among his findings were that FBI computers were used to edit the FBI article on Wikipedia. Although the edits correlated with known FBI IP addresses, there was no evidence that the changes actually came from a member or employee of the FBI, only that someone who had access to their network had edited the FBI article on Wikipedia. Wikipedia spokespersons received Griffith's "WikiScanner" positively, noting that it helped prevent conflicts of interest from influencing articles as well as increasing transparency and mitigating attempts to remove or distort relevant facts.

== Ibragim Todashev custodial death ==
After the Boston Marathon Bombings in 2013, Ibragim Todashev was killed by the FBI during an interrogation. Todashev was an associate of Tamerlan Tsarnaev, the mastermind of the two bombers who was killed by the Boston police.

== Florida school shooting ==
On February 16, 2018, two days after the Stoneman Douglas High School shooting, the FBI released a statement detailing information the organization's Public Access Line had received a month prior, on January 5, from a person close to Nikolas Cruz, the suspected shooter. According to the statement, "The caller provided information about Cruz's gun ownership, desire to kill people, erratic behavior, and disturbing social media posts, as well as the potential of him conducting a school shooting." After conducting an investigation, the FBI reported that it had not followed protocol when the tip was not forwarded to the Miami Field Office, where further investigative steps would have been taken to prevent the mass killing.

== Hillary Clinton email investigation ==
On July 5, 2016, then-FBI Director James Comey announced the bureau's recommendation that the United States Department of Justice file no criminal charges relating to the Hillary Clinton email controversy. During an unusual 15 minute press conference in the J. Edgar Hoover Building, Comey called Secretary Clinton's and her top aides' behavior "extremely careless", but concluded that "no reasonable prosecutor would bring such a case".

On October 28, 2016, less than two weeks before the presidential election, Director Comey, a long-time Republican, announced in a letter to Congress that additional emails potentially related to the Clinton email controversy had been found and that the FBI will investigate "to determine whether they contain classified information as well as to assess their importance to our investigation." At the time Comey sent his letter to Congress, the FBI had still not obtained a warrant to review any of the e-mails in question and was not aware of the content of any of the e-mails in question. After Comey's letter to Congress, commentator Paul Callan of CNN and Niall O'Dowd of Irish Central compared Comey to J. Edgar Hoover in attempting to influence and manipulate elections. On November 6, 2016, in the face of constant pressure from both Republicans and Democrats, Comey conceded in a second letter to Congress that through the FBI's review of the new e-mails, there was no wrongdoing by Clinton.

On November 12, 2016, former Democratic presidential candidate Hillary Clinton directly attributed her election loss to Comey.

=== DOJ Watchdog Report ===
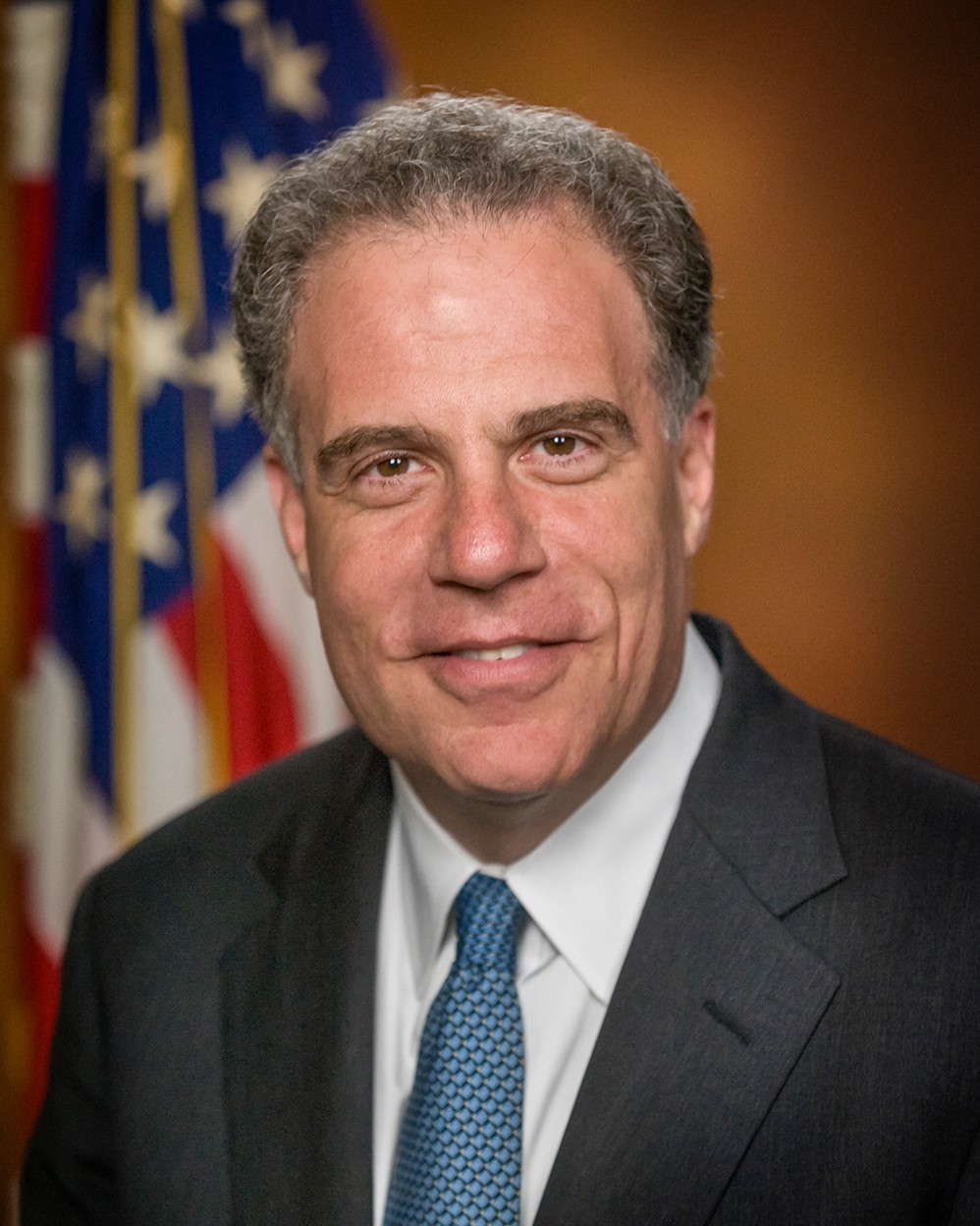
DOJ Inspector General Michael E. Horowitz.

On June 14, 2018, Michael E. Horowitz, the Inspector General of the Department of Justice, released a report of a year-long investigation into misconduct at the DOJ and FBI over its probe of Hillary Clinton's private email server. Horowitz faulted James Comey, FBI Director at the time of the email server investigation, for deviating from bureau and Justice Department protocol, which damaged the agencies’ image of impartiality, according to the watchdog report.

Comey was also faulted for a 'troubling lack of direct or substantive communication' with Attorney General Loretta Lynch ahead of his July 5, 2016 press conference on Clinton's email probe and his subsequent letter to Congress in October 2016. The report read: "We found it extraordinary that, in advance of two such consequential decisions, the FBI director decided that the best course of conduct was to not speak directly and substantively with the attorney general about how best to navigate those decisions."

Moreover, it was determined, according to an internal FBI email and a memo from two GOP-led House committees, that foreign actors may had obtained access to Clinton's emails, including at least one email classified as "secret." The memo did not specify who the foreign actors involved were nor the content of the emails.

The watchdog probe found no evidence of political bias or criminal misconduct in Comey's decisions throughout the entire email server investigation. "We found no evidence that the conclusions by department prosecutors were affected by bias or other improper considerations," the report stated. Shortly after the release of the report, FBI Director Christopher Wray held a news briefing in Washington where he defended the bureau's integrity over the report's highly-critical findings, but vowed to hold agents accountable for any misconduct and said the FBI will make its employees undergo bias training.

Former Secretary of State Clinton, President Trump, lawmakers, and academics have commented on the report's findings, denouncing Comey and his breach of bureau norms, and five FBI employees that exchanged questionable text messages leading up to the 2016 US election. All five employees, which include former counter-intelligence agent Peter Strzok, were referred by Horowitz for a separate investigation.

== James Comey dismissal, IG probe ==
=== Dismissal of Comey ===
On May 9, 2017, President Trump dismissed FBI director Comey after Comey had misstated several key findings of the email investigation in his testimony to the Senate Judiciary Committee. Many mainstream news outlets had questioned whether the dismissal was in response to Comey's request for more resources to expand the probe into Russian interference into the Presidential election. Following Comey's dismissal, Deputy Director Andrew G. McCabe became acting director. On August 1, 2017, President Trump's nominee for FBI director Christopher A. Wray was officially confirmed by the Senate in a 92–5 vote and was sworn in as Director the next day.

=== Horowitz's Findings ===
The inspector general of the Department of Justice, Michael E. Horowitz, publicized a report into misconduct at the DOJ and FBI over its handling of the Hillary Clinton private email server investigation. Horowitz criticized James Comey, FBI director at the time of the investigation, for not following bureau and Justice Department protocol. The IG report, however, did not find any evidence of political bias or criminal misconduct in Comey's decisions throughout the email server investigation.

According to the report, Horowitz found that Comey had a 'troubling lack of direct or substantive communication' with Attorney General Loretta Lynch ahead of his July 5, 2016 press conference on Clinton's email probe and his letter to Congress in October 2016. "We found it extraordinary that, in advance of two such consequential decisions, the FBI director decided that the best course of conduct was to not speak directly and substantively with the attorney general about how best to navigate those decisions," according to the IG findings.

Moreover, the report also uncovered the use of a private Gmail account for FBI business utilized by Comey, despite warning employees about its usage. The act of misconduct was "inconsistent with" Justice Department policy, the watchdog investigation determined.

=== The Nunes memo, FISA warrant ===
On February 2, 2018, a four-page confidential memo by Republican House Intelligence Committee chairman Devin Nunes was released after being signed by President Trump. According to the memo, a dossier by Christopher Steele and opposition research firm Fusion GPS was utilized by DOJ and FBI officials like E. W. Priestap for FISA warrants to surveil Trump's campaign member Carter Page. Additionally, former FBI Deputy Director Andrew McCabe, who resigned before the release of the memo, stated that the FISA warrant wouldn't have been obtained without the information in the Steele dossier. All four FISA applications were signed by McCabe, Rod Rosenstein, and former FBI Director James Comey. President Trump commented on the release of the memo, saying: "A lot of people should be ashamed."

=== Andrew McCabe dismissal and investigation ===
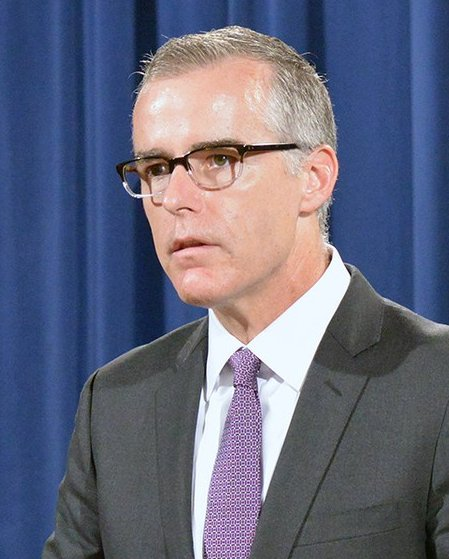
Former Deputy FBI Director Andrew G. McCabe.

On March 16, 2018, Attorney General Jeff Sessions fired Andrew McCabe, former FBI deputy director, for allowing FBI officials to leak information to the media surrounding the Clinton Foundation investigation and then misleading investigators about the incident. The FBI's Office of Professional Responsibility recommended the firing two days prior. The allegations of misconduct were the result of an investigation by Michael E. Horowitz, the Inspector General specific to the DOJ appointed by former US President Barack Obama, who announced in January 2017 that the DOJ would be probing the FBI's actions leading up to the 2016 US election.

On March 21, 2018, FBI Director Christopher Wray said the firing of McCabe was done "by the book" and was not politically motivated. On June 12, 2018, a lawyer representing McCabe sued the Department of Justice and the FBI pertaining to his firing.

On September 6, 2018, it was disclosed to the media that a grand jury had begun investigating McCabe and summoning witnesses to determine if criminal charges should be filed for having misled the bureau. The probe is currently being handled by the U.S. attorney's office in D.C. McCabe was never charged with criminal wrongdoing, and on October 14, 2021, the Justice Department reversed his firing, settling the lawsuit he had filed asserting he was dismissed for political reasons. The government agreed to "rescind and vacate" McCabe's removal and correct its records to reflect that McCabe retired in good standing on March 19, 2018, as deputy director, and to pay his pension as well as $200,000 in missed pension payments. The government also agreed to pay more than $500,000 in legal fees McCabe had incurred and expunge any record of his being fired from FBI personnel records. On October 27, 2021, Attorney General Merrick Garland testified about McCabe's lawsuit at an oversight hearing before the Senate Judiciary Committee, stating that the DOJ lawyers defending the case "concluded that they needed to settle the case because of a likelihood of loss on the merits."

==== OIG Investigation ====
On April 13, 2018, a section regarding McCabe from the Department of Justice watchdog report was released to the public. According to the report, McCabe "lacked candor," including under oath, and authorized disclosures to the media in violation of FBI policy during a federal investigation into the Clinton Foundation. On April 19, 2018, the Justice Department inspector general had referred the findings of McCabe's misconduct to the U.S. Attorney's Office in Washington, D.C. for possible criminal charges, according to media reports. McCabe has denied the accusations of misconduct.

==== Allegations of sexual discrimination ====
In late-2017, during an interview with Circa, former FBI Supervisory special agent Jeffrey Danik spoke out against McCabe and the bureau over his handling of cases surrounding sexual discrimination, Hatch Act Violations, and Hillary Clinton's email server. Around the same period of time, another former Supervisory Special Agent, Robyn Gritz, one of the bureau's top intelligence analysts and terrorism experts, filed a sexual discrimination complaint against the bureau. Gritz came forward with allegations of harassment by McCabe, who she said created a “cancer-like” bureaucracy striking fear in female agents, causing others to resign, and "poisoning the 7th floor," where management is housed in the FBI's Hoover Building. In an additional case, where a federal lawsuit was filed, another agent came forward with allegations of harassment and misogynistic behavior against women in particular, describing an increasing problem of sexism at the bureau.

=== Peter Strzok's dismissal ===
On August 10, 2018, Peter Strzok, a former counter-intelligence agent reassigned to the FBI's Human Resources department, was fired by the Bureau amid tensions over his role in exchanging questionable text messages with another FBI employee, Lisa Page, with whom he was engaged in an extramarital affair. An attorney representing Strzok criticized the Bureau's actions, calling it "a departure from typical Bureau practice" and noting that it also "contradicts Director Wray's testimony to Congress and his assurances that the FBI intended to follow its regular process in this and all personal matters."

The firing came within months of an incident where Strzok was escorted out of an FBI building and also the release of an OIG report by the Department of Justice's inspector general Michael E. Horowitz. Several employees, including Strzok, were referred for a separate investigation by Horowitz for possible misconduct during the Clinton email probe. President Trump praised the Bureau's dismissal, tweeting the following: “Agent Peter Strzok was just fired from the FBI ― finally. The list of bad players in the FBI & DOJ gets longer & longer.”

Strzok and Page each sued the Justice Department in 2019. Their lawsuits were consolidated. In May 2024, they reached a tentative settlement with the Justice Department. On July 26, 2024 it was revealed that Strzok will receive $1.2 million and Lisa Page will receive $800,000.

=== Use of DMV photos for facial recognition ===
In 2019, the Washington Post acknowledged that released documents show that agents of the FBI and ICE Immigration and Customs Enforcement were using DMV state driver's license photos for facial-recognition searches.

=== Arctic Frost investigation ===
In 2022–2023, Special Counsel Jack Smith's office issued 197 subpoenas to telecommunications and financial institutions seeking records on over 430 Republican officials, donors, and organizations as part of investigations related to Donald Trump and the January 6 Capitol attack. Congressional investigations revealed the subpoenas targeted sitting members of Congress, state officials, and political donors. The investigation prompted debate over separation of powers and the scope of prosecutorial authority.

=== FBI Richmond Catholic memo ===
In January 2023, the FBI Richmond Field Office produced an internal memo identifying "radical traditionalist Catholics" as potential domestic violent extremists, relying on Southern Poverty Law Center designations of Catholic organizations as "hate groups." The memo proposed developing sources within Catholic parishes. After the memo leaked, the FBI retracted it, Attorney General Merrick Garland called it "appalling," and 20 state attorneys general demanded an investigation. A congressional inquiry found multiple field offices were involved and that the memo's authors knew their sources had political bias.

=== Charles McGonigal indictment ===
In January 2023, a retired senior FBI official and former agent in charge of the F.B.I.’s counterintelligence division in New York, Charles McGonigal, was charged with falsifying FBI reports, money laundering, conspiracy, and violating sanctions by working for Oleg Deripaska, a Russian aluminum manufacturer and oligarch.

== FBI surveillance since 2010 ==
Defending Rights & Dissent, a civil liberties group, cataloged known instances of First Amendment abuses and political surveillance by the FBI since 2010. The organization found that the FBI devoted disproportionate resources to spy on left-leaning civil society groups, including Occupy Wall Street, economic justice advocates, racial justice movements, environmentalists, Abolish ICE, and various anti-war movements. In late 2020, the ACLU filed a lawsuit demanding information about the FBI's Electronic Device Analysis Unit. The civil rights group believes that the EDAU has been quietly breaking into iPhones and other devices.

In 2020, the FBI and Customs and Border Protection have used drones for surveillance of protests by the Black Lives Matter movement. In 2020, the FBI paid an informant to pose as organizer in Denver, Colorado during the George Floyd protests. This informant particularly infiltrated and undermined protest movements by accusing other genuine activists of being FBI informants.

In 2023, the FBI admitted for the first time that it bought location data rather than obtain a warrant.

During the 2026 Delaney Hall protests, FBI agents contacted protesters who had been arrested in an attempt to gather information about protesters. The FBI also contacted the families and friends of arrested protesters, and FBI agents performed knock and talks at protester homes. The Intercept characterized this as the FBI trying to "flip" protesters into informants, and public defenders representing the arrestees argued this violated the protesters' rights to legal representation.

== The Crypto Six ==
In March 2021 in Keene, New Hampshire, the FBI led a raid, along with the ATF and other agencies, on the Free Talk Live studios (a libertarian radio show) against Ian Freeman (director of FTL) alleging that he operated an unlicensed money transmitting business in the form of Bitcoin ATM machines. The raid was conducted in the middle of the night and the joint taskforce used Bearcat armored vehicles, flashbang grenades, and destroyed security cameras and windows on Freeman's property. The taskforce also confiscated $180,000 in cash, boxes full of goldbacks, 101 physical Bitcoins, and other possessions of Ian Freeman. The homes of several other individuals were raided that night, later being referred to as "the Crypto Six." While the FBI's main justification for this raid was that scammers were using the Bitcoin vending machines to scam people, Ian Freeman counters saying that he frequently warned ATM users of scams and used his Bitcoin vending machines to improve the businesses in his community.

The prosecution had originally charged Freeman with 25 felony counts, eventually dropping 17 counts as the trial went on. Freeman's attorney asserted that the charges against Freeman were "absolute nonsense" and described Freeman as a nonviolent man that assists people with avoiding scams rather than aiding scams. Freeman received public support during his trial, with overflow rooms established to accommodate his supporters and one security officer noting, "I’ve never seen the courtroom like that" when referencing the number of attendees. On December 23, 2022, Ian Freeman was convicted on all eight felony counts and his case is pending sentencing and appeal. His appeal is scheduled for April 14, 2023.

== 2026 Data Breach ==
In 2026, the FBI reported a possible data breach after the cybercriminal group ShinyHunters claimed to have breached the systems. Initial claims are that the group used a vulnerability known as zero-day vulnerability in Oracle PeopleSoft software. The announcement of the apparent hacking was first published by online cybersecurity and technology news publication 404 Media. The alleged data breach was claimed by ShinyHunters to be retribution for a public advisory from the FBI about the cybercriminal organization. ShinyHunters then made threats after the cybersecuity incident if the bureau does not "correct of simply REMOVE" the advisory.

== Delaney Hall ==
During the 2026 Delaney Hall protests, FBI agents contacted protesters who had been arrested in an attempt to gather information about protesters. The FBI also contacted the families and friends of arrested protesters, and FBI agents performed knock and talks at protester homes. The Intercept characterized this as the FBI trying to "flip" protesters into informants, and public defenders representing the arrestees argued this violated the protesters' rights to legal representation.

== See also ==
- PRISM a mass surveillance NSA program.
- National Security Agency (NSA)
- Central Intelligence Agency (CIA)
- Backdoor (computing) An installation made on a computer in order to break into a computer.
- Twitter Files
- List of ATF Controversies
- List of CIA controversies
- List of IRS controversies
