= Compromised (book) =

2020 non-fiction book by Peter Strzok

Compromised: Counterintelligence and the Threat of Donald J. Trump
- First edition cover
- Author: Peter Strzok
- Cover artist: Brian Moore
- Language: English
- Subject: Investigates the administration of Donald J. Trump as a source of Russian intelligence
- Genre: Nonfiction
- Publisher: Houghton Mifflin Harcourt
- Publication date: September 8, 2020
- Publication place: USA
- Media type: Print (hardback)
- Pages: 350
- ISBN: 978-0-358-23706-8

Compromised: Counterintelligence and the Threat of Donald J. Trump is a 2020 non-fiction book authored by former FBI agent Peter Strzok. As Deputy Assistant Director of the FBI counterintelligence division, Strzok led the FBI's Crossfire Hurricane investigation of alleged Russian influence upon President Donald Trump and Trump's 2016 campaign. Strzok's book recaps the full arc of the investigation and portrays Trump as profoundly corrupt and a serious threat to national security.

== Author's background ==
Peter Strzok had been a lead agent in the FBI's "Operation Ghost Stories" against Andrey Bezrukov and Yelena Vavilova, a Russian spy couple who were part of the Illegals Program, a network of Russian sleeper agents who were arrested in 2010. By July 2015, he was serving as the section chief of the Counterespionage Section, a subordinate section of the FBI's Counterintelligence Division. In addition to leading the FBI's Crossfire Hurricane investigation, Strzok also served on special counsel Robert Mueller's investigative team until the Justice Department inspector general flagged critical text messages about President Trump Strzok had sent and received during the 2016 campaign. Probably most damaging was a text he sent to co-worker Lisa Page, with whom he was conducting an extramarital affair. He sent Page the following text regarding a possible Trump election, "No. No he won't. We'll stop it." The text soon went public.

Many believed the President and fellow Republicans overreacted to Strzok's blunder, as Trump once recklessly alleged Strzok and others in the FBI had plotted against his campaign and had even committed treason, though treason can be committed only by aiding an enemy of the United States such as Russia, not by offending a private American citizen, including the President. Strzok filed a suit in August 2019 against the Bureau claiming they caved against "unrelenting pressure" from the Trump administration, and that he was "unfairly punished" for expressing his political opinions.

== Premise ==
Strzok's study of Trump's life, and his knowledge and observations as a leading counterintelligence agent in the FBI, led him to believe Trump was and is "compromised" and thus, wittingly or unwittingly, indebted to Putin. He describes the many things (kompromat) Trump did and said before and during his presidency that made him vulnerable to blackmail and pressure from foreign adversaries. Strzok posits the question: "When a president appears to favor personal and Russian interests over those of our nation, has he become a national security threat?" He mentions one very public example related to Trump's business projects in Russia that created the necessary conditions for Trump to be compromised:

As candidate and again as president, Trump lied about his business ties with Russia. "The moment Trump said publicly, 'I have no business dealings with Russia,' he knew he was lying. Putin knew he was lying, and the FBI had reason to believe he was lying. But American citizens didn't know that." Strzok emphasizes, "In this moment Trump became compromised."

== Reception ==
Carlos Lozada of The Washington Post gave a favorable review, of a "compelling tale" but criticized the strength of Strzok's bias against Trump in some instances. Strzok considers Trump a liar who presided over a "heap of perfidy and treachery", a leader "gleefully wreaking havoc on America's political institutions and norms." But Lozada noted importantly that Strzok's description of Trump's being "compromised", did "not mean that the president received regular orders from Russia" or that he did Putin's bidding at Putin's immediate request. Strzok posited that the "compromised liar need not be told what to do ... It all unspools without anyone's ever having to say a word." Trump's extramarital affairs, his issues with his charitable Trump foundation, and his own questionable financial background, particularly the strong suspicion of tax evasion, also compromise him "badly and in a myriad of ways", Strzok contends. And, in turn, a compromised president pursued policies and adopted positions that Strzok sees as "highly suspicious, highly consistent, and highly advantageous to America's historic adversary (Russia)." Strzok, according to Lozada, still considered Trump's criminality as a grey area, however this view may be open to debate. When asked by Robert Mueller if Trump's behavior warranted a conspiracy, Lozada noted Strzok replied "I was skeptical that all the different threads amounted to anything more than bumbling incompetence." Strzok wrote "In my view they (Trump's staff) were most likely a collection of grifters pursuing individual personal interests."

Nicholas Fandos of The New York Times praised the book, and wrote "A former Army officer, Mr. Strzok . . . rose quickly through [the FBI's] ranks, earning a reputation within the bureau as one of its most savvy and reliable counterintelligence agents."

James Traub of The Atlantic strongly praised Strzok's sense of duty in conducting his counterintelligence investigation of Trump. Traub criticized congressional Republicans for attempting to use Strzok's extramarital affair with Lisa Page and poorly timed text as a way of destroying his credibility, while overlooking the relevance and importance of his investigation and service to his country. When asked by Texas Congressman Ted Poe in a congressional oversight hearing how he could conduct an honest and unbiased investigation after texting that he would stop Trump from winning the election, Strzok replied "A judge asks jurors, 'Are you able to set aside your personal opinions and render a judgment based on the facts?' and I and the men and women of the FBI every day take our personal beliefs and set them aside in vigorous pursuit of the truth wherever it lies." Poe replied to Strzok, "I don't believe you".

Lloyd Green of the Guardian, who did opposition research for the political campaign of George H. W. Bush in 1988, also considered the book "compelling reading", but fundamentally disagreed with Strzok's assertion that Trump's "willingness to accept political assistance from an opponent like Russia – and it follows, his willingness to subvert everything that America stands for." He notes that Strzok believed "Our investigations revealed Donald Trump's willingness to further the malign interests of one of our most formidable adversaries, apparently for his own personal gain." Green doles out some criticism of the FBI investigation of Michael Flynn as Strzok appears somewhat contradictory in his evaluation of Flynn as cooperative in demeanor but "repeatedly and inexplicably" lying on other issues. Green most strongly criticized Strzok for his glossing over his extensive and ultimately destructive relationship with Lisa Page, as they were believed to have sent over 20,000 emails to each other, including those used to show he had a bias against Trump.

== See also ==
- Hillary Clinton email controversy
- The Case for Impeachment
- Dezinformatsia: Active Measures in Soviet Strategy
- Disinformation
- The KGB and Soviet Disinformation
- Steele dossier
- Timeline of Russian interference in the 2016 United States elections and Timeline of Russian interference in the 2016 United States elections (July 2016–election day)
- Trump: The Kremlin Candidate?
- Trump–Ukraine scandal
