= FBI secret society conspiracy theory =

American conspiracy theory

The FBI secret society is a conspiracy theory claiming the existence of a group of U.S. Federal Bureau of Investigation (FBI) employees with a collective goal of undermining the Presidency of Donald Trump. The claim was based on the content of a text message sent between two employees of the FBI in 2016. The content of the message was later revealed to likely be a joke and the conspiracy theory was proven false.

== Personalities ==
The two FBI investigators were central to the conspiracy claim:

1. FBI agent Peter Strzok, who was a senior FBI agent working for Special Counsel Robert Mueller's 2017 Special Counsel investigation looking into any links or coordination between Trump's presidential campaign and the Russian government.
2. FBI Lawyer Lisa Page, a trial attorney on Mueller's team. Strzok was having an affair with Page.

The claims regarding a secret society within the FBI and its agenda were mostly promulgated by Republican Senators and their supporters amongst the media.

== Timeline ==
On November 9, 2016, a day after the 2016 United States elections, a text message was sent from Lisa Page to Peter Strzok, using their government-issued phones. The content of the message was:

"Are you even going to give out your calendars? Seems kind of depressing. Maybe it should just be the first meeting of the secret society."

— Source: ABC News, 2018

Strzok did not reply to the message and there is no further mention of a "secret society" in texts either before or after the one from Page. The message made reference to Vladimir Putin-themed calendars that Strzok had purchased for the FBI agents working on the early stage of the Russia investigation.

On January 23, 2018, Representative Trey Gowdy made claims on Fox News Insider about the text message including that it revealed a "stunning level of anti-Trump bias" within the FBI. "It's the day after the election and it's the same two people who were discussing a little bit later in the texts the damage they had done with the Clinton investigation and how they could 'fix it' and make it right," Gowdy said. "That is a level of bias that is stunning among law enforcement officers."

Senator Ron Johnson, chair of the United States Senate Committee on Homeland Security and Governmental Affairs, appeared on Fox News on January 23, 2018, and reported that an unnamed “informant” had told him about secretive “off-site” meetings among FBI agents. “That secret society, we have an informant that’s talking about a group that was holding secret meetings offsite,” Johnson claimed. Johnson also claimed that the meetings involved "a number of high level, FBI officials," though he declined to identify the officials involved or whether the informant worked at the FBI.

On January 24, 2018 ABC News reported the text they had obtained verbatim.

The text messages seemed to confirm prior speculation on right-wing websites and cable news, including Fox News personality Sean Hannity's personal website. Hannity claimed that a "recent treasure trove of text messages exchanged between FBI officials reveal a covert 'secret society' at the bureau, suggesting a cabal of officials at the Department of Justice sought to oppose President Trump the day after his election. According to Fox News, Peter Strzok –a senior FBI agent involved in the investigation of Hillary Clinton’s private email server- sent multiple messages to DOJ lawyer Lisa Page, mentioning a 'secret society' to fight the Trump agenda in November 2016." He also stated that "Senator Ron Johnson raised eyebrows throughout Washington Tuesday night, telling reporters the GOP legislator has an informant inside the FBI who confirmed the existence of an anti-Trump ‘secret society’ at the Department of Justice."

A day later Johnson changed his claims about the secret society, amid backlash from Senator Chuck Schumer. Schumer said "It looked delusional. It looked paranoid. What began as an attempt to discredit the investigator has now devolved into delusional, self-serving paranoia." Johnson responded that "We're not going to be deterred at all by whatever comments, derogatory-wise, that Sen. Schumer made" and alleged "corruption at the highest levels of the FBI." Johnson did amend his previous statement saying that he had used the term "secret society" only because Strzok and Page had done so. Johnson said he was not surprised when he read about the secret society because he is part of "the committee that whistle-blowers come to to talk about all kinds of problems throughout the federal government." "Everything I take with a grain of salt," he added. Johnson told reporters that he wasn’t sure what the text between the two FBI officials actually meant and that “secret society” was simply the term used by the two officials.

Claims were also made that there were additional messages which confirmed the secret society and the bias against Trump but the Representatives who made the claims refused to release the texts to the media.

At this point the text message was suspected of being a joke and was portrayed that way in the media.

== Interpretations ==
The message between Page and Strzok was an attempt at humor because they were disappointed after the election and the joke "seemed less funny" the day after Donald Trump won.

Former White House ethics lawyer Richard Painter summed up the situation as follows: Other than misusing their government-issued phones, neither Strzok or Page broke the law. Most likely they communicated on their work phones to hide their affair from their spouses and were not plotting against Trump. He said, "They’re making a big whoopty-do about nothing.... If they had been using their personal phones to talk about Trump, they would have been perfectly in their right to do so. You are bound to find career government workers who don’t like Trump, and you’re bound to find career government workers who send text messages about not liking Trump, and among those you are going to find some that are in each other’s beds when they shouldn’t’ be. Big deal. Congress shouldn’t be wasting our money looking through the texts of these bozos. The only people whose time it’s worth going through their texts are divorce attorneys on behalf of their spouses."

== See also ==
- Spygate (conspiracy theory)
