= Inspector General report on the Zero Tolerance Policy =

DOJ-OIG Report (2020-01-14)

Review of the Department of Justice's Planning and Implementation of Its Zero Tolerance Policy and Its Coordination with the Department of Homeland Security and Health and Human Services is a report by the United States Department of Justice Office of the Inspector General which was released on December 9, 2020, by Inspector General Michael E. Horowitz. The report reviewed the Trump administration's family separation policy, and in particular the "zero-tolerance" policy that was espoused by then U.S. Attorney General Jeff Sessions and how DOJ planned, implemented, and coordinated the policy with DHS and DHHS.

== Background ==
On April 6, 2018, Attorney General Jeff Sessions directed federal prosecutors "to adopt immediately a zero-tolerance policy for all offenses" related to the misdemeanor of improper entry into the United States, and that this "zero-tolerance policy shall supersede any existing policies". This would criminally convict first-time offenders whereas historically they had faced civil and administrative removal, while criminal convictions were usually reserved for those who committed the felony of illegal re-entry after removal.

The policy was notably unpopular, more so than any other major bill or executive action in recent memory. Poll aggregates show that approximately 25 percent of Americans supported the policy, although a majority of Republicans supported it. Following the May announcement, dozens of protest demonstrations were held, attracting thousands. In Washington, D.C., Democratic members of Congress marched in protest. The Office of the United Nations High Commissioner for Human Rights called for the Trump administration to "immediately halt" its policy of separating children from their parents, and human rights activists have criticized that the policy, insofar as it is also applied to asylum seekers, defies Article 31 of the Refugee Convention.

Despite previously asserting that "You can't [reverse the policy] through an executive order", on June 20, 2018, Trump bowed to intense political pressure and signed an executive order to reverse the policy while still maintaining "zero tolerance" border control by detaining entire families together. Asked by a reporter why he had taken so long to sign the order, Trump asserted, "It's been going on for 60 years. Sixty years. Nobody has taken care of it. Nobody has had the political courage to take care of it. But we're going to take care of it." The Trump administration said that they would use the governments "central database" to reconnect the thousands of families that had been separated. However, with the release of emails obtained by NBC News in 2019 it was discovered that there was no central database and the government had only enough information to reconnect 60 children with their parents.

== Findings ==
The report found that "the department did not effectively plan for or coordinate with the U.S. Attorney's offices, the U.S. Marshals Service, DHS, or DHHS, about the impact that family unit adult prosecutions under the zero tolerance policy would have on children, despite senior leaders' awareness that it would result in the separation of children."

The DOJ also didn't plan for the operational, resource, and management impacts that a "substantial increase in immigration prosecutions resulting from the zero tolerance policy" would have on the USMS, the USAOs, and the Federal Courts.

== Reactions ==
The findings led Rod Rosenstein, who had been Trump's Attorney General at the time the policy was enforced, to admit that family separations "should never have been implemented". According to an NBC News report on the investigation, "The report could provide a road map for the incoming Biden administration to investigate those responsible for a policy President-elect Joe Biden has called criminal."
