= List of ATF controversies =

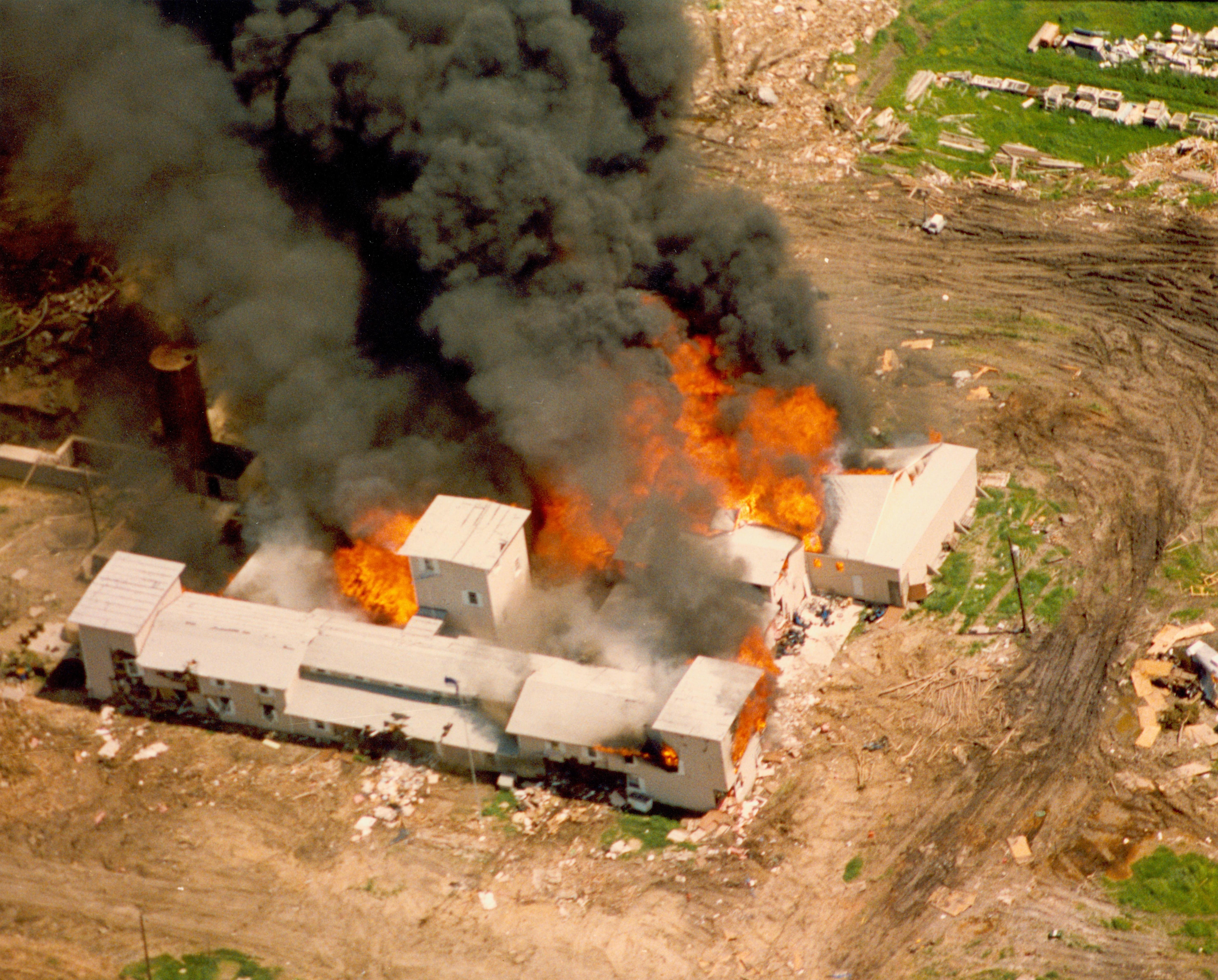
The Branch Davidian compound near Waco, Texas, in flames on April 19, 1993, following a 51-day siege involving the ATF, FBI, and other law enforcement agencies. The fire resulted in the deaths of 76 people, including 20 children.

The following is a list of controversies involving the Bureau of Alcohol, Tobacco, Firearms and Explosives (ATF). Throughout its history, the ATF has been the subject of a number of controversial cases, both at home and abroad. Notable examples include the sieges at Ruby Ridge and Waco, and the gunwalking scandal. These incidents have drawn intense criticism from gun activists and members of the United States Congress, who accuse the agency of excessive force, poor oversight and planning, and constitutional violations. The ATF's role in these events, along with broader concerns over its authority and mission, has led to repeated calls for its reform or abolition, including multiple legislative efforts to do so.

== Ruby Ridge standoff ==
The Ruby Ridge standoff was the siege of a cabin occupied by the Weaver family in Boundary County, Idaho, in August 1992. On August 21, deputies of the United States Marshals Service (USMS) came to arrest Randy Weaver under a bench warrant for his failure to appear on federal firearms charges after he was given the wrong court date. The charges stemmed from Weaver's sale of a sawed-off shotgun to Kenneth Fadeley, an ATF informant, who had induced him to modify the firearm below the legal barrel length. This transaction was recorded and presented to the court. Although Weaver's court date was rescheduled to a day later than originally assigned, he was not notified of the change and consequently missed the hearing.

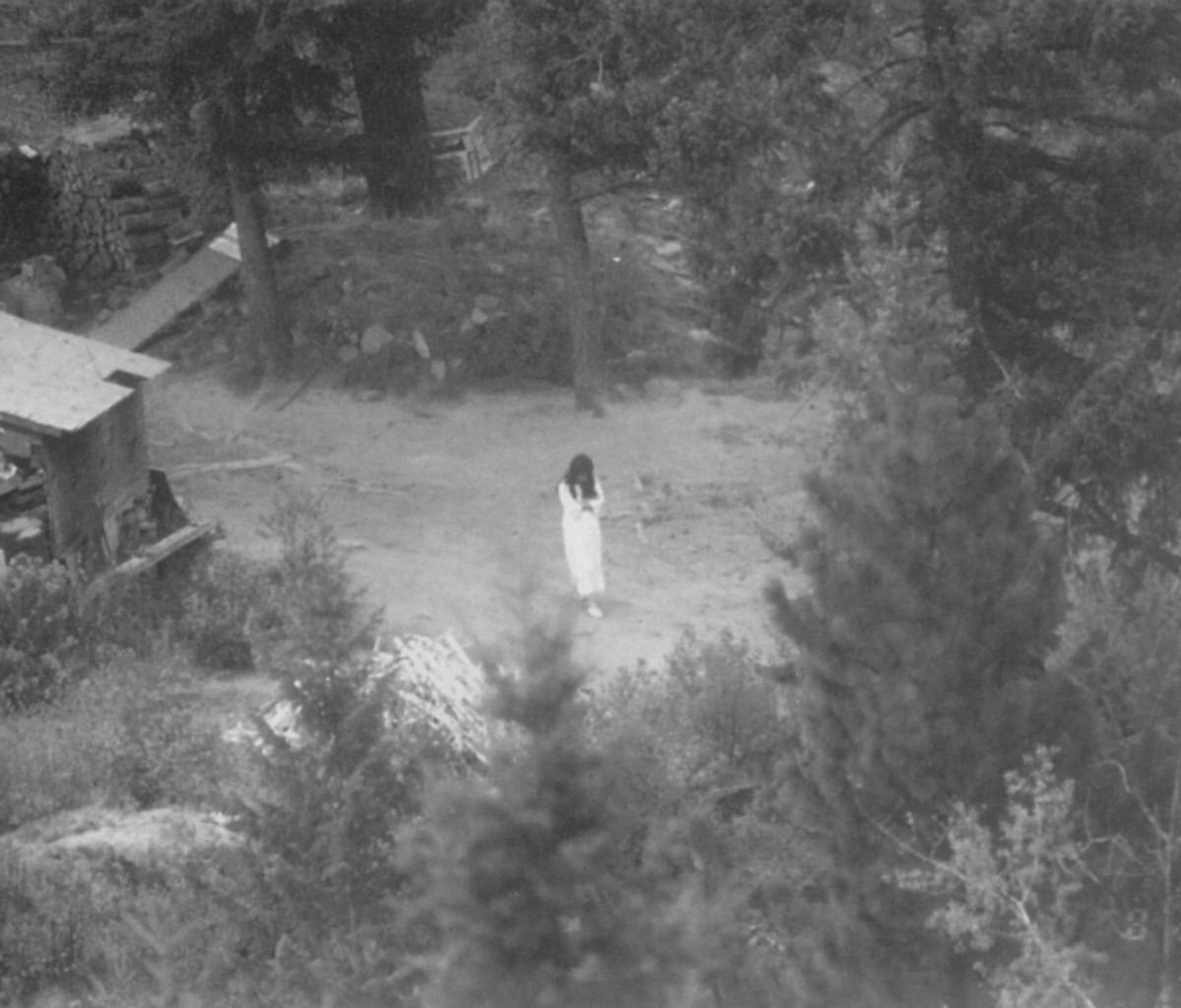
Photo of Vicki Weaver, who was killed by an FBI sniper during the 1992 Ruby Ridge standoff. It began after an ATF firearms investigation into her husband, Randy Weaver's alleged firearm law violations.

During a surveillance operation, U.S. Marshal Art Roderick shot Weaver's dog when it ran at them and then pointed his rifle at Weaver's 14-year-old son, Samuel, who was armed. Samuel fired back at the marshals, and was shot in the back and killed by the team. In the ensuing exchange of fire, Weaver's friend Kevin Harris shot and killed Deputy Marshal William Francis Degan Jr. Weaver, Harris, and members of Weaver's immediate family refused to surrender. The Hostage Rescue Team of the Federal Bureau of Investigation (FBI HRT) became involved as the siege was mounted. In the standoff, FBI sniper Lon Horiuchi shot Weaver, then shot Harris, but the second shot also hit and killed Weaver's wife Vicki. The conflict was ultimately resolved by civilian negotiators, including veteran activist Bo Gritz, who eventually convinced them to surrender. Harris surrendered and was arrested on August 30; Weaver and his three daughters surrendered the next day.

In the aftermath of the siege, Weaver was acquitted of all charges. Weaver sued the federal government and was given $3.1 million in a settlement. Despite the ATF not participating in the siege, this incident has led many to criticize the ATF and how it chooses to carry out enforcement.

== Waco siege ==
ATF was involved in the Waco siege against the Branch Davidian religious sect near Waco, Texas, on February 28, 1993. ATF agents, accompanied by the press, conducted a raid to execute a federal search warrant on the sect's compound, known as Mt. Carmel. The Branch Davidians were alerted to the upcoming warrant execution, but ATF raid leaders pressed on, despite knowing the advantage of surprise was lost. (ATF Director Steve Higgins had promised Treasury Under Secretary for Enforcement Ron Noble that the Waco raid would be canceled if the ATF undercover agent Robert Rodriguez reported that the element of surprise had been lost.) Gunfire erupted — though it remains disputed who fired first — killing six Branch Davidians and four ATF agents, and wounding 15 additional ATF agents. FBI HRT later took over the scene and a 51-day stand-off ensued, ending on April 19, 1993, after the complex caught fire.

The follow-up investigation revealed the bodies of 76 people including 25 children inside the compound. Many of the deceased had fatal gunshot wounds, suggesting suicide or murder-suicide occurred inside the compound during the fire. The vast majority of deaths — including all of the children — occurred on April 19. Shortly after the raid, the bureau's director, Stephen E. Higgins, retired early from his position. In December 1994, two ATF supervisory agents, Phillip J. Chojnacki and Charles D. Sarabyn, who were suspended for their roles in leading the Waco raid were reinstated, with full back pay and benefits (with a demotion) despite a Treasury Department report of gross negligence. The incident was removed from their personnel files.

ATF has received significant criticism for their actions at Waco. The Waco siege has become a "symbol of government oppression" by those critical of the government generally. Critics blame the ATF for improper planning, execution, and communication during the initial February 28 raid. However, the deaths of the women and children in the compound occurred on April 19, 1993, during the FBI's tear-gas assault weeks after ATF had transferred operational control to the FBI. Congressional hearings found that both the Branch Davidians and federal agencies bore shared responsibility for the eventual outcome. Surviving Branch Davidians and more than a hundred family members filed a wrongful-death lawsuit against the federal government, but in a 2000 trial, a five-member jury found that the United States had not acted negligently in any respect, and U.S. District Judge Walter S. Smith Jr. entered a "take-nothing" judgment against the plaintiffs. The U.S. Court of Appeals for the Fifth Circuit affirmed the judgment in Andrade v. Chojnacki, 338 F.3d 448 (5th Cir. 2003), and the U.S. Supreme Court denied certiorari in 2004, concluding the litigation without any finding of legal liability against ATF or other federal agents.The siege is widely regarded as one of the most significant law enforcement failures in modern U.S. history, involving failures of planning and command at ATF, tactical and disclosure failures by the FBI, and actions by David Koresh and the Branch Davidians that investigators determined contributed directly to the final outcome.

== Operation Fast and Furious ==
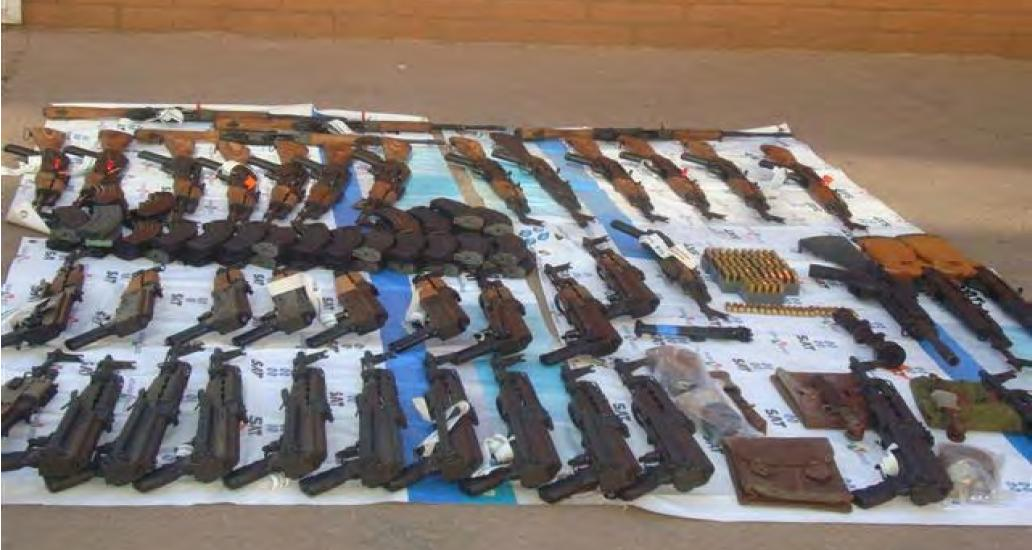
42 weapons recovered by Mexican military in Naco, Sonora, Mexico, 20 Nov 2009; weapons were investigated by U.S. ICE. Operation Fast and Furious suspect Uriel Patino bought 19 of the weapons pictured one to two weeks earlier.

Operation Fast and Furious was a controversial gunwalking operation jointly run by the ATF's Arizona Field Office and the U.S. Attorney's Office for the District of Arizona between 2009 and 2011 under Project Gunrunner. The operation's central strategy -- allowing licensed gun dealers to sell firearms to known straw purchasers without interdiction, with the alleged goal of tracking weapons to high-level Mexican cartel members -- was developed and approved by both ATF Phoenix leadership and U.S. Attorney Arizona prosecutors. Multiple ATF field agents internally opposed the strategy and were directed to continue surveillance without making arrests or seizing firearms, even when probable cause existed. The operation also suffered from major technical failures, such as short-lived GPS trackers and a lack of coordination. This resulted in most of the 2,000 tracked weapons disappearing. Only about 710 were recovered, and none of the targeted cartel leaders were arrested as of 2011.

The operation faced intense scrutiny after weapons linked to it were found at numerous crime scenes, including the 2010 murder of U.S. Border Patrol Agent Brian Terry. Whistleblowers from within the ATF alerted Congress to the operation's failures, sparking investigations, and the scandal eventually led Attorney General Eric Holder being held in contempt of Congress after refusing to release related documents. The fallout damaged U.S.-Mexico relations and exposed deep flaws in ATF oversight and interagency communication.

== Reactions ==
=== Oklahoma City Bombing ===
Timothy McVeigh, the person who orchestrated the Oklahoma City Bombing, cited Ruby Ridge and the Waco Siege as his primary motivations. He did the bombing of the federal building on April 19, 1995, exactly two years after the end of the Waco Siege.

=== David Chipman nomination ===
In April 2021, David Chipman was nominated by the Biden Administration to be the director of the ATF. A primary contention to his nomination was that he participated in the Waco Siege. While Chipman was not sent to the site until early May, after the siege had transpired, this was still used as justification to oppose his nomination. Biden withdrew his support for Chipman's nomination later that year following strong opposition due to Chipman's work with gun control groups Everytown and Giffords.

=== Calls to abolish the ATF ===
As a result of these controversies, and opposition to the ATF as an institution generally, there have been efforts to eliminate the agency. In 2025, Representative Lauren Boebert and Representative Eric Burlison introduced H.R. 129 titled the Abolish the ATF Act. Rep. Burlison cited that a motivation for introducing the legislation was that the agency "believes it can infringe on constitutional liberties without consequence." Representative Matt Gaetz has also called for the ATF to be abolished or defunded.

== See also ==
- List of CIA controversies
- List of FBI controversies
- List of IRS controversies
