= Southern Compromise =

Southern Compromise may refer to the following pieces of American legislation:

- Compromise of 1850, package of five bills regarding slavery in new territories, designed to avoid secession or civil war
- Southern Compromise Amendment of 1867, legislation about Black Southerners' civil rights in the Reconstruction Era of the United States
- Compromise of 1877, about inaugurating Rutherford B. Hayes in exchange for recognizing Southern Democratic governors
