= Inspector General report on FBI and DOJ actions in the 2016 election =

U.S. investigative report into Hillary Clinton's private email server

DOJ-OIG Report. (June 14, 2018)

A Review of Various Actions by the Federal Bureau of Investigation and Department of Justice in Advance of the 2016 Election is the official 568-page report of the actions taken by the FBI and Department of Justice (DOJ) during the 2016 U.S. presidential election connected with Hillary Clinton's use of a private email server, prepared by the Department of Justice Office of the Inspector General (OIG) "in response to requests from numerous Chairmen and Ranking Members of Congressional oversight committees, various organizations, and members of the public."

Released on June 14, 2018, after several delays, the OIG, led by Michael E. Horowitz, reviewed about 1.2 million documents and interviewed more than 100 witnesses, including former FBI director James Comey, former Attorney General (AG) Loretta Lynch, former Deputy Attorney General (DAG) Sally Yates, and former president Bill Clinton.

== Focus ==
The Inspector General's office centered on six primary allegations regarding Clinton's private email server:

- allegations that DOJ or FBI policies or procedures were not followed in regards to then-FBI director James Comey's public announcement on July 5, 2016, and Comey's letters to Congress on October 28 and November 6, 2016
- allegations that certain investigative decisions were based on improper considerations
- allegations that then FBI Deputy Director Andrew McCabe should have been recused from participating in certain investigative matters
- allegations that the DOJ's then Assistant Attorney General for Legislative Affairs, Peter Kadzik, improperly disclosed non-public information and/or should have been recused from participating in certain matters
- allegations that Department and FBI employees improperly disclosed non-public information during the course of the investigation
- allegations that decisions regarding the timing of the FBI's release of certain Freedom of Information Act (FOIA) documents on October 30 and November 1, 2016, and the use of a Twitter account to publicize this release, were influenced by improper considerations

== Findings ==
The OIG discovered text messages and instant messages between three FBI employees which expressed hostility toward 2016 Republican presidential candidate Donald Trump and support for his opponent, Hillary Clinton. The report stated that while there was evidence of political leanings found, the bias did not affect any decision the agents made in their professional capacities relative to the email investigation.

=== James Comey ===
The report was critical of James Comey. Regarding his July press conference, in which he criticized Clinton even while announcing the investigation was over, the IG said it was "extraordinary and insubordinate for Comey to conceal his intentions (about the press conference) from his superiors", and that "we found none of his reasons to be a persuasive basis for deviating from well-established Department policies." Comey's October decision to send a letter notifying Congress that the investigation had been re-opened one week before the election was described as "ad-hoc" and "a serious error in judgment". Horowitz concluded that prosecutorial decisions in the Clinton case were consistent with precedent and were not affected by bias. Likewise the investigation found no evidence to support claims by Donald Trump and his supporters that the FBI "rigged the case to clear Clinton". The report cites multiple instances of unprofessionalism, bias, and misjudgment, which could have a deleterious effect on the FBI's credibility.

=== FBI employee text messages ===
Horowitz stated that he was "deeply troubled" by text messages sent between FBI agent Peter Strzok and FBI lawyer Lisa Page. The report also examined the texts of three anonymous FBI agents assigned to the Clinton investigation, which were critical of then-candidate Donald Trump. Some of the messages exchanged between FBI employees derided Trump supporters as "retarded" and "lazy POS," also writing "screw you trump[,]" "fuck trump," and "Vive le Resistance". An FBI agent who interviewed Clinton for the email investigation also sent a text message to another FBI agent saying "I'm ... with her," referencing one of the Clinton's campaign slogans. Another FBI attorney was found to have sent anti-Trump texts and had been assigned to the Clinton investigation, the investigation into Russian interference, as well as the Mueller probe. Described as "FBI Attorney 2" in the report, he lamented Trump's victory the day after the election, stating "I just can't imagine the systematic disassembly of the progress we made over the last 8 years," and called then-Vice President-elect Mike Pence "stupid" in another text.

In his report, Horowitz stated that the Strzok–Page texts "potentially indicated or created the appearance that investigative decisions were impacted by bias or improper considerations," and at a minimum, that they "demonstrated extremely poor judgment and a gross lack of professionalism." Horowitz cited an exchange between Page and Strzok in particular, in which Strzok said that Trump would not become president because "we" would "stop it". Strzok told the OIG that this text "was intended to reassure Page that Trump would not be elected, not to suggest that he would do something to impact the investigation." Strzok's attorney stated that he "was never influenced by political views." The report stated that these texts showed a "willingness to take official action" to stop Trump from becoming president. Strzok admitted to House Judiciary Chairman Bob Goodlatte (R-VA) that he had not turned over all of his text messages to the Inspector General, and that he had been allowed to determine which ones had "material that was relevant to FBI business".

Strzok, Page, and the three unnamed FBI officials (including FBI attorney 2) were referred to the FBI's Office of Professional Responsibility for potential disciplinary action as a result of their politically charged communications.

== Aftermath and reactions ==
Republicans and supporters of Donald Trump saw the report as vindication for Trump's belief that the FBI acted improperly in their investigation into Clinton's email server. Congressmen Matt Gaetz, Andy Biggs, and Ron DeSantis sent a letter to Horowitz asking for "all the drafts of the report", said they have "every confidence" the investigation was "thorough and accurate," but stated they have concerns it had been altered in such a way that "obfuscates [his] findings." Democrats accused the White House of using the report to distract from the special counsel's Russia investigation. Illinois Democratic Senator Dick Durbin argued that the report showed that the FBI's actions hurt Clinton's campaign and actually aided Trump's.

James Comey responded on Twitter, stating: "I respect the DOJ IG office, which is why I urged them to do this review. The conclusions are reasonable, even though I disagree with some. People of good faith can see an unprecedented situation differently. I pray no Director faces it again. Thanks to IG's people for hard work."

Hillary Clinton reacted to the report's revelation that Comey had used a personal email account to conduct FBI business on five occasions, tweeting "But my emails." Comey responded to this tweet in an interview with the German newspaper Die Zeit, saying the Clinton email investigation was not about her use of private emails, but on classified material sent through this system.

President Trump rejected the report's conclusion that the FBI acted with no political bias against him, and he falsely claimed that the report "totally exonerates me" with respect to the Special Counsel investigation. Trump also said that Comey's actions were "criminal" and prove that he was the "ringleader" of a "den of thieves."

== See also ==
- Mueller special counsel investigation
