= Michael E. Horowitz =

American lawyer and government official (born 1962)

Michael Horowitz
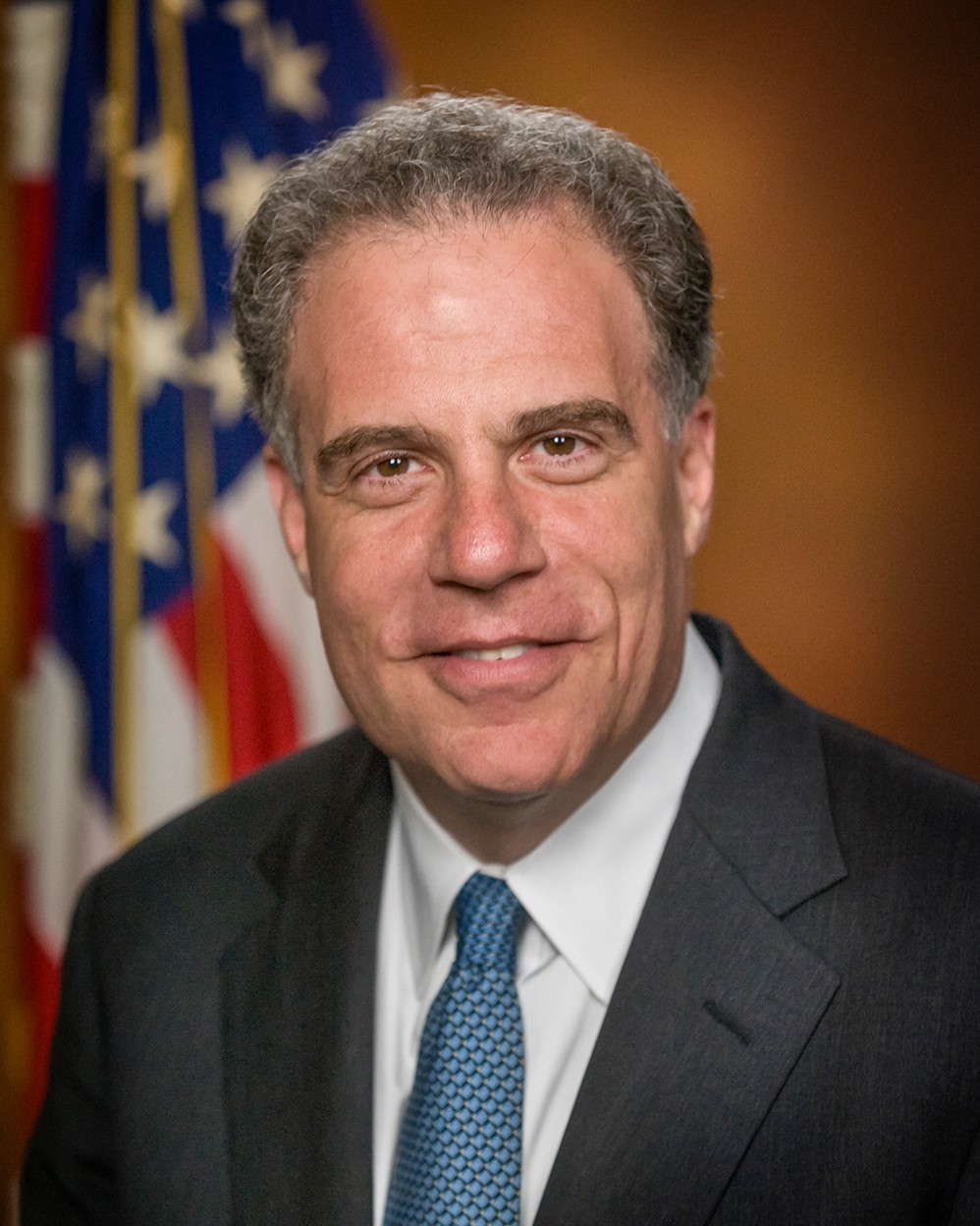

Inspector General of the Federal Reserve Board and Consumer Financial Protection Bureau
- Incumbent
- Assumed office June 30, 2025
- President: Donald Trump
- Preceded by: Glenn Fine

Chair of the Pandemic Response Accountability Committee
- Incumbent
- Assumed office April 29, 2020
- President: Donald Trump; Joe Biden; Donald Trump
- Preceded by: Glenn Fine

Inspector General of the United States Department of Justice
- In office April 16, 2012 – June 30, 2025
- President: Barack Obama; Donald Trump; Joe Biden; Donald Trump
- Preceded by: Cynthia Schnedar (Acting)
- Succeeded by: Don R. Berthiaume

Personal details
- Born: Michael Evan Horowitz; September 19, 1962 (age 64) New York City, New York, U.S.
- Education: Brandeis University (BA); Harvard University (JD)

Michael Evan Horowitz (born September 19, 1962) is an American attorney and government official. He is the Inspector General for the Federal Reserve Board and Consumer Financial Protection Bureau. He previously served as Inspector General of the United States Department of Justice from 2012 to 2025.

== Early life and education ==
Horowitz is the son of Jewish parents, Anne J. and Fred Horowitz. His father owned the women's clothing manufacturer Paul Alfred Inc. and his mother owned an antique store in Nyack, New York. He earned a Bachelor of Arts, summa cum laude, from Brandeis University majoring in economics and minoring in legal studies. He then earned a Juris Doctor, magna cum laude, from Harvard Law School.

== Career ==
Following law school he served as a law clerk for Judge John G. Davies of the U.S. District Court for the Central District of California. He then worked as an associate at the law firm Debevoise & Plimpton. From 1991 to 1999 he was an assistant U.S. Attorney for the Southern District of New York. From 1999 to 2002 he worked at the Department of Justice headquarters in Washington D.C., first as a deputy assistant attorney general, then as chief of staff. In 2002 he returned to private practice as a partner at Cadwalader, Wickersham & Taft, where he focused on white collar defense, internal investigations, and regulatory compliance. During this time he also served as a commissioner on the U.S. Sentencing Commission—a position for which he was confirmed by the Senate in 2003.

== Inspector General for the Department of Justice ==
Horowitz was sworn in as the Inspector General of the United States Department of Justice on April 16, 2012. Since 2015, he has also been the chair of the Council of the Inspectors General on Integrity and Efficiency (CIGIE), an organization consisting of all 73 federal Inspectors General. The New York Times reported he was not among at least twelve inspectors general fired by President Donald Trump four days into his second term.

=== Review of ATF's Operation Fast and Furious ===
In September 2012, Horowitz released a 471-page report on the Bureau of Alcohol, Tobacco, Firearms and Explosives' Operation Fast and Furious, in which ATF agents allowed illegal gun purchases to proceed with the intention of tracking the weapons to Mexican drug cartels. The report found "a pattern of serious failures" and recommended 14 federal officials for disciplinary action. Horowitz found no evidence that Attorney General Eric Holder knew about the operation before early 2011. Following the report's release, Acting ATF Director Kenneth Melson and Deputy Assistant Attorney General Jason Weinstein resigned.

=== Review on FBI and DOJ actions in the 2016 election ===
Horowitz announced in January 2017 that the Inspector General's office would examine evidence related to "allegations of misconduct" regarding FBI Director James B. Comey's handling of the investigation into Hillary Clinton's email practices and whether Justice Department employees leaked information improperly during the run-up to the 2016 United States presidential election. In June 2018, Horowitz released his report, concluding that Peter Strzok and other FBI employees "brought discredit to themselves" and to the agency. He found that Comey indulged in ad hoc decision making and did not follow FBI procedures, but did not find that he was motivated by any political bias.

=== Review of 4 FISA Applications and the Crossfire Hurricane investigation ===
Another investigation into the FBI and Justice Department was launched by Horowitz in March 2018. This investigation targeted the FBI and Justice Department's filing of four FISA applications and renewals to surveil former Trump campaign adviser Carter Page and whether or not there was an abuse of this FISA process. A redacted version of the report of the investigation was released December 9, 2019. On November 18, 2019 Senator Lindsey Graham, Chairman of the Senate Judiciary Committee, announced that Horowitz would testify before the committee on December 11 regarding the investigation and provide recommendations on how judicial and investigative systems could be improved.

On December 9, 2019, Horowitz released his report stating that the FBI found 17 “basic and fundamental” errors and omissions in its applications to the Foreign Intelligence Surveillance Court (FISA Court), but did not find political bias during the investigation of Trump and Russia, nor did he find evidence that the FBI attempted to place people inside the Trump campaign or report on the Trump campaign. However, in a Senate hearing, Horowitz stated he could not rule out political bias as a possible motivation. The report found that the FBI had a legal "authorized investigative purpose and with sufficient factual predication" to ask for court approval to begin surveillance of Carter Page, a former Trump campaign adviser.

=== Pandemic Response Accountability Committee ===
Horowitz appointed Glenn Fine to chair the Pandemic Response Accountability Committee (PRAC), but Trump removed Fine in early April 2020. That month, Horowitz became acting chair of the PRAC.

=== Review of the DOJ's Zero Tolerance Policy ===
In January 2021, the Inspector General for the Department of Justice concluded an investigation into the "zero tolerance" policy, finding that: department leaders underestimated the difficulty of implementing it, failed to tell local prosecutors and others that children would be separated; failed to understand that separations would last longer than a few hours; and failed to halt the policy after that was discovered. The findings led Rod Rosenstein, who had been Trump's Attorney General at the time the policy was enforced, to admit that family separations "should never have been implemented". According to an NBC News report on the investigation, "The report could provide a road map for the incoming Biden administration to investigate those responsible for a policy President-elect Joe Biden has called criminal."

=== Review of DOJ actions related to the 2020 presidential election ===
In January 2021, Horowitz announced an investigation into "whether any former or current DOJ official engaged in an improper attempt to have DOJ seek to alter the outcome of the 2020 Presidential Election." No public report has been released.

=== Trump-era leak investigations review ===
In June 2021, Horowitz announced a review of the Trump administration Justice Department's use of subpoenas to obtain communication records of members of Congress and journalists during leak investigations. The review examined investigations into leaked classified information that appeared in news articles in 2017 related to possible ties between the Trump campaign and Russia.

Horowitz released his findings on December 10, 2024. The report found that prosecutors had secretly subpoenaed phone and email metadata for two members of Congress—Representatives Adam Schiff and Eric Swalwell, both California Democrats—as well as 43 congressional staffers from both parties. Of the staffers, 21 worked in Democratic positions and 20 in Republican positions. All four investigations closed without criminal charges.

Horowitz found "no evidence of retaliatory or political motivation by the career prosecutors" but concluded that subpoenaing congressional records "risks chilling Congress's ability to conduct oversight of the executive branch." The report found the Justice Department violated its own policies by failing to convene its News Media Review Committee and, in one investigation, failing to obtain required approval from the Director of National Intelligence. Former Attorney General William Barr, who had personally approved the news media subpoenas in 2020, declined to be interviewed for the investigation.

=== Review of FBI handling of Larry Nassar allegations ===
In July 2021, Horowitz released a report finding that senior officials in the FBI Indianapolis Field Office "failed to respond to allegations of sexual abuse" by former USA Gymnastics physician Larry Nassar "with the urgency that the allegations required." The report found that approximately 70 athletes were sexually abused by Nassar between July 2015, when the FBI first received allegations, and September 2016, when he was arrested following a separate investigation.

The report also found that Indianapolis Field Office officials made false statements to investigators when the matter came under scrutiny. Horowitz made criminal referrals for two FBI officials, which the Department of Justice declined to prosecute. Following the report, FBI Director Christopher A. Wray fired one of the agents involved. In April 2024, the Department of Justice reached a $138.7 million settlement with 139 of Nassar's victims over the FBI's failures.

=== Review of the FBI Richmond Catholic memo ===
In April 2024, Horowitz released a review of an internal FBI memo that identified "radical traditionalist Catholics" as potential domestic violent extremists. The review found "no malicious intent" behind the memo but documented procedural failures, including that the memo's authors knew their sources—including the Southern Poverty Law Center—had political bias but provided no caveats about credibility in the final document.

=== January 6 confidential human sources review ===
On December 12, 2024, Horowitz released an 88-page report examining the FBI's handling of confidential human sources and intelligence collection ahead of the January 6, 2021, U.S. Capitol attack.

The report found no evidence that undercover FBI employees were present at the protests or Capitol on January 6. The review determined that 26 FBI confidential human sources were in Washington, D.C. that day, with 23 attending on their own initiative rather than at FBI direction. Four confidential human sources entered the Capitol during the riot, and an additional 11 entered the restricted area around the building. The report stated that none were authorized by the FBI to enter the Capitol or restricted areas, break the law, or encourage others to commit illegal acts.

Horowitz found that the FBI failed to canvass its field offices for intelligence from confidential human sources before January 6, which "could have helped the FBI and its law enforcement partners with their preparations." FBI Deputy Director Paul Abbate described this as a "basic step that was missed." The report also found that the FBI inaccurately reported to Congress after January 6 that it had directed field offices to canvass their sources, though the inspector general determined this inaccuracy was not intentional.

On December 16, 2024, Senate Judiciary Committee Chairman Chuck Grassley and Senator Ron Johnson wrote to Horowitz requesting additional records, including whether other DOJ component agencies such as the ATF, DEA, and U.S. Marshals Service had confidential human sources present on January 6.

== Inspector General for the Federal Reserve Board and Consumer Financial Protection Bureau ==
In June 2025, Horowitz was appointed by Federal Reserve Chair Jerome Powell to serve as Inspector General of the Federal Reserve Board and Consumer Financial Protection Bureau, effective June 30, 2025. Under federal law, the Federal Reserve chairman appoints the agency's inspector general without presidential input or Senate confirmation. Horowitz succeeded Mark Bialek, who retired in April 2025 after nearly 14 years as inspector general. His deputy at the Department of Justice, William Blier, became acting inspector general upon Horowitz's departure.

== Personal life ==
In 2000, he married Alexandra Leigh Kauffman in Leesburg, Virginia. Kauffman is a former field producer for CNN covering economics and personal finance.

== See also ==
- United States Department of Justice Office of the Inspector General
- ATF gunwalking scandal
- Inspector General report on FBI and DOJ actions in the 2016 election
- Inspector General report on the Crossfire Hurricane investigation
- Inspector General report on the Zero Tolerance Policy
- FBI Richmond Catholic memo investigation
