= The Great Compromise =

The Great Compromise may refer to:

- The Great Compromise (song) by John Prine
- The Great Compromise (album) by The Junior Varsity
- The Connecticut Compromise, provision fundamental to enacting U.S. Constitution
