= No Compromise =

No Compromise may refer to:

- No Compromise (album), the second album release by American pianist and gospel singer Keith Green
- No Compromise (magazine), a San Francisco, California, US–based bi-annual animal rights magazine
- No Compromise (podcast), a Pulitzer Prize for Audio Reporting–winning podcast from NPR about gun rights activists
