= List of CIA controversies =

Controversies involving the Central Intelligence Agency

The Central Intelligence Agency (CIA) has been the subject of a number of controversies, both in and outside the United States. Legacy of Ashes: The History of the CIA by Tim Weiner accuses the CIA of covert actions and human rights abuses. Jeffrey T. Richelson of the National Security Archive has been critical of its claims. Intelligence expert David Wise faulted Weiner for portraying Allen Dulles as "a doddering old man" rather than the "shrewd professional spy" he knew and for refusing "to concede that the agency's leaders may have acted from patriotic motives or that the CIA ever did anything right", but concluded: "Legacy of Ashes succeeds as both journalism and history, and it is must reading for anyone interested in the CIA or American intelligence since World War II." The CIA itself has responded to the claims made in Weiner's book, and has described it as "a 600-page op-ed piece masquerading as serious history."

== Project MKUltra ==
Project MKUltra was a CIA human experimentation program (1953–1973) aimed at developing techniques and drugs for interrogation, brainwashing, and psychological torture. The program, conducted without consent, used methods like administering high doses of LSD, hypnosis, electroshock, sensory deprivation, and other forms of abuse. It violated individual rights and has been widely condemned as a grave abuse of power.

Operating through the CIA's Office of Scientific Intelligence and front organizations, MKUltra involved over 80 institutions, including universities, hospitals, and prisons, often using unwitting subjects in the U.S. and Canada. It was revealed in 1975 by the Church Committee and the Rockefeller Commission, though investigations were hindered by the destruction of most records in 1973. A 1977 FOIA request uncovered 20,000 documents, leading to Senate hearings. Some details were declassified in 2001.

== Domestic wiretapping ==
In 1969, at the height of the antiwar movement in the US, CIA Director Helms received a message from Henry Kissinger ordering him to spy on the leaders of the groups requesting a moratorium on Vietnam. "Since 1962, three successive presidents had ordered the director of central intelligence to spy on Americans".

== Psychological operations in the Philippines ==
During the early 1950s, the CIA operative Edward Lansdale and the U.S. military advisers supported the Philippine government's fight against the communist Hukbalahap (Huk) insurgency. According to Lansdale's own writings and subsequent historical reports, part of the CIA effort involved psychological operations exploiting local superstitions, notably, the Filipino belief in the aswang, a vampire-like creature.

In one incident, the operatives spread rumors that an aswang was living on a hill where the Huks were stationed. Two nights later, special forces ambushed a Huk guerrilla, punctured his neck with two holes to simulate a vampire bite, drained his blood, and displayed his corpse to suggest he was killed by an aswang. This operation spread fear among Huk fighters and their supporters, causing some to leave the area.

== Extraordinary rendition ==
The US Senate Report on CIA Detention Interrogation Program that details the use of torture during CIA detention and interrogation.

Extraordinary rendition is the apprehension and extrajudicial transfer of a person from one country to another.

The term "torture by proxy" is used by some critics to describe situations in which the CIA and other US agencies have transferred suspected terrorists to countries known to employ torture, whether they meant to enable torture or not. It has been claimed, though, that torture has been employed with the knowledge or acquiescence of US agencies (a transfer of anyone to anywhere for the purpose of torture is a violation of US law), although Condoleezza Rice (then the United States Secretary of State) stated that:

the United States has not transported anyone, and will not transport anyone, to a country when we believe he will be tortured. Where appropriate, the United States seeks assurances that transferred persons will not be tortured.

Whilst the Obama administration has tried to distance itself from some of the harshest counterterrorism techniques, it has also said that at least some forms of renditions will continue. The administration continued to allow rendition only "to a country with jurisdiction over that individual (for prosecution of that individual)" when there is a diplomatic assurance "that they will not be treated inhumanely".

The US program has also prompted several official investigations in Europe into alleged secret detentions and unlawful inter-state transfers involving Council of Europe member states. A June 2006 report from the Council of Europe estimated 100 people had been kidnapped by the CIA on EU territory (with the cooperation of Council of Europe members), and rendered to other countries, often after having transited through secret detention centres ("black sites") used by the CIA, some located in Europe. According to the separate European Parliament report of February 2007, the CIA has conducted 1,245 flights, many of them to destinations where suspects could face torture, in violation of article 3 of the United Nations Convention Against Torture.

Following the September 11 attacks the United States, in particular the CIA, has been accused of rendering hundreds of people suspected by the government of being terrorists—or of aiding and abetting terrorist organisations—to third-party states such as Egypt, Jordan, Morocco, and Uzbekistan. Such "ghost detainees" are kept outside judicial oversight, often without ever entering US territory, and may or may not ultimately be devolved to the custody of the United States.

On October 4, 2001, a secret arrangement was made in Brussels, by all members of NATO. Lord George Robertson, British defence secretary and later NATO's secretary-general, would later explain that NATO members agree to provide "blanket overflight clearances for the United States and other allies' aircraft for military flights related to operations against terrorism."

== Security failures ==
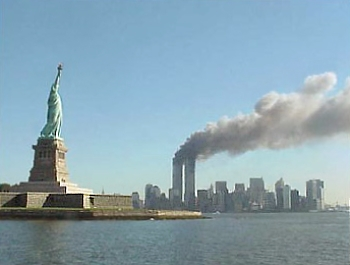
Critics assert that funding the Afghan mujahideen (Operation Cyclone) played a role in causing the September 11 attacks.

On December 30, 2009, a suicide attack occurred in the Forward Operating Base Chapman attack in the province of Khost, Afghanistan. Seven CIA officers, including the chief of the base, were killed and six others seriously wounded in the attack.

The September 11 attacks have been viewed by some as an example of shortcomings for the United States' various intelligence agencies. George W Bush's administration has openly stated they did not foresee the possibility of airliners being used as weapons, despite regular briefings from intelligence agencies and prior incidents of airliners being hijacked domestically and abroad.

== Counterintelligence failures ==
Perhaps the most disruptive incident involving counterintelligence was CIA Counterintelligence Chief James Angleton's search for a mole or moles, based on GRU Colonel Pyotr Popov's allegedly having told his Russia-born CIA handler, George Kisevalter in April 1958 that he had recently heard a drunken GRU colonel brag that the Kremlin knew all about the Lockheed U-2 spy plane, and the December 1961-on statements of a Soviet defector, KGB Major Anatoliy Golitsyn. A second defector, putative KGB officer Yuri Nosenko, who contacted the CIA in Geneva six months after Golitsyn's defection, challenged Golitsyn's claims, with the two calling one another Soviet double agents. Many CIA officers fell under career-ending suspicion; the details of the relative truths and untruths from Nosenko and Golitsyn may never be released, or, in fact, may not be fully understood. The accusations also crossed the Atlantic to the British intelligence services, which also were damaged by molehunts.

Edward Lee Howard, David Henry Barnett, both field operations officers, sold secrets to Russia. William Kampiles, a low-level worker in the CIA 24-hour Operations Center, sold the Soviets a detailed operational manual for the KH-11 reconnaissance satellite.

== Human rights concerns ==
Operation Condor participants. active members collaborators (United States)

The CIA has been called into question for, at times, using torture, funding and training of groups and organizations that would later participate in killing of civilians and other non-combatants and would try or succeed in overthrowing democratically elected governments, human experimentation, and targeted killings and assassinations. The CIA has also been accused of a lack of financial and whistleblower controls which has led to waste and fraud.

During Bush's year in charge of the CIA, the U.S. national security apparatus actively supported Operation Condor operations and right-wing military dictatorships in Latin America. According to John Dinges, author of The Condor Years (The New Press 2003), documents released in 2015 revealed a CIA report dated April 28, 1978 that showed the agency by then had knowledge, based on Armandro Fernández Larios's testimony, that the Chilean dictator Augusto Pinochet ordered the assassination of Orlando Letelier, a leading political opponent living in exile in the United States.

In 1978, after taking over as director of the newly created National Information Center, General Odlanier Mena established a body to investigate the DINA’s involvement in the assassination of Orlando Letelier. According to a report in El Mercurio from April 2, 2000, based on Mena’s testimony, Manuel Contreras denied knowing Michael Townley or having employed him as a DINA agent. Mena, who had received information from the FBI regarding purchases of electronic equipment made by Townley on behalf of the DINA, didn't believe him cast doubt on those claims and brought the matter before the Military Junta, which met with the former head of the DINA. In the meeting Pinochet asked Contreras if he knew Townley, something he denied three times, then he claimed that Townley had never worked for the Chilean intelligence and that, in the worst-case scenario, he might have acted as an informant. Based on those assurances, he was handed over to the U.S.

Following the meeting, the Junta authorized Townley's expulsion or handover to the United States, where he was interrogated and prosecuted for his participation in the bombing. Townley's departure from Chile did not take place through a conventional extradition process and was considered an expulsion. In addition, Townley also sought protection from Manuel Contreras and Pedro Espinoza. He arrived in the United States on April 8, 1978, and there he negotiated to accept responsibility for building and planting the bomb, and received a reduced sentence and future immunity in exchange for testifying against his assistants, five Cuban exiles. The formal indictment filed by U.S. authorities in 1978 did not include Augusto Pinochet; it targeted Manuel Contreras, Pedro Espinoza, Armando Fernández Larios and Cuban collaborators linked to the bombing, based on the testimony provided by Townley. Townley was also linked by later investigations to the bombings against Carlos Prats and Bernardo Leighton. After serving part of his sentence, he was released under the federal witness protection program.

Chilean officers Raúl Iturriaga Neumann and Manuel Contreras later claimed that Townley had received his assassination orders from the CIA rather than DINA, accusing him of lying to implicate Pinochet and the Chilean government—a claim Townley had anticipated and denied in his own confessions.

The Institute on Medicine as a Profession and the non-profit organization Open Society Foundations reviewed public records into the medical professions alleging complicity in the abuse of prisoners suspected of terrorism who were held in U.S. custody during the years after 9/11. The reports found that health professionals "Aided cruel and degrading interrogations; Helped devise and implement practices designed to maximize disorientation and anxiety so as to make detainees more malleable for interrogation; and Participated in the application of excruciatingly painful methods of force-feeding of mentally competent detainees carrying out hunger strikes" are not all that surprising. Medical professionals were sometimes used at black sites to monitor detainee health. Whether or not the physicians were compelled is an open question.

Other human rights issues that are controversial include the case of Edward Snowden. However, the significance of human right does not fall into this case regarding whether Snowden received his fair trial or not. Rather, the human rights associated with the Snowden leaks are regarding the types of document Snowden released. Snowden released a significant amount of information on the U.S. government's surveillance program of its citizens to The Washington Post as well as foreign news reporters.

Particularly, "between on or about June 5, 2013, and June 9, 2013, classified information was published on the internet and in print by multiple newspapers, including The Washington Post and The Guardian. The articles and internet postings by The Washington Post and The Guardian included classified documents that were marked TOP SECRET. The Washington Post and The Guardian later revealed that SNOWDEN was the principal source for the classified information on or about June 9, 2013, in a videotaped interview with The Guardian, admitted that he was the person who illegally provided those documents to reporters. Evidence indicates that SNOWDEN had access to the classified documents in question; accessed those documents; and, subsequently, provided those documents to media outlets without authorization and in violation of U.S. law."

Furthermore, the leaks included documents at many levels of the National Security Agency (NSA) electronic surveillance activities. "The Snowden leaks have generated broad public debate over issues of security, privacy, and legality inherent in the NSA's surveillance of communications by American citizens." The records include: "White House and ODNI efforts to explain, justify, and defend the programs; Correspondence between outside critics and executive branch officials; Fact sheets and white papers distributed (and sometimes later withdrawn) by the government; Key laws and court decisions (both Supreme Court and Foreign Intelligence Surveillance Court); Documents on the Total Information Awareness (later Terrorist Information Awareness, or TIA) program, an earlier proposal for massive data collection Manuals on how to exploit the Internet for intelligence."

== External investigations and document releases ==
Several investigations led by the Church Committee, Rockefeller Commission and Pike Committee have been conducted about the CIA, and many documents have been declassified.

== Influencing public opinion and law enforcement ==
The CIA sometimes finds itself in conflict with other parts of the government when there is disagreement over the legality of specific covert programs. There is always the risk that one part of the government may make the covert operations of another part of the government public.

== CIA's recruitment of Nazis ==
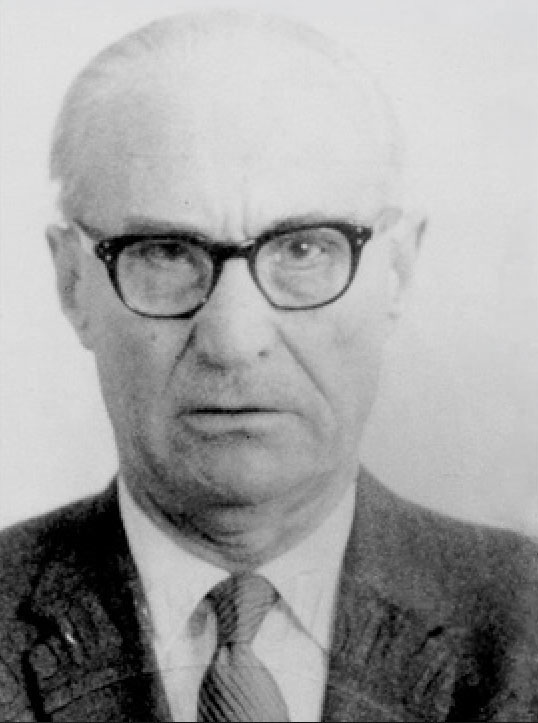
Aleksandras Lileikis, a Nazi unit commander who oversaw the murder of 60,000 Jews in Lithuania, later worked for the CIA.

In 2014, The New York Times reported that "In the decades after World War II, the C.I.A. and other United States agencies employed at least a thousand Nazis as Cold War spies and informants and, as recently as the 1990s, concealed the government's ties to some still living in America, newly disclosed records and interviews show."

According to Timothy Naftali, "The CIA's central concern [in recruiting former Nazi collaborators] was not so much the extent of the criminal's guilt as the likelihood that the agent's criminal past could remain a secret."

== Drug trafficking ==
Two offices of the CIA Directorate of Analysis have analytical responsibilities in this area. The Office of Transnational Issues applies unique functional expertise to assess existing and emerging threats to U.S. national security and provides the most senior U.S. policymakers, military planners, and law enforcement with analysis, warning, and crisis support.

CIA Crime and Narcotics Center researches information on international narcotics trafficking and organized crime for policymakers and the law enforcement community. Since CIA has no domestic police authority, it sends its analytic information to the Federal Bureau of Investigation (FBI), Immigration and Customs Enforcement (ICE) and other law enforcement organizations, such as the Drug Enforcement Administration (DEA) and the Office of Foreign Assets Control of the United States Department of the Treasury (OFAC).

Another part of CIA, the Directorate of Operations, collects human intelligence (HUMINT) in these areas.

Research by Dr. Alfred W. McCoy, Gary Webb, and others has pointed to CIA involvement in narcotics trafficking across the globe, although the CIA officially denies such allegations.

== Lying to Congress ==
Nancy Pelosi has stated that the CIA repeatedly misled Congress since 2001 about waterboarding and other torture, though Pelosi admitted to being told about the programs. Six members of Congress have said that CIA Director Leon Panetta admitted that over a period of several years since 2001 the CIA deceived Congress, including affirmatively lying to Congress. Some Congressmembers believe that these lies to Congress are similar to CIA lies to Congress from earlier periods.

In the early 1990s Richard Barlow asked his managers to correct the record when blatantly false statements had been made to Congress. The official mendacity only became public after Barlow sued the Department of Defense for wrongful termination.

== Wikipedia editing ==
In 2007, the now defunct database Wikiscanner revealed that computers from the CIA had been used to edit articles on the English Wikipedia, including the Iraq War article in 2003, and the article on former CIA executive director William Colby. A spokeswoman for Wikipedia said in response that the changes may violate the encyclopedia's conflict-of-interest guidelines. CIA spokesman George Little said that he could not confirm if CIA computers were used to make the changes, claiming that "the agency always expects its computer systems to be used responsibly."

== Covert programs hidden from Congress ==
On July 10, 2009, House Intelligence subcommittee Chairwoman Representative Jan Schakowsky (D, IL) announced the termination of an unnamed CIA covert program described as "very serious" in nature which had been kept secret from Congress for eight years.

It is not as if this was an oversight and over the years it just got buried. There was a decision under several directors of the CIA and administration not to tell the Congress.

— Jan Schakowsky, Chairwoman, U.S. House of Representatives Intelligence Subcommittee

CIA Director Panetta had ordered an internal investigation to determine why Congress had not been informed about the covert program. Chairman of the House Intelligence Committee Representative Silvestre Reyes announced that he is considering an investigation into alleged CIA violations of the National Security Act, which requires with limited exception that Congress be informed of covert activities. Investigations and Oversight Subcommittee Chairwoman Schakowsky indicated that she would forward a request for congressional investigation to HPSCI Chairman Silvestre Reyes.

Director Panetta did brief us two weeks ago—I believe it was on the 24th of June—... and, as had been reported, did tell us that he was told that the vice president had ordered that the program not be briefed to the Congress.

— Dianne Feinstein, Chairwoman of the U.S. Senate Select Committee on Intelligence

As mandated by Title 50 of the United States Code Chapter 15, Subchapter III, when it becomes necessary to limit access to covert operations findings that could affect vital interests of the U.S., as soon as possible the President must report at a minimum to the Gang of Eight (the leaders of each of the two parties from both the Senate and House of Representatives, and the chairs and ranking members of both the Senate Committee and House Committee for intelligence). At the time the House was expected to support the 2010 Intelligence Authorization Bill including a provision that would require the President to inform more than 40 members of Congress about covert operations. The Obama administration threatened to veto the final version of a bill that included such a provision. On July 16, 2008, the fiscal 2009 Intelligence Authorization Bill was approved by House majority containing stipulations that 75% of money sought for covert actions would be held until all members of the House Intelligence panel were briefed on sensitive covert actions. Under the George W. Bush administration, senior advisers to the President issued a statement indicating that if a bill containing this provision reached the President, they would recommend that he veto the bill.

The program was rumored vis-à-vis leaks made by anonymous government officials on July 23, to be an assassinations program, but this remains unconfirmed. "The whole committee was stunned. I think this is as serious as it gets," stated Anna Eshoo, chairman, Subcommittee on Intelligence Community Management, U.S. House Permanent Select Committee on Intelligence (HPSCI).

Allegations by Director Panetta indicate that details of a secret counterterrorism program were withheld from Congress under orders from former U.S. Vice President Dick Cheney. This prompted Senators Dianne Feinstein and Patrick Leahy, Chairman of the Senate Judiciary Committee to insist that no one should go outside the law. "The agency has not discussed publicly the nature of the effort, which remains classified," said agency spokesman Paul Gimigliano.

The Wall Street Journal reported, citing former intelligence officials familiar with the matter, that the program was an attempt to carry out a 2001 presidential authorization to capture or kill al-Qaeda operatives.

== Intelligence Committee investigation ==
On July 17, 2009, the House Intelligence Committee said it was launching a formal investigation into the secret program. Representative Silvestre Reyes announced the probe will look into "whether there was any past decision or direction to withhold information from the committee".

"Is giving your kid a test in school an inhibition on his free learning?" Holt said. "Sure, there are some people who are happy to let intelligence agencies go about their business unexamined. But I think most people when they think about it will say that you will get better intelligence if the intelligence agencies don't operate in an unexamined fashion."

— Rush Holt, Chairman, House Select Intelligence Oversight Panel, Committee on Appropriations

Congresswoman Jan Schakowsky (D, IL), Chairman of the Subcommittee on Oversight and Investigations, who called for the investigation, stated that the investigation was intended to address CIA failures to inform Congress fully or accurately about four issues: C.I.A. involvement in the downing of a missionary plane mistaken for a narcotics flight in Peru in 2001, and two "matters that remain classified", as well as the rumored-assassinations question. In addition, the inquiry is likely to look at the Bush administration's program of eavesdropping without warrants and its detention and interrogation program. U.S. Intelligence Chief Dennis Blair testified before the House Intelligence Committee on February 3, 2010, that the U.S. intelligence community is prepared to kill U.S. citizens if they threaten other Americans or the United States. The American Civil Liberties Union has said this policy is "particularly troubling" because U.S. citizens "retain their constitutional right to due process even when abroad." The ACLU also "expressed serious concern about the lack of public information about the policy and the potential for abuse of unchecked executive power."

== Use of vaccination program in hunt for Osama bin Laden ==
The agency attracted widespread criticism after it used a local doctor in Pakistan to set up a hepatitis B vaccination program in Abbottabad in 2011 to obtain DNA samples from the occupants of a compound where it was suspected bin Laden was living, hoping to obtain samples from bin Laden or his children in order to confirm his presence. It is unknown whether any useful DNA was acquired from the program, but it was deemed not successful. The doctor was later arrested and sentenced to a lengthy prison term on allegedly unrelated charges. Médecins Sans Frontières criticized the CIA for endangering and undermining trust in medical workers and The New York Times reported that the CIA's action had increased resistance to vaccination programs in Pakistan.

== Improper search of computers used by Senate investigators ==
In July 2014 CIA Director John O. Brennan had to apologize to lawmakers because five CIA employees (two lawyers and three computer specialists) had surreptitiously searched Senate Intelligence Committee files and reviewed some committee staff members' e-mail on computers that were supposed to be exclusively for congressional investigators. Brennan ordered the creation of an internal personnel board, led by former senator Evan Bayh, to review the agency employees' conduct and determine "potential disciplinary measures." However, according to some reports, Brennan didn't apologize for spying or doing anything wrong at all, even though his agency had been improperly accessing computers of the Senate Select Intelligence Committee (SSCI) and then, in the words of investigative reporter Dan Froomkin, "speaking a lie". This accusation was based on the CIA Director's earlier denials of Senator Dianne Feinstein's claims that the surreptitious CIA search of the SSCI computers occurred, was inappropriate, or "violated the separation of powers principles embodied in the United States Constitution, including the Speech and Debate clause" or other laws.

== Resignation of officials and agents who would not work for Donald Trump ==
In February 2017, reports emerged that key experts within the CIA were resigning because they would not work for U.S. President Donald Trump. The Middle East Eye reported that two agents, Americans, who operated spy-rings within ISIS had resigned, because they "...did not want to see the contacts who worked for them sacrificed due to incompetence and anti-Muslim prejudice from within Trump's inner circle." Ned Price, a CIA official since 2006, stirred controversy when he published an op-ed in The Washington Post, explaining why he surprised himself by resigning, after he perceived Trump using his visit to CIA HQ for partisan political posturing.

== WikiLeaks' disclosure of CIA's cyber tools ==
In March 2017, WikiLeaks published more than 8,000 documents on the CIA. The confidential documents, codenamed Vault 7, dated from 2013 to 2016, included details on the CIA's software capabilities, such as the ability to compromise cars, smart TVs, and web browsers, including Google Chrome, Microsoft Edge, Firefox, and Opera, as well as the operating systems of most smartphones including Apple's iOS and Google's Android, and other operating systems such as Microsoft Windows, macOS, and Linux. WikiLeaks did not name the source, but said that the files had "circulated among former U.S. government hackers and contractors in an unauthorized manner, one of whom has provided WikiLeaks with portions of the archive."

In a 2017 speech addressing CSIS, CIA Director Mike Pompeo referred to WikiLeaks as "a non-state hostile intelligence service often abetted by state actors like Russia". He also said: "To give them the space to crush us with misappropriated secrets is a perversion of what our great Constitution stands for. It ends now."

== Chihuahua anti-drug operation ==
In April 2026, CIA agents were operating in Mexico without notifying the country's federal government. After two CIA agents died in a road accident, the Mexican government accused the operation of violating Mexican law. César Jáuregui Moreno, then the state attorney general, was arrested on charges related to the incident and accused of treason in October 2026.

== David Rush ==
In May 2026, ex senior CIA official David Rush, who was acknowledged to have had a top security clearance, was arrested after FBI agents found 303 gold bars which each weighed about 2.2 pounds in his home in Virginia. These gold bars, which were believed to have been stolen, were estimated to be worth more than $40 million.

== See also ==
- 1954 Guatemalan coup d'état
- Abu Omar case
- Blue sky memo
- CIA activities in Indonesia
- CIA's relationship with the United States Military
- Classified information in the United States
- Cubana de Aviación Flight 455
- Family Jewels (Central Intelligence Agency)
- Freedom of Information Act (United States)
- George Bush Center for Intelligence
- Intellipedia
- Kryptos
- National Intelligence Board
- Operation Peter Pan
- Project MKUltra
- Reagan Doctrine
- Office of Strategic Services
- Title 32 of the Code of Federal Regulations
- U.S. Army and CIA interrogation manuals
- United States and state-sponsored terrorism
- United States Department of Homeland Security
- United States Intelligence Community
- United States war crimes
- The World Factbook, published by the CIA
- List of ATF controversies
- List of FBI controversies
