= Peter Strzok =

Former FBI agent (born 1970)

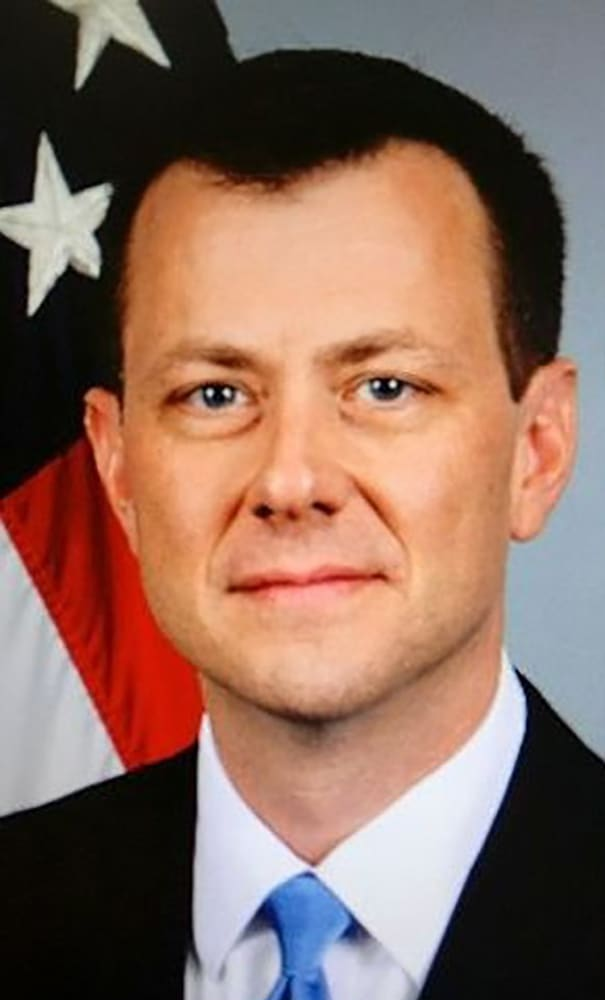
- Born: Peter Paul Strzok II; March 7, 1970 (age 56); Sault Ste. Marie, Michigan, U.S.
- Education: Georgetown University (BA, MA)
- Spouse: Melissa Hodgman

Peter Paul Strzok II (/strʌk/, like struck; born March 7, 1970) is an adjunct professor at Georgetown University and former United States Federal Bureau of Investigation (FBI) agent. During his FBI career, he was the Deputy Assistant Director of the Counterintelligence Division and led the investigation into Russian interference in the 2016 United States elections. He had previously been the chief of the division's Counterespionage Section and led the investigation into Hillary Clinton's use of a personal email server.

In June and July 2017, Strzok worked on Robert Mueller's Special Counsel investigation into any links or coordination between Donald Trump's presidential campaign and the Russian government. In July 2017, Mueller removed Strzok from the Russia investigation after partisan text message exchanges between Strzok and FBI lawyer Lisa Page were revealed, including a message in which Strzok said "we'll stop" Trump from becoming president. News of the text messages led Trump, Republican congressmen and right-wing media to speculate that Strzok participated in a conspiracy to undermine the Trump presidency. In fact Strzok's message said: "No. No he won’t. We’ll stop it” and it was in response to Lisa Page's question: “[Trump’s] not ever going to become president, right? Right?!”. The IG commented it in the report: "But our review did not find documentary or testimonial evidence that these political views directly affected the specific investigative decisions that we reviewed in this chapter."

On August 10, 2018, FBI deputy director David Bowdich fired Strzok for the text messages after the FBI's employee disciplinary office had recommended that Strzok only be suspended for 60 days and demoted. On August 6, 2019, Strzok filed a wrongful termination suit against the FBI and the U.S. Department of Justice, asking to be reinstated and awarded back pay. He asserted in the suit that his text messages were "protected political speech", and that the termination violated his First Amendment rights. In May 2024, the Justice Department agreed to settle Strzok's wrongful termination suit for $1.2 million. Strzok's 2020 book, Compromised: Counterintelligence and the Threat of Donald J. Trump, became a New York Times and Washington Post bestseller.

== Early life ==
Peter Paul Strzok II was born near Sault Ste. Marie, Michigan, to Peter Paul Strzok and Virginia Sue Harris. His father is a retired US Army Lieutenant Colonel who served in the Corps of Engineers. During a 21-year military career, his father did two tours in Vietnam, two in Saudi Arabia, and three in Iran, where Peter Strzok attended elementary school at the American School in Tehran prior to the Iranian Revolution.

The family later moved to Upper Volta, where the elder Strzok took an assignment with Catholic Relief Services after retiring from military service. One of Strzok's uncles is Father James Strzok, SJ, a Jesuit priest doing missionary work in east Africa. The Strzok family is of Polish descent.

For high school, Strzok attended St. John's Preparatory School in Minnesota, graduating in 1987. He earned a bachelor's degree from Georgetown University in 1991 as well as a master's degree in 2013. After Georgetown, Strzok served as an officer in the United States Army before leaving to join the FBI in 1996 as an intelligence research specialist. Strzok is married to Melissa Hodgman, an associate director at the U.S. Securities and Exchange Commission.

== FBI ==
A career employee with the FBI for 22 years before his firing in August 2018, Strzok had been a lead agent in the FBI's "Operation Ghost Stories" against Andrey Bezrukov and Yelena Vavilova, a Russian spy couple who were part of the Illegals Program, a network of Russian sleeper agents who were arrested in 2010. By July 2015, he was serving as the section chief of the Counterespionage Section, a subordinate section of the FBI's Counterintelligence Division.

Strzok led a team of a dozen investigators during the FBI's investigation into Hillary Clinton's use of a personal email server and assisted in the drafting of public statements for then-FBI Director James Comey. He changed the description of Clinton's actions from "grossly negligent", which could be a criminal offense, to "extremely careless". The draft was reviewed and corrected by several people and its creation was a team process. In his statement to Congress, Comey said that "no reasonable prosecutor" would bring charges based on available evidence. Later, when additional emails were discovered a few days before the election, Strzok reportedly supported reopening the Clinton investigation. He then co-wrote the letter which Comey used to inform Congress, which "reignited the email controversy in the final days" and "played a key role in a controversial FBI decision that upended Hillary Clinton's campaign."

Strzok rose to the rank of Deputy Assistant Director in the Counterintelligence Division and was the number two official within that division for investigations involving Russia. In that capacity, he led the FBI's investigation into Russian interference in the 2016 United States elections, and examined both the Steele dossier and the Russian role in the 2016 Democratic National Committee email leak. He oversaw the bureau's interviews with then-National Security Advisor Michael Flynn; Flynn later pled guilty to lying during those interviews.

In July 2017, Strzok became the most senior FBI agent working for Robert Mueller's 2017 Special Counsel investigation looking into any links or coordination between Trump's presidential campaign and the Russian government. He served in that position until August 2017, at which time he was moved to the Human Resources Branch. According to The New York Times, Strzok was "considered one of the most experienced and trusted FBI counterintelligence investigators," as well as "one of the Bureau's top experts on Russia" according to CNN.

Strzok left the investigation in late July 2017 after the discovery of personal text messages sent to Lisa Page, an FBI lawyer, during the 2016 election campaign, which criticized Trump and said he would "stop" Trump. At the request of Republicans in Congress, the Justice Department (DOJ) Inspector General (IG) began an inquiry in January 2017 into how the FBI handled investigations related to the election, and the IG announced it would issue a report by March or April 2018. The report was eventually released on June 14, 2018, after several delays.

On June 15, 2018, the day after this IG report was published, Strzok was escorted from FBI headquarters as part of the bureau's internal conduct investigations. The move put Strzok on notice that the bureau intended to fire him, though he had appeal rights that could delay such action. On June 21, 2018, Attorney General Jeff Sessions said that Strzok had lost his security clearance.

On August 10, 2018, under intense political pressure from Trump and Republicans in Congress following the IG report, FBI deputy director David Bowdich fired Strzok. The dismissal overruled a recommendation by the FBI Office of Professional Responsibility, whose head, Candice Will, had determined Strzok should only be demoted and suspended for 60 days, and Strzok's attorney cited Will's lesser disciplinary action in the course of criticizing the firing.

On August 13, a GoFundMe campaign was created by "Friends Of Special Agent Peter Strzok" to raise money for Strzok's lost income and ongoing legal costs.

=== Text messages ===
The IG's investigation examined thousands of text messages exchanged using FBI-issued cell phones between Strzok and Lisa Page, with whom he was having an extramarital affair. She was also a trial attorney on Mueller's team. The texts were sent between August 15, 2015, and December 1, 2016. At the request of the House Permanent Select Committee on Intelligence, the DOJ turned over 375 of these text messages to the House Judiciary Committee. Some of the texts disparaged then-presidential candidate Donald Trump, Chelsea Clinton, Attorney General in the Obama administration Eric Holder, former Democratic Governor Martin O'Malley, and candidate for the Democratic presidential nomination Bernie Sanders. Strzok called Trump an "idiot" in August 2015 and texted "God Hillary should win 100,000,000 - 0" after a Republican debate in March 2016.

In their messages, Strzok and Page also advocated creating a Special Counsel to investigate the Hillary Clinton email controversy, and discussed suggesting former U.S. Attorney Patrick Fitzgerald be considered for such a probe. Devlin Barrett from The Washington Post alleged Strzok and Page had been using the backdrop of discussing the Clinton investigation as a cover for their personal communications during an affair. Upon learning of the text messages, Mueller removed Strzok from the investigation. Messages released in January 2018 showed that Strzok was hesitant to join the Mueller investigation, with Page encouraging him not to do so.

Strzok's colleagues and a former Trump administration official said that Strzok had never shown any political bias. An associate of his says the political parts of the text messages were especially related to Trump's criticism of the FBI's investigation of the Clinton emails. According to FBI guidelines, agents are allowed to have and express political opinions as individuals. Former FBI and DOJ officials told The Hill that it was not uncommon for agents like Strzok to hold political opinions and still conduct an impartial investigation. Several agents asserted that Mueller had removed Strzok to protect the integrity of the special counsel's Russia investigation. Strzok was not punished following his reassignment. Defenders of Strzok and Page in the FBI said no professional misconduct between them occurred.

The decision by the DOJ to publicize the private messages in December 2017 was controversial. Statements by DOJ spokeswomen revealed that some reporters had copies of the texts even before the DOJ invited the press to review them, but the DOJ did not authorize the pre-release. Democrats on the House Judiciary Committee have asked for a review of the circumstances under which the texts were leaked to select press outlets.

A comprehensive review in February 2018 of Strzok's messages by The Wall Street Journal concluded that "texts critical of Mr. Trump represent a fraction of the roughly 7,000 messages, which stretch across 384 pages and show no evidence of a conspiracy against Mr. Trump".

The Office of Inspector General's report on the FBI's handling of the Clinton email investigation published on June 14, 2018, criticized Strzok's text messages for creating the appearance of impropriety. However, the report concluded that there was no evidence of bias in the FBI's decision not to pursue criminal charges against Clinton. The report revealed additional texts hostile to Donald Trump by Strzok. In early August 2016, after Page asked Strzok, "[Trump's] not ever going to become president, right? Right?!", Strzok responded: "No. No he won't. We'll stop it." Many Democrats believed that the FBI's actions during the 2016 presidential campaign, such as reopening the Clinton email investigation on the eve of the election and elements within the FBI telling The New York Times that there was no clear link between the Trump campaign and Russia, ended up harming the Clinton campaign and benefitting the Trump campaign.

At a July 12, 2018 public congressional hearing, Strzok denied that the personal beliefs expressed in the text messages impacted his work for the FBI. Strzok explained that a "We'll stop Trump" text message was written late at night and off-the-cuff shortly after Trump denigrated the immigrant family of a fallen American war hero, Khizr and Ghazala Khan, and that the message reflected Strzok's belief that Americans would not vote for a candidate who engaged in such "horrible, disgusting behavior". Strzok said the message "was in no way – unequivocally – any suggestion that me, the FBI, would take any action whatsoever to improperly impact the electoral process for any candidate." Strzok added that he knew of information during the 2016 presidential campaign that could have damaged Trump but that he never contemplated leaking it. Strzok also said that he criticized politicians such as Hillary Clinton and Bernie Sanders in his "blunt" text messages. Strzok claimed the investigation into him and the Republicans' related rhetoric was misguided and played into "our enemies' campaign to tear America apart".

A December 2019 report by the Justice Department inspector general acknowledged the text message from Strzok about stopping Trump, but said Strzok's actions were not taken because of bias and he did not have undue influence in launching the FBI investigation of Russian meddling in the 2016 elections.

==== Reactions ====
Strzok's personal messages to Lisa Page have been used by Republicans to attack the impartiality of Mueller's investigation into Donald Trump's alleged collusion with Russia during the election. Conservative media outlets and Republicans have used the text messages as part of an aggressive campaign to discredit the Mueller investigation and protect President Trump. Other Republicans have defended Mueller and his work, including Deputy Attorney General Rod Rosenstein who said that he would fire Mueller only if there was actual cause under DOJ regulations, and that no such cause existed. Rosenstein also praised Mueller for removing Strzok from the Russian investigation.

In 2018, President Trump falsely claimed that 19,000 text messages between Strzok and Page "were purposely & illegally deleted" and that these text messages "Would have explained whole Hoax". PolitiFact rated the claim "Pants-on-fire" false. An investigation by the Justice Department's inspector general found no evidence the messages were purposefully deleted, some from the work phones were recovered, and that the texts on their personal phones were lost when they were reset.

Some commentators on Fox News used Strzok's messages to comment negatively on the Mueller investigation. Jesse Watters said that Mueller's investigation now amounted to a coup against President Trump, if "the investigation was weaponized to destroy his presidency for partisan political purposes". Fox Business host Lou Dobbs said that the FBI and DOJ were working clandestinely to destroy the Trump presidency, and called for a "war" against the "deep state". One guest on Fox's talk and news show Outnumbered, Kevin Jackson, speculated that Strzok's messages were evidence of a plot by FBI agents to make "an assassination attempt or whatever" against President Trump, which other Fox hosts quickly contradicted and said was not "credible". Fox News figures referred to the investigation as "corrupt", "crooked" and "illegitimate", and likened the FBI's tactics to the KGB, the Soviet-era spy organization.

==== Congressional scrutiny ====
In an August 15, 2016 text message, Strzok told Page: "I want to believe the path you threw out for consideration in Andy's (Andrew McCabe, Deputy Director of the FBI) office that there's no way Trump gets elected—but I'm afraid we can't take that risk. It's like an insurance policy in the unlikely event you die before you're 40." This message attracted scrutiny from Republicans, including Senator Chuck Grassley, chairman of the United States Senate Committee on the Judiciary, who stated: "Some of these texts appear to go beyond merely expressing a private political opinion, and appear to cross the line into taking some official action to create an 'insurance policy' against a Trump presidency." Sources close to Strzok and Page told The Wall Street Journal that Strzok was not contemplating using the FBI's investigation into possible collusion between the Trump campaign and Russia to harm Trump's candidacy, but rather emphasizing the need to aggressively pursue any such leads before the election "because some of Mr. Trump's associates could land administration jobs and it was important to know if they had colluded with Russia."

On January 20, 2018, Senator Ron Johnson (R–WI) released a letter in which he stated that the FBI's technical system had failed to preserve five months' worth of texts between Strzok and Page. According to the letter, the texts in question were sent between mid-December 2016 and mid-May 2017. A Justice Department official later said that the technical lapse had affected thousands of FBI-issued phones, which failed to store text messages for periods of up to a year.

In late January 2018, a number of congressional Republicans, including Sen. Ron Johnson, asserted that they had evidence that pointed towards FBI agents working clandestinely to undermine the Trump presidency; they asserted that Strzok and Page were in a "secret society" against Trump. Congressional Republicans refused to release the evidence behind the assertion, but ABC News obtained a copy of the message that Republicans were referring to and noted that the message that refers to a "secret society" may have been made in jest. The day after his assertion that these messages demonstrated "corruption at the highest levels of the FBI" and after a copy of the messages were revealed by ABC News, Johnson walked back his comments and said that there was a "real possibility" that the messages were made in jest.

In February 2018, Johnson speculated that a text message between Strzok and Page raised questions about "the type and extent of President Obama's personal involvement" in the Clinton emails investigation. Fox News reiterated Johnson's claim that text messages between Strzok and Page suggested that former President Barack Obama was deeply involved in the investigation into Hillary Clinton's emails. Fox News spokeswoman Carly Shanahan did not answer an inquiry from CNN about whether Fox News reached out to Obama for comment. Johnson's claim was covered by various then pro-Trump websites, such as Drudge Report, Breitbart, InfoWars and The Gateway Pundit, before President Trump himself tweeted "NEW FBI TEXTS ARE BOMBSHELLS!" Other news outlets reported that the text messages were sent in September 2016, months after the Clinton emails investigation had concluded, and three days before Obama would confront Russian President Vladimir Putin about interference in the 2016 election at the G20 Hangzhou summit. Associates of Strzok and Page told The Wall Street Journal that the texts were about the FBI's investigation into Russian electoral interference. Fox News continued to report its original version of the story after the new context for the messages had been publicly proffered.

== Post-FBI ==
=== Lawsuit ===
Strzok filed a wrongful termination lawsuit against the DOJ and the FBI in federal court on August 6, 2019, asking to be reinstated and awarded back pay. He argued that the Justice Department had terminated him because of "unrelenting pressure" from Trump over his comments in private text messages. Strzok asserted in the suit that his sentiments were "protected political speech," that the DOJ had violated his privacy by releasing his texts to the media, and that his termination violated the First Amendment. He alleged that the Trump administration had "consistently tolerated and even encouraged partisan political speech by federal employees", but only if that speech lauded the president and denounced his opponents. He said his removal was "part of a broader campaign against the very principle of free speech ... initiated and led by" Trump. The Justice Department and FBI spokeswomen declined to comment. In February 2023, federal judge Amy Berman Jackson ruled that Trump and FBI director Christopher Wray could be questioned under oath regarding the suit.

His lawsuit was consolidated with that of Lisa Page, who in December 2019 sued the FBI and Justice Department, accusing them of violating the Privacy Act. In May 2024, Strzok and Page reached a tentative settlement with the Justice Department. On July 26, it was revealed that Strzok will receive $1.2 million and Lisa Page will receive $800,000.

=== Book ===
In September 2020, Houghton Mifflin Harcourt published Strzok's book, Compromised: Counterintelligence and the Threat of Donald J. Trump, which became a New York Times and Washington Post bestseller. During an NBC News interview upon release of the book, Strzok confirmed a recent report in The New York Times that the FBI had opened a broad counterintelligence investigation into Trump after the president fired FBI director James Comey in May 2017, based on concerns over Trump's "financial entanglements" with Russia. That investigation was curtailed days later by Deputy Attorney General Rod Rosenstein, giving the FBI the impression that the incipient Mueller investigation would pursue it, though Rosenstein instructed Mueller not to, effectively ending the investigation.

=== Academics ===
Since October 2020, Strzok has been an adjunct professor at Georgetown University’s School of Foreign Service.

=== Podcast ===
On February 6, 2023, the Cleanup On Aisle 45 podcast, hosted by Allison Gill, announced that Peter Strzok would be the new co-host starting on February 22, 2023. On the November 27, 2024, episode of ‘’Cleanup on Aisle 45’’ Allison Gill announced that Peter Strzok was no longer going to be the co-host for an undisclosed reason after that episode.
