= FBI Richmond Catholic memo =

2023 FBI intelligence controversy

The FBI Richmond memo

The FBI Richmond Catholic memo is an internal Federal Bureau of Investigation document from January 2023 that identified “radical traditionalist Catholics" as potential domestic violent extremists. The memo, leaked in February 2023, prompted a congressional investigation, a United States Department of Justice Office of the Inspector General review, and concerns about alleged religious profiling.

Catholic organizations, including the United States Conference of Catholic Bishops, condemned what they characterized as religious profiling while supporting legitimate counterterrorism efforts. Republican lawmakers characterized the memo as evidence of FBI targeting of religious groups, while FBI Director Christopher A. Wray and Attorney General Merrick Garland stated the memo did not meet bureau standards and was immediately withdrawn.

== Background ==
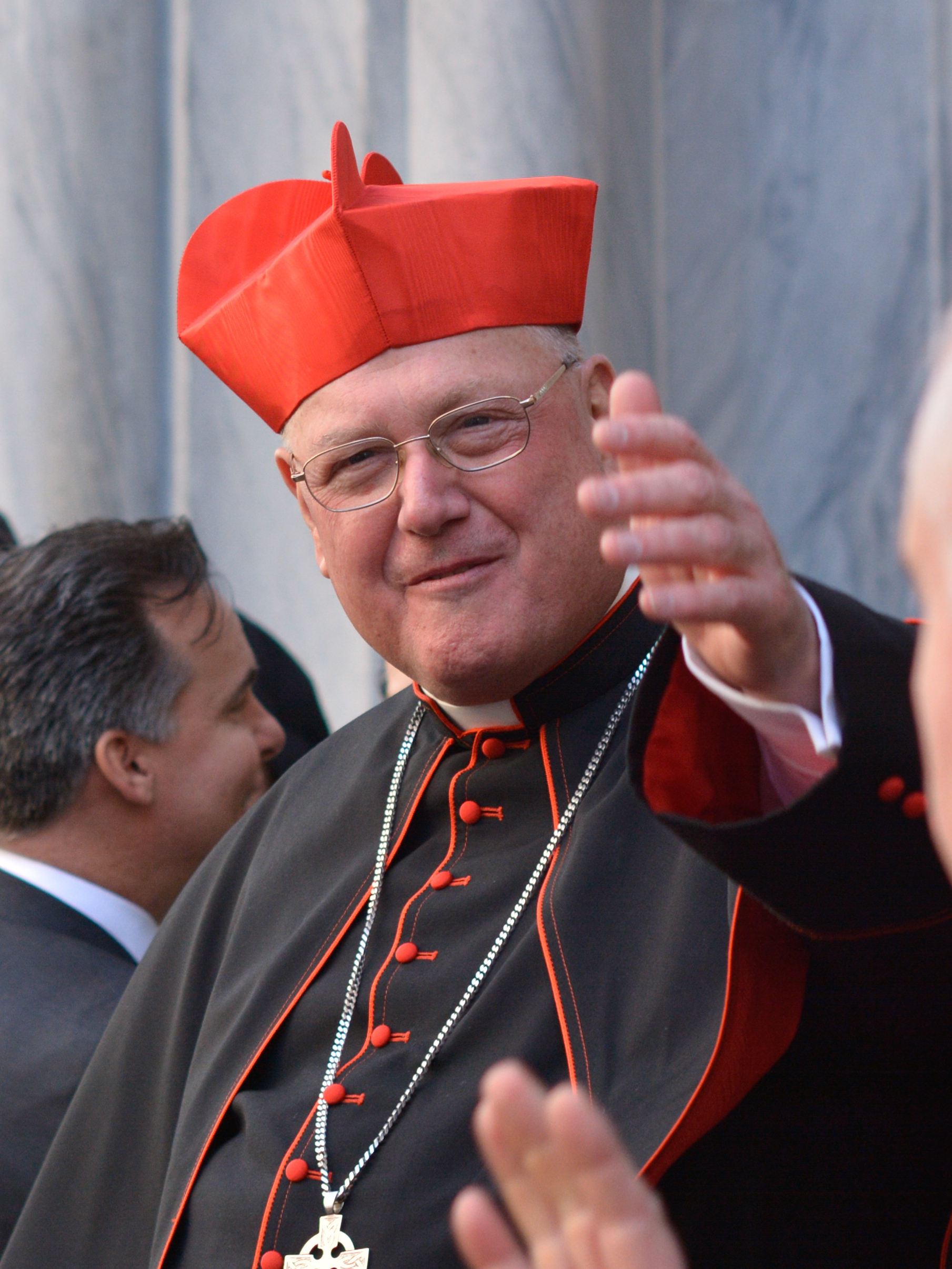
Cardinal Timothy Dolan, chairman of the Committee for Religious Liberty of the United States Conference of Catholic Bishops, in 2015

According to the Southern Poverty Law Center (SPLC), "radical traditionalist Catholics" are a subset who "may make up the largest single group of serious anti-Semites in America" and "subscribe to an ideology that is rejected by the Vatican and some 70 million mainstream American Catholics." The SPLC distinguishes this group from mainstream traditionalist Catholics who prefer the Latin Mass. Some Catholic bishops rejected the conflation of traditional liturgical preferences with extremism; Bishop Barry C. Knestout of Richmond stated that "a preference for traditional forms of worship and holding closely to the Church's teachings... does not equate with extremism," while noting that some of the groups named in the memo are not in full communion with the Church. Cardinal Timothy Dolan, chairman of the United States Conference of Catholic Bishops's Committee for Religious Liberty, called the FBI's reliance on such sourcing "dubious."

== The original memo ==
On January 23, 2023, the FBI Richmond Field Office produced an internal intelligence assessment titled "Interest of Racially or Ethnically Motivated Violent Extremists in Radical-Traditionalist Catholic Ideology Almost Certainly Presents New Mitigation Opportunities." The 11-page document had been first drafted by an analyst in late 2022 and anticipated potential threats from Catholic extremists and white nationalists leading up to the 2024 United States elections.

The memo defined "radical traditionalist Catholics" (RTCs) as typically characterized by "rejection of the Second Vatican Council as a valid church council; disdain for most of the popes elected since Vatican II, particularly Pope Francis and Pope John Paul II; and frequent adherence to anti-Semitic, anti-immigrant, anti-LGBTQ, and white supremacist ideology." The document distinguished this group from mainstream traditionalist Catholics who prefer the Traditional Latin Mass without extremist beliefs.

The memo was prompted by the FBI investigation of Xavier Lopez, arrested in November 2022 with Molotov cocktails, smoke bombs, and firearms components. Lopez, who described himself online as a "radical traditional Catholic Clerical Fascist" and expressed neo-Nazi rhetoric, had been attending an Society of Saint Pius X-affiliated church in Virginia for approximately seven months. He pleaded guilty to federal weapons charges in March 2024.

== Leak and initial reactions ==
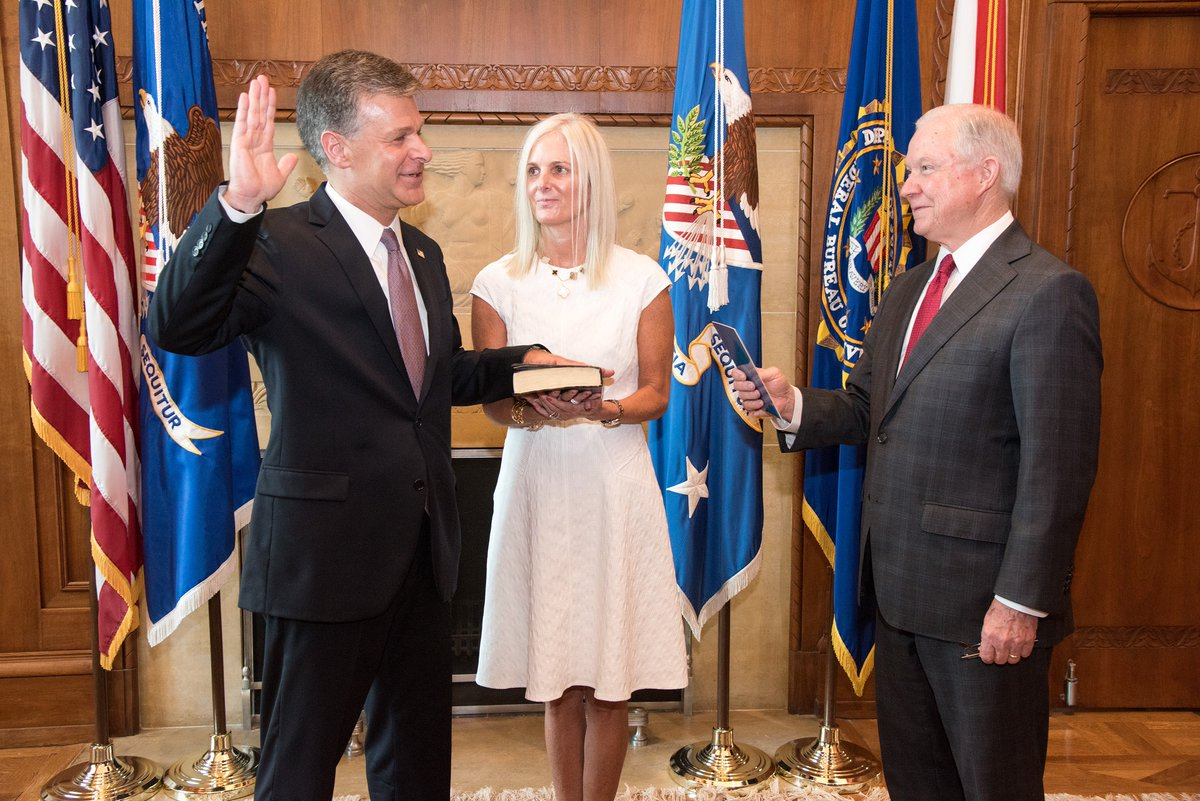
Christopher Wray being sworn in as FBI Director in 2017 by Attorney General Jeff Sessions

Former FBI Special Agent Kyle Seraphin leaked the memo to the public on February 8, 2023, through the website UncoverDC.com. Seraphin had been suspended indefinitely without pay in June 2022 after refusing the FBI's COVID vaccine mandate and raising concerns about the January 6 investigation. The FBI confirmed the memo's authenticity on February 9, 2023, stating it "does not meet the exacting standards of the FBI" and announced that headquarters had "quickly began taking action to remove the document from FBI systems."

According to the Washington Times, FBI Deputy Director Paul Abbate ordered permanent removal of the memo and all references from FBI systems on February 9–10, 2023: the same day it became public.

FBI Director Christopher Wray said he was "aghast" when he learned of the memo. He later testified that "a number of the individuals involved in writing that product in the Richmond office were themselves Catholic," arguing the memo did not signal anti-Catholic bias within the bureau. Attorney General Merrick Garland called it "appalling" during March 1, 2023 Senate testimony, stating "our department protects all religions and all ideologies, it does not have any bias against any religion of any kind."

Bishop Barry Knestout of the Diocese of Richmond issued a statement on February 13, 2023, calling the memo "troubling and offensive to all communities of faith" and noting that "a preference for traditional forms of worship and holding closely to the Church's teachings on marriage, family, human sexuality, and the dignity of the human person does not equate with extremism."

On February 10, 2023, Virginia Attorney General Jason Miyares led 19 other state attorneys general—all Republicans—in sending a letter to Director Wray and Attorney General Garland stating that "anti-Catholic bigotry appears to be festering in the FBI, and the Bureau is treating Catholics as potential terrorists because of their beliefs."

== Congressional investigation ==
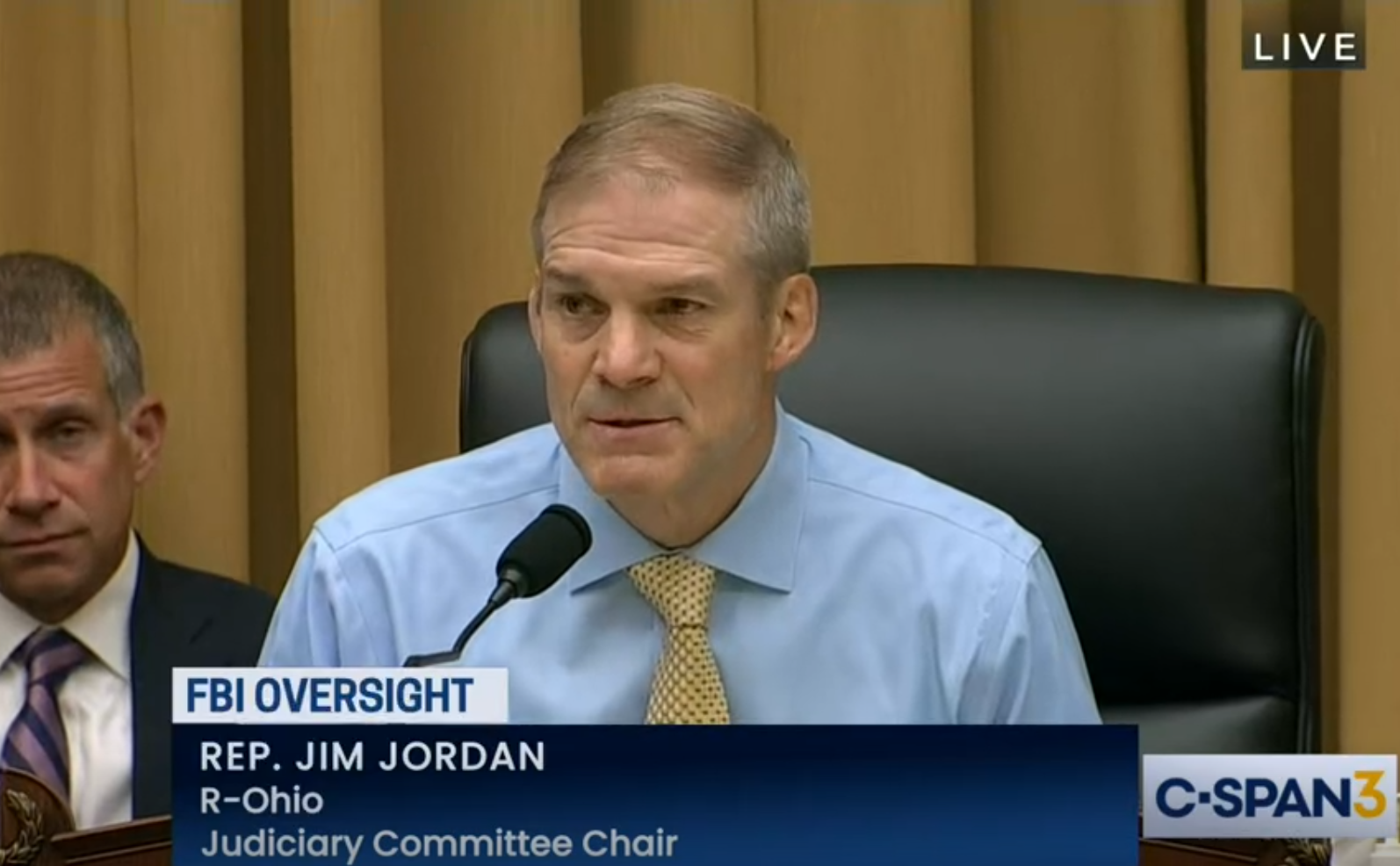
Representative Jim Jordan (R-Ohio), Chairman of the House Judiciary Committee, speaking at the FBI oversight hearing on July 12, 2023

House Judiciary Committee Chairman Jim Jordan and Subcommittee on the Constitution and Limited Government Chairman Mike Johnson launched an investigation in February 2023. Jordan demanded the FBI produce all documents related to the memo by March 2, 2023, citing concerns that the bureau had "singled out Americans who are pro-life, pro-family, and support the biological basis for sex and gender distinction as potential domestic terrorists."

The FBI's initial response on March 23, 2023, consisted of only 18 pages with significant redactions. On April 10, 2023, Jordan issued a subpoena to Director Wray compelling further document production, stating: "We now know that the FBI relied on at least one undercover agent to produce its analysis, and that the FBI proposed that its agents engage in outreach to Catholic parishes to develop sources among the clergy and church leadership to inform on Americans practicing their faith."

Jordan accused the FBI of seeking to use local religious organizations as "new avenues for tripwire and source development." In July 2023, he threatened to hold Wray in contempt of Congress if the bureau did not comply with the subpoenas, writing that the FBI's response had been "wholly inadequate and has materially impeded the committee's oversight efforts."

At a contentious hearing before the House Judiciary Committee in July 2023, Wray vehemently rejected the claim that the bureau had targeted Catholics. Jordan alleged during the hearing that the FBI had "engaged in the weaponization of the government against the American people."

=== File deletion ===
According to the House Judiciary Committee report and Senator Chuck Grassley, Deputy Director Paul Abbate ordered permanent removal of the memo and all references from FBI systems on February 9–10, 2023, following its public leak. The FBI's Operational Technology Division was also directed to remove an Excel document listing users who had accessed the memo.

In January 2024, Senator Grassley and 15 Republican senators sent a letter to Director Wray questioning the decision to permanently delete files rather than simply remove the memo from distribution, raising concerns about compliance with federal document retention requirements and obstruction of congressional oversight. According to the Washington Times, the FBI told Grassley's staff in August 2024 that deleted files could be recovered, but no such files were subsequently produced.

=== June 2025 releases ===
In June 2025, Senate Judiciary Committee Chairman Chuck Grassley released FBI records and a letter to FBI Director Kash Patel alleging the memo had been "widely distributed" within the bureau before it was retracted, including in consultations with agents in the Louisville, Portland, and Milwaukee field offices. According to Grassley's office, the memo was distributed to over 1,000 FBI employees nationwide before its public disclosure, contradicting Wray's characterization of it as "a single product."

The records showed at least 13 additional FBI documents and five attachments used "radical traditionalist Catholic" terminology and relied on SPLC reporting. Patel acknowledged Grassley's letter by reposting on X a message calling him "a key partner in the Bureau's commitment to transparency." Grassley stated that he was "determined to get to the bottom of the Richmond memo, and of the FBI's contempt for oversight in the last administration."

== DOJ Inspector General review ==
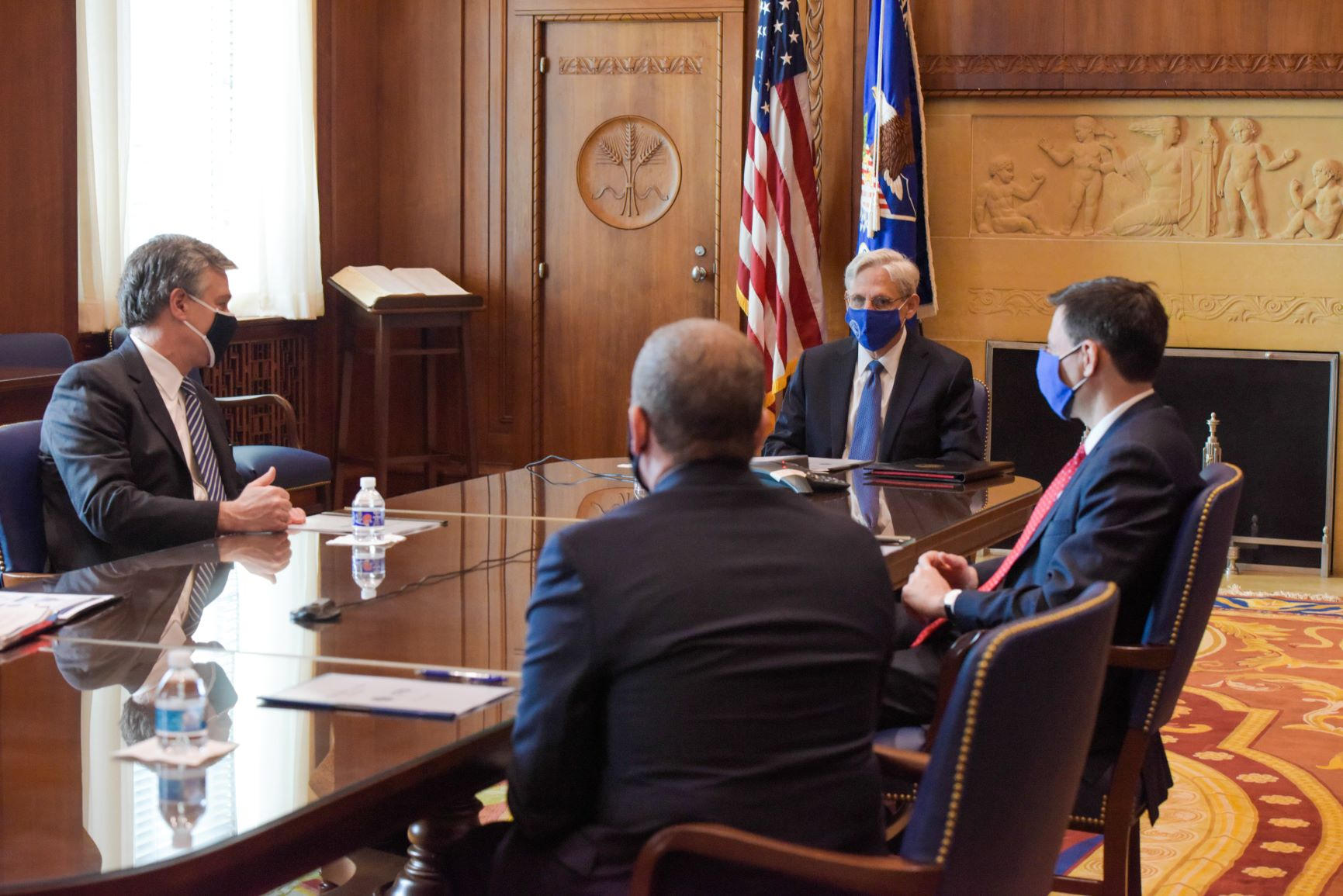
Attorney General Merrick Garland, whose Inspector General conducted the mandated review, with FBI Director Christopher Wray

The Intelligence Authorization Act for Fiscal Year 2024, signed into law on December 22, 2023, mandated a 120-day review by DOJ Inspector General Michael E. Horowitz. The IG released his report on April 18, 2024.

The IG's 10-page report found no evidence of malicious intent or religious bias while documenting professional failures. Horowitz found "no evidence" that "anyone ordered or directed" the investigation of Catholics based on religion, and determined there was no "malicious intent" or "improper purpose" behind the memo. However, the report concluded the memo "failed to adhere to analytic tradecraft standards," "evinced errors in professional judgment," and "lacked sufficient evidence or articulable support" for the claimed relationship between RMVEs and radical traditional Catholic ideology.

Horowitz found that the memo "incorrectly conflated the subjects' religious views with their RMVE activities", creating "the appearance that the FBI had inappropriately considered religious beliefs and affiliation as a basis for conducting investigative activity." The report stated analysts "improperly conflated the religious beliefs of activists with the likelihood they would engage in domestic terrorism" and reflected "a lack of training and awareness" concerning proper domestic terrorism terminology.

Regarding investigative techniques, the IG found that FBI Richmond used a confidential human source at the church and interviewed the priest and choir director "to obtain information about Defendant A and not to prepare the Richmond DP or collect intelligence more generally." Both analysts denied targeting anyone for practicing faith, with Analyst 1 stating accusations of anti-Catholic bias were "patently false" and the intent was "to promote outreach to Catholic Church...to protect that community from potentially violent actors."

Senator Grassley responded that "the most important part of this report is what's not in it, rather than what is." Catholic League President William Donohue called the IG report "overly vague, ambiguous, and littered with contradictions."

== FBI response and policy changes ==
The FBI implemented several policy changes in response to the controversy. According to The New York Times, Director Wray tightened approval requirements for intelligence products after the memo's release. In 2023, the bureau updated its policy and heightened the approval process for intelligence products implicating religious liberties, requiring critical examination of third-party sources for "access, reliability, bias, and other factors affecting the credibility of all sources cited in analytic products." Enhanced review protocols were established for "sensitive intelligence products," and approval requirements were changed for intelligence products discussing religious matters.

After Kash Patel became director in 2025, the FBI adjusted its "source recruitment structure" to prevent placing sources in houses of worship unless they identified a specific threat. Patel stated: "We will not use sources at this FBI to investigate and cull information just for the sake of culling information in houses of worship." According to the Washington Times, all employees involved in drafting, reviewing, and approving the memorandum were formally admonished under Director Wray, with admonishments placed in annual performance reviews affecting their compensation. No terminations occurred under Wray's leadership.

The FBI Inspection Division, which completed its internal review in April 2023, found employees violated both FBI standards and analytic tradecraft standards set by the Office of the Director of National Intelligence, but determined they had not engaged in "intentional or bad faith conduct." Director Wray testified multiple times that he was "aghast" upon learning of the memo and ordered it immediately withdrawn. However, according to The Washington Times, congressional investigators found the FBI's internal Inspection Division review was completed in April 2023—before Wray's July 12, 2023 testimony to Congress where he claimed the review was "ongoing" and refused to identify who authored and approved the memo. Patel testified in September 2025 that there had been "terminations" and "resignations" related to the memo, although specific numbers were not disclosed. Patel testified the FBI made "personnel changes" and committed to full cooperation with congressional oversight.

On March 9, 2023, Special Agent in Charge Stanley Meador met with Catholic Diocese of Richmond leadership, including Bishop Knestout, the Vicar General, general counsel, and a Cardinal of the Catholic Church. He offered "an apology on behalf of the field office for the negative attention" but not an apology for the memo's content. No public apology was issued by FBI Headquarters or Director Wray.

== Reactions ==
=== Catholic organizations ===
Catholic organizations condemned the memo while supporting legitimate law enforcement efforts against actual extremism. The United States Conference of Catholic Bishops, through Cardinal Timothy Dolan, called for federal authorities to "take appropriate measures to ensure the problematic aspects of the memo do not recur." The Catholic League, led by President Bill Donohue, wrote 10 news releases on the subject in 2023 and three in 2024. Donohue stated in June 2025: "We have known for years about an anti-Catholic cell group in the FBI that was operative under President Biden."

=== Congressional response ===
Republican congressional members characterized the incident as FBI "weaponization" against Catholics and evidence of anti-Catholic bias in federal law enforcement. In a September 2023 House Judiciary Committee hearing, Representative Jeff Van Drew asked Garland: "Do you agree that traditional Catholics are violent extremists?" Garland responded: "I have no idea what 'traditional' means here... The idea that someone with my family background would discriminate against any religion is so outrageous, so absurd." Van Drew pressed further, stating "It was your FBI that did this... sending undercover agents into Catholic churches." Garland acknowledged "Catholics are not extremists" but said he did not know whether anyone had been fired for producing the memo.

Senator Josh Hawley confronted Wray in December 2023 testimony, asking: "Are Catholic churches breeding grounds for domestic terrorism?" and stating "you have mobilized your division, the most powerful law enforcement division in the world, against traditionalist Catholics." Senator Ted Cruz and Senator Mike Lee also had exchanges with Wray during hearings.

Democratic congressional members largely defended the FBI and characterized Republican concerns as politically motivated. Senate Judiciary Committee Chairman Dick Durbin stated during the December 5, 2023 hearing: "I'm troubled that the FBI is facing baseless claims that you have been weaponized for political purposes and dangerous calls to defund the agency." Senator Laphonza Butler, a former president of abortion-rights advocacy group EMILY's List, refused to discuss the Catholic memo issue and focused her questioning on threats against abortion clinics.

=== Media coverage ===
Media coverage of the controversy varied significantly across outlets. The New York Times emphasized the Inspector General's "no bias found" conclusion, characterized the memo as focused on "self-identified Catholic extremists" rather than all Catholics, and presented it as part of broader Republican complaints about FBI "weaponization." NPR characterized Jordan's references to "Catholics are called radicals" as among "his party's talking points that the FBI is out to get them."

The Washington Times characterized it as the "anti-Catholic memo" showing FBI "targeting" of Catholics, emphasized the "Biden-era FBI" framing, and highlighted cover-up allegations and contradictions in Wray's testimony. The Wall Street Journal editorial board criticized the memo in February 2023, and following the August 2023 revelation that multiple field offices were involved, wrote it was "hard not to conclude that the bureau was trying to hide the breadth of its Catholics-as-radicals investigation."

MSNBC columnist Sarah Posner characterized the controversy as Jordan's "new myth" and a "smear campaign," arguing that Republicans were using "a single internal intelligence memo" to "discredit law enforcement" as criminal investigations against President Trump intensified. Posner stated that both Wray and Garland had "unequivocally denounced the memo" under oath and claimed that the net result was that "one misguided field office has been schooled on bureau policy."

Catholic media offered varied perspectives. Catholic News Agency provided detailed coverage featuring statements from Catholic leaders while supporting law enforcement's role in combating actual extremism. America, the Jesuit magazine, quoted former FBI field office head Kathleen McChesney, who said the memo was "too broad" and should not have relied primarily on secondary sources, but emphasized it "does not impugn the work of the entire bureau." Former FBI agent Phil Andrew, himself a Catholic who later led an anti-violence initiative for the Archdiocese of Chicago, condemned "any attempt to use the memo as a tool to tear down the work of the FBI."

Commonweal writer Paul Moses offered a more nuanced assessment, observing that the unredacted memo revealed the FBI "was not 'targeting' Society of Saint Pious X churches; it was trying to enlist their help to deal with a dangerous situation" involving Xavier Lopez. Moses criticized the memo's "clumsy" ideological framing but acknowledged that Lopez — who possessed homemade firebombs and was ranked fourth nationally in FBI indicators for mobilization of violence — represented a genuine threat. Moses wrote that "it's jarring to see a government document that defines religious belief based on ideology," adding that the reaction had "mostly been defensiveness, denial of the danger, and deepened resentment."

== See also ==
- Arctic Frost investigation
- Crossfire Hurricane (FBI investigation)
- Freedom of religion in the United States
