= Robert Kissane =

American law enforcement officer

Deputy Director of the Federal Bureau of Investigation
- Acting
- In office January 20, 2025 – March 17, 2025
- President: Donald Trump
- Director: Brian Driscoll (acting); Kash Patel
- Preceded by: Paul Abbate
- Succeeded by: Dan Bongino

Personal details
- Education: United States Military Academy (BS); University of Colorado (MBA)

Military service
- Allegiance: United States
- Branch/service: United States Army

Robert Christopher Kissane is an American law enforcement official who served as the acting deputy director of the Federal Bureau of Investigation from January 20 to March 17, 2025.

== Education ==
Kissane attended Mount Saint Michael Academy, before studying systems engineering at the United States Military Academy. He later obtained a Master of Business Administration from the University of Colorado.

== Career ==
=== Early career ===
Kissane previously served in the United States Army, and also worked in banking and finance.

=== FBI ===
Kissane joined the FBI as a special agent in 2003 and has spent the majority of his career in the New York field office. He was firstly assigned to investigate violent crime as a member of the New York Joint Bank Robbery Task Force. He transferred to the New York JTTF and investigated terrorist threats to the United States from East Africa. He was promoted to a supervisory special agent in 2014.

In 2017, Kissane was appointed the chief of a unit in the counterterrorism division that focused on terrorism coming from the Arabian Peninsula and Africa. He returned to New York as an assistant special agent in charge in 2020, and in 2021 was appointed chief of a China operations section in the counterintelligence division. In January 2023, Director Christopher Wray appointed Kissane the special agent in charge of the counterterrorism division in the FBI New York field office.

On January 20, 2025, President Donald Trump appointed Kissane the acting deputy director of the Federal Bureau of Investigation.

He was supposed to work with Brian Driscoll as Deputy Director of the FBI working underneath him. However, following the inauguration of Donald Trump in January 2025, Driscoll accidentally became acting director of the FBI because the White House website "incorrectly listed" him as acting director and Kissane as deputy director. "Instead of fixing the error, the pair swapped their temporary FBI roles," according to The Wall Street Journal.

On February 23, 2025, President Trump announced on Truth Social that Dan Bongino would be the next deputy director of the FBI. Bongino took office on March 17.

== Awards ==
Kissane received the FBI director's award for excellence in the human intelligence program for his role in the team that located an operative wanted for the USS Cole bombing.

Government offices
Preceded by Paul Abbate	Deputy Director of the Federal Bureau of Investigation; Acting; 2025	Succeeded by Dan Bongino
