= Jim Jordan =

American politician (born 1964)

- Jordan in 2021

House Minority Leader-designate
- Assuming office January 3, 2027
- Whip: Tom Emmer (designate)
- Succeeding: Hakeem Jeffries

Member of the U.S. House of Representatives from Ohio's 4th district
- Incumbent
- Assumed office January 3, 2007
- Preceded by: Mike Oxley
House positions
Leader-elect of the House Republican Conference
Assuming office January 3, 2027
Succeeding	Mike Johnson
Chair of the House Judiciary Committee
Incumbent
Assumed office January 3, 2023
Preceded by	Jerry Nadler
Ranking Member of the House Judiciary Committee
In office March 12, 2020 – January 3, 2023
Preceded by	Doug Collins
Succeeded by	Jerry Nadler
Ranking Member of the House Oversight Committee
In office March 31, 2020 – June 29, 2020
Preceded by	Mark Meadows
Succeeded by	James Comer
In office January 3, 2019 – March 12, 2020
Preceded by	Elijah Cummings
Succeeded by	Mark Meadows
Chair of the House Freedom Caucus
In office October 1, 2015 – January 3, 2017
Preceded by	Position established
Succeeded by	Mark Meadows
Chair of the Republican Study Committee
In office January 3, 2011 – January 3, 2013
Preceded by	Tom Price
Succeeded by	Steve Scalise

Member of the Ohio Senate from the 12th district
- In office January 3, 2001 – December 31, 2006
- Preceded by: Robert R. Cupp
- Succeeded by: Keith Faber

Member of the Ohio House of Representatives from the 85th district
- In office January 3, 1995 – December 31, 2000
- Preceded by: Jim Davis
- Succeeded by: Derrick Seaver

Personal details
- Born: James Daniel Jordan; February 17, 1964 (age 62) Troy, Ohio, U.S.
- Party: Republican
- Spouse: Polly Jordan (m. 1985)
- Children: 4
- Relatives: Jarrod Uthoff (son-in-law)
- Education: University of Wisconsin, Madison (BS); Ohio State University (MA); Capital University (JD)
- Awards: Presidential Medal of Freedom (2021)
- Website: House website Campaign website
- Jordan's voice Jordan honors Neil Armstrong on the 50th anniversary of the Apollo 11 moon landing. Recorded July 18, 2019

Jim Jordan
Medal record

Collegiate Wrestling

Representing the Wisconsin Badgers

NCAA Division I Championships
Gold medal – first place	1985 Oklahoma City	134 lb
Gold medal – first place	1986 Iowa City	134 lb

James Daniel Jordan (born February 17, 1964) is an American politician, college wrestler, and former wrestling coach who has served in the U.S. House of Representatives as the representative for Ohio's 4th congressional district since 2007. Previously, he served in the Ohio Senate from 2001 to 2006 and the Ohio House of Representatives from 1995 to 2000. A member of the Republican Party, he will be Republican House Minority Leader in the upcoming 120th Congress and is the Republican nominee for the election of a new Speaker.

Jordan is a two-time NCAA national champion wrestler and a former college wrestling coach. He was first elected to Congress in 2006. In Congress, Jordan helped start the House Freedom Caucus. He served as its first chair from 2015 to 2017 and has been its vice chair since 2017. Jordan was a prominent critic of Speaker of the House John Boehner, who resigned under Freedom Caucus pressure in 2015. He was the ranking member of the House Oversight Committee from 2019 to 2020, when he left to become the ranking member of the House Judiciary Committee, of which he became chair in 2023.

Described by media sources as a far-right politician, Jordan is a close ally of President Donald Trump. During Trump's first presidency, Jordan sought to discredit investigations into Russian interference in the 2016 election and staged a sit-in to prevent an impeachment inquiry hearing over the Trump–Zelenskyy telephone controversy. After Joe Biden won the 2020 presidential election, Jordan supported lawsuits to challenge the election results and voted against certification of the Electoral College results. In 2021, Trump awarded Jordan the Presidential Medal of Freedom.

Jordan sought to become House Speaker in October 2023, but withdrew his nomination after failing to win election in three rounds of voting. After the 2026 midterm elections led House Speaker Mike Johnson to step down as leader of the House Republican Conference, Jordan defeated outgoing majority leader Steve Scalise to become minority leader-designate for the upcoming 120th Congress.

== Early life and education ==
James Daniel Jordan was born on February 17, 1964, in Troy, Ohio, to Shirley and John Jordan. His father worked at a General Motors plant and coached Jordan's baseball and wrestling teams. His mother ran a housecleaning business. He was raised in Champaign County, Ohio. and attended Graham High School. He won wrestling state championships all four years he was in high school and compiled a 156–1 win–loss record.

After high school, Jordan went to the University of Wisconsin–Madison, where he became a two-time NCAA Division I wrestling champion. Jordan won the 1985 and 1986 NCAA championship matches in the 134-pound (61 kg) weight class, defeating future multi-time World and Olympic champion John Smith in the former. He lost the 126–137-pound (57–62 kg) featherweight semifinal match at the 1988 U.S. Olympic wrestling trials against Smith, failing to qualify for the Olympic team in freestyle wrestling. Jordan graduated from Wisconsin in 1986 with a bachelor's degree in economics.

Jordan later earned a master's degree in education from Ohio State University and received a Juris Doctor degree from the Capital University Law School in 2001. In a 2018 interview, Jordan said he never took the bar examination.

== Early career ==
=== Coaching career ===
After graduating, Jordan served as an assistant coach with the Ohio State University's wrestling program from 1987 to 1995.

==== Team's abuse scandal ====
Richard Strauss was the wrestling team physician during Jordan's tenure. Strauss died by suicide in 2005. In April 2018, Ohio State University began an independent investigation into allegations of sexual misconduct by Strauss. The report concluded that Strauss had committed sexual abuse against 177 student-patients. The majority of abuse (143 victims) was categorized as genital fondling associated with medically unnecessary genital or rectal examinations. Of the 177, 153 were student-athletes, of which a plurality (48) were members of the men's wrestling team.

Several involved persons have stated that Jordan surely knew of Strauss's criminal misconduct but did not report it. While at least one victim has named Jordan as knowledgeable of accusations against Strauss, Head Coach Russ Hellickson said he may not have known about the abuse. A spokesperson for Jordan denied the allegation, saying that Jordan "never saw or heard of any abuse, and if he had, he would have dealt with it". No wrestlers have accused Jordan himself of sexual misconduct, but four former wrestlers named him as a defendant in a lawsuit against the university. Jordan has denied any wrongdoing and has described his accusers as "pawns in a political plot".

=== Ohio General Assembly ===
Jordan left coaching to run for the Ohio House of Representatives. He was first elected in 1994 and represented the 85th district for three terms.

In 2000, Jordan ran for the Ohio Senate and defeated independent candidate Jack Kaffenberger with 88% of the vote. He defeated Kaffenberger again in 2004, receiving 79% of the vote.

== U.S. House of Representatives ==
=== Elections ===
Jordan represents Ohio's 4th congressional district, a primarily urban district, which includes Lima, Mansfield, Marysville, and Marion, and parts of Columbus.

Jordan first ran for Congress in 2006, where he won the Republican primary for the 4th district after 26-year incumbent Mike Oxley announced his retirement. Jordan defeated Democratic nominee Rick Siferd in the general election with 60% of the vote.

Jordan was reelected in 2008, defeating Democratic nominee Mike Carroll with 65% of the vote. In 2010, he was again reelected, defeating Democrat Doug Litt and Libertarian Donald Kissick with 71% of the vote. Jordan was reelected in 2012, 2014, 2016, 2018, 2020, 2022, 2024, and 2026.

=== Tenure ===
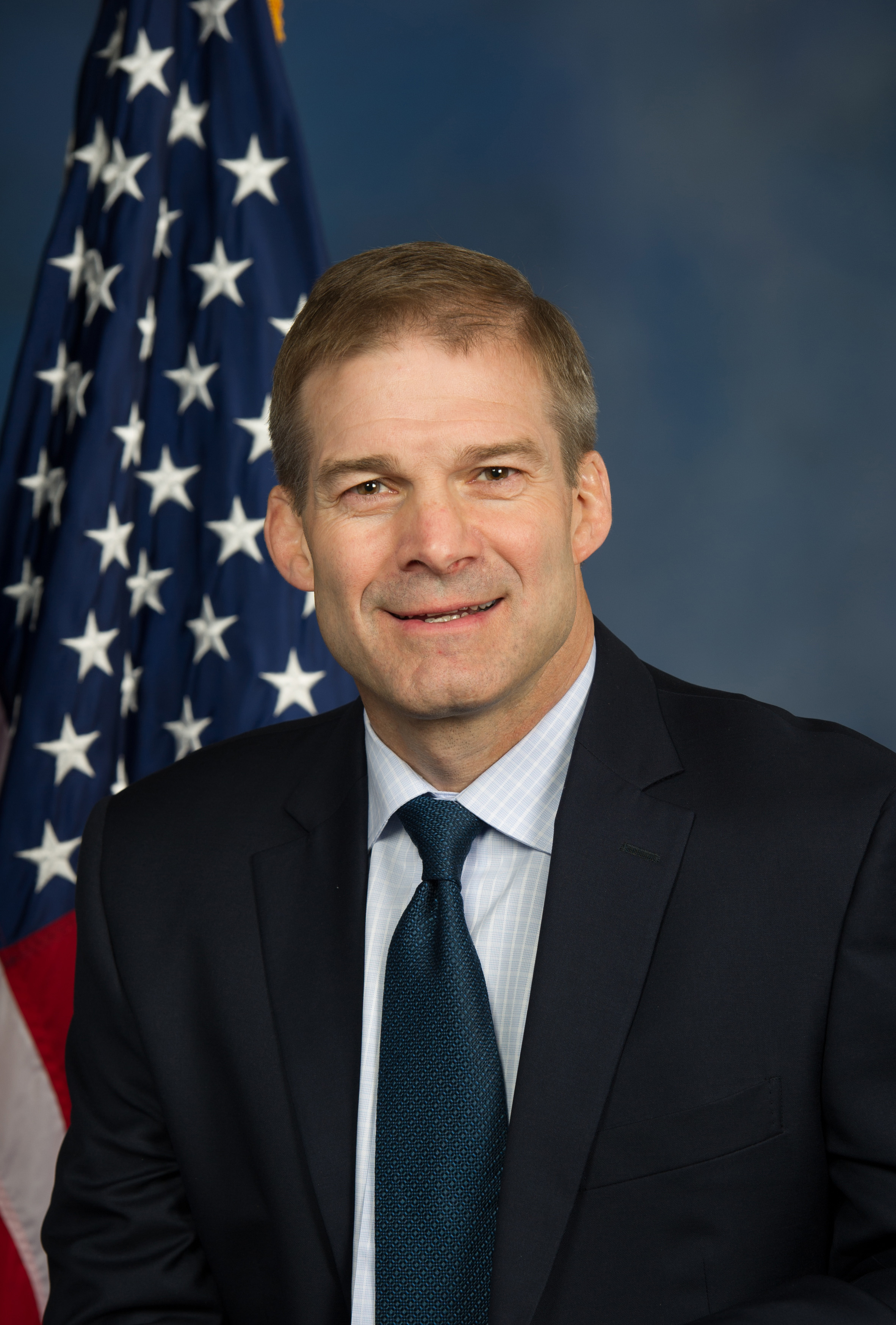
Jordan during the 114th Congress

Jordan chaired the Republican Study Committee during the 112th Congress, while turning down a position on the Appropriations Committee. During the 2013 US government shutdown, he was described by Rolling Stone as the committee's most powerful member. That group was the primary proponent and executor of the Republican congressional strategy to bring about a government shutdown in order to force changes in the Patient Protection and Affordable Care Act, also known as Obamacare.

Jordan received a vote for Speaker of the United States House of Representatives in the 113th Congress from a fellow right-wing conservative, Tea Party Caucus chairman Tim Huelskamp. Jordan received two votes for Speaker during the 114th Congress. On July 26, 2018, he announced his bid for Speaker after Paul Ryan retired; his campaign ended when Democrats took the majority in the House. Subsequently, Jordan campaigned for House minority leader. Former Ohio state representative Capri Cafaro said that Jordan "is someone who has built a reputation as an attack dog, someone who is media savvy, someone who is a stalwart supporter of the president and who has the skill necessary to take the lead for the GOP". He lost his bid to Kevin McCarthy in a 159–43 vote. In 2023, Jordan returned to consideration for the speakership after McCarthy failed to win it after three rounds of voting. And in October of the same year, he briefly held the GOP nomination for speaker.

Jordan was the ranking member of the House Oversight Committee from January 2019 to June 2020, with a brief interlude in March 2020. (Note: In March 2020, he briefly left his position on the Committee on Oversight and Government Reform and replaced Doug Collins on the United States House Committee on the Judiciary. Collins was required to step down from the committee post after launching his bid in the 2020–21 United States Senate special election in Georgia. Mark Meadows replaced Jordan on the House Committee on Oversight and Government Reform, but Jordan returned to the position 18 days later, when Meadows become President Trump's chief of staff.) He was replaced by James Comer.

Jordan's district has been redrawn over time to minimize urban area (such as Toledo, Columbus or Cleveland) and increase rural area; it now stretches from Lake Erie nearly to Dayton. In May 2019, a three-judge federal panel ruled Ohio's congressional district map unconstitutional due to partisan gerrymandering and ordered Ohio to create a new map in time for the 2020 election. But after the U.S. Supreme Court ruled in Rucho v. Common Cause that courts could not review allegations of gerrymandering, the district boundaries were not to change until maps were redrawn in 2022.

In December 2021, the House Select Committee on the January 6 Attack released the partial contents of a text message an unnamed lawmaker sent to White House chief of staff Mark Meadows before the scheduled final certification of presidential electors on January 6, 2021. The excerpt read: "On January 6, 2021, Vice President Mike Pence, as President of the Senate, should call out all the electoral votes that he believes are unconstitutional as no electoral votes at all." The day after the release, Jordan acknowledged sending the message, but said he had merely forwarded it after receiving it from attorney Joseph Schmitz. Both Jordan and Meadows asserted that the committee had altered the context of the excerpt by misplacing a period.

==== Freedom Caucus ====
During the 114th Congress, Jordan and eight other members of Congress founded the House Freedom Caucus, a bloc of conservatives working "to advance an agenda of limited constitutional government" in Congress. He served as the group's first chair. The caucus was ultimately credited with pushing Speaker John Boehner into retirement.

==== Legislation ====
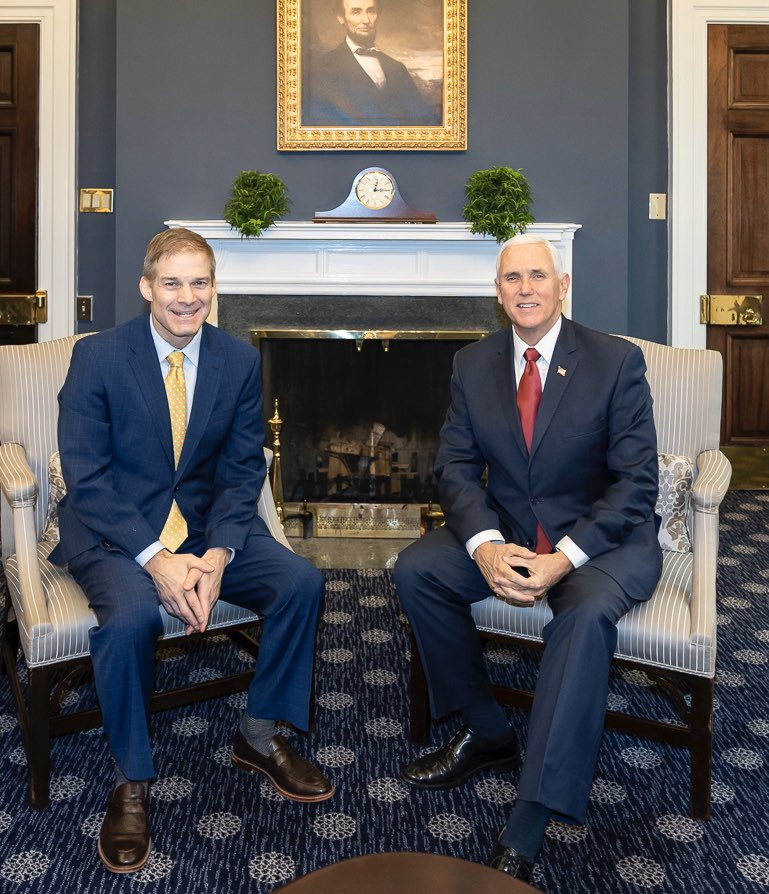
Jordan with Vice President Mike Pence

As of 2023, Jordan, who has served in the House of Representatives for over 16 years, has never sponsored a bill that later became law.

On May 2, 2014, Jordan introduced House Resolution 565, "Calling on Attorney General Eric H. Holder, Jr., to appoint a special counsel to investigate the targeting of conservative nonprofit groups by the Internal Revenue Service". It passed on May 7, 2014. Holder, who had previously been found to be in contempt of Congress, failed to appoint a special counsel to investigate the alleged procedural abuses of IRS employees, including Lois Lerner.

In March 2017, Jordan criticized the newly introduced American Health Care Act, the Republican replacement bill for the Patient Protection and Affordable Care Act, calling it an unacceptable form of "Obamacare Lite". On May 4, 2017, he voted to pass a revised version of the legislation.

On June 13, 2018, Jordan and Representative Mark Meadows filed a resolution to compel the Department of Justice to provide certain documents to Congress relating to the ongoing congressional investigations of Russian interference in the 2016 election. The resolution asserted that the DOJ was stonewalling congressional oversight and sought to give the DOJ seven days from its enactment to turn over documents related to both Deputy Attorney General Rod Rosenstein's appointment of Special Counsel Robert Mueller as well as various decisions made by the FBI during the 2016 presidential election. Jordan issued a press release that stated:

This resolution gives the DOJ seven days to turn over the documents that they owe Congress. Rod Rosenstein threatened congressional staff. When the bully picks on your little brother, you have to respond. It's time for House Leadership to stand up and pass this resolution.

On July 25, 2018, Jordan and Meadows introduced articles of impeachment against Rosenstein, whom they accused of "intentionally withholding embarrassing documents and information, knowingly hiding material investigative information from Congress, various abuses of the FISA process, and failure to comply with congressional subpoenas". Jordan stated that impeachment was necessary because:

The DOJ is keeping information from Congress. Enough is enough. It's time to hold Mr. Rosenstein accountable for blocking Congress's constitutional oversight role.

Jordan and Representative Warren Davidson were the only members of Ohio's congressional delegation and two of 60 members of Congress to vote in October 2019 against a bipartisan resolution that passed the House 354–60 condemning Trump's unilateral withdrawal of U.S. military forces from Syria.

==== Speaker elections ====
Despite his support for Kevin McCarthy in the 2023 Speaker of the House of Representatives election, including nominating McCarthy on the second ballot, Jordan was nominated on the second ballot by Representative Matt Gaetz. He received 19 votes, enough to deny McCarthy the speakership in the second round. Jordan was nominated again on the third ballot by Chip Roy. He won 20 votes in the third ballot, with Byron Donalds switching from McCarthy to Jordan. This was enough to necessitate a fourth ballot, but Jordan got no votes on ballots 4 through 11, as all his supporters switched to Donalds. On the 12th ballot, Gaetz nominated Jordan again. He received four votes, enough to necessitate a 13th ballot when combined with the three for Kevin Hern. He was not nominated on the 13th or 14th ballot, but received six and two votes on each, respectively.

After the House removed McCarthy from the speakership on October 3, 2023, Jordan launched a bid for the speakership. His speakership bid was endorsed by Donald Trump. On October 11, Jordan was defeated by Steve Scalise for the Republican nomination for the speakership. However, after Scalise withdrew a day later after failing to consolidate the necessary votes, Jordan launched a second bid for the speakership and defeated Austin Scott for the Republican nomination. Jordan subsequently failed to win the speakership in the first two rounds of the House vote, garnering only 200 of the 217 votes needed to win in the first vote and only 199 votes in the second. A third round of voting occurred on October 20, 2023, where he garnered only 194 votes of the 217 votes needed to win in the third round. Following his third defeat, Jordan intended to continue his bid for the speakership, but instead was subsequently removed from his position as Speaker-designate by his Republican colleagues in a secret ballot.

=== House Minority Leader ===
Jordan ran for House Republican Leader to succeed Mike Johnson, who wouldn't run again. He faced and defeated Steve Scalise in the caucus vote by 106 votes.

=== Committee assignments ===
- Committee on the Judiciary (chairman)
  - Select Subcommittee on the Weaponization of the Federal Government (chairman)
- Committee on Oversight and Government Reform
  - Subcommittee on Health Care, Benefits, and Administrative Rules
  - Subcommittee on Government Operations
  - Select Subcommittee on the Coronavirus Crisis
- House Select Committee on the Events Surrounding the 2012 Terrorist Attack in Benghazi (2014–2016)
- Committee on Intelligence (temporary)

=== Caucus memberships ===
- Freedom Caucus (Chair from 2015–2017)
- Republican Study Committee (Chair from 2011–2013)
- Congressional Constitution Caucus
- Congressional Western Caucus
- U.S.-Japan Caucus
- Campus Free Speech Caucus

== Political positions ==
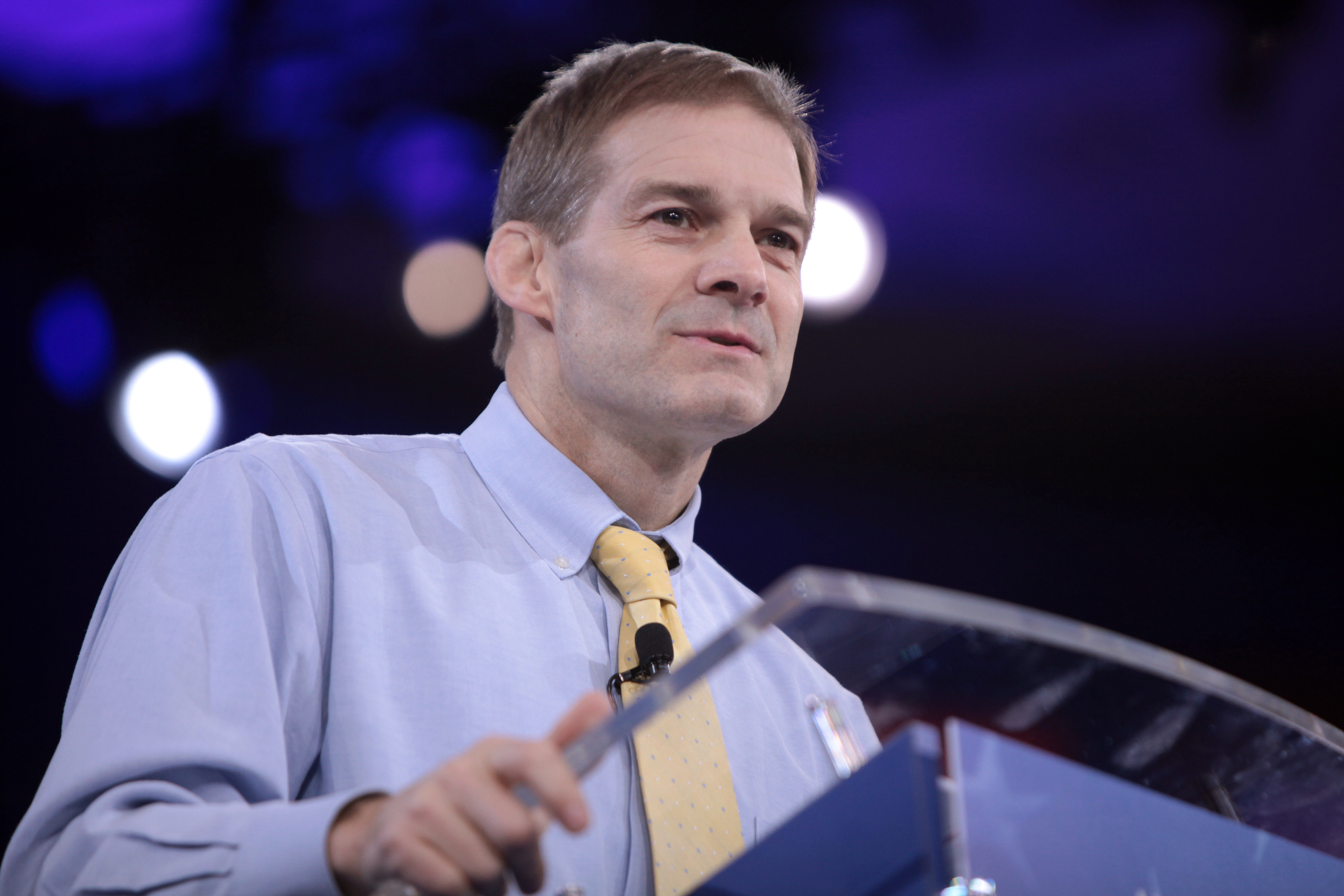
Jordan speaking at the 2016 Conservative Political Action Conference

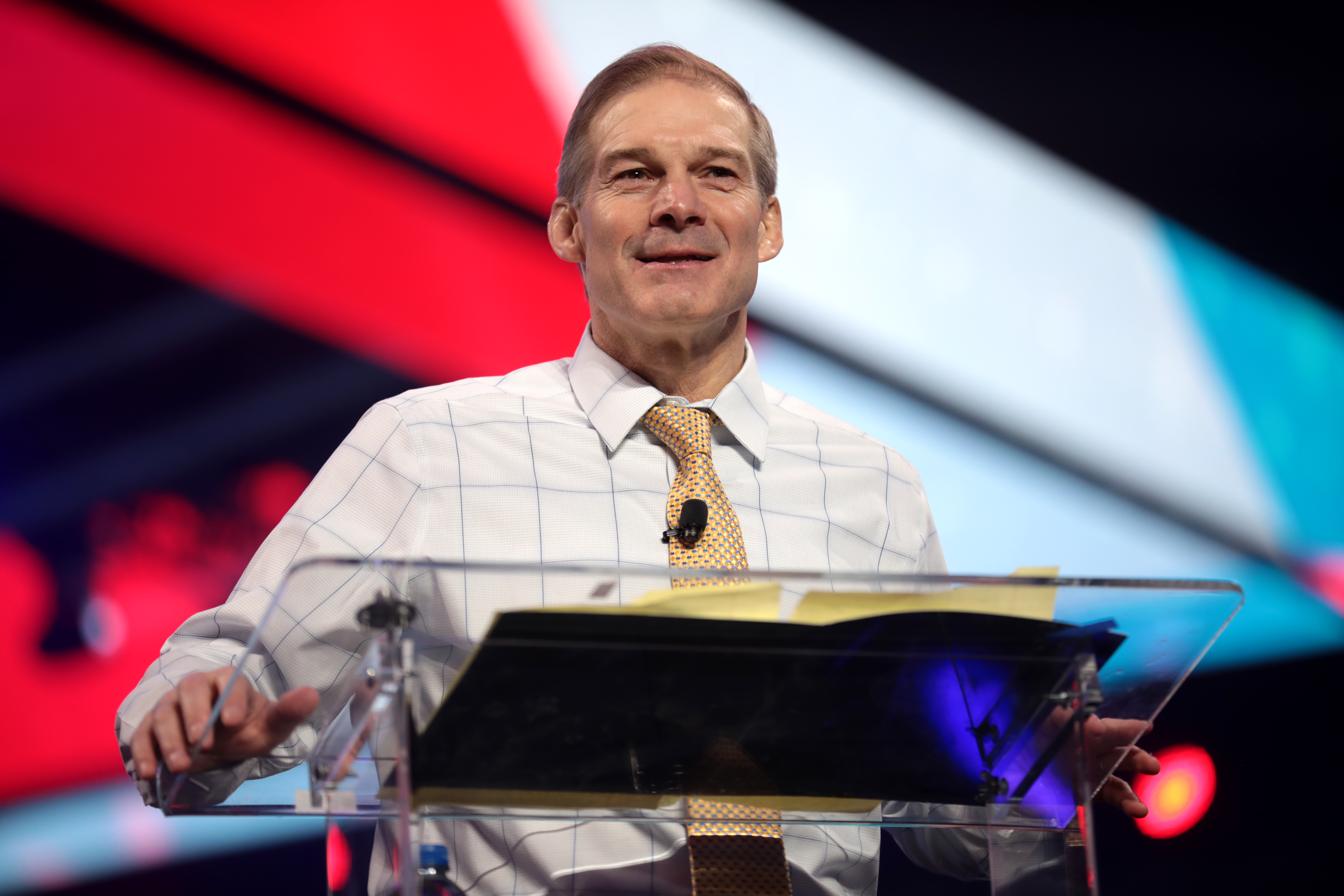
Jordan at the 2021 AmericaFest in Phoenix, Arizona

According to The Dayton Daily News, Jordan "is known for being one of Congress' most conservative members".

Jordan has earned a perfect score from the American Conservative Union. He has voted consistently for anti-abortion legislation and was endorsed by Ohio Right to Life in 2012. During the 112th Congress, he was one of 40 "staunch" members of the Republican Study Committee who frequently voted against Republican party leadership and vocally expressed displeasure with House bills.

Jordan was a leading critic of President Barack Obama's Home Affordable Modification Program (HAMP) program, advocating for its shutdown.

Jordan has supported the continued production and upgrades of M1 Abrams tanks in his district.

Jordan, along with all other Senate and House Republicans, voted against the American Rescue Plan Act of 2021.

=== Donald Trump ===
Jordan has been a stalwart supporter and close ally of Trump. Asked by Anderson Cooper in April 2018 whether he had ever heard Trump tell a lie, Jordan said "I have not" and "nothing comes to mind". He also said, "I don't know that [Trump has ever] said something wrong that he needs to apologize for."

In December 2017, Jordan sought to discredit the FBI and Special Counsel Robert Mueller's investigation into Russian interference in the 2016 election. He questioned Mueller's impartiality, and called on Deputy Attorney General Rod J. Rosenstein to use his authority to disband Mueller's investigation or create a second special counsel to simultaneously investigate Mueller himself. Rosenstein rejected the request, saying that he could not appoint another special counsel as there was no credible allegation of a potential crime. The New York Times reported that Republicans were increasingly criticizing Mueller's investigation after it "delivered a series of indictments to high-profile associates of the president and evidence that at least two of them are cooperating with the inquiry".

In July 2018, Jordan led efforts to impeach Rosenstein as a way to shut down Mueller's investigation. During a hearing on July 12, 2018, Jordan repeatedly interrupted FBI agent Peter Strzok while Strzok tried to explain that he couldn't answer specific questions to preserve the confidentiality of an ongoing investigation. Democrats protested Jordan's behavior and urged their fellow representatives to allow Strzok to respond. They also objected to Jordan's exceeding his allowed time for questioning. House Judiciary Committee chairman Bob Goodlatte admonished Jordan for his repeated interruptions of the witness.

In July 2018, Jordan and Mark Meadows called on the Department of Justice to "review allegations that Deputy Attorney General Rod Rosenstein threatened to subpoena phone records and documents from a House Intelligence Committee staffer". In their written request, the two wrote that in his use of investigative powers, Rosenstein had retaliated "against rank-and-file (congressional) staff members", thereby abusing his authority. To John Catsimatidis on WNYM, Jordan said he would force a vote on Rosenstein's impeachment if the DOJ did not deliver documents Congress requested.

In March 2019, House Judiciary chair Jerrold Nadler criticized Jordan for allegedly using antisemitic messaging by spelling the name of the 2020 presidential candidate Tom Steyer, whose father is Jewish, with a "$" in place of an "S" on Twitter, while urging Nadler to resist calls for Trump's impeachment.

During Mueller's testimony to two congressional committees on July 24, 2019, Jordan asked Mueller why he never charged Joseph Mifsud with lying to the FBI while George Papadopoulos was charged for lying about Mifsud. Jordan said: "Mifsud is the guy who told Papadopoulos [about Russian dirt]. He was the guy who started it all. Yet when the FBI interviews him, he lies three times; you don't charge him." Mueller responded, "Well, I can't get into it and it's obvious, I think, that we can't get into charging decisions."

On October 23, 2019, Jordan and two dozen other Republicans staged a protest that delayed a Trump impeachment inquiry hearing. The coordinated action disrupted the United States House Permanent Select Committee on Intelligence where Republican and Democratic congressional members planned to take testimony from Deputy Assistant Secretary of Defense Laura Cooper. The group staged a sit-in outside the Sensitive Compartmented Information Facility (SCIF) hearing room. Some of the Republicans who participated already had access to the hearings since the members of the House Oversight, Intelligence and Foreign Affairs committees were welcome to attend and ask questions.

Describing the sit-in, Jordan said, "The members have just had it, and they want to be able to see and represent their constituents and find out what's going on." The next day, he said on Fox News, "Adam Schiff is doing this unfair, partisan process in secret and our members finally said, 'Enough'. ... We're so frustrated. They reached a boiling point and these guys marched in and said 'we want to know what's going on.'"

House Homeland Security Committee Chairman Bennie Thompson wrote to the House sergeant-at-arms about Jordan, Representative Bradley Byrne, and others, requesting that he take action regarding their "unprecedented breach of security". Senator Lindsey Graham admonished his House colleagues for their tactic, calling them "nuts" for having made a "run on the SCIF".

As the ranking member of the House Judiciary Committee, during a July 2020 hearing with Attorney General Bill Barr, Jordan presented a video montage showing CNN reporters describing violent protests as "mostly peaceful". CNN host Jake Tapper claimed that the statements by the CNN reporters in the video shown by Jordan had been taken out of context.

In December 2020, Jordan was one of 126 Republican members of the House of Representatives to sign an amicus brief in support of Texas v. Pennsylvania, a lawsuit filed at the United States Supreme Court contesting the results of the 2020 presidential election, in which Joe Biden defeated Trump. The Supreme Court declined to hear the case on the basis that Texas lacked standing under Article III of the Constitution to challenge the results of an election held by another state. House Speaker Nancy Pelosi issued a statement that called signing the amicus brief an act of "election subversion" and an attempt to "subvert the Constitution and undermine public trust in our sacred democratic institutions." New Jersey Representative Bill Pascrell, citing section three of the 14th Amendment, called for Pelosi to not seat Jordan and other amicus brief signers, arguing that they had tried to "overturn a democratic election and install a dictator", while "the 14th Amendment expressly forbids Members of Congress from engaging in rebellion against the United States".

When the Supreme Court in October 2020 permitted counting Pennsylvania mail-in ballots collected three days after the 2020 election, Jordan declared: "Democrats are trying to steal the election, after the election." In December 2020, Jordan said: "I don't know how you can ever convince me that President Trump didn't actually win this" about the 2020 election. On January 5, 2021, Jordan alleged: "There was fraud on top of the unconstitutional way they ran the election [with pandemic voting laws] ... they added fraud on top of it. ... And that's why President Trump wasn't elected president". On January 12, 2021, Jordan claimed: "I've never said that this election was stolen".

On January 6–7, 2021, Jordan cast a vote to prevent the certification of the Electoral College in at least one state. He was one of the 139 representatives who voted to overturn the results of the 2020 presidential election in Congress on January 7, 2021, the day after the storming of the Capitol. At a later virtual committee meeting, Jordan said the storming of the Capitol "was as wrong as wrong can be".

On January 11, 2021, Trump awarded Jordan the Presidential Medal of Freedom in a closed-door ceremony.

Cassidy Hutchinson, a former aide to Trump chief of staff Mark Meadows, testified before the House Select Committee on the January 6 Attack that Jordan had talked to the White House about presidential pardons for Republican members of Congress who participated in attempts to overturn the 2020 United States presidential election.

=== FBI oversight ===
As chairman of the House Judiciary Committee, Jordan has led oversight investigations into FBI activities. In February 2023, Jordan launched an investigation into the FBI Richmond Catholic memo, which characterized "radical traditionalist Catholics" as potential domestic violent extremists. After the FBI provided only 18 heavily redacted pages in response to initial requests, Jordan issued a subpoena to Director Christopher A. Wray in April 2023. The committee's December 2023 report alleged the memo's scope extended beyond a single field office, contradicting Wray's testimony. Jordan's committee also conducted oversight of the Arctic Frost investigation, Special Counsel Jack Smith's investigation into individuals connected to the January 6 Capitol attack.

=== Antitrust and tech policy ===
Jordan has critiqued "Big Tech" companies, though he opposes proposals to break up these companies through antitrust enforcement.

Google has contributed money to his political campaign since 2012, including $10,000 in 2020. Tucker Carlson criticized Jordan for accepting donations from Google.

In 2023, Jordan refused to make Ken Buck the chairman of the Subcommittee on Antitrust, despite Buck being the most senior Republican on the committee and a proponent of antitrust enforcement. Conservatives criticized Jordan for this decision.

=== Disinformation research ===
As chairman of the House Judiciary Committee, Jordan is heading a legal campaign against researchers at universities, think tanks and private companies that study disinformation. Those affected include the Stanford Internet Observatory at Stanford University, the University of Washington, the Atlantic Council's Digital Forensic Research Lab and the social media analytics firm Graphika. Since January 2023, when Republicans gained a majority in the House, the House Judiciary Committee has sent letters, subpoenas, and threats of legal action to researchers, demanding notes, emails and other records from researchers and even student interns, dating back to 2015.

Projects affected include the Election Integrity Partnership, formed to identify attempts "to suppress voting, reduce participation, confuse voters or delegitimize election results without evidence" and the Virality Project, which has examined the spread of false claims about vaccines. Jordan claims that such organizations worked with the government to censor conservative speech online. Although research groups may have reported problematic content, "no evidence has emerged that government officials coerced the companies to take action against accounts". Researchers argue that they have academic freedom to study social media and disinformation as well as freedom of speech to report their results.

Previous research has indicated that sharing of disinformation and propaganda within the United States has been associated with the development of increasingly "partisan" media, appearing most strongly in right-wing sources such as Breitbart, The Daily Caller, and Fox News. The actions of Jordan and the House Judiciary Committee have been described by their opponents as an "attempt to chill research", creating a "chilling effect" through increased time demands, legal costs and online harassment of researchers.

=== Health care and drug policy ===
Jordan opposes the Affordable Care Act, calling for it to be repealed. He opposes vaccine requirements, describing them as "un-American".

Since coming into office, Jordan has voted in opposition to efforts to liberalize federal marijuana policy. Jordan supports the permanent classification of "fentanyl-related substances" as Schedule I drugs under the Controlled Substances Act. In 2017, Jordan argued that "the most beneficial things can be done at a local level" in responding to the opioid epidemic.

=== Environment ===
In July 2008, Jordan was the first member of Congress to sign the "No Climate Tax" pledge drafted by the conservative political advocacy group Americans for Prosperity.

In Congress, Jordan voted to open the Outer Continental Shelf to oil drilling, prevent the EPA from regulating greenhouse gases, and bar greenhouse gases from Clean Air Act rules. He voted against enforcing limits on carbon dioxide global warming pollution, tax credits for renewable electricity, tax incentives for renewable energy and energy conservation, and curtailing subsidies for oil and gas company exploration.

=== Abortion ===
Jordan opposes abortion, and supports banning federal funding to Planned Parenthood.

On July 12, 2022, Jordan tweeted to The Washington Examiner that a report of a 10-year-old Ohio girl traveling to Indiana to obtain a legal abortion after being raped was a lie. He deleted the tweet on July 13 after the rapist was arrested by police and confessed to raping the girl twice, and police confirmed that the report of her abortion in Indiana was accurate.

=== Taxes ===
While serving in the Ohio Senate, Jordan supported the Tax and Expenditure Limitation Amendment, a state constitutional amendment that would require a vote of the people to raise taxes or increase spending over certain limits.

=== Foreign policy ===
Jordan was among 60 Republicans to oppose condemning Trump's action of withdrawing forces from Syria. According to The American Conservative, along with Matt Gaetz and a handful of Republicans, he broke with the party and voted to end Saudi assistance to the war in Yemen.

In June 2021, Jordan was one of 49 House Republicans to vote to repeal the AUMF against Iraq. In 2023, Jordan was among 47 Republicans to vote in favor of H.Con.Res. 21 which directed President Joe Biden to remove U.S. troops from Syria within 180 days.

Since the onset of the 2022 Russian invasion of Ukraine, Jordan has reportedly voted in opposition to almost all bills to provide military assistance to Ukraine.

Jordan endorsed providing aid to Israel in the wake of the Gaza war.

=== LGBTQ rights ===
In 2015, Jordan cosponsored a resolution to amend the US constitution to ban same-sex marriage. Jordan condemned the Supreme Court ruling in Obergefell v. Hodges, which held that same-sex marriage bans violated the Constitution.

=== Veterans ===
Jordan voted against Honoring our PACT Act of 2022, an act which expanded VA benefits to veterans exposed to toxic chemicals during their military service.

=== COVID-19 ===
Jordan supported protests in April 2020 that opposed government lockdowns intended to curb the spread of the COVID-19 pandemic in the United States. Jordan opposes vaccine mandates, calling them "un-American". Jordan criticized Anthony Fauci during congressional hearings over his pandemic policy recommendations, and in 2021 called on Fauci to resign. In December 2021, when the mortality toll from COVID-19 in the United States averaged 1,659 deaths per day, Jordan declared that "Real America is done with COVID-19. The only people who don't understand that are Fauci and Biden." In 2023, Jordan invited activist Robert F. Kennedy Jr., who opposed Covid vaccine mandates, to testify before Congress about alleged censorship of his opinions on social media. Jordan defended a tweet by Kennedy which implied that Hank Aaron, who died in 2021 of natural causes, had died due to Aaron being administered the COVID-19 vaccine. Jordan said Kennedy's tweet was not "factually inaccurate. Hank Aaron, real person, great American, passed away after he got the vaccine. Pointing out, just pointing out facts."

== Personal life ==
Jordan and his wife, Polly, live near Urbana, Ohio, in central Champaign County. They were introduced by her brothers, with whom Jordan competed in wrestling. Polly and Jordan started dating when he was 13 and she was 14. They have four children and two grandchildren. Jordan's son-in-law, Jarrod Uthoff, is a professional basketball player.

Jordan is an evangelical Christian.

== Wrestling record ==
College

Season	Year	School	Rank	Weight Class	Record	Win
1986	Senior	University of Wisconsin	#1 (1st)	134	30–1–1	92.59%
1985	Junior	University of Wisconsin	#1 (1st)	134	46–4	92.00%
1984	Sophomore	University of Wisconsin	#6 (6th)	134	40–12	76.92%
1983	Freshman	University of Wisconsin	DNQ	134	29–0	68.97%
Career					156-28–1	84.32%

High School

Season	Year	School	Weight Class	Record	Win
1982	Senior	Graham High School	126	150–1	99.34%
1981	Junior	Graham High School	112	150–1	99.34%
1980	Sophomore	Graham High School	105	150–1	99.34%
1979	Freshman	Graham High School	98	150–1	99.34%

== Electoral history ==
Election results of Jim Jordan
Year	Office	Election	Party	Votes	%	Opponent	Party	Votes	%	Opponent	Party	Votes	%
1998	Ohio House of Representatives	General	R	23,763	68.36%	Robert Burns	D	10,999	31.64%				
2000	Ohio Senate	General	R	99,803	76.94%	Jack Kaffenberger Sr.	I	15,545	11.98%	Debra Mitchell	NL	14,373	11.08%
2004	Ohio Senate	General	R	118,193	79.27%	Jack Kaffenberger Sr.	I	30,902	20.73%				
2006	U.S. House of Representatives	General	R	129,958	59.99%	Richard E. Siferd	D	86,678	40.01%				
2008	U.S. House of Representatives	General	R	186,154	65.17%	Mike Carroll	D	99,499	34.83%				
2010	U.S. House of Representatives	General	R	146,029	71.49%	Doug Litt	D	50,533	24.74%	Donald Kissick	L	7,708	3.77%
2012	U.S. House of Representatives	General	R	182,643	58.35%	Jim Slone	D	114,214	36.49%	Chris Kalla	L	16,141	5.16%
2014	U.S. House of Representatives	General	R	125,907	67.67%	Janet Garrett	D	60,165	32.33%				
2016	U.S. House of Representatives	General	R	210,227	67.99%	Janet Garrett	D	98,981	32.01%				
2018	U.S. House of Representatives	General	R	164,640	65.41%	Janet Garrett	D	87,061	34.59%				
2020	U.S. House of Representatives	General	R	235,875	67.85%	Shannon Freshour	D	101,897	29.31%	Steve Perkins	L	9,854	2.83%
2022	U.S. House of Representatives	General	R	200,773	69.2%	Tamie Wilson	D	89,383	30.8%				
2024	U.S. House of Representatives	General	R	192,767	67.3%	Tamie Wilson	D	93,672	32.7%				

== See also ==
- Conspiracy theories related to the Trump–Ukraine scandal

== Notes ==
U.S. House of Representatives
Preceded by Mike Oxley	Member of the U.S. House of Representatives from Ohio's 4th congressional district 2007–present	Incumbent
New office	Chair of the House Freedom Caucus; 2015–2017	Succeeded by Mark Meadows
Preceded by Jerry Nadler	Chair of the House Judiciary Committee; 2023–present	Incumbent
Preceded by Hakeem Jeffries	House Minority Leader; Taking office 2027	Designate
Party political offices
Preceded by Tom Price	Chair of the Republican Study Committee; 2011–2013	Succeeded by Steve Scalise
Preceded by Mike Johnson	House Republican Leader; Taking office 2027	Elect
U.S. order of precedence (ceremonial)
Preceded by Hank Johnson	United States representatives by seniority 60th	Succeeded by Adrian Smith
