= H.Res. 565 (113th Congress) =

- Long title: Calling on Attorney General Eric H. Holder, Jr., to appoint a special counsel to investigate the targeting of conservative nonprofit groups by the Internal Revenue Service.
- Announced in: the 113th United States Congress
- Sponsored by: Rep. Jim Jordan (R-OH)
- Number of co-sponsors: 7

Legislative history
- Introduced in the House as H.Res. 565 by Rep. Jim Jordan (R-OH) on May 2, 2014; Committee consideration by United States House Committee on the Judiciary; Passed the House on May 7, 2014 (Roll Call Vote 204: 250-168)

The resolution H.Res. 565, "Calling on Attorney General Eric H. Holder, Jr., to appoint a special counsel to investigate the targeting of conservative nonprofit groups by the Internal Revenue Service," was passed by the United States House of Representatives during the 113th United States Congress. The simple resolution asks U.S. Attorney General Eric Holder to appoint a special counsel to investigate that 2013 IRS scandal. The Internal Revenue Service revealed in 2013 that it had selected political groups applying for tax-exempt status for closer scrutiny based on their names or political themes.

== Background ==
In 2013, the United States Internal Revenue Service (IRS) revealed that it had selected political groups applying for tax-exempt status for closer scrutiny based on their names or political themes. This led to wide condemnation of the agency and triggered several investigations, including a Federal Bureau of Investigation criminal probe ordered by United States Attorney General Eric Holder. Initial reports described the selections as nearly exclusively of conservative groups with terms such as "Tea Party" in their names. Further investigation revealed that liberal-leaning groups and the Occupy movement had also triggered additional scrutiny, but not at nearly the same rate as conservative groups. The only denial of tax-exempt status by the IRS was to a progressive group. The use of target lists continued through May 2013.

United States federal tax law, specifically Section 501(c)(4) of the Internal Revenue Code (26 U.S.C. § 501(c)), exempts certain types of nonprofit organizations from having to pay federal income tax. The statutory language of IRC 501(c)(4) generally requires civic organizations described in that section to be "operated exclusively for the promotion of social welfare". Treasury regulations interpreting this statutory language apply a more relaxed standard, namely, that the organization "is operated primarily for the purpose of bringing about civic betterments and social improvements". As a result, the IRS traditionally has permitted organizations described in IRC 501(c)(4) to engage in lobbying and political campaign activities if those activities are not the organization's primary activity.

Internal Revenue Service rules also protect groups organized under Section 501(c)(4) as nonprofit organizations dedicated to social welfare from having to reveal the names of their donors or the amount of funds the individual donors have contributed. This protection dates back to the United States Supreme Court's 1958 ruling in NAACP v. Alabama, when the Court held that disclosure of names could render private donors vulnerable to retaliation.

Beginning in March 2010, the IRS more closely scrutinized certain organizations applying for tax-exempt status under Section 501(c)(4) of the Internal Revenue Code by focusing on groups with certain words in their names. In May 2010, some employees of the "Determinations Unit" of the Cincinnati office of the IRS, which is tasked with reviewing applications pertaining to tax-exempt status, began developing a spreadsheet that became known as the "Be On the Look Out" list.

The list, first distributed in August 2010, suggested intensive scrutiny of applicants with names related to the Tea Party movement and other conservative causes. Eventually, IRS employees in at least Cincinnati, Ohio; El Monte, California; Laguna Niguel, California; and Washington, D.C. applied closer scrutiny to applications from organizations that:

- referenced words such as "Tea Party", "Patriots", "Israel", "progressive", "occupy", or "9/12 Project" in the case file;
- outlined issues in the application that included government spending, government debt, or taxes;
- involved advocating or lobbying to "make America a better place to live";
- had statements in the case file that criticized how the country is being run;
- advocated education about the Constitution and the Bill of Rights;
- were focused on challenging the Patient Protection and Affordable Care Act — known by many as Obamacare;
- questioned the integrity of federal elections.

Over the two years between April 2010 and April 2012, the IRS essentially placed on hold the processing of applications for 501(c)(4) tax-exemption status received from organizations with "Tea Party", "patriots", or "9/12" in their names.

== Provisions of the bill ==
This summary is based largely on the summary provided by the Congressional Research Service, a public domain source.

The resolution expresses the sense of the House of Representatives that Attorney General Eric H. Holder, Jr. should appoint a special counsel, without further delay, to investigate the targeting of conservative nonprofit advocacy groups by the Internal Revenue Service (IRS).

== Procedural history ==
The bill H.Res. 565 was introduced into the United States House of Representatives on May 2, 2014 by Rep. Jim Jordan (R-OH). The bill was referred to the United States House Committee on the Judiciary. On May 7, 2014, the House voted in Roll Call Vote 204 to pass the bill 250-168.

== Debate and discussion ==
Rep. Dave Camp argued in favor of the resolution, saying "we must hold the IRS accountable so this powerful agency cannot be used as a tool to target and harass Americans for their political beliefs." Camp explained the need for a special counsel by saying "I have serious concerns that the Department of Justice has brushed aside this investigation and will not pursue (former IRS executive Lois) Lerner for the wrongdoing she committed. Therefore, DOJ must appoint a special counsel, so we can have an independent review of what really happened at the IRS."

Rep. Jim Jordan, who introduced the resolution, said that "we need this special counsel to help us get to the truth because the so-called investigation by the Justice Department has been a joke. The current investigation has no credibility because it is being headed by a maxed-out donor who is financially invested in the president's success."

Rep. Darrell Issa argued the resolution was necessary because "Congressional investigations into the IRS targeting scandal have uncovered evidence of serious criminal activity, which must be resolved according to the law. Unfortunately, the Department of Justice's current investigation has lost credibility and public confidence."

House Democrats argued against the resolution because the ongoing Justice Department investigation of the scandal was sufficient to make appointing a special counsel unnecessary. They have also argued that this resolution is a political ploy to draw attention to the scandal in order to help the Republicans win more elections later in 2014.

== See also ==
- List of bills in the 113th United States Congress
- Lois Lerner
