= Paul Abbate =

American law enforcement officer

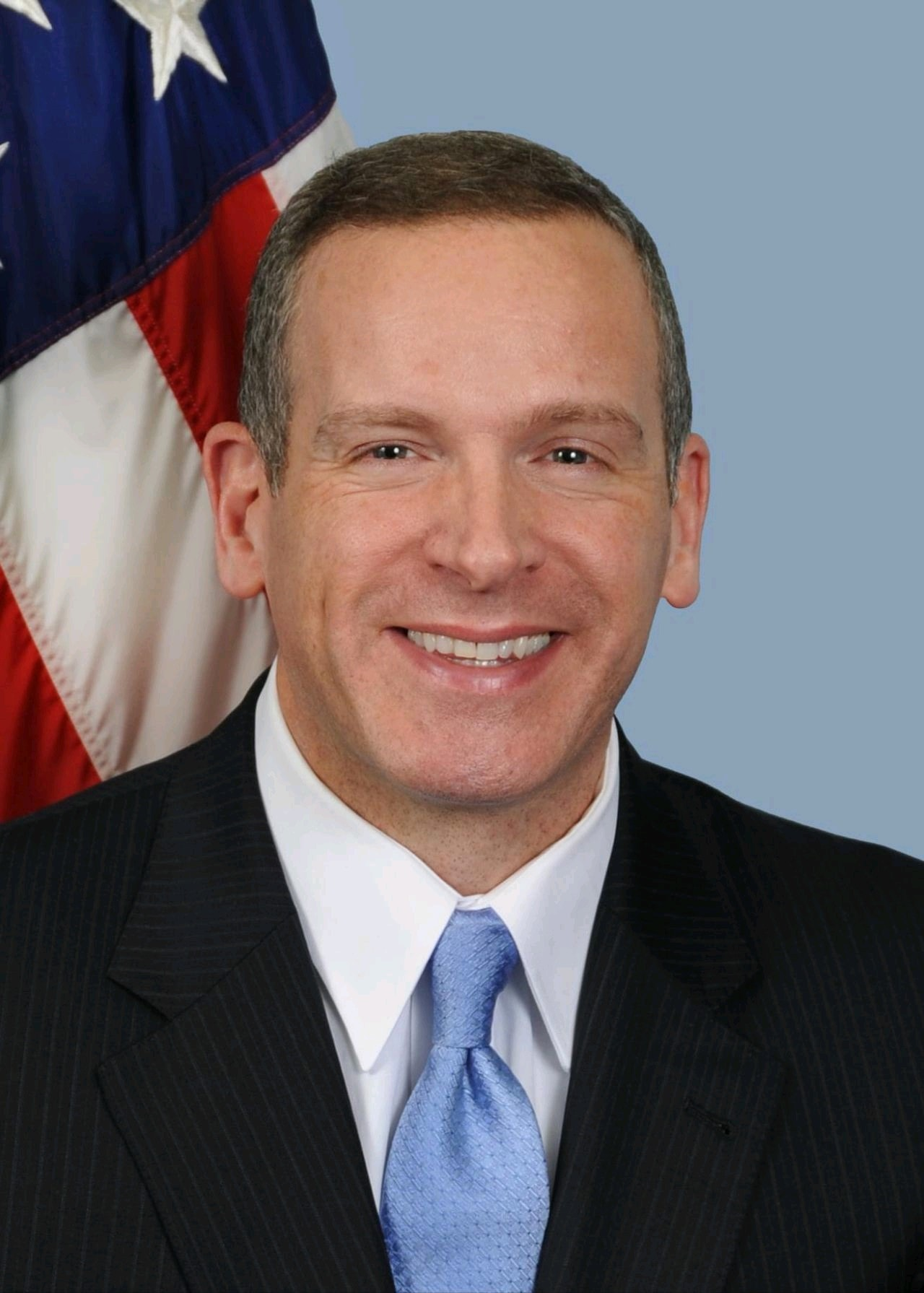
- Official portrait, c. 2018

19th Deputy Director of the Federal Bureau of Investigation
- In office February 1, 2021 – January 20, 2025
- President: Joe Biden
- Preceded by: David Bowdich
- Succeeded by: Dan Bongino

Director of the Federal Bureau of Investigation
- Acting; January 19, 2025 – January 20, 2025
- President: Joe Biden
- Preceded by: Christopher A. Wray
- Succeeded by: Brian Driscoll (acting)

Associate Deputy Director of the Federal Bureau of Investigation
- In office April 13, 2018 – February 1, 2021
- President: Donald Trump; Joe Biden
- Preceded by: David Bowdich
- Succeeded by: Jeffrey Sallet

Personal details
- Born: 1967 (age 58–59)
- Education: Quinnipiac University (BS); University of Connecticut (JD)

Paul M. Abbate (/ˈɑːbeɪt/ AH-bayt; born 1967) is an American former law enforcement officer who served as the acting director of the Federal Bureau of Investigation from January 19 to January 20, 2025, following Christopher A. Wray's resignation. He served as the deputy director of the Federal Bureau of Investigation from 2021 until his retirement on January 20, 2025, and previously served as the associate deputy director from 2018 to 2021.

== Career ==
Abbate has a Juris Doctor from the University of Connecticut School of Law. He started his Federal Bureau of Investigation (FBI) career in March 1996. He was assigned to the New York City Field Office, where he worked in the Criminal Division and served as a member of the SWAT team. In 2012, he was named Special Agent In Charge of the Counterterrorism Division. He led FBI field operations while deployed in Iraq, Afghanistan and Libya.

In 2017, after President Trump's dismissal of James Comey, Abbate was on the shortlist of officials considered for the role of FBI director. In February 2018, Abbate was named associate deputy director of the FBI. He was succeeded by Jeffrey Sallet, after being promoted to deputy director of the FBI in February 2021. He retired on January 20, 2025, having stayed on briefly with then-FBI Director Chris Wray's permission after reaching the mandatory age of 57. Wray had retired four days earlier. Acting Attorney General James McHenry then appointed Robert Kissane, special agent in charge for counterterrorism in New York, to serve as acting deputy director of the FBI.

== Controversies ==
=== Arctic Frost investigation ===
In April 2022, while serving as FBI deputy director, Abbate was among the officials who approved the opening communication for the Arctic Frost investigation, an FBI investigation into efforts to overturn the 2020 United States presidential election.

=== FBI Richmond Catholic memo ===
According to a House Judiciary Committee report, Deputy Director Abbate ordered permanent removal of the FBI Richmond Catholic memo and all references from FBI systems in February 2023 following its public leak, a decision that became the subject of congressional oversight inquiries.

== Awards ==
Abbate was named one of 22 people chosen as Security Magazine's "Most Influential People in Security 2020".

Government offices
Preceded by David Bowdich	Associate Deputy Director of the Federal Bureau of Investigation; 2018–2021	Succeeded by Jeffrey Sallet
Preceded by David Bowdich	Deputy Director of the Federal Bureau of Investigation; 2021–2025	Succeeded by Robert Kissane; Acting
Preceded by Christopher A. Wray	Director of the Federal Bureau of Investigation; Acting; 2025	Succeeded by Brian Driscoll; Acting
