= Brian Driscoll =

American law enforcement official

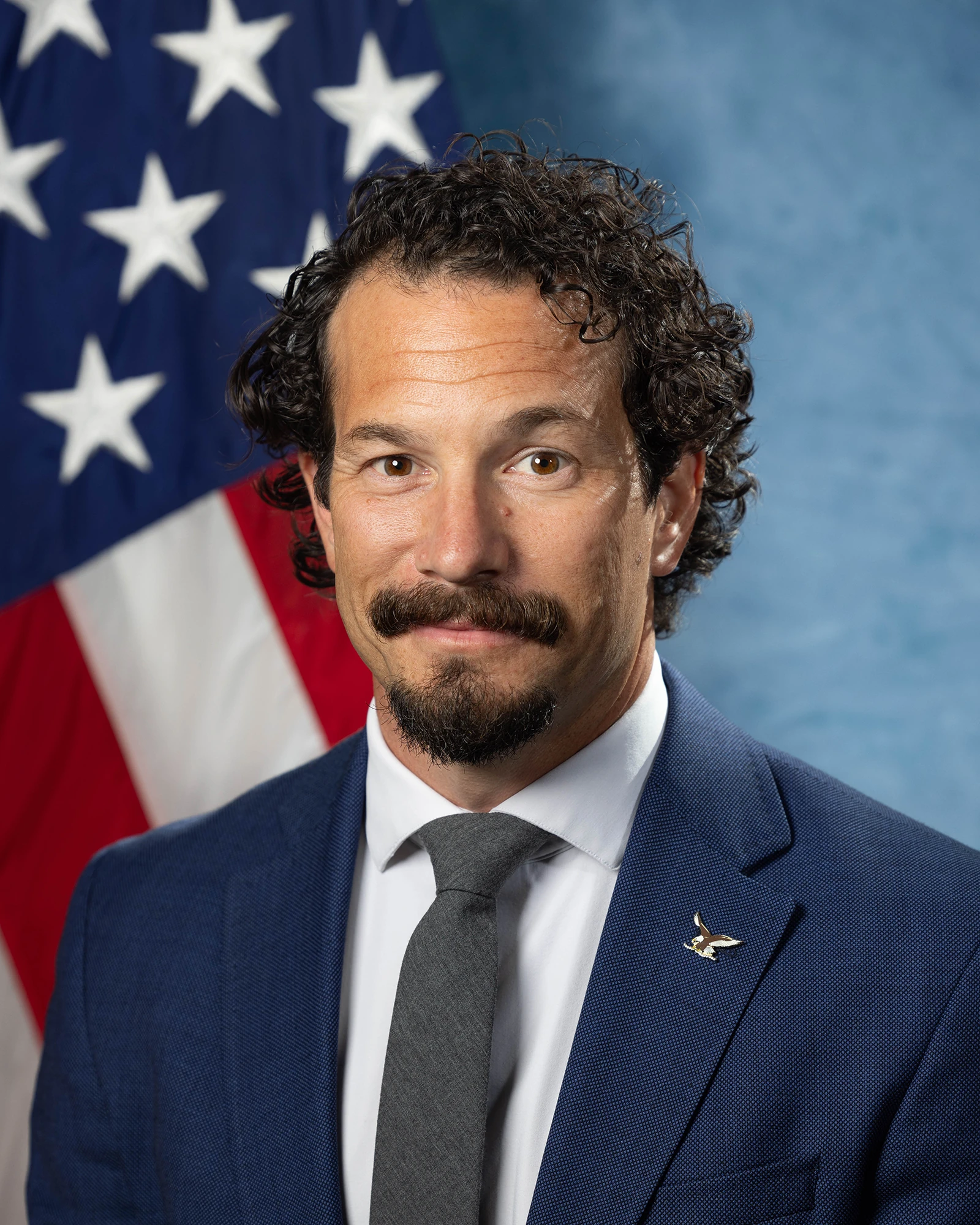
- Official portrait, 2025

Director of the Federal Bureau of Investigation
- Acting
- In office January 20, 2025 – February 21, 2025
- President: Donald Trump
- Deputy: Robert Kissane (acting)
- Preceded by: Paul Abbate (acting)
- Succeeded by: Kash Patel

Personal details
- Born: 1979 or 1980 (age 46–47)
- Education: Villanova University (BA); Pepperdine University (MPP)

Military service
- Battles/wars: Operation Inherent Resolve

Brian J. Driscoll (born 1979 or 1980) is an American law enforcement official who served as the acting director of the Federal Bureau of Investigation (FBI) from January 20 to February 21, 2025. He was an FBI special agent from 2007 until his firing in August 2025, following the fallout from a disagreement with the Trump administration. Driscoll is a recipient of the FBI Medal of Valor and the FBI Shield of Bravery.

== Education and early career ==
Driscoll has a bachelor's degree in English from Villanova University and a master's degree in public policy and international relations from Pepperdine University. Prior to his career with the FBI, he was a special agent at NCIS.

== FBI career ==
In 2007, Driscoll joined the Federal Bureau of Investigation (FBI) as a special agent. He was first assigned to the New York field office, where he worked in organized crime and later became a member of the regional SWAT team. In 2011, he was selected for the Hostage Rescue Team, the elite tactical unit of the agency, serving in the Blue Squadron. In this role, Driscoll was part of two notable raids. First, in 2013, his unit was sent to Alabama and successfully saved a five year old boy who had been taken hostage in a bunker. Two years later, he was part of a raid in Syria along with Delta Force, involved in rescue efforts of Kayla Mueller who had been taken hostage by the Islamic State. The operation led to the elimination of a top Islamic State official and the capture of his wife.

Driscoll returned to New York in 2019 to work as a supervisory special agent to establish and lead two joint task forces concerning violent crimes, child exploitation, and human trafficking. In 2020, Driscoll was transferred to the New York Joint Terrorism Task Force to lead the North Africa international terrorism investigations squad. Driscoll was later promoted to serve as the assistant special agent in charge of the New York Joint Terrorism Task Force Extraterritorial Terrorism Branch. He was promoted in 2022 to head of the Hostage Rescue Team and tactical section chief of the Critical Incident Response Group. As of July 2025, following a brief tenure as Acting Director, Driscoll serves as an Assistant Director of the FBI's Critical Incident Response Group (CIRG).

=== Acting FBI Director ===
Following the 2024 presidential election, the Trump transition team asked Driscoll to serve as Deputy Director of the FBI underneath Robert Kissane as acting director. However, following the inauguration of Donald Trump in January 2025, Driscoll became acting director of the FBI because the White House website "incorrectly listed" him as acting director and Kissane as deputy director. "Instead of fixing the error, the pair swapped their temporary FBI roles", according to The Wall Street Journal.

On January 31, 2025, as part of a planned mass termination of federal law enforcement officials under the second Trump administration, the FBI under Driscoll was ordered to fire eight senior executives and compile a list of potentially thousands of other employees involved in investigations stemming from the January 6 United States Capitol attack. Driscoll said that the list of such employees included himself and acting deputy director Kissane. The order came from Emil Bove, a former criminal defense attorney for Trump who became the Trump administration's acting Deputy Attorney General. Driscoll refused to endorse the effort to purge agents as part of a political retribution and pushed back. He was fired by President Trump on August 7, 2025. A month later, Driscoll and two other former senior FBI officials filed a lawsuit, accusing Trump administration officials of wrongful dismissal in an effort to diminish the level of independence possessed by the agency.

Government offices
Preceded by Paul Abbate; Acting	Director of the Federal Bureau of Investigation; Acting; 2025	Succeeded by Kash Patel
