= Christopher A. Wray =

American attorney (born 1966)

Chris Wray
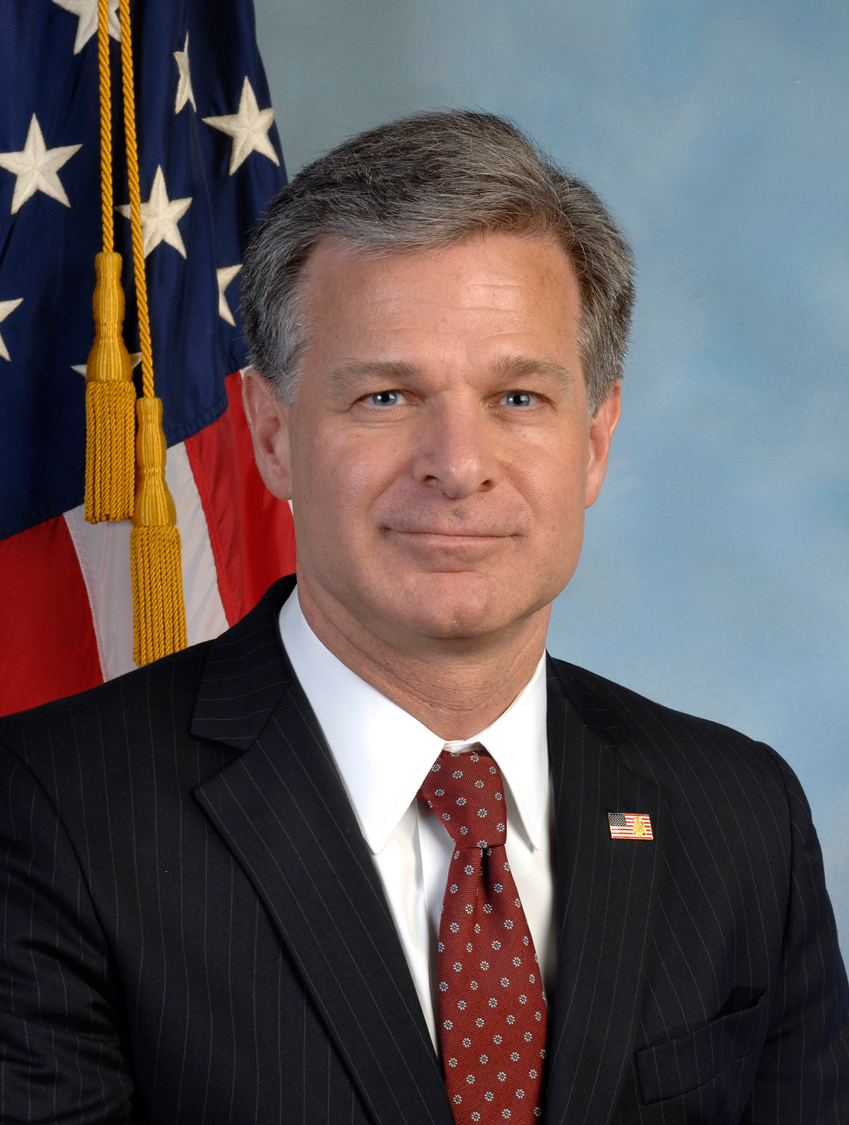
- Official portrait, 2017

8th Director of the Federal Bureau of Investigation
- In office August 2, 2017 – January 19, 2025
- President: Donald Trump; Joe Biden
- Deputy: Andrew McCabe; David Bowdich; Paul Abbate
- Preceded by: James Comey
- Succeeded by: Kash Patel

United States Assistant Attorney General for the Criminal Division
- In office September 11, 2003 – May 17, 2005
- President: George W. Bush
- Preceded by: Michael Chertoff
- Succeeded by: Alice S. Fisher

Personal details
- Born: Christopher Asher Wray; December 17, 1966 (age 59) New York City, U.S.
- Party: Republican
- Spouse: Helen Garrison Howell (m. 1989)
- Children: 2
- Education: Yale University (BA, JD)
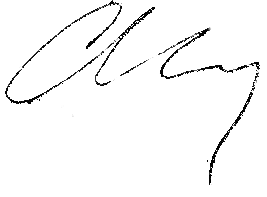
- Signature
- Wray's voice Wray's opening statement at a Senate Homeland Security Committee hearing on domestic threats Recorded November 17, 2022

Christopher Asher Wray (born December 17, 1966) is an American attorney who served as the eighth director of the Federal Bureau of Investigation (FBI) from 2017 to 2025. He was nominated by President Donald Trump to replace James Comey. He was confirmed by the U.S. Senate on July 30. Wray took office on August 2, 2017 to serve a 10-year term.

Born in New York City, Wray graduated from Yale University in 1989, then attended Yale Law School. He joined government in 1997 as an Assistant United States Attorney for the Northern District of Georgia. From 2003 to 2005, Wray served as Assistant Attorney General in charge of the Criminal Division in George W. Bush's administration. He later was a litigation partner with the multinational law firm King & Spalding from 2005 to 2016. Wray is a registered Republican.

On November 30, 2024, President-elect Donald Trump put forward Kash Patel as a nominee to replace Wray. Federal law specifies the term of the director of the FBI as ten years. Wray held office for seven years of the term. On December 11, Wray announced that he would resign as director in January 2025, coinciding with the conclusion of the Biden administration.

== Early life and education ==
Christopher Asher Wray was born in New York City. His father, Cecil A. Wray Jr., was a graduate of Vanderbilt University and Yale Law School who worked as a lawyer at Debevoise & Plimpton in New York City. His paternal grandfather, T. Cecil Wray, was the city manager of Brentwood, Tennessee from 1971 to 1973. His paternal great-grandfather, Taylor Malone, was also a Vanderbilt graduate, and the co-founder and president of Malone & Hyde, "one of the South's largest wholesale grocery firms." His maternal grandfather, Samuel E. Gates, "helped shape the laws that govern national and international airline flights" as an official of the Bureau of Air Commerce.

Wray attended the private Buckley School in New York City and the private boarding school Phillips Academy in Andover, Massachusetts. After graduating, Wray attended Yale University where he majored in philosophy and graduated cum laude in 1989 with a Bachelor of Arts degree. He then attended Yale Law School, where he was the executive editor of the Yale Law Journal and graduated in 1992 with a Juris Doctor.

== Early career ==
After graduating from law school, Wray was a law clerk to Judge J. Michael Luttig of the U.S. Court of Appeals for the Fourth Circuit from 1992 to 1993. He then entered private practice at the law firm King & Spalding.

Wray joined the government in 1997 as an Assistant United States Attorney for the Northern District of Georgia. In 2001, he moved to the Justice Department as associate deputy attorney general and principal associate deputy attorney general.

On June 9, 2003, President George W. Bush nominated Wray to be the 33rd Assistant Attorney General in charge of the Criminal Division of the Justice Department. Wray was unanimously confirmed by the Senate on September 11, 2003. Wray was Assistant Attorney General from 2003 to 2005, working under Deputy Attorney General James Comey. While heading the Criminal Division, Wray oversaw prominent fraud investigations, including Enron.

In early 2004, the Justice Department issued a finding that the Bush administration's warrantless domestic surveillance program under the Terrorist Surveillance Program (TSP) was unconstitutional. Under White House procedures, DoJ approval was required in order for the program to be renewed. In 2006, it was revealed DoJ officials came under pressure from the White House to change this ruling, and that then-FBI Director Robert Mueller and Comey had prepared their resignations if the White House overruled it. In 2013, it was revealed that Wray threatened to resign along with them over the matter.

In March 2005, Wray announced that he would resign from his post.

In 2005, Wray received the Edmund J. Randolph Award, the Justice Department's highest award for public service and leadership.

In 2005, Wray returned to King & Spalding as a litigation partner in the firm's Washington, D.C., and Atlanta offices. Wray represented several Fortune 100 companies and chaired the King & Spalding Special Matters and Government Investigations Practice Group. During his time at King & Spalding, Wray acted as New Jersey Governor Chris Christie's personal attorney during the Bridgegate scandal. Wray's firm also represents Russian energy giants Gazprom and Rosneft, an issue which came under contention during the confirmation process for position of FBI Director.

== Director of the Federal Bureau of Investigation (2017–2025) ==
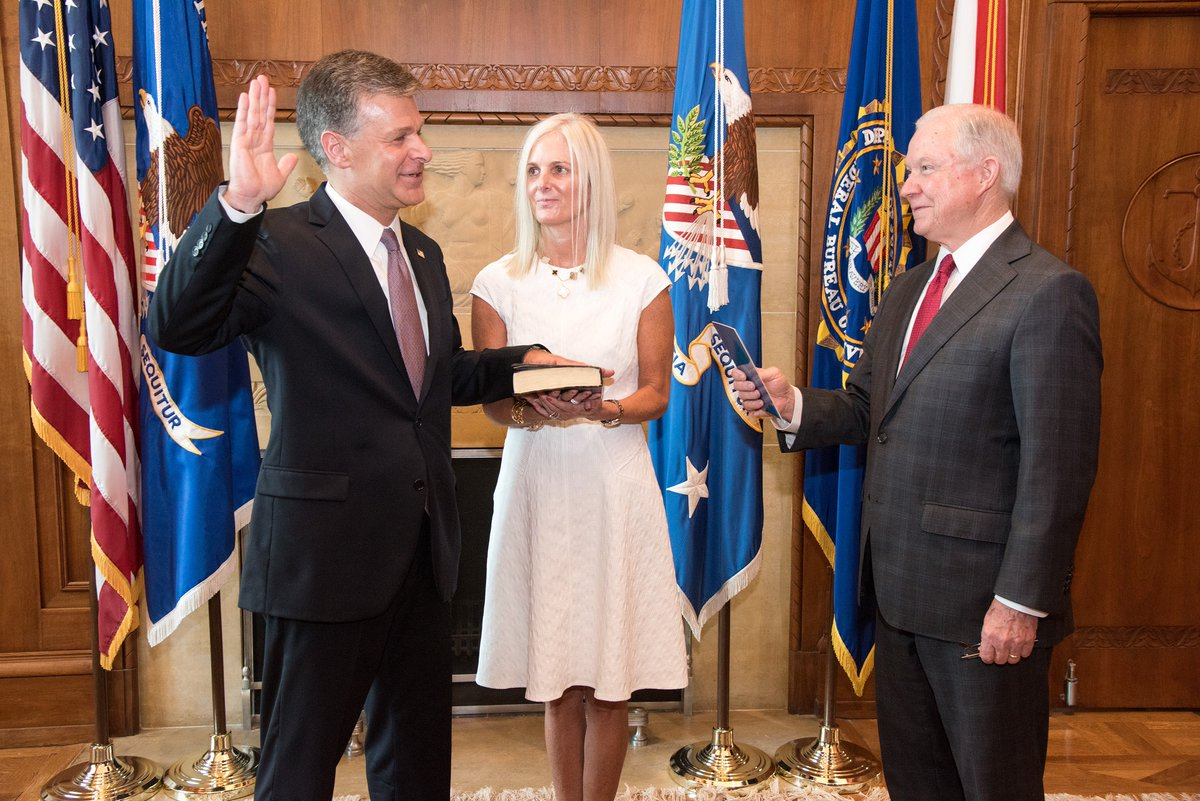
Wray being sworn in as FBI Director by Attorney General Jeff Sessions

=== Nomination ===
Following the dismissal of FBI Director James Comey on May 9, 2017, New Jersey Governor Chris Christie presented to President Donald Trump the possibility of hiring Wray as Comey's replacement. According to then Press Secretary Sean Spicer, Trump interviewed Wray for the vacant FBI Director job on May 30. Eight days later, Trump announced his intention to nominate Wray to be the next FBI Director.

Wray's Senate confirmation hearing commenced on July 12, 2017. Among other testimony, when asked if he believed that the investigation into Russian 2016 election interference and possible links to Trump's campaign is a "witch hunt", he stated that he did not. On July 20, the Senate Judiciary Committee unanimously recommended to confirm Wray as the next Director of the FBI. Wray was officially confirmed by the Senate with bipartisan support on August 1, 2017; the vote was 92–5. According to law passed by Congress in 1976 (Federal law (Public Law 94-503, section 203(b)), the director of the FBI serves a ten-year term.

Wray was sworn in by Attorney General Jeff Sessions in a private ceremony on August 2, 2017. Wray was formally sworn in on September 28, 2017, in a ceremony that was not attended by President Trump, marking the first time an FBI director had been sworn in without the president who nominated him present at the ceremony.

=== Tenure ===
In January 2020, Senator Chris Murphy wrote to Wray, urging the FBI to "investigate the allegations" that Saudi Arabia "illegally compromised and stole personal data" from Jeff Bezos, the owner of The Washington Post, as part of a possible effort to "influence, if not silence, the Washington Post's reporting on Saudi Arabia".

On June 4, 2020, Wray stated that "anarchists" like antifa are "exploiting" George Floyd protests "to pursue violent, extremist agendas". Wray later clarified that antifa is an ideology rather than a specific organization, clashing with Trump.

In April 2020, Trump considered ousting Wray and replacing him with William Evanina but when Attorney General William Barr threatened to resign, Trump backed down. In May 2020, Wray ordered an internal review into possible misconduct in the FBI's investigation of Trump's former national security adviser Michael Flynn. On October 28, the FBI Agents Association released a letter addressed to both Trump and Joe Biden requesting Wray remain Director of the FBI for the 10-year term. On December 2, a member of then-president-elect Biden's transition team announced that if Wray was not fired or removed from his position by Trump, then he would remain Director of the FBI. On March 2, 2021, Wray testified in Senate hearings about the extremism that led to the 2021 storming of the United States Capitol in which he condemned the attack on the U.S. Capitol and argued that it was a case of domestic terrorism.

In July 2023, Wray was questioned by House Republicans regarding allegations of political bias and civil liberties violations. Republicans alleged FBI's interference in the Hunter Biden investigation and broader abuses of power. Rep. Jim Jordan (R-OH)'s committee "released a report ... about U.S. social media companies facilitating 'censorship requests to American social media companies on behalf of a Ukrainian intelligence agency infiltrated by Russian-aligned actors'." Wray responded by saying the FBI had arrested "20,000 violent criminals, removing an average of 60 criminals from the streets per day."

==== China ====
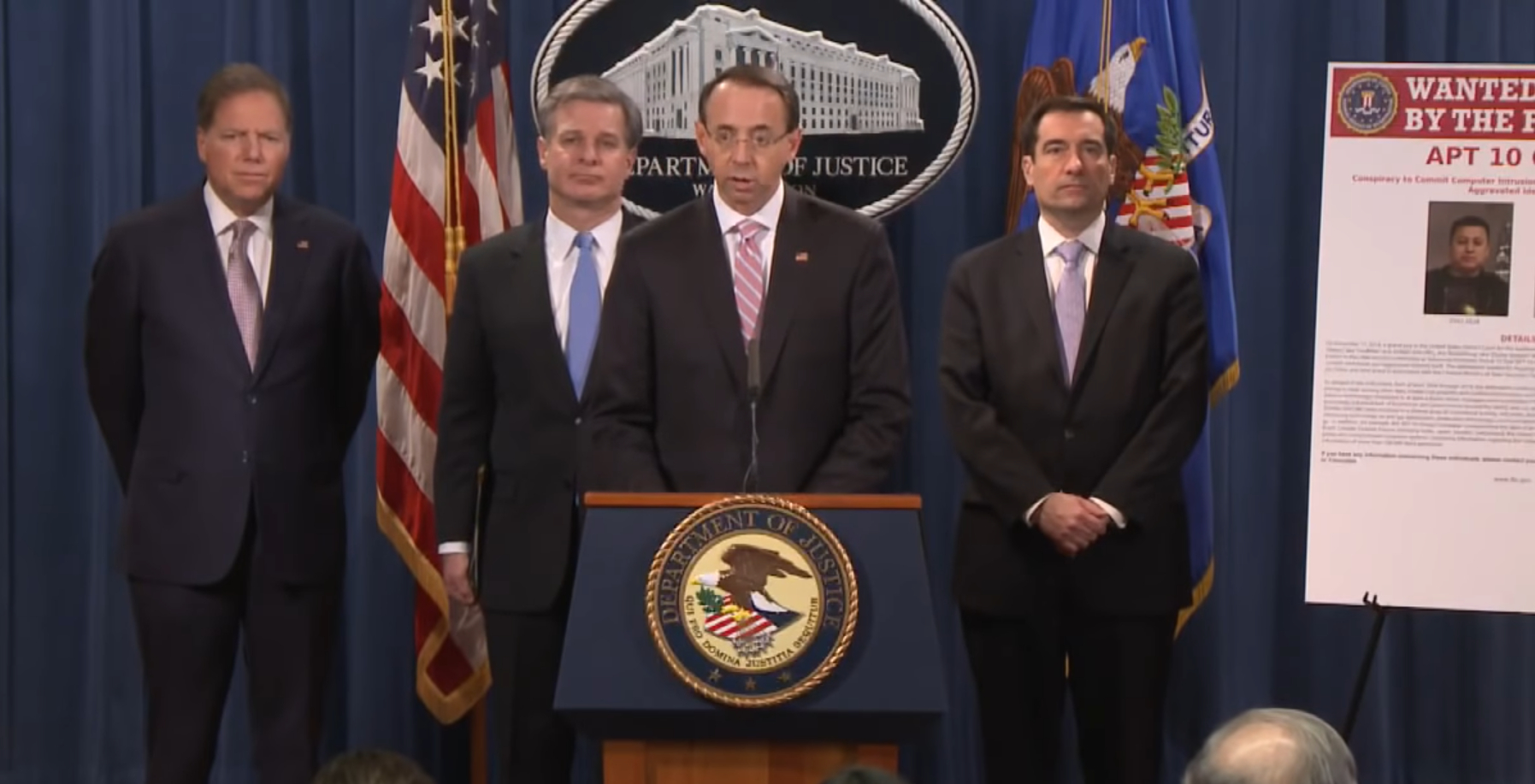
Deputy Attorney General Rod Rosenstein and Wray announce charges against Chinese government hackers, December 20, 2018

On February 13, 2018, in a Senate Select Committee on Intelligence hearing focused on Chinese espionage in the United States, Senator Marco Rubio asked Wray about the risk posed from Chinese students in advanced science and mathematics programs. In response, Wray stated "nontraditional collectors" (which he elaborated to include professors, scientists, and students) are "exploiting the very open research and development environment that we have" and consequently he viewed the risk "as not just a whole of government threat but a whole of society threat." Representatives Judy Chu, Ted Lieu, and Grace Meng released statements criticizing Wray's response as "irresponsible generalizations" implying that all Chinese students and scholars were spies. A coalition of Asian American advocacy groups wrote an open letter to Wray asking for a dialogue "to discuss how well-intentioned public policies might nonetheless lead to troubling issues of potential bias, racial profiling, and wrongful prosecution". In a follow-up interview with NBC, Wray stood by his earlier remarks: "To be clear, we do not open investigations based on race, or ethnicity, or national origin. But when we open investigations into economic espionage, time and time again, they keep leading back to China."

In July 2020, Wray called the People's Republic of China the "greatest long-term threat" to the United States. He said that "the FBI is now opening a new China-related counterintelligence case every 10 hours. Of the nearly 5,000 active counterintelligence cases currently under way across the country, almost half are related to China." Wray cited the Anthem medical data breach that exposed the personal information of more than 78 million people and the 2017 Equifax data breach that impacted more than 145 million Americans. Wray argued China was trying to become the world's only superpower, supplanting the United States.

In February 2023, Wray appeared in an interview on Fox News endorsing the theory that the COVID-19 virus may have leaked from a laboratory in China. The endorsement comes after the United States Department of Energy and the FBI both released statements saying that it was likely that the virus had come after a lab leak in China. The assessments were made with "low confidence" and "moderate confidence", respectively.

==== Russian election interference ====
On December 9, 2019, Wray was interviewed by ABC News following the release of the DoJ inspector general's report on the origins of the Russia investigation. In the interview, when asked about characterizations of the FBI and its agents as the "deep state", Wray responded, "I think that's the kind of label that's a disservice to the men and women who work at the FBI who I think tackle their jobs with professionalism, with rigor, with objectivity, with courage. So that's not a term I would ever use to describe our work force and I think it's an affront to them." He said he did not believe the Trump campaign was unfairly targeted by the FBI probe. He also denied that Ukraine interfered in the 2016 presidential elections, stating "We have no information that indicates that Ukraine interfered with the 2016 presidential election" and "as far as the [2020] election itself goes, we think Russia represents the most significant threat". This led Trump to criticize Wray the following day, claiming that Wray would "never be able to fix the FBI."

==== Arctic Frost investigation ====
In April 2022, Wray approved the opening of "Arctic Frost," a sensitive investigative matter examining alleged efforts to submit false electoral certificates following the 2020 presidential election. Attorney General Merrick Garland and Deputy Attorney General Lisa Monaco also approved the investigation, pursuant to FBI and DOJ policy for sensitive matters. The investigation was transferred to Special Counsel Jack Smith's oversight in November 2022. Documents released by Senate Judiciary Committee Chairman Chuck Grassley in October 2025 revealed the investigation had issued 197 subpoenas seeking records on approximately 430 Republican individuals and entities, including phone metadata for eight Republican senators. Republican senators characterized the investigation as politically motivated, while Jamie Raskin, the ranking Democrat on the House Judiciary Committee, stated that "phone-record subpoenas and non-disclosure orders are routine in grand jury investigations."

==== FBI Richmond Catholic memo ====
In January 2023, the FBI Richmond Field Office produced an internal memo identifying "radical traditionalist Catholics" as potential domestic violent extremists. When the memo leaked in February 2023, Wray said he was "aghast" and ordered it withdrawn. In July 2023 testimony before the House Judiciary Committee, Wray characterized it as "a single product by a single field office," but documents produced 13 days later revealed coordination between Richmond, Portland, and Los Angeles field offices. In December 2023 Senate testimony, Wray stated that all employees involved received formal admonishments affecting their compensation, but no terminations occurred under his leadership. Director Kash Patel later testified in September 2025 that there had been "terminations" and "resignations" related to the memo under his leadership. A July 2025 House Judiciary Committee report stated that over 1,300 pages of documents had been withheld from Congress during Wray's tenure.

==== Trump's second term ====
After the 2024 presidential election, president-elect Donald Trump indicated that he would fire Wray and seek to replace him with former prosecutor Kash Patel. At that time, Wray had three years left in his 10-year term. On December 11, 2024, Wray announced that he would resign at the conclusion of the Biden presidency, January 20, 2025. The Vacancies Reform Act says that if there is a vacancy in the director of the FBI (or any other Senate-confirmed position), the president must replace the person with a person who has (1) already been confirmed by the Senate or (2) a person who has served in the agency at a senior level (according to the GS-15 pay scale). Commentators have speculated as to whether the Vacancies Reform Act motivated Wray to resign as Paul Abbate (deputy director of the FBI since 2021) or some other person qualified under the Vacancies Reform Act would have to fill the position prior to a Senate confirmation of Patel.

== Personal life ==
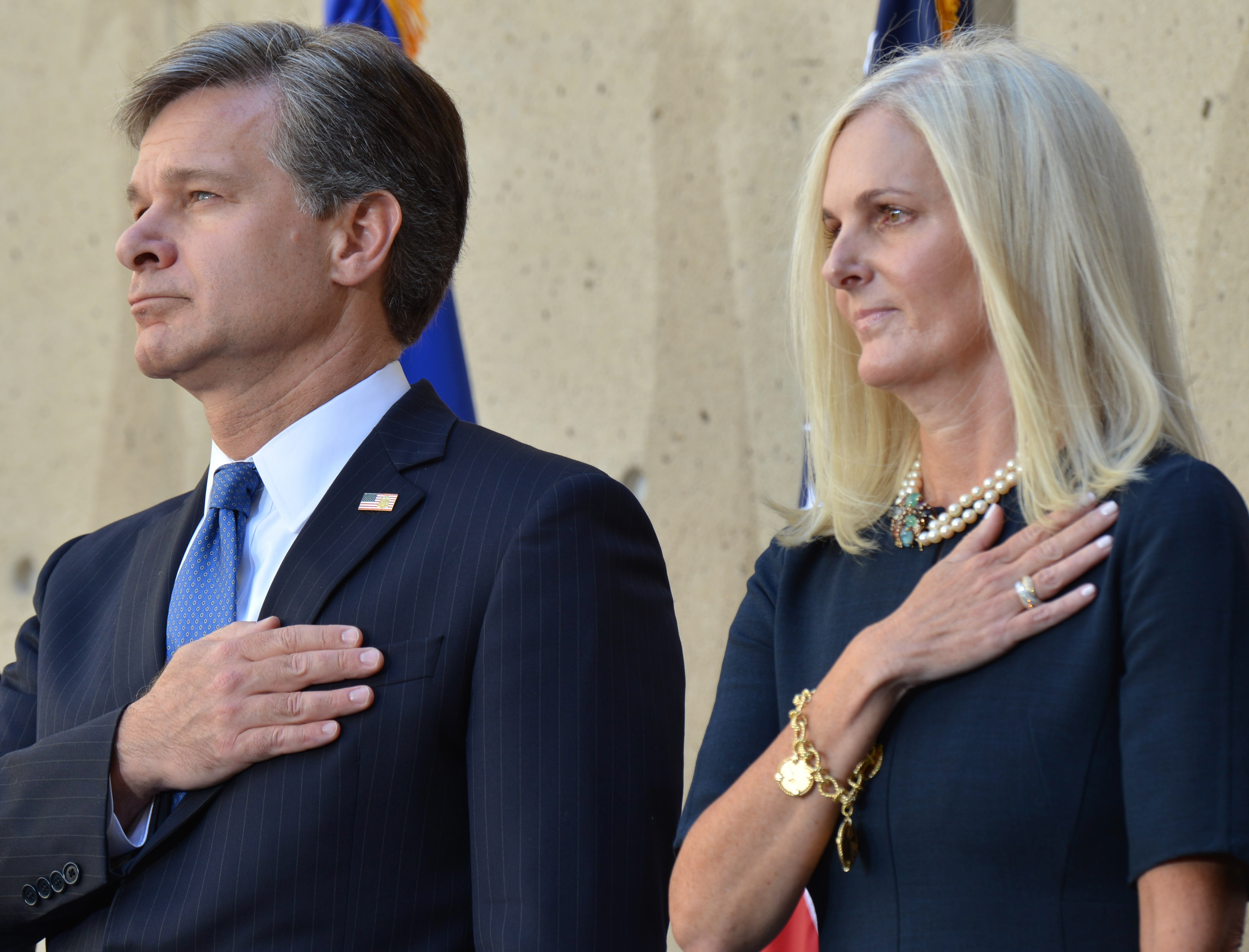
Christopher Wray and wife Helen in 2017

Wray married Helen Garrison Howell, a Yale undergraduate classmate, in 1989. They have a son, Trip, and a daughter, Caroline, and live in Georgia.

From January 2016 to July 2017, the month of his confirmation, Wray earned $9.2 million working as an attorney for the law firm King & Spalding, significantly more than his salary as FBI Director. According to a calculation from The Wall Street Journal, Wray's net worth in 2017 was estimated to be $23 million to $42 million.

Wray is a Republican and a member of the Federalist Society.

== See also ==
- Foreign electoral intervention

Legal offices
Preceded by Michael Chertoff	United States Assistant Attorney General for the Criminal Division; 2003–2005	Succeeded by Alice S. Fisher
Government offices
Preceded by Andrew McCabe; Acting	Director of the Federal Bureau of Investigation; 2017–2025	Succeeded by Paul Abbate; Acting
