= Russian interference in the 2016 United States elections =

- Part of 2016 U.S. presidential election
- ODNI declassified report Assessing Russian Activities and Intentions in Recent US Elections
- Date: May 2014 – November 8, 2016
- Also known as: Project Lakhta
- Motive: Destabilization of the United States; Election of Donald Trump
- Perpetrator: Russian government
- Outcome: Trump elected president; Mueller probe

The Russian government conducted foreign electoral interference in the 2016 United States elections with the goals of sabotaging the presidential campaign of Hillary Clinton, boosting the presidential campaign of Donald Trump, and increasing political and social discord in the United States. According to the U.S. Intelligence Community (IC), the operation—code named "Project Lakhta"—was ordered directly by Russian president Vladimir Putin. The "hacking and disinformation campaign" to damage Clinton and help Trump became the "core of the scandal known as Russiagate".

The Internet Research Agency (IRA), based in Saint Petersburg, Russia, and described as a troll farm, created thousands of social media accounts that purported to be Americans supporting Trump and opposing Clinton. Fabricated articles and disinformation from Russian government-controlled media were promoted on social media, where they reached millions of users between 2013 and 2017.

Hackers affiliated with the Russian military intelligence service (GRU) infiltrated information systems of the Democratic National Committee (DNC), the Democratic Congressional Campaign Committee (DCCC), and Clinton campaign officials, and publicly released stolen files and emails during the election campaign. Individuals connected to Russia contacted Trump campaign associates, offering business opportunities and proffering damaging information on Clinton. The Russian government has denied involvement in any of the hacks or leaks, and Donald Trump has denied any interference occurred at all. However, some prominent Russian figures, most notably the IRA founder, Yevgeny Prigozhin, have admitted to their participation in the interference operation.

The campaign was first disclosed publicly by members of the United States Congress in September 2016. The immediate U.S. response included strong statements from the country's intelligence agencies, a direct warning by then-U.S. president Barack Obama to Putin, renewed economic sanctions against Russia, and closures of Russian diplomatic facilities and expulsion of their staff.

The first major government investigation into the campaign, Crossfire Hurricane, was launched by the Federal Bureau of Investigation (FBI) in July 2016. In addition to examining the campaign itself, investigators began probling potential links and coordination between Trump associates and Russian officials. However, the investigation was brought to an abrupt halt when President Trump dismissed FBI director James Comey in May 2017. At first, Trump stated Comey's firing was motivated by his participation in the investigation. However, after the McCabe memo renewed suspicion of Russia collusion, Trump walked back his earlier comments, tweeting he "never fired James Comey because of Russia."

In response to public outcry after Comey's firing, Deputy Attorney General Rod Rosenstein authorized a special counsel investigation, led by former FBI director Robert Mueller, to continue Crossfire Hurricane's work. Over the course of the investigation, twenty-six Russian citizens and three Russian organizations would be indicted by Mueller and his team. The investigation also led to indictments and convictions of Trump campaign officials and associated Americans.

Their final report, released in April 2019, concluded that Russian interference was "sweeping and systematic" and "violated U.S. criminal law". It also found that, though the Trump campaign welcomed Russia's activities, there was insufficient evidence to bring criminal "conspiracy" or "coordination" charges against Trump or his associates. However, they did note that Roger Stone, a Trump associate, "appeared to know in advance" about the imminent publication of certain hacked emails, even though the investigators "'did not have sufficient evidence' to prove active participation in the hacks."

Simultaneously, the Republican-led Senate and House Intelligence Committees conducted their own investigations into the Russians' activities. The Senate committee's report, released in five volumes between July 2019 and August 2020, found that the Russian government had engaged in an "extensive campaign" to sabotage the election in favor of Trump, which included assistance from some of Trump's own advisers. They also found that the IC's initial assessment was "coherent and well-constructed", and that IC analysts had experienced "no politically motivated pressure to reach specific conclusions".

In response to the investigations, Trump, Republican Party leaders, and right-wing conservatives have promoted and endorsed false and debunked conspiracy theory counter-narratives in an effort to discredit the allegations and findings of the investigations, frequently referring to them as the "Russia hoax" or "Russian collusion hoax". (Note: Not a hoax)

== Background and Russian actors ==
Prior to its demise in 1991, the government of the Soviet Union had interfered in United States elections, including the elections of 1960 and 1984. Conversely, there was American influence in the Russian election of 1996. Thus, the Russian influence operation in 2016 was not entirely without precedent, though its techniques and scope were different.

=== Prior Russian election interference in Ukraine ===
The 2014 Ukrainian presidential election was disrupted by cyberattacks over several days, including the release of hacked emails, attempted alteration of vote tallies, and distributed denial-of-service attacks to delay the final result. They were found to have been launched by pro-Russian hackers.

Malware that would have displayed a graphic declaring far-right candidate Dmytro Yarosh the electoral winner was removed from Ukraine's Central Election Commission less than an hour before polls closed. Despite this, Channel One Russia falsely reported that Yarosh had won, broadcasting the same fake graphic that had been planted on the election commission's website. Political scientist Peter Ordeshook said in 2017, "These faked results were geared for a specific audience in order to feed the Russian narrative that has claimed from the start that ultra-nationalists and Nazis were behind the [2014] revolution in Ukraine."

The same Sofacy malware used in the Central Election Commission hack was later found on the servers of the Democratic National Committee (DNC). Around the same time as Russia's attempt to hack the 2014 elections, the Obama administration received a report suggesting that the Kremlin was building a disinformation program which could be used to interfere in Western politics.

=== Vladimir Putin ===
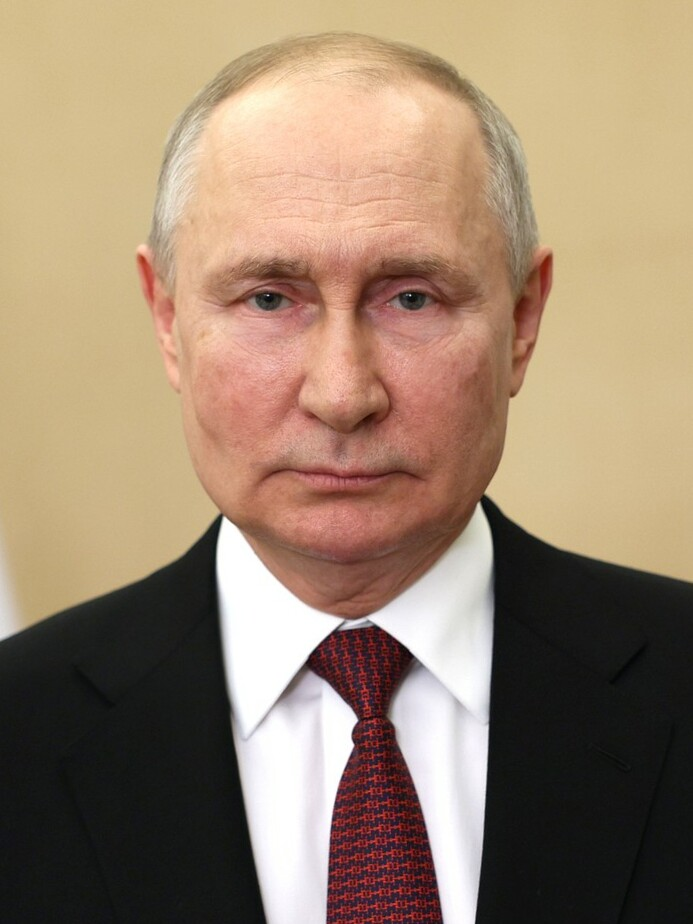
American intelligence agencies concluded that Russian president Vladimir Putin personally ordered the covert operation, code named Project Lakhta, while Putin denied the allegations. At the 2018 Helsinki summit, Putin said that he wanted Trump to win because he talked about normalizing the U.S.–Russia relationship.

In December 2016, two unidentified senior intelligence officials told several U.S. news media outlets (Note: Similar reports were published by ABC News, CBS News, NBC News, and Reuters.) that they were highly confident that the operation to interfere in the 2016 presidential election was personally directed by Vladimir Putin. Under Putin's direction, the goals of the operation are reported to have evolved from first undermining American trust in their own democracy to undermining Hillary Clinton's campaign, and by the fall of 2016 to directly helping Trump's campaign, possibly because Putin believed Trump would ease various sanctions against Russia. Her presidential campaign's Russia policy advisor was Richard Lourie.

The officials believe Putin became personally involved after Russia accessed the DNC computers, because such an operation would require high-level government approval. White House press secretary Josh Earnest and Obama foreign policy advisor and speechwriter Ben Rhodes agreed with this assessment, with Rhodes saying operations of this magnitude required Putin's consent.

The Russian election interference operation was code named "Project Lakhta" and ordered directly by Putin. The CIA had been told by an agent it had recruited years ago. Oleg Smolenkov was a longtime aide to Yuri Ushakov and smuggled out of Russia by the CIA in 2017. Putin, when asked if he wanted "President Trump to win the election", replied: "Yes, I did. Yes, I did. Because he talked about bringing the U.S.-Russia relationship back to normal." This was not a mere wish, as the Kremlin papers revealed that in January 2016, Putin authorized intensive measures to make sure Trump was elected.

In January 2017, the Office of the Director of National Intelligence, delivered a declassified report, (representing the work of the FBI, the CIA and the NSA) with a similar conclusion:

President Vladimir Putin ordered an influence campaign in 2016 aimed at the U.S. presidential election. Russia's goals were to undermine public faith in the U.S. democratic process, denigrate Secretary Clinton, and harm her electability and potential presidency. We further assess Putin and the Russian Government developed a clear preference for president-elect Trump. We have high confidence in these judgments.

Putin blamed Clinton for the 2011–2012 mass protests in Russia against his rule, according to the report (Clinton was U.S. secretary of state at the time). FBI director James Comey also has testified that Putin disliked Clinton and preferred her opponent, and Clinton herself has accused Putin of having a grudge against her. Michael McFaul, who was U.S. ambassador to Russia, said the operation could be a retaliation by Putin against Clinton. Russian security expert Andrei Soldatov has said, "[The Kremlin] believes that with Clinton in the White House it will be almost impossible to lift sanctions against Russia. So it is a very important question for Putin personally. This is a question of national security."

Russian officials have denied the allegations multiple times. In June 2016, Kremlin spokesman Dmitry Peskov denied any connection of Russia to the DNC hacks. In December 2016, when U.S. intelligence officials publicly accused Putin of being directly involved in the covert operation, Russian foreign minister Sergey Lavrov said he was "astonished" by this "nonsense". Putin also has denied any Kremlin involvement in the election campaign, though in June 2017 he told journalists that "patriotically minded" Russian hackers may have been responsible for the campaign cyberattacks against the U.S., and in 2018 he stated that he had wanted Trump to win the election "because he talked about bringing the U.S.-Russia relationship back to normal."

=== U.S. counter-disinformation team ===
The United States Department of State planned to use a unit formed with the intention of combating disinformation from the Russian government, but it was disbanded in September 2015 after department heads missed the scope of propaganda before the 2016 U.S. election.

The unit had been in development for eight months prior to being scrapped. Titled the Counter-Disinformation Team, it would have been a reboot of the Active Measures Working Group set up by the Reagan Administration. It was created under the Bureau of International Information Programs. Work began in 2014, with the intention of countering propaganda from Russian sources such as TV network RT (formerly called Russia Today). A beta website was ready, and staff were hired by the U.S. State Department for the unit prior to its cancellation.

U.S. Intelligence officials explained to former National Security Agency analyst and counterintelligence officer John R. Schindler writing in The New York Observer (published at the time by Jared Kushner) that the Obama Administration decided to cancel the unit, as they were afraid of antagonizing Russia. A State Department representative told the International Business Times after being contacted regarding the closure of the unit, that the U.S. was disturbed by propaganda from Russia, and believed the strongest defense was sincere communication. U.S. undersecretary of state for public diplomacy Richard Stengel was the point person for the unit before it was canceled. Stengel had written in 2014 that Russian news channel RT was engaged in a disinformation campaign about Ukraine.

=== Russian Institute for Strategic Studies ===
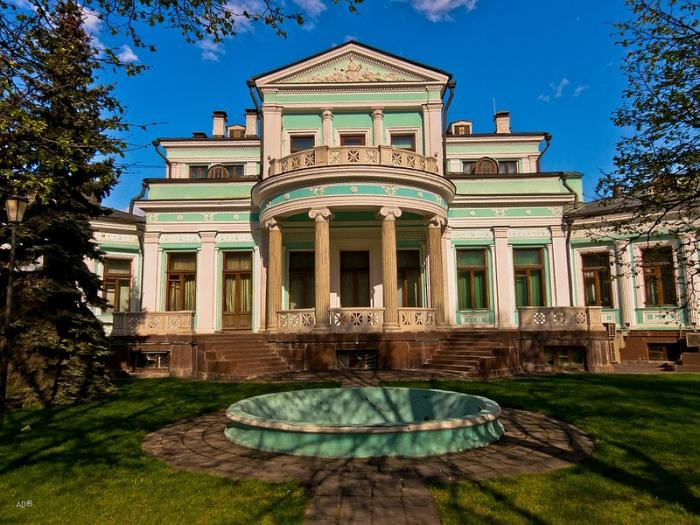
The Russian Institute for Strategic Studies began working for the Russian presidency after 2009.

In April 2017, news agency Reuters cited several unnamed U.S. officials as having stated that the Russian Institute for Strategic Studies (RISS) had developed a strategy to sway the U.S. election to Donald Trump and, failing that, to disillusion voters. The development of strategy was allegedly ordered by Putin and directed by former officers of the Russian Foreign Intelligence Service (SVR), retired SVR general Leonid Petrovich Reshetnikov being head of the RISS at the time. The Institute had been a part of the SVR until 2009, whereafter it has worked for the Russian Presidential Administration.

The U.S. officials said the propaganda efforts began in March 2016. The first set of recommendations, issued in June 2016, proposed that Russia support a candidate for U.S. president more favorable to Russia than Obama had been, via Russia-backed news outlets and a social media campaign. It supported Trump until October, when another conclusion was made that Hillary Clinton was likely to win, and the strategy should be modified to work to undermine U.S. voters' faith in their electoral system and a Clinton presidency by alleging voter fraud in the election. RISS director Mikhail Fradkov and Kremlin spokesman Dmitry Peskov denied the allegations.

=== Preparation ===
According to a February 2018 criminal indictment, more than two years before the election, two Russian women obtained visas for what the indictment alleged was a three-week reconnaissance tour of the United States, including battleground states such as Colorado, Michigan, Nevada and New Mexico, to gather intelligence on American politics. The 2018 indictment alleged that another Russian operative visited Atlanta in November 2014 on a similar mission.

In order to establish American identities for individuals and groups within specific social media communities, hundreds of email, PayPal and bank accounts and fraudulent driver's licenses were created for fictitious Americans—and sometimes real Americans whose Social Security numbers had been stolen.

== Social media and Internet trolls ==
According to the special counsel investigation's Mueller Report (officially named "Report on the Investigation into Russian Interference in the 2016 Presidential Election"), the first method of Russian interference used the Internet Research Agency (IRA), a Kremlin-linked troll farm, to wage "a social media campaign that favored presidential candidate Donald J. Trump and disparaged presidential candidate Hillary Clinton". The Internet Research Agency also sought to "provoke and amplify political and social discord in the United States".

By February 2016, internal IRA documents showed an order to support the candidacies of Donald Trump and Bernie Sanders, while IRA members were to "use any opportunity to criticize" Hillary Clinton and the rest of the candidates.

=== Posts on social media by Russian-linked accounts ===
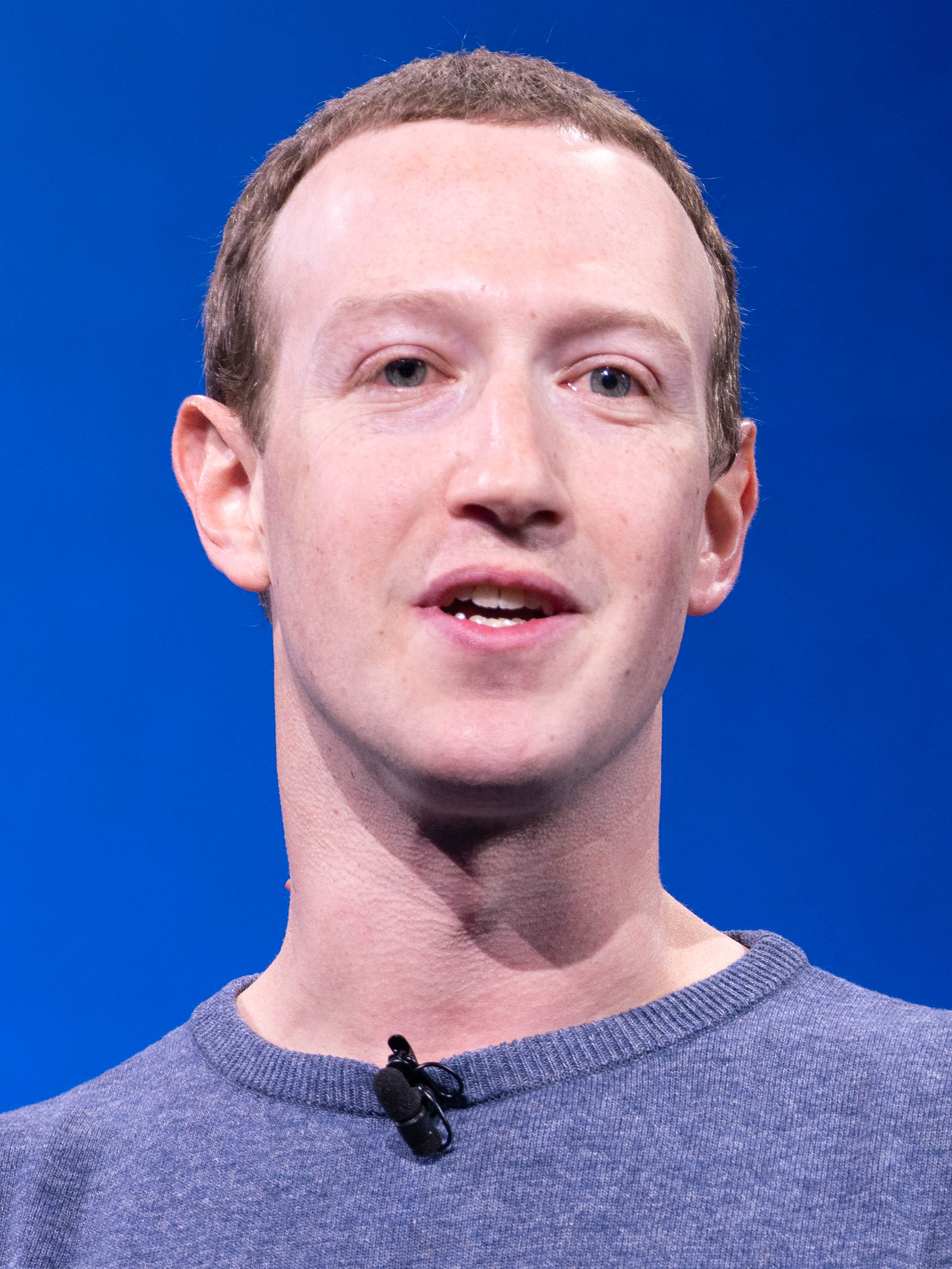
Initially in 2016 Facebook CEO Mark Zuckerberg said, "I think the idea that fake news on Facebook influenced the election in any way, I think is a pretty crazy idea."

Russian use of social media to disseminate propaganda content was very broad. Facebook and Twitter were used, but also Reddit, Tumblr, Pinterest, Medium, YouTube, Vine, and Google+ (among other sites). Instagram was by far the most used platform, and one that largely remained out of the public eye until late 2018.

The Mueller report lists IRA-created groups on Facebook including "purported conservative groups" (e.g. 'Tea Party News'), "purported Black social justice groups" (e.g. 'Blacktivist'), "LGBTQ groups" ('LGBT United'), and "religious groups" ('United Muslims of America'). The IRA Twitter accounts included @TEN_GOP (claiming to be related to the Tennessee Republican Party), @jenn_abrams and @Pamela_Moore13; both claimed to be Trump supporters and both had 70,000 followers.

(By 2017 the U.S. news media was focusing on the Russian operations on Facebook and Twitter and Russian operatives moved on to Instagram.) The Mueller Report found the IRA spent $100,000 for more than 3,500 Facebook advertisements from June 2015 to May 2017, which included anti-Clinton and pro-Trump advertisements. In comparison, Clinton and Trump campaigns spent $81 million on Facebook ads, but the IRA "likely was able to squeeze more impressions and engagement out of each dollar of spend than Trump and Clinton’s ads".

Several Trump campaign members (Donald J. Trump Jr., Eric Trump, Kellyanne Conway, Brad Parscale and Michael T. Flynn) linked or reposted material from the IRA's @TEN_GOP Twitter account listed above. Other people who responded to IRA social media accounts include Michael McFaul, Sean Hannity, Roger Stone and Michael Flynn Jr.

=== Other tactics used during influence campaign ===
Fabricated articles and disinformation were spread from Russian government-controlled outlets such as RT and Sputnik to be popularized on pro-Russian accounts on Twitter and other social media. Researchers have compared Russian tactics during the 2016 U.S. election to the "active measures" of the Soviet Union during the Cold War, but made easier by the use of social media.

From June 2016, the IRA organized election rallies in the U.S. "often promoting" Trump's campaign while "opposing" Clinton's campaign. The IRA posed as Americans, hiding their Russian background, while asking Trump campaign members for campaign buttons, flyers, and posters for the rallies.

Advertisements bought by Russian operatives for the Facebook social media site are estimated to have reached 10 million users.

=== Influence campaign themes ===
Monitoring 7,000 pro-Trump social media accounts over a 2 1/2-year period, researchers J.M. Berger, Andrew Weisburd and Clint Watts found the accounts denigrated critics of Russian activities in Syria and propagated falsehoods about Clinton's health. Watts found Russian propaganda to be aimed at fomenting "dissent or conspiracies against the U.S. government and its institutions", and by autumn of 2016 amplifying attacks on Clinton and support for Trump, via social media, Internet trolls, botnets, and websites.

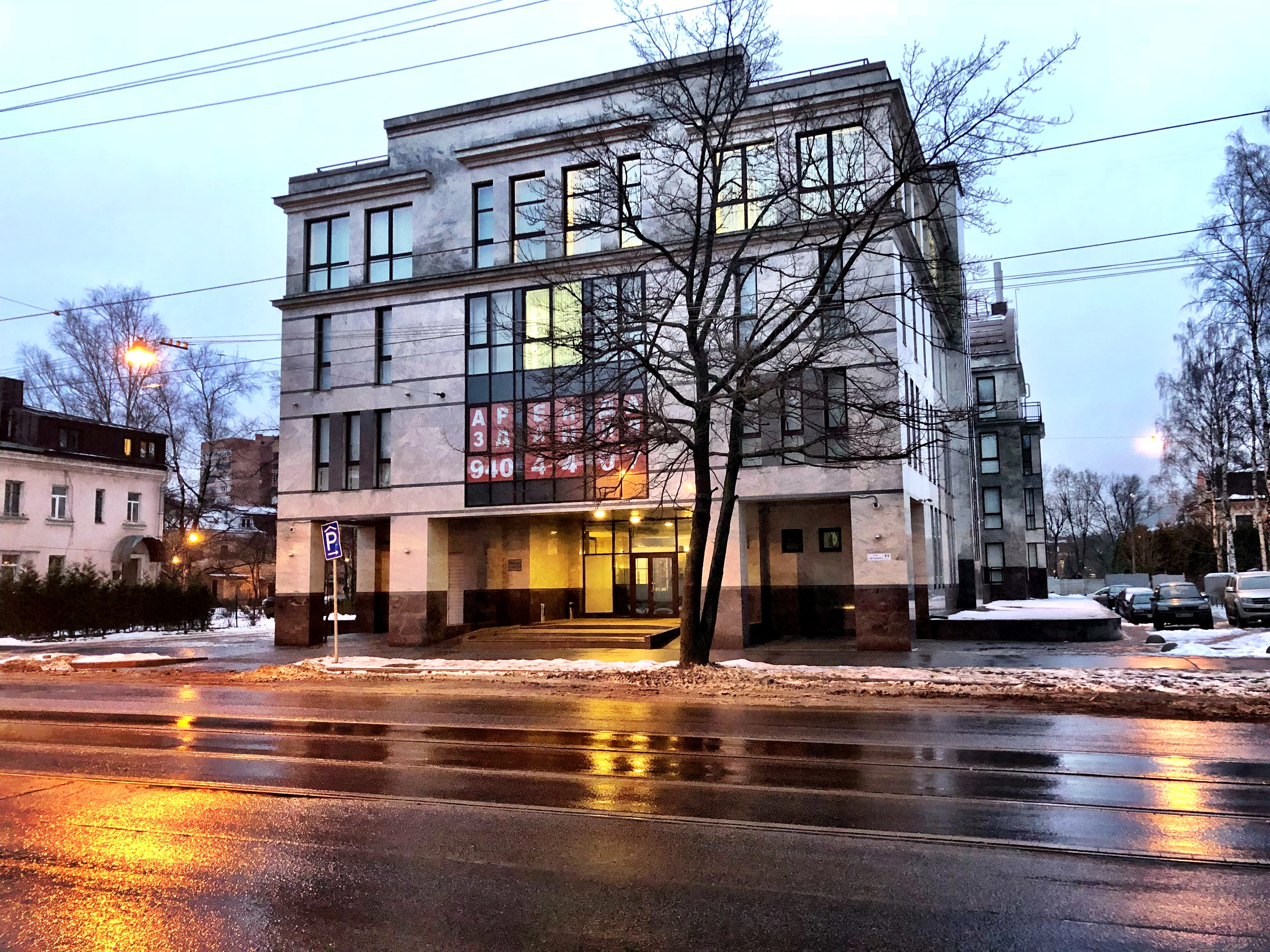
Former site of the Internet Research Agency in Saint Petersburg, Russia

Monitoring news on Twitter directed at Michigan prior to the election, Philip N. Howard found about half of it fabricated or untrue; the other half came from real news sources. In continued analysis after the election, Howard and other researchers found the most prominent methods of misinformation were ostensibly "organic posting, not advertisements", and influence operation activity increased after the 2016 and was not limited to the election.

=== Initial response by social media platforms ===
Facebook originally denied that fake news on their platform had influenced the election and had insisted it was unaware of any Russian-financed advertisements. However, it later admitted that about 126 million Americans may have seen posts published by Russia-based operatives. The company was criticized for failing to stop fake news from spreading on its platform during the 2016 election. Facebook originally thought that the fake-news problem could be solved by engineering, but in May 2017 it announced plans to hire 3,000 content reviewers.

In September 2017, Facebook told congressional investigators it had discovered that hundreds of fake accounts linked to a Russian troll farm had bought $100,000 in advertisements targeting the 2016 U.S. election audience. The ads, which ran between June 2015 and May 2017, primarily focused on divisive social issues; roughly 25% were geographically targeted. Facebook has also turned over information about the Russian-related ad buys to Special Counsel Robert Mueller. Approximately 3,000 adverts were involved, and these were viewed by between four and five million Facebook users prior to the election. On November 1, 2017, the House Intelligence Committee released a sample of Facebook ads and pages that had been financially linked to the Internet Research Agency.

=== Impact ===
According to an analysis by BuzzFeed News, the "20 top-performing false election stories from hoax sites and hyperpartisan blogs generated 8,711,000 shares, reactions, and comments on Facebook." A 2019 analysis by The Washington Post's "Outlook" reviewed a number of troll accounts active in 2016 and 2018, and found that many resembled organic users. Rather than wholly negative and obvious, many confirmed troll accounts deployed humor and were "astute in exploiting questions of culture and identity and are frequently among the first to push new divisive conversations", some of which moved quickly to mainstream print media.

In 2017, Jonathan Albright, research director for the Tow Center for Digital Journalism at Columbia University, led an investigation into the behaviour of the 470 Facebook accounts that had been confirmed to have been created by Russians during the 2016 campaign. His team found that six of these accounts generated content that was shared at least 340 million times.

In January 2023, a study from New York University's Center for Social Media and Politics about the influence of Russian trolls on Twitter found they had little influence on 2016 voters' attitudes, polarization, or voting behavior. The study was limited to Twitter and did not examine other social media, such as the much larger Facebook. It did not address the Russian hack-and-leak operations: "Another major study in 2018 by University of Pennsylvania communications professor Kathleen Hall Jamieson suggested those probably played a significant role in the 2016 race's outcome. Lastly, it doesn't suggest that foreign influence operations aren't a threat at all." It found that voters who were already favorably disposed to Trump were exposed the most. "Only 1 percent of Twitter users accounted for 70 percent of the exposure to accounts that Twitter identified as Russian troll accounts. Highly partisan Republicans were exposed to nine times more posts than non-Republicans."

== Cyberattack on Democrats ==
Hillary Clinton at the 2016 Democratic National Convention

According to the Mueller Report, the second method of Russian interference saw the Russian intelligence service, the GRU, hacking into email accounts owned by volunteers and employees of the Clinton presidential campaign, including that of campaign chairman John Podesta, and also hacking into "the computer networks of the Democratic Congressional Campaign Committee (DCCC) and the Democratic National Committee (DNC)". As a result, the GRU obtained hundreds of thousands of hacked documents, and the GRU proceeded by arranging releases of damaging hacked material via the WikiLeaks organization and also GRU's personas "DCLeaks" and "Guccifer 2.0".

Starting in March 2016, the Russian military intelligence agency GRU sent "spearphishing" emails targeted more than 300 individuals affiliated with the Democratic Party or the Clinton campaign, according to the Special Counsel's July 13, 2018 Indictment. Using malware to explore the computer networks of the DNC and DCCC, they harvested tens of thousands of emails and attachments and deleted computer logs and files to obscure evidence of their activities. These were saved and released in stages to the public during the three months before the 2016 election. Some were released strategically to distract the public from media events that were either beneficial to the Clinton campaign or harmful to Trump's.

The first tranche of 19,000 emails and 8,000 attachments was released on July 22, 2016, three days before the Democratic convention. The resulting news coverage created the impression that the Democratic National Committee was biased against Clinton's Democratic primary challenger Bernie Sanders (who received 43% of votes cast in the Democratic presidential primaries) and forced DNC Chairwoman Debbie Wasserman Schultz to resign, disrupting the plans of the Clinton campaign. A second tranche was released on October 7, a few hours after the Obama Administration released a statement by the Department of Homeland Security and the director of National Intelligence accusing the Russian government of interfering in the election through hacking, and just 29 minutes after The Washington Post reported on the Access Hollywood videotape where Trump boasted about grabbing women "by the pussy". The stolen documents effectively distracted media and voter attention from both stories.

Stolen emails and documents were given both to platforms created by hackers—a website called DCLeaks and a persona called Guccifer 2.0 claiming to be a lone hacker—and to an unidentified organization believed to be WikiLeaks. (The Russians registered the domain dcleaks.com, using principally Bitcoin to pay for the domain and the hosting.)

=== Podesta hack ===
John Podesta, chairman of Hillary Clinton's presidential campaign, received a phishing email on March 19, 2016, sent by Russian operatives purporting to alert him of a "compromise in the system", and urging him to change his password "immediately" by clicking on a link. This allowed Russian hackers to access around 60,000 emails from Podesta's private account.

John Podesta, later told Meet the Press that the FBI spoke to him only once regarding his hacked emails and that he had not been sure what had been taken until a month before the election on October 7 "when [WikiLeaks' Julian] Assange ... started dumping them out and said they would all dump out, that's when I knew that they had the contents of my email account."

The WikiLeaks October 7 dump started less than an hour after The Washington Post released the Donald Trump and Billy Bush recording Access Hollywood tape, WikiLeaks announced on Twitter that it was in possession of 50,000 of Podesta's emails, and a few hours after the Obama Administration released a statement by the Department of Homeland Security and the director of national intelligence stating "The U.S. Intelligence Community (USIC) is confident that the Russian Government directed the recent compromises of e-mails from U.S. persons and institutions, including from U.S. political organizations."

It initially released 2,050 of these. The cache included emails containing transcripts of Clinton's paid speeches to Wall Street banks, controversial comments from staffers about Catholic voters, infighting among employees of the Clinton campaign, as well as potential vice-presidential picks for Clinton. The Clinton campaign did not confirm or deny the authenticity of the emails but emphasized they were stolen and distributed by parties hostile to Clinton and that "top national security officials" had stated "that documents can be faked as part of a sophisticated Russian misinformation campaign."

Podesta's e-mails, once released by WikiLeaks, formed the basis for Pizzagate, a debunked conspiracy theory that falsely posited that Podesta and other Democratic Party officials were involved in a child trafficking ring based out of pizzerias in Washington, D.C.

=== DNC hack ===
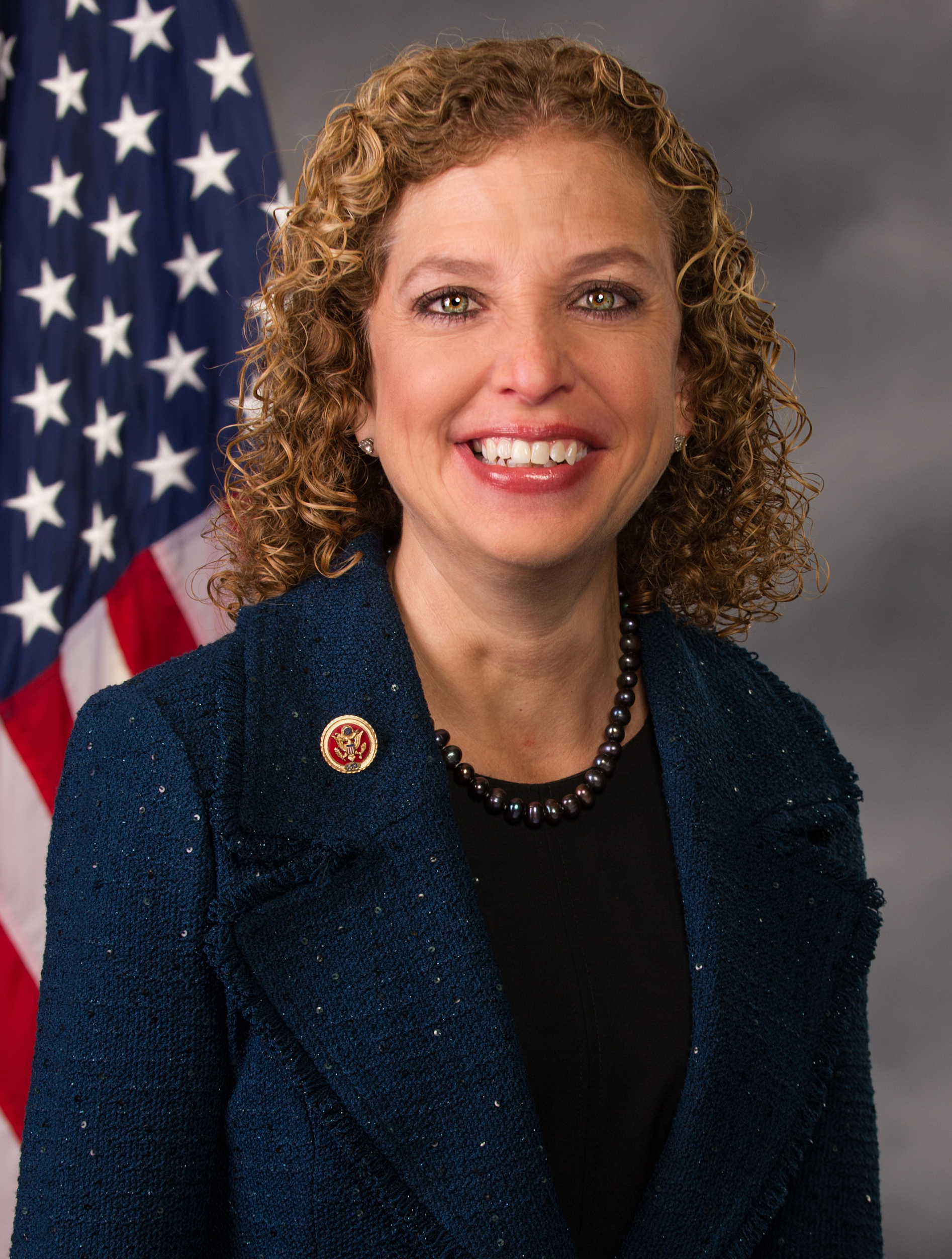
Debbie Wasserman Schultz resigned her position as chairperson of the DNC.

The United States Intelligence Community concluded by January 2017 that the GRU (using the names Cozy Bear and Fancy Bear) had gained access to the computer network of the Democratic National Committee (DNC)—the formal governing body of the Democratic Party—in July 2015 and maintained it until at least June 2016, when they began leaking the stolen information via the Guccifer 2.0 online persona, DCLeaks.com and Wikileaks. Debbie Wasserman Schultz resigned as DNC chairwoman following the release of e-mails by WikiLeaks that showed DNC officials discussing Bernie Sanders and his presidential campaign in a derisive and derogatory manner. Emails leaked included personal information about Democratic Party donors, with credit card and Social Security numbers, emails by Wasserman Schultz calling a Sanders campaign official a "damn liar".

Following the July 22 publication of a large number of hacked emails by WikiLeaks, the FBI announced that it would investigate the theft of DNC emails.

==== Intelligence analysis of attack ====
In June and July 2016, cybersecurity experts and firms, including CrowdStrike, Fidelis, FireEye, Mandiant, SecureWorks, Symantec and ThreatConnect, stated the DNC email leaks were part of a series of cyberattacks on the DNC committed by two Russian intelligence groups, called Fancy Bear and Cozy Bear, also known respectively as APT28 and APT29 / The Dukes. ThreatConnect also noted possible links between the DC Leaks project and Russian intelligence operations because of a similarity with Fancy Bear attack patterns. SecureWorks added that the actor group was operating from Russia on behalf of the Russian government. de Volkskrant later reported that Dutch intelligence agency AIVD had penetrated the Russian hacking group Cozy Bear in 2014, and observed them in 2015 hack the State Department in real time, while capturing pictures of the hackers via a security camera in their workspace. American, British, and Dutch intelligence services had also observed stolen DNC emails on Russian military intelligence networks.

==== Intelligence reaction and indictment ====
On October 7, 2016, Secretary Johnson and Director Clapper issued a joint statement that the intelligence community is confident the Russian Government directed the recent compromises of e-mails from U.S. persons and institutions, including from U.S. political organizations, and that the disclosures of hacked e-mails on sites like DCLeaks.com and WikiLeaks are consistent with the Russian-directed efforts.

In the July 2018 indictment by the Justice Department of twelve Russian GRU intelligence officials posing as "a Guccifer 2.0 persona" for conspiring to interfere in the 2016 elections was for hacking into computers of the Clinton campaign, the Democratic National Committee, state election boards, and secretaries of several states. The indictment describes "a sprawling and sustained cyberattack on at least three hundred people connected to the Democratic Party and the Clinton campaign". The leaked stolen files were released "in stages", a tactic wreaking "havoc on the Democratic Party throughout much of the election season."

One collection of data that hackers obtained and that may have become a "devastating weapon" against the Clinton campaign was the campaign's data analytics and voter-turnout models, extremely useful in targeting messages to "key constituencies" that Clinton needed to mobilize. These voters were later bombarded by Russian operatives with negative information about Clinton on social media.

==== WikiLeaks and Assange ====
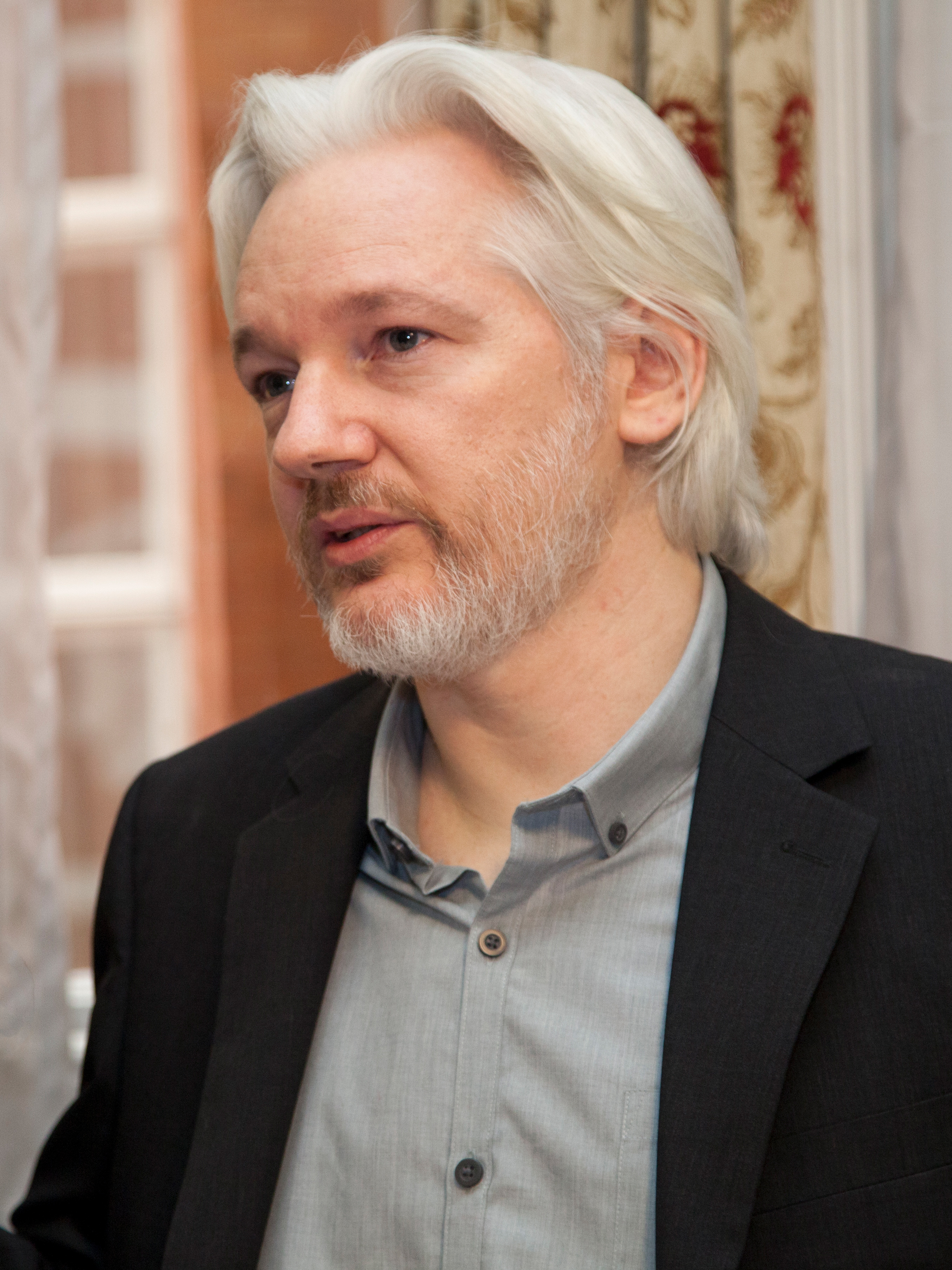
WikiLeaks founder Julian Assange

In April 2017, CIA director Mike Pompeo said WikiLeaks was a hostile intelligence agency aided by foreign states including Russia, and that the U.S. intelligence community concluded that Russia's "propaganda outlet", RT, had conspired with WikiLeaks.

WikiLeaks and its founder Julian Assange have made a number of statements denying that the Russian government was the source of the material. However, an anonymous CIA official said that Russian officials transferred the hacked e-mails to WikiLeaks using "a circuitous route" from Russia's military intelligence services (GRU) to WikiLeaks via third parties. The London bureau chief of RT visited Assange in the Ecuadorian embassy and handed him over a USB flash drive.

In a leaked private message on Twitter, Assange wrote that in the 2016 election "it would be much better for GOP to win", and that Hillary Clinton was a "sadistic sociopath".

On 16 August 2017, US Republican congressman Dana Rohrabacher visited Assange and told him that Trump would pardon him on condition that he would agree to say that Russia was not involved in the 2016 Democratic National Committee email leaks. At his extradition hearings in 2020, Assange's defence team alleged in court that this offer was made "on instructions from the president". Trump and Rohrabacher subsequently said they had never spoken about the offer and Rohrabacher said he had made the offer on his own initiative.

==== Hacking of Congressional candidates ====
Hillary Clinton was not the only Democrat attacked. Caches of Democratic Congressional Campaign Committee documents stolen by "Guccifer 2.0" were also released to reporters and bloggers around the U.S. As one Democratic candidate put it, "Our entire internal strategy plan was made public, and suddenly all this material was out there and could be used against me." The New York Times noted, "The seats that Guccifer 2.0 targeted in the document dumps were hardly random: They were some of the most competitive House races in the country."

===== Hacking of Republicans =====
On January 10, 2017, FBI director James Comey told the Senate Intelligence Committee that Russia succeeded in "collecting some information from Republican-affiliated targets but did not leak it to the public". In earlier statements, an FBI official stated Russian attempts to access the RNC server were unsuccessful, or had reportedly told the RNC chair that their servers were secure, but that email accounts of individual Republicans (including Colin Powell) were breached. (Over 200 emails from Colin Powell were posted on the website DC Leaks.) One state Republican Party (Illinois) may have had some of its email accounts hacked.

===== Civil DNC lawsuit against Russian Federation =====
On April 20, 2018, the Democratic National Committee filed a civil lawsuit in federal court in New York, accusing the Russian Government, the Trump campaign, WikiLeaks, and others of conspiracy to alter the course of the 2016 presidential election and asking for monetary damages and a declaration admitting guilt. The lawsuit was dismissed by the judge, because New York "does not recognize the specific tort claims pressed in the suit"; the judge did not make a finding on whether there was or was not "collusion between defendants and Russia during the 2016 presidential election".

===== Calls by Trump for Russians to hack or find Clinton's deleted emails =====
At a news conference on July 27, 2016, Trump publicly called on Russia to hack and release Hillary Clinton's deleted emails from her private server during her tenure in the State Department.

Russia, if you're listening, I hope you're able to find the 30,000 emails that are missing, I think you will probably be rewarded mightily by our press.

Trump's comment was condemned by the press and political figures, including some Republicans; he replied that he had been speaking sarcastically. Later that same day, Trump elaborated in a tweet:

If Russia or any other country or person has Hillary Clinton's 33,000 illegally deleted emails, perhaps they should share them with the FBI!

Several Democratic senators said Trump's comments appeared to violate the Logan Act, and Harvard Law School professor Laurence Tribe added that Trump's call could be treasonous.

The July 2018 federal indictment of Russian GRU agents said that the first, and unsuccessful, attempt by Russian hackers to infiltrate the computer servers inside Clinton's offices took place on the same day (July 27, 2016) Trump made his "Russia if you're listening" appeal. While no direct link with Trump's remark was alleged in the indictment, journalist Jane Mayer called the timing "striking".

Trump asserted in March 2019 that he had been joking when he made the remark. Katy Tur of NBC News had interviewed Trump immediately after the 2016 remark, noting she gave him an opportunity to characterize it as a joke, but he did not.

== Targeting of important voting blocs and institutions ==
In her analysis of the Russian influence on the 2016 election, Kathleen Hall Jamieson argues that Russians aligned themselves with the "geographic and demographic objectives" of the Trump campaign, using trolls, social media, and hacked information to target certain important constituencies.

=== Attempts to suppress African American votes and spread alienation ===
According to Vox, the Russian Internet Research Agency (IRA) focused on the culture of Muslims, Christians, Texas, and LGBTQ people, to engage those communities as part of a broader strategy to deepen social and political divisions within the U.S., but no other group received as much attention as Black Americans, whose voter turnout has been historically crucial to the election of Democrats. Russia's influence campaign used an array of tactics aiming to reduce their vote for Hillary Clinton, according to a December 2018 report (The Tactics & Tropes of the Internet Research Agency) commissioned by the Senate Intelligence Committee.

A total 30 Facebook pages targeting Black Americans and 10 YouTube channels that posted 571 videos related to police violence against African Americans. The covertly Russian Instagram account @blackstagram had more than 300,000 followers. A variety of Facebook pages targeting African Americans and later determined to be Russian amassed a total of 1.2 million individual followers, the report found. The Facebook page for (the Russian) Blacktivist, garnered more hits than Black Lives Matter's (non-Russian) Facebook page.

Influence operations included recruiting typically unknowing assets who would stage events and spread content from Russian influencers, spreading videos of police abuse and spreading misleading information about how to vote and whom to vote for. The attempt to target Black Americans has been compared to the KGB's attempt to foster racial tensions during Operation INFEKTION.

=== Arousing conservative voters ===
At least 25 social media pages drawing 1.4 million followers were created by Russian agents to target the American political right and promote the Trump candidacy. An example of the targeting was the adding of Blue Lives Matter material to social media platforms by Russian operatives after the Black Lives Matter movement moved to the center of public attention in America and sparked a pro-police reaction.

Jamieson noted there was reason to believe Donald Trump would under-perform among two normally dependable conservative Republican voting blocs—churchgoing Christians and military service members and their families. It was thought pious Christians were put off by Trump's lifestyle as a Manhattan socialite, known for his three marriages and many affairs but not for any religious beliefs, who had boasted of groping women. Military personnel might lack enthusiasm for a candidate who avoided service in Vietnam but who described himself as a "brave soldier" in having to face his "personal Vietnam" of the threat of sexually transmitted diseases, and who mocked Gold Star parents and former prisoner of war John McCain. To overcome Trump's possible poor reputation among evangelicals and veterans, Russian trolls created memes that exploited typical conservative social attitudes about people of color, Muslims, and immigrants. One such meme juxtaposed photographs of a homeless veteran and an undocumented immigrant, alluding to the belief that undocumented immigrants receive special treatment. CNN exit polls showed that Trump led Clinton among veterans by 26 percentage points and won a higher percentage of the evangelical vote than either of the two previous Republican presidential nominees, indicating that this tactic may have succeeded.

== Intrusions into state election systems ==
A 2019 report by the Senate Intelligence Committee found "an unprecedented level of activity against state election infrastructure" by Russian intelligence in 2016. The activity occurred in "all 50 states" and is thought by "many officials and experts" to have been "a trial run ... to probe American defenses and identify weaknesses in the vast back-end apparatus—voter-registration operations, state and local election databases, electronic poll books and other equipment" of state election systems. The report warned that the United States "remains vulnerable" in the 2020 election.

Of "particular concern" to the committee report was the Russians' hacking of three companies "that provide states with the back-end systems that have increasingly replaced the thick binders of paper used to verify voters' identities and registration status."

=== Intrusions into state voter-registration systems ===
During the summer and fall of 2016, Russian hackers intruded into voter databases and software systems in 39 different states, alarming Obama administration officials to the point that they took the unprecedented step of contacting Moscow directly via the Moscow–Washington hotline and warning that the attacks risked setting off a broader conflict.

As early as June 2016, the FBI sent a warning to states about "bad actors" probing state-elections systems to seek vulnerabilities. In September 2016, FBI director James Comey testified before the House Judiciary Committee that the FBI was investigating Russian hackers attempting to disrupt the 2016 election and that federal investigators had detected hacker-related activities in state voter-registration databases, which independent assessments determined were soft targets for hackers. Comey stated there were multiple attempts to hack voter database registrations. Director of National Intelligence James Clapper attributed Russian hacking attempts to Vladimir Putin.

Part of the 2017 NSA report as published by The Intercept.

In August 2016, the FBI issued a nationwide "flash alert" warning state election officials about hacking attempts. In September 2016, U.S. Department of Homeland Security officials and the National Association of Secretaries of State announced that hackers had penetrated, or sought to penetrate, the voter-registration systems in more than 20 states over the previous few months. Federal investigators attributed these attempts to Russian government-sponsored hackers, and specifically to Russian intelligence agencies. Four of the intrusions into voter registration databases were successful, including intrusions into the Illinois and Arizona databases. Although the hackers did not appear to change or manipulate data, Illinois officials said information on up to 200,000 registered voters was stolen. The FBI and DHS increased their election-security coordination efforts with state officials as a result. Homeland Security Secretary Jeh Johnson reported that 18 states had requested voting-system security assistance from DHS. The department also offered risk assessments to the states, but just four states expressed interest, as the election was rapidly approaching. The reports of the database intrusions prompted alarm from Senate minority leader Harry Reid, Democrat of Nevada, who wrote to the FBI saying foreign attempts to cast doubt on free and fair elections was a danger to democracy not seen since the Cold War.

A June 5, 2017, article in The Intercept described how "a top-secret National Security Agency report" (dated May 5, 2017) "details a months-long Russian hacking effort against the U.S. election infrastructure". The NSA did not draw conclusions but reported "the possibility that Russian hacking may have breached at least some elements of the voting system, with disconcertingly uncertain results". The NSA report revealed that the Russian military's GRU hackers used spearfishing attacks to successfully get employee login credentials and login information at VR Systems, an election software vendor. That information "can be used to penetrate 'corporate VPNs, email, or cloud services,' allowing access to internal corporate data". Two months later, a second attack used "trojanized" Microsoft Word documents that were supposedly from a VR systems employee. They targeted officials at local government organizations who were "involved in the management of voter registration systems". This type of attack gave the hackers the same unlimited access and capabilities as trusted users. The NSA was uncertain about the results of this attack. The report detailed other Russian attacks.

On September 22, 2017, federal authorities notified the election officials of 21 states that their election systems had been targeted. "In most cases, states said they were told the systems were not breached." Over a year after the initial warnings, this was the first official confirmation many state governments received that their states specifically had been targeted. Moreover, top elections officials of the states of Wisconsin and California have denied the federal claim. California secretary of state Alex Padilla said, "California voters can further rest assured that the California secretary of state elections infrastructure and websites were not hacked or breached by Russian cyber actors ... Our notification from DHS last Friday was not only a year late, it also turned out to be bad information."

In May 2018, the Senate Intelligence Committee released its interim report on election security. The committee concluded, on a bipartisan basis, that the response of the U.S. Department of Homeland Security to Russian government-sponsored efforts to undermine confidence in the U.S. voting process was "inadequate". The committee reported that the Russian government penetrated election systems in at least 18, and possibly up to 21, states, and that in a smaller subset of states, infiltrators "could have altered or deleted voter registration data", although they lacked the ability to manipulate individual votes or vote tallies. The committee wrote that the infiltrators' failure to exploit vulnerabilities in election systems could have been because they "decided against taking action" or because "they were merely gathering information and testing capabilities for a future attack". To prevent future infiltrations, the committee made a number of recommendations, including that "at a minimum, any machine purchased going forward should have a voter-verified paper trail and no WiFi capability".

== Links between Trump associates and Russian officials ==
During the 2016 presidential campaign and up to his inauguration, Donald J. Trump and at least 18 campaign officials and advisers had numerous contacts with Russian nationals, WikiLeaks, or intermediaries between the two. As of January 28, The New York Times had tallied more than 140 in-person meetings, phone calls, text messages, emails and private messages between the Trump campaign and Russians or WikiLeaks.

In spring of 2015, U.S. intelligence agencies started overhearing conversations in which Russian government officials discussed associates of Donald Trump. British and the Dutch intelligence have given information to United States intelligence about meetings in European cities between Russian officials, associates of Putin, and associates of then-president-elect Trump. American intelligence agencies also intercepted communications of Russian officials, some of them within the Kremlin, discussing contacts with Trump associates. Multiple Trump associates were reported to have had contacts with senior Russian intelligence officials during 2016, although in February 2017 U.S. officials said they did not have evidence that Trump's campaign had co-operated with the Russians to influence the election. As of March 2017, the FBI was investigating Russian involvement in the election, including alleged links between Trump's associates and the Russian government.

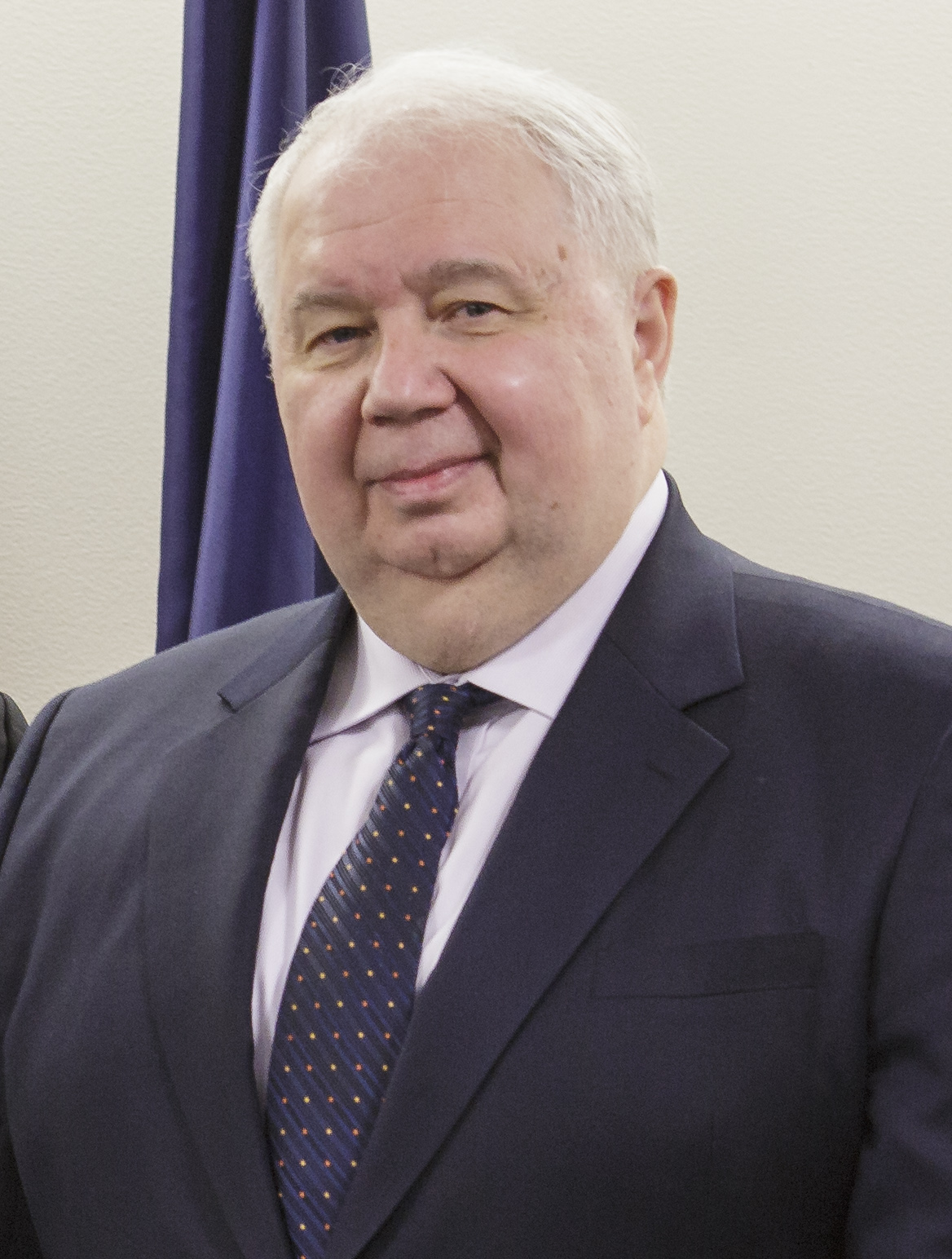
Russian ambassador Sergey Kislyak met with a number of U.S. officials.

In particular, Russian ambassador Sergey Kislyak has met several Trump campaign members and administration nominees; the people involved have dismissed those meetings as routine conversations in preparation for assuming the presidency. Trump's team has issued at least twenty denials concerning communications between his campaign and Russian officials; several of these denials turned out to be false. In the early months of 2017, Trump and other senior White House officials asked the Director of National Intelligence, the NSA director, the FBI director, and two chairs of congressional committees to publicly dispute the news reports about contacts between Trump associates and Russia.

=== Paul Manafort ===
Trump campaign chairman Paul Manafort had several contacts with senior Russian intelligence officials during 2016, which he denied. Intercepted communications during the campaign show that Russian officials believed they could use Manafort to influence Trump. The Mueller investigation and the Senate Intelligence Committee found that, as Trump's campaign manager in August 2016, Manafort shared Trump campaign internal polling data with Ukrainian political consultant Konstantin Kilimnik, whom the Mueller Report linked to Russian intelligence, while the Intelligence Committee characterized him as a "Russian intelligence officer". Manafort gave Kilimnik data for Michigan, Wisconsin and Pennsylvania, states the Russian Internet Research Agency specifically targeted for social media and ad campaigns. Trump won those three states by narrow margins and they were key to his election.

In 2017 Manafort was indicted in the U.S. District Court for the District of Columbia on various charges arising from his consulting work for the pro-Russian government of Viktor Yanukovych in Ukraine before Yanukovych's overthrow in 2014, as well as in the Eastern District of Virginia for eight charges of tax and bank fraud. He was convicted of the fraud charges in August 2019 and sentenced to 47 months in prison by Judge T.S. Ellis. Although all the 2017 charges arose from the Special Counsel investigation, none of them were for any alleged collusion to interfere with U.S. elections. On March 13, 2019, Judge Amy Berman Jackson sentenced Manafort to an additional 43 months in prison. That day, New York state prosecutors also charged Manafort with sixteen state felonies. On December 18, 2019, the state charges against him were dismissed because of the doctrine of double jeopardy. On May 13, 2020, Manafort was released to home confinement due to the threat of COVID-19. On December 23, 2020, U.S. president Donald Trump pardoned Manafort.

=== Michael Flynn ===
In December 2015, retired Army general Michael Flynn was photographed at a dinner seated next to Vladimir Putin. He was in Moscow to give a paid speech which he failed to disclose as is required of former high-ranking military officers. Also seated at the head table are Green Party presidential candidate Jill Stein and members of Putin's inner circle, including Sergei Ivanov, Dmitry Peskov, Vekselberg, and Alexey Gromov.

In February 2016, Flynn was named as an advisor to Trump's presidential campaign. Later that year, in phone calls intercepted by U.S. intelligence, Russian officials were overheard claiming they had formed a strong relationship with Trump advisor Flynn and believed they would be able to use him to influence Trump and his team.

In December 2016 Flynn, then Trump's designated choice to be National Security Advisor, and Jared Kushner met with Russian ambassador to the United States Sergey Kislyak and requested him to set up a direct, encrypted line of communication so they could communicate directly with the Kremlin without the knowledge of American intelligence agencies. Three anonymous sources claimed that no such channel was actually set up.

On December 29, 2016, the day President Obama announced sanctions against Russia, Flynn discussed the sanctions with Kislyak, urging that Russia not retaliate. Flynn initially denied speaking to Kislyak, then acknowledged the conversation but denied discussing the sanctions. When it was revealed in February 2017 that U.S. intelligence agencies had evidence, through monitoring of the ambassador's communications, that he actually had discussed the sanctions, Flynn said he couldn't remember if he did or not.

Upon Trump's inauguration on January 20, 2017, he appointed Flynn his national security advisor. On January 24, Flynn was interviewed by the FBI. Two days later, acting Attorney General Sally Yates informed the White House that Flynn was "compromised" by the Russians and possibly open to blackmail. Flynn was forced to resign as national security advisor on February 13, 2017.

On December 1, 2017, Flynn pleaded guilty to a single felony count of making "false, fictitious and fraudulent statements" to the FBI about his conversations with Kislyak. His plea was part of a plea bargain with special counsel Robert Mueller, under which Flynn also agreed to cooperate with Mueller's investigation which led to his sentencing being postponed several times.

In June 2019, Flynn fired his initial counsel from the firm Covington and Burling and hired Sidney Powell. Powell moved to compel production of additional Brady material and newly discovered evidence in October 2019, which was denied by Sullivan in December 2019. Flynn then moved to withdraw his guilty plea in January 2020, claiming that the government had acted in bad faith and breached the plea agreement.

In May 2020, the United States Department of Justice (DOJ) filed a motion to dismiss the charge against Flynn with prejudice, asserting that it no longer believed it could prove beyond a reasonable doubt that Flynn had made false statements to the FBI or that the statements, even if false, were materially false in regards to the FBI's investigation. Sullivan then appointed an amicus, John Gleeson, to prepare an argument against dismissal. Sullivan also allowed amici to file briefs regarding the dismissal motion.

Powell filed an emergency petition for a writ of mandamus in the Circuit Court of Appeals for the District of Columbia, asking (1) that Judge Sullivan be ordered to grant the government's motion to dismiss, (2) for Sullivan's amicus appointment of Gleeson to be vacated, and (3) for the case be assigned to another judge for any additional proceedings. The appellate court panel assigned to the case ordered Sullivan to respond, and briefs were also filed by the DOJ and amici. In June 2020, the appeals court panel ruled 2–1 in favor of Flynn on the first two requests, and the panel unanimously rejected the third request. Judge Sullivan petitioned the Court of Appeals for an en banc rehearing, a request opposed by Flynn and the DOJ. The appellate court granted Sullivan's petition in an 8-2 decision and vacated the panel's ruling. The case was ultimately dismissed as moot on December 8, 2020, after President Trump pardoned Flynn on November 25, 2020.

=== George Papadopoulos ===
In March 2016 Donald Trump named George Papadopoulos, an oil, gas, and policy consultant, as an unpaid foreign policy advisor to his campaign. Shortly thereafter Papadopoulos was approached by Joseph Mifsud, a London-based professor with connections to high-ranking Russian officials. Mifsud told him the Russians had "dirt" on Hillary Clinton in the form of "thousands of emails" "apparently stolen in an effort to try to damage her campaign". The two met several times in March 2016. In May 2016 at a London wine bar, Papadopoulos told the top Australian diplomat to the United Kingdom, Alexander Downer, that Russia "had a dirt file on rival candidate Hillary Clinton in the form of hacked Democratic Party emails". After the DNC emails were published by WikiLeaks in July, the Australian government told the FBI about Papadopoulos' revelation, leading the FBI to launch a counterintelligence investigation into the Trump campaign, known by its code name: Crossfire Hurricane, which has been criticized by Trump as a "witch hunt".

Papadopoulos' main activity during the campaign was attempting, unsuccessfully, to set up meetings between Russian officials (including Vladimir Putin) and Trump campaign officials (including Trump himself). In pursuit of this goal he communicated with multiple Trump campaign officials including Sam Clovis, Paul Manafort, Rick Gates, and Corey Lewandowski.

On January 27, 2017, Papadopoulos was interviewed by FBI agents. On July 27, he was arrested at Washington-Dulles International Airport, and he has since been cooperating with Special Counsel Robert Mueller in his investigation. On October 5, 2017, he pleaded guilty to one felony count of making false statements to FBI agents relating to contacts he had with agents of the Russian government while working for the Trump campaign. Papadopoulos's arrest and guilty plea became public on October 30, 2017, when court documents showing the guilty plea were unsealed. Papadopoulos was sentenced to 14 days in prison, 12 months supervised release, 200 hours of community service and was fined $9,500, on September 7, 2018. He was later pardoned by Trump in December 2020.

=== Veselnitskaya meeting ===
In June 2016, Donald Trump Jr., Paul Manafort and Jared Kushner met with Russian attorney Natalia Veselnitskaya, who was accompanied by some others, including Russian-American lobbyist Rinat Akhmetshin, after Trump Jr. was informed that Veselnitskaya could supply the Trump campaign with incriminating information about Hillary Clinton such as her dealings with the Russians. The meeting was arranged following an email from British music publicist Rob Goldstone who was the manager of Emin Agalarov, son of Russian tycoon Aras Agalarov. In the email, Goldstone said the information had come from the Russian government and "was part of a Russian government effort to help Donald Trump's presidential campaign". Trump Jr. replied with an e-mail saying "If it's what you say I love it especially later in the summer" and arranged the meeting. Trump Jr. went to the meeting expecting to receive information harmful to the Clinton campaign, but he said none was forthcoming, and instead the conversation then turned to the Magnitsky Act and the adoption of Russian children.

The meeting was disclosed by The New York Times on July 8, 2017. On the same day, Donald Trump Jr. released a statement saying it had been a short introductory meeting focused on adoption of Russian children by Americans and "not a campaign issue". Later that month The Washington Post revealed that Trump Jr.'s statement had been dictated by President Donald Trump, who had overruled his staff's recommendation that the statement be transparent about the actual motivation for the meeting: the Russian government's wish to help Trump's campaign.

=== Other Trump associates ===
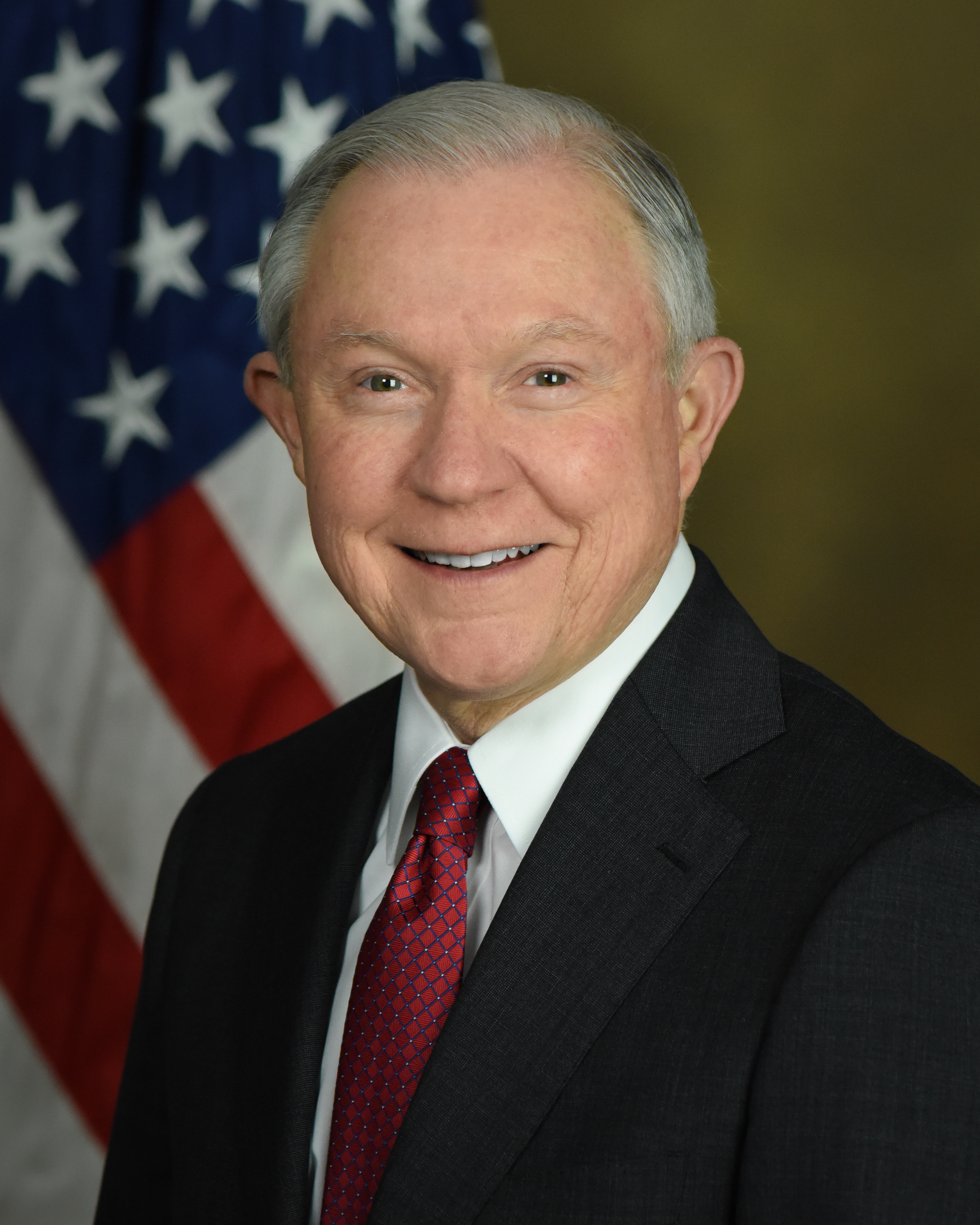
Former Attorney General Jeff Sessions talked with the Russian ambassador during the Trump campaign and recused himself from the investigation.

Former attorney general Jeff Sessions, an early and prominent supporter of Trump's campaign, spoke twice with Russian ambassador Kislyak before the election—once in July 2016 at the Republican convention and once in September 2016 in Sessions' Senate office. In his confirmation hearings, Sessions testified that he "did not have communications with the Russians". On March 2, 2017, after this denial was revealed to have been false, Sessions recused himself from matters relating to Russia's election interference and deferred to Deputy Attorney General Rod Rosenstein.

Roger Stone, a former adviser to Donald Trump and business partner of Paul Manafort, said he had been in contact with Guccifer 2.0, a hacker persona believed to be a front for Russian intelligence operations, who had publicly claimed responsibility for at least one hack of the DNC. During the campaign, Stone had stated repeatedly and publicly that he had "actually communicated with Julian Assange"; he later denied having done so. In August 2016, Stone had cryptically tweeted "Trust me, it will soon [sic] the Podesta's time in the barrel" shortly after claiming to have been in contact with WikiLeaks and before WikiLeaks' release of the Podesta emails. Stone has denied having any advance knowledge of the Podesta e-mail hack or any connection to Russian intelligence, stating that his earlier tweet was actually referring to reports of the Podesta Group's own ties to Russia. Stone ultimately named Randy Credico, who had interviewed both Assange and Stone for a radio show, as his intermediary with Assange.

In June 2018 Stone disclosed that he had met with a Russian individual during the campaign, who wanted Trump to pay two million dollars for "dirt on Hillary Clinton". This disclosure contradicted Stone's earlier claims that he had not met with any Russians during the campaign. The meeting Stone attended was set up by Donald Trump's campaign aide, Michael Caputo and is a subject of Robert Mueller's investigation.

Oil industry consultant Carter Page had his communications monitored by the FBI under a FISA warrant beginning in 2014, and again beginning in October 2016, after he was suspected of acting as an agent for Russia. Page told The Washington Post he considered that to be "unjustified, politically motivated government surveillance". Page spoke with Kislyak during the 2016 Republican National Convention, acting as a foreign policy adviser to Donald Trump. In 2013 he had met with Viktor Podobnyy, then a junior attaché at the Russian Permanent Mission to the United Nations, at an energy conference, and provided him with documents on the U.S. energy industry. Podobnyy was later charged with spying, but was protected from prosecution by diplomatic immunity. The FBI interviewed Page in 2013 as part of an investigation into Podonyy's spy ring, but never accused Page of wrongdoing.

The Mueller Report also found that Abu Dhabi's crown prince Mohammed bin Zayed Al Nahyan (MbZ) approached Richard Gerson, a financier and Jared Kushner's friend, to arrange his meetings with Trump. A Russian businessman Kirill Dmitriev, who was close to Vladimir Putin and Blackwater founder Erik Prince, discussed a "reconciliation plan" with Gerson for the U.S. and Russia, which was later shared with Kushner. MbZ also advised Trump on the dangers of Iran and about Palestinian peace talks. On January 11, 2017, UAE officials organized a meeting in the Seychelles between Prince and Dmitriev. They discussed a back channel between Trump and Putin along with Middle East policy, notably about Syria and Iran. U.S. officials said the FBI was investigating the meeting.

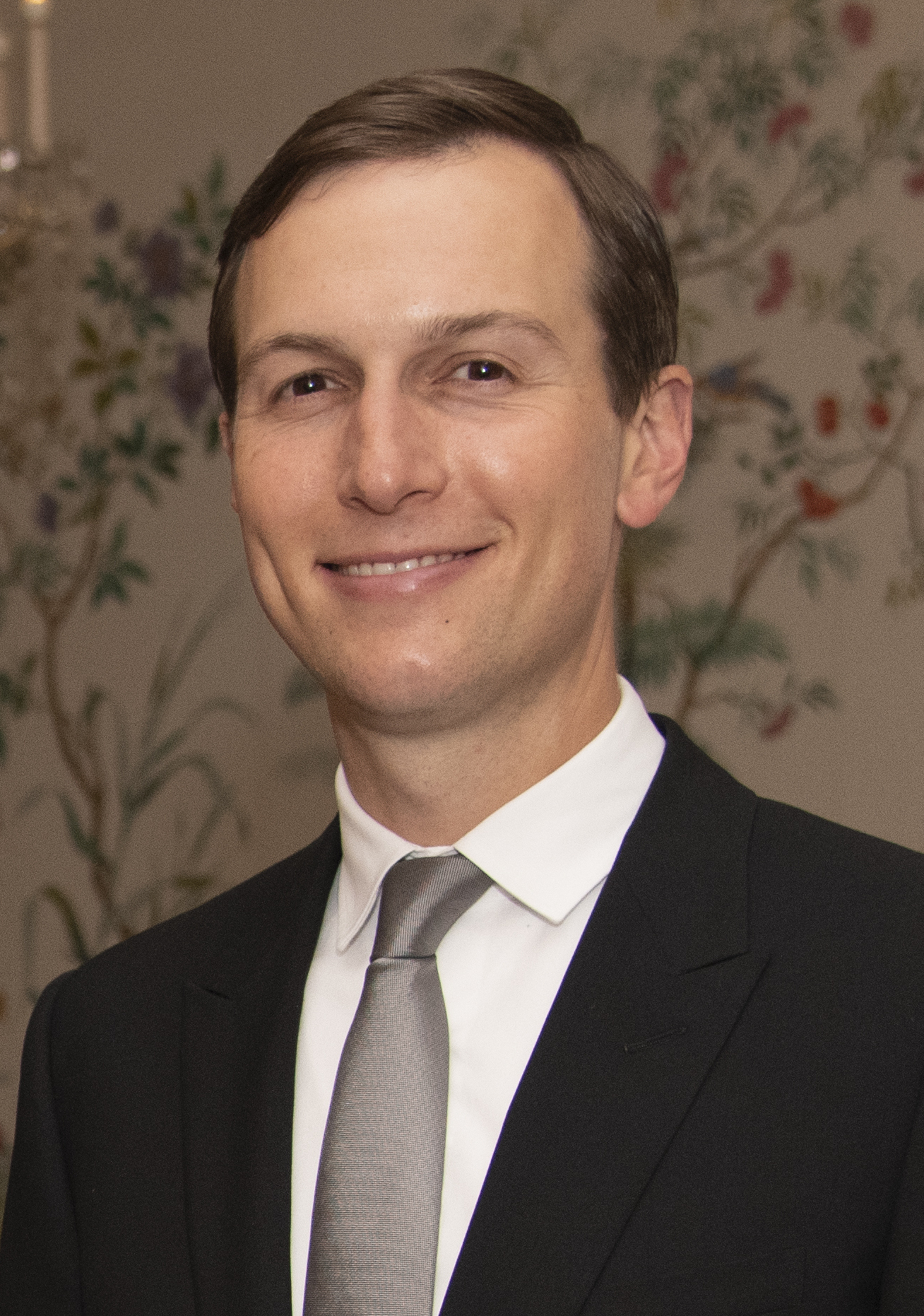
Jared Kushner, President Trump's son-in-law and senior advisor, failed to disclose meetings with Russian officials.

Donald Trump's son-in-law and senior advisor, Jared Kushner, on his application for top secret security clearance, failed to disclose numerous meetings with foreign officials, including Ambassador Kislyak and Sergei Gorkov, the head of the Russian state-owned bank Vnesheconombank. Kushner's lawyers called the omissions "an error". Vnesheconombank has said the meeting was business-related, in connection with Kushner's management of Kushner Companies. However, the Trump administration provided a different explanation, saying it was a diplomatic meeting.

On May 30, 2017, the House and Senate congressional panels both asked President Trump's personal lawyer Michael Cohen to "provide information and testimony" about any communications Cohen had with people connected to the Kremlin. Cohen had attempted to contact Kremlin spokesman Dmitry Peskov during the 2016 campaign, asking for help in advancing plans for a Trump Tower in Moscow.

In May 2017 longtime Republican operative Peter W. Smith confirmed to The Wall Street Journal that during the 2016 campaign he had been actively involved in trying to obtain emails he believed had been hacked from Hillary Clinton's computer server. In that quest he contacted several known hacker groups, including some Russian groups. He claimed he was working on behalf of Trump campaign advisor (later national security advisor) Michael Flynn and Flynn's son. At around the same time, there were intelligence reports that Russian hackers were trying to obtain Clinton's emails to pass to Flynn through an unnamed intermediary.

Five of the hacker groups Smith contacted, including at least two Russian groups, claimed to have Clinton's emails. He was shown some information but was not convinced it was genuine, and suggested the hackers give it to WikiLeaks instead. A document describing Smith's plans claimed that Flynn, Kellyanne Conway, Steve Bannon, and other campaign advisors were coordinating with him "to the extent permitted as an independent expenditure". The White House, a campaign official, Conway, and Bannon all denied any connection with Smith's effort. British blogger Matt Tait said Smith had contacted him—curiously, around the same time Trump called for the Russians to get Hillary Clinton's missing emails—to ask him to help authenticate any materials that might be forthcoming. Ten days after his interview with The Wall Street Journal, Smith committed suicide in a Minnesota hotel room, citing declining health.

== Discovery of campaign by Western intelligence ==
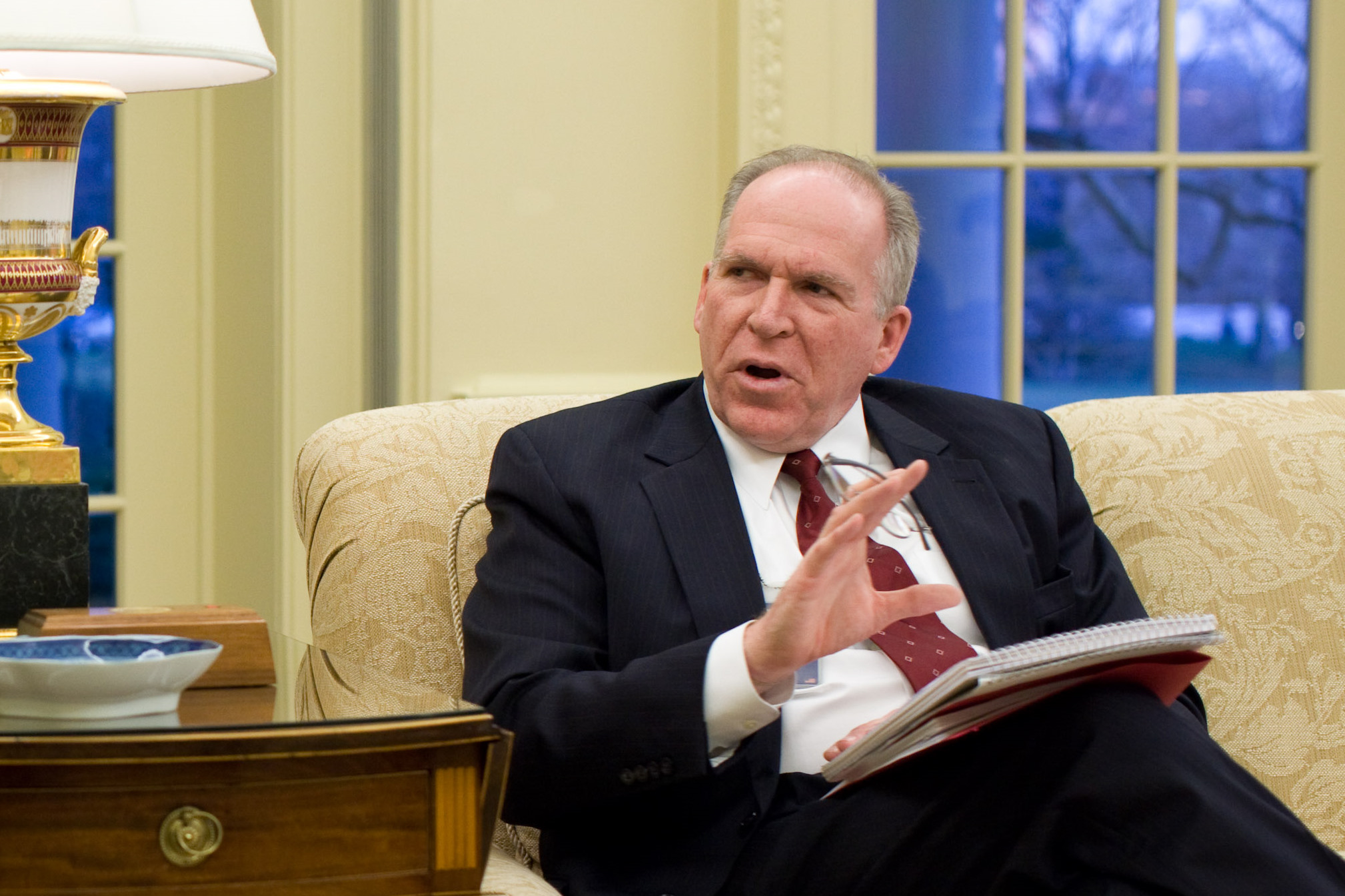
John O. Brennan, Assistant to the President for Counterterrorism and Homeland Security, in the Oval Office, January 4, 2010

U.S. intelligence agencies were slow to recognize the existence of Russian interference. This was in part because they could not surveil U.S. citizens without a warrant. Instead, it was U.S. allies conducting routine surveillance of known and suspected Russian agents who discovered the pattern of "suspicious 'interactions' between figures connected to Trump and [the agents]" in 2015 and early 2016. These countries included the UK, Germany, Estonia, Poland, and Australia, all of which relayed their discoveries to the U.S. (Note: It has been alleged, but not confirmed, that the Netherlands and France were also among the countries that relayed their concerns to the U.S.)

Given the importance and sensitivity of the information, GCHQ director Robert Hannigan contacted CIA director John O. Brennan about it directly. Brenan was highly alarmed by this information. The CIA started their own investigation into the matter. By summer 2016, they had obtained intelligence from "sources inside the Russian government" that stated that Putin gave direct orders to disparage Clinton and help Trump. Consensus also grew in the agency that Russia had been responsible for the hacking of the DNC. Brennan would later testify before Congress that this was when he became "convinced... that the Russians were trying to interfere in the election. And they were very aggressive.”

On August 4, Brennan reached out to his counterpart at Russia's FSB intelligence agency, Alexander Bortnikov, and warned him against further electoral interference. Later that month, Brennan gave a classified briefing to the bipartisan U.S. Congress "Gang of Eight" relaying what the CIA had discovered. He continued to regularly brief them on new developments on the matter throughout the fall.

On December 9, the CIA told U.S. legislators that the U.S. intelligence community had reached the consensus that Russia conducted operations to assist Donald Trump's presidential campaign. They stated that "individuals with connections to the Russian government", previously known to the intelligence community, had given WikiLeaks hacked emails from the DNC and John Podesta. The agencies further stated that Russia had hacked the RNC as well, but did not leak information obtained from there. These assessments were based on evidence obtained before the election.

=== Steele dossier ===
In June 2016, Christopher Steele, a former MI6 agent, was hired by Fusion GPS to produce opposition research on Donald Trump. In October 2015, before Steele was hired, Trump's Republican political opponents had hired Fusion GPS to do opposition research on Trump. When they stopped their funding, Fusion GPS inquired whether the Democratic party and Hillary Clinton campaign wanted to pay for continuation of research into Trump. The party and campaign agreed and hired Fusion in April 2016. Fusion GPS hired Steele to continue the research, but with more focus on Trump's Russian connections. In the beginning, Steele did not know the identities of Fusion GPS's ultimate clients, at first Republicans and then Democrats. His reports, based on information provided by his witting and unwitting Russian sources and sources close to the Trump campaign, included alleged kompromat that may make Trump vulnerable to blackmail from Russia.

In October 2016, a 33-page compilation was shared with Mother Jones magazine, which described some of its contents, but other mainstream media would not report on it because they could not confirm the material's credibility. In December 2016, two more pages were added alleging efforts by Trump's lawyer to pay those who had hacked the DNC and arranging to cover up any evidence of their deeds. On January 5, 2017, U.S. intelligence agencies briefed President Obama and President-elect Trump on the existence of these documents. Eventually, the dossier was published in full by BuzzFeed News on January 10.

In October 2016, the FBI used the dossier as part of its justification to obtain a FISA warrant to resume monitoring of former Trump foreign policy advisor Carter Page. However, officials would not say exactly what or how much of the dossier was actually corroborated.

According to James Clapper, John Brennan, and Robert S. Litt, Steele's dossier "played no role" in the January 6, 2017, intelligence community assessment of the Russian actions in the 2016 election, testimony which was reaffirmed by an April 2020 bipartisan Senate Intelligence Committee report that found the dossier was not used to "support any of its analytic judgments".

There were conflicting opinions between the FBI and CIA on whether to include any of the dossier's allegations in the body of the ICA report, with the FBI pushing for inclusion, and the CIA countering that the dossier "was not completely vetted and did not merit inclusion in the body of the report". After much discussion, the CIA prevailed, and the final ICA report only included a short summary of Steele's reporting in the "highly classified" Annex A. There were other reasons to not include it, and CNN wrote that:

The intelligence agencies, particularly the CIA, and the FBI took Steele’s research seriously enough that they kept it out of a publicly-released January report on Russian meddling in the election in order to not divulge which parts of the dossier they had corroborated and how. ... And if that report included the dossier allegations, the intelligence community would have to say which parts it had corroborated and how. That would compromise sources and methods, including information shared by foreign intelligence services, intelligence officials believed.

=== Initial FBI inquiries ===
The FBI began investigating the Russian government's attempt to influence the 2016 presidential election—including whether campaign associates of Donald Trump's were involved in Russia's efforts—on July 31, 2016.

Following the July 22 publication of a large number of emails by WikiLeaks, the FBI announced that it would investigate the theft of DNC emails.

An earlier event investigated by the FBI was a May 2016 meeting between the Donald Trump campaign foreign policy advisor, George Papadopoulos, and Alexander Downer in a London wine bar, where Papadopoulos disclosed his inside knowledge of a large trove of Hillary Clinton emails that could potentially damage her campaign.

Papadopoulos had gained this knowledge on March 14, 2016, when he held a meeting with Joseph Mifsud, who told Papadopoulos the Russians had "dirt" on Clinton in the form of thousands of stolen emails. These were from the hackings of the DNC.

Although the public were informed on May 18, 2016, that both presidential campaigns were targeted by hackers, they were not told if the hacks were successful or the identity of the hackers. It was first on June 14, 2016, that the hacking of the DNC computers first became public knowledge.

Papadopoulos later bragged "that the Trump campaign was aware the Russian government had dirt on Hillary Clinton". In February 2019, Michael Cohen implicated Trump before the U.S. Congress, writing that Trump had knowledge that Roger Stone was communicating with WikiLeaks about releasing emails stolen from the DNC in 2016.

John Podesta later testified before the House Permanent Select Committee on Intelligence that in April 2016, the DNC did not know their computers had been hacked, leading Adam Schiff to state: "So if the [Clinton] campaign wasn't aware in April that the hacking had even occurred, the first campaign to be notified the Russians were in possession of stolen emails would have been the Trump campaign through Mr. Papadopoulos."

In June 2016, the FBI notified the Illinois Republican Party that some of its email accounts may have been hacked. In December 2016, an FBI official stated that Russian attempts to access the RNC server were unsuccessful. In an interview with George Stephanopoulos of ABC News, RNC chair Reince Priebus stated they communicated with the FBI when they learned about the DNC hacks, and a review determined their servers were secure. On January 10, 2017, FBI director James Comey told the Senate Intelligence Committee that Russia succeeded in "collecting some information from Republican-affiliated targets but did not leak it to the public".

On October 31, 2016, before the election, The New York Times said the FBI had been examining possible connections between the Trump campaign and Russia, but did not find any clear links at that time. At the time, FBI officials thought Russia was motivated to undermine confidence in the U.S. political process rather than specifically support Trump. During a House Intelligence Committee hearing in early December, the CIA said it was certain of Russia's intent to help Trump. On December 16, 2016, CIA director John O. Brennan sent a message to his staff saying he had spoken with FBI director James Comey and Director of National Intelligence James Clapper, and that all agreed with the CIA's conclusion that Russia interfered in the presidential election with the motive of supporting Donald Trump's candidacy.

On December 29, 2016, the FBI and the Department of Homeland Security (DHS) released an unclassified report that gave new technical details regarding methods used by Russian intelligence services for affecting the U.S. election, government, political organizations and private sector.

The report included malware samples and other technical details as evidence that the Russian government had hacked the Democratic National Committee. Alongside the report, DHS published Internet Protocol addresses, malware, and files used by Russian hackers. An article in the Süddeutsche Zeitung discussed the difficulty of proof in matters of cybersecurity. One analyst told the Süddeutsche Zeitung that U.S. intelligence services could be keeping some information secret to protect their sources and analysis methods. Clapper later said the classified version contained "a lot of the substantiation that could not be put in the [public] report".

On October 7, 2016, Secretary Johnson and Director Clapper issued a joint statement that the intelligence community is confident the Russian Government directed the recent compromises of e-mails from U.S. persons and institutions, including from U.S. political organizations, and that the disclosures of hacked e-mails on sites like DCLeaks.com and WikiLeaks are consistent with the Russian-directed efforts. The statement also noted that the Russians have used similar tactics and techniques across Europe and Eurasia to influence public opinion there. On December 29, 2016, DHS and FBI released a Joint Analysis Report (JAR) which further expands on that statement by providing details of the tools and infrastructure used by Russian intelligence services to compromise and exploit networks and infrastructure associated with the recent U.S. election, as well as a range of U.S. government, political and private sector entities.

In later testimony to the Senate Intelligence Committee on June 8, Comey said he had "no doubt" Russia interfered in the 2016 election and that the interference was a hostile act.

== Initial U.S. government response ==
=== Publication of IC findings ===
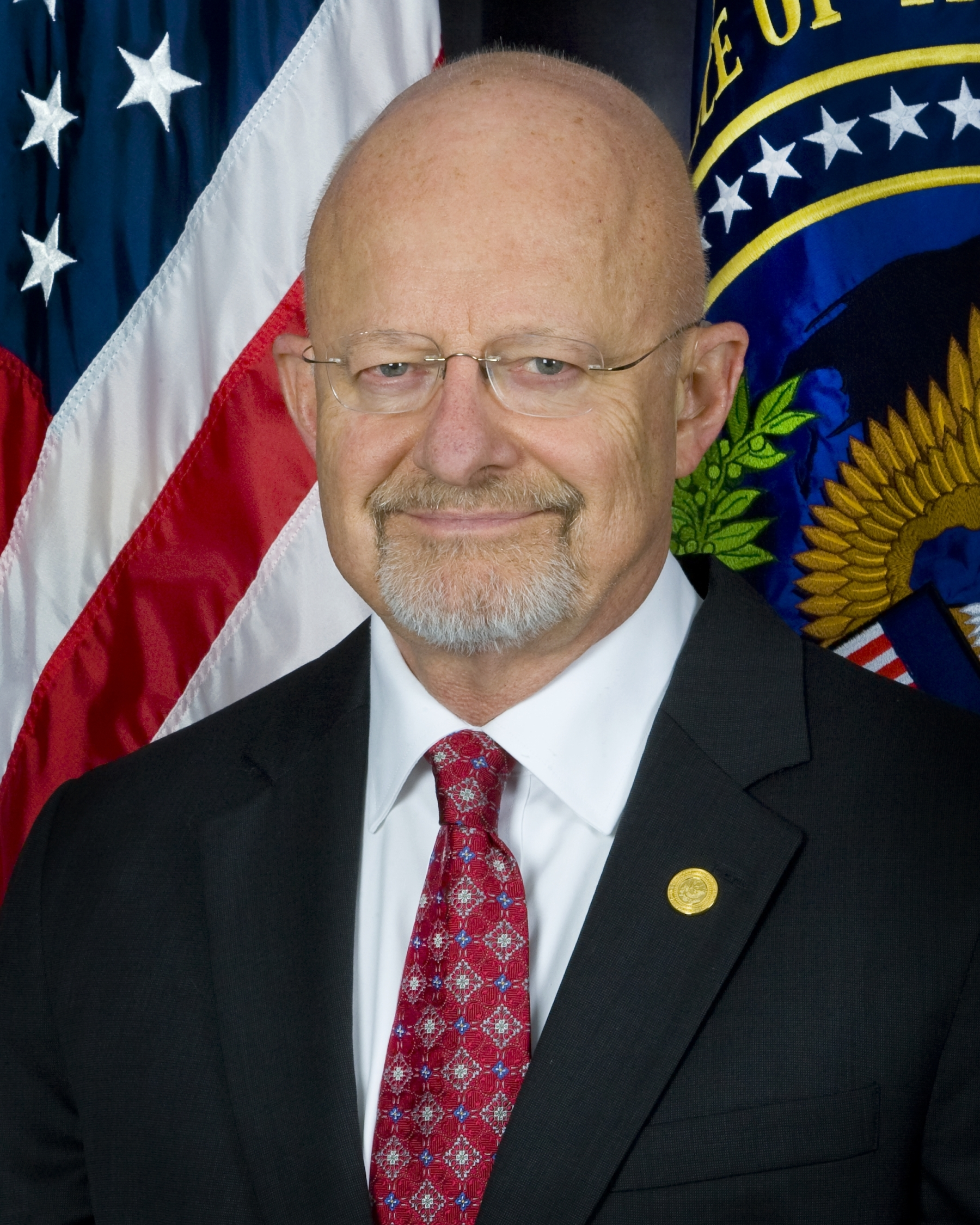
James R. Clapper

As early as summer 2016, members of the US Intelligence Community (IC) began to make public their concerns about Russian interference in the presidential election. At the Aspen security conference in late July, Director of National Intelligence James Clapper said Vladimir Putin had likey acted in retaliation against perceived U.S. intervention in Russian affairs, such as the 2011–2013 Russian protests and the 2014 Revolution of Dignity in neighboring Ukraine.

On October 7, 2016, the U.S. government formally accused Russia of hacking the DNC's computer networks as part of a broader campaign of electoral interference. In a joint statement, the Department of Homeland Security and the Office of the Director of National Intelligence (ODNI) expressed confidence that Russia had stolen emails from politicians and U.S. groups, and publicized them with the intent of swaying the election's outcome. The statement alleged that, "The recent disclosures of alleged hacked e-mails on sites like DCLeaks.com and WikiLeaks and by the Guccifer 2.0 online persona are consistent with the methods and motivations of Russian-directed efforts."

On December 2, intelligence sources told CNN they had gained confidence that Russia's efforts were aimed at helping Trump win the election.

=== Obama administration response ===
President Barack Obama ordered the United States Intelligence Community to investigate election hacking attempts since 2008.

In September 2016, at the G20 Summit in Hangzhou, China, Obama warned Putin that if Russia did not stop tampering with America's election process, it would face "serious consequences" . According to Obama, Russia stopped trying to hack American electoral infrastructure afterwards. However, hacked emails from the DNC continued to be published. So on October 31, Obama contacted Putin via the Moscow–Washington hotline (Note: Commonly known as the "red phone", the hotline was created to de-escalate incidents that could potentially lead to nuclear war between the two countries.) and again warned him to stop. To emphasize the gravity of the situation, Obama reminded Putin that "international law, including the law for armed conflict, applies to actions in cyberspace."

However, Obama refused to publicly retaliate against Russia before the election out of fear of appearing partisan. In public statements, Administration officials stressed that cyber warfare against the U.S. should be a bipartisan issue. As such, Obama avoided publically repeating the IC consensus that Russia had interfered to help Trump win the election, though he did state in interviews that Russian efforts caused more harm to Clinton than to Trump during the campaign. When Trump publicly rejected the IC consensus, Obama administration officials rebuked him for polarizing the issue.

After the election concluded, these concerns lessened. As such, on December 15, 2016, Obama announced that a US response to Russia's interference would occur soon. It would involve both overt and covert methods, and have the goal of sending a message to the world that interfering in American elections would result in severe consequences.

Two weeks later, the Obama Administration announced a series of punitive measures against Russia. Sanctions were imposed on four top GRU officials and five Russian entities by executive order, and 35 Russian diplomats suspected of spying were declared to be persona non grata. (Note: In 2001, the U.S. government expelled 51 Russian diplomats from the country in retaliation for Moscow's alleged recruitment of FBI special agent Robert Hanssen.) The next day, the Administration ordered that two compounds belonging to the Russian embassy must be shut down. Administration officials also announced that further covert actions had been undertaken against Russia.

Putin refrained from public retaliation. Instead, he invited all the children of U.S. diplomats accredited in Russia to New Year's and Christmas celebrations at the Kremlin. He explained that he did so because he expected positive Russian-American relations to be restored by the incoming Trump administration.

In the last days of the Obama administration, officials pushed as much raw intelligence as possible and attempted to keep reports at relatively low classification levels to widen their visibility across the federal government. The information was filed in many locations within federal agencies as a precaution against future concealment or destruction of evidence by the incoming Trump administration.

=== Response by Congress ===
The first public U.S. government assertion of Russian efforts to influence the 2016 election came in a joint statement on September 22, 2016, by Senator Dianne Feinstein and Representative Adam Schiff, the top Democrats on the Senate and House Intelligence Committees, respectively.

Mitch McConnell, who was Senate majority leader and a member of the Gang of Eight, discouraged members and the White House from speaking publicly about the CIA's assessment about Russian interference, rejected calls for the creation of a select panel to investigate Russian meddling. These and future actions led to his critics nicknaming him "Moscow Mitch".

==== Congressional sanctions ====
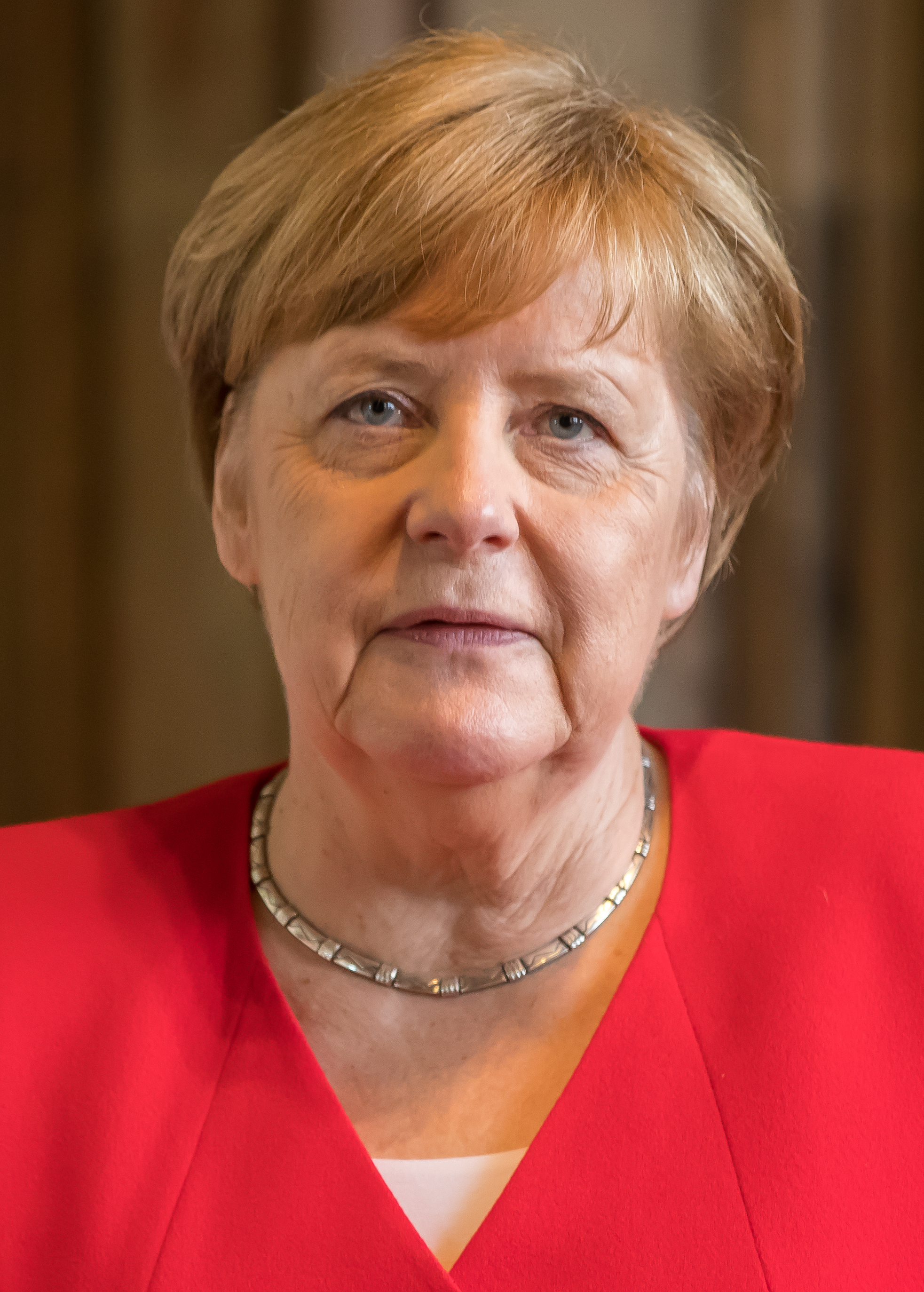
German Chancellor Angela Merkel criticized the CAATSA sanctions against Russia, targeting EU–Russia energy projects.

In January 2017, a bipartisan group of senators introduced the Countering America's Adversaries Through Sancitons Act (CAATSA). CAATSA would, among other things, expand the sanctions that had been imposed on Russia for its election interference, and convert those imposed by executive orders into law. It also forbade the president from lifting earlier sanctions without first consulting Congress, giving them time to reverse such a move.

The proposed sanctions met with fierce criticism from the European Union, Germany and France, which feared they would cripple gas pipeline projects they had underway with Russia. Nevertheless, in July 2017, CAATSA passed both houses near unanimously. (Note: The final vote was 419-3 in favor in the House, and 98-2 in favor in the Senate.) As the bill had passed Congress with veto-proof majorities, Trump was forced to sign it into law; however, he issued two signing statements sharply criticizing the act.

Three days later, Russia retaliated. Its foreign ministry demanded that the U.S. reduce its diplomatic staff in the country to 455 people; it also suspending the Americans' use of two facilities in the Moscow area. These actions were taken on Putin's personal orders. The Russian leader also publicly criticized CAATSA, saying it was "impossible to endlessly tolerate this kind of insolence towards our country".

On January 29, 2018, the Trump administration notified Congress that it would not impose the additional sanctions on Russia mandated by CAATSA. They claimed that the mere threat of the sanctions was a sufficient deterrent, which made their full implementation unnecessary. However, after fierce criticism from both Congress and the public, the White House was forced to reverse course, implementing the first round of sanctions on March 15.

== Impact on election result ==
As of October 2018, the question of whether Donald Trump won the 2016 election because of the Russian interference had not been given much focus. The question has been declared impossible to answer or has been ignored in favor of other factors that led to Trump's victory. Joel Benenson, the Clinton campaign's pollster, has said that the answer to this question will probably never be known, while Richard Burr, the Republican chairman of the Senate Intelligence Committee, said "we cannot calculate the impact that foreign meddling and social media had on this election". Michael V. Hayden, a former director of the CIA and the NSA, has asserted that the Russian attacks were "the most successful covert influence operation in history", but that their impact is "not just unknown, it's unknowable". Statistician Nate Silver, writing in February 2018, described himself as "fairly agnostic" on the question, but noted that "thematically, the Russian interference tactics were consistent with the reasons Clinton lost".

Clinton supporters have been more likely to blame her defeat on factors like campaign mistakes or FBI Director James Comey's decision to reopen the criminal investigation into Clinton's emails than to blame it on Russian interference. They have also drawn attention to the issue of whether Trump colluded with Russia in connection with the campaign. In their book Shattered: Inside Hillary Clinton's Doomed Campaign, reporters Jonathan Allen and Amie Parnes reported that immediately after the election, Robby Mook and John Podesta decided to assert that Russian hacking was the real reason for the defeat.

Several high-level Republicans, including those who would have benefited from Russia's efforts, have asserted that Russian interference did not determine the election's outcome. President Trump has asserted that "the Russians had no impact on our votes whatsoever", and Vice President Pence has claimed that "it is the universal conclusion of our intelligence communities that none of those efforts had any impact on the outcome of the 2016 election." Secretary of State Mike Pompeo added that "the intelligence community's assessment is that the Russian meddling that took place did not affect the outcome of the election". In fact, the official intelligence assessment of January 2017 did not evaluate whether Russian activities had any impact on the election's outcome, and CIA spokesman Dean Boyd said Pompeo's remark was erroneous. House Speaker Paul Ryan claimed that it was "clear" that the Russian interference "didn't have a material effect on our elections".

On the other hand, a number of former intelligence and law enforcement officials, at least one political scientist and one former U.S. president argue that Russian interference was decisive. In support of this argument, they point to the sophistication of the Russian propaganda on social media, the hacking of Democratic Party emails and the timing of their public release, the small shift in voter support needed to achieve victory in the Electoral College, and the relatively high number of undecided voters (who may have been more readily influenced). James Clapper, the former director of National Intelligence, told Jane Mayer, "it stretches credulity to think the Russians didn't turn the election ... I think the Russians had more to do with making Clinton lose than Trump did". Ex-FBI agent Clint Watts has written that "without the Russian influence ... I believe Trump would not have even been within striking distance of Clinton on Election Day". Former president Jimmy Carter has publicly said he believes Trump would not have been elected without the Russian interference. Carter has said, "Trump didn't actually win the election in 2016. He lost the election, and he was put into office because the Russians interfered on his behalf". When questioned, Carter agreed that Trump was an "illegitimate president".

Three states where Trump won by very close margins—margins significantly less than the number of votes cast for third-party candidates in those states—gave him an Electoral College majority. Mayer writes that if only 12% of these third-party voters "were persuaded by Russian propaganda—based on hacked Clinton-campaign analytics—not to vote for Clinton", this would have been enough to win the election for Trump. Political scientist Kathleen Hall Jamieson, in a detailed forensic analysis concludes that Russian trolls and hackers persuaded enough Americans "to either vote a certain way or not vote at all" to affect the election results. Specifically, Jamieson argued that two factors that caused a drop in intention to vote for Clinton reported to pollsters can be traced to Russian work: The publicizing of excerpts of speeches by Clinton made to investment banks for high fees and disinformation on FBI head Comey's public denunciation of Clinton's actions as "extremely careless" (see above).

A Columbia study published in 2022 saw changes on election betting markets around Russian holidays, when trolls would be less active. An NYU study published in 2023 found Russian Twitter trolls, specifically, had no measurable impact.

== U.S. Investigations into Russian interference campaign ==
At least 17 distinct legal investigations were started to examine aspects of Russian interference in the 2016 United States elections.

=== January 2017 intelligence community assessment ===
On December 9, 2016, Obama ordered the U.S. Intelligence Community (IC) to investigate Russian interference in the election and report before he left office in January. The investigation, which was conducted by the CIA, FBI, NSA, and ODNI, covered cyberwarfare occurring between the 2008 and 2016 elections.

On January 6, 2017, after briefing the president, the president-elect, and members of the Senate and House, ODNI made a de-classified version of the report public. The report, which came to be known as the intelligence community assessment (ICA), asserted that Russia had carried out a massive cyber operation, personally ordered by Putin, with the goal of sabotaging the 2016 U.S. elections. The agencies concluded that Putin and the Russian government tried to help Trump win the election by attacking Hillary Clinton. The multipronged cyber campaign involved both hacking and the extensive use of social media trolls, as well as open propaganda on Russian-controlled news platforms. The ICA did not publicize all the evidence underlying its conclusions; in a later interview, Clapper explained this was done because much of it was classified. He also clarified that all sources were included in the classified version of the report that had been given to lawmakers of both parties. A large part of the ICA was dedicated to criticizing Russian TV channel RT America, which it described as a "messaging tool" for a "Kremlin-directed campaign to undermine faith in the U.S. Government and fuel political protest."

The ICA focused on cataloguing lessons learned for the IC, rather on answering the question of if the Trump campaign had colluded with Russia. In future interviews, James Clapper said the ICA did not cover the topic at all, and as such, did not contain evidence proving its existence. However, he made clear this also did not mean collusion had been disproven, either; in an interview on May 14, 2017, he said "there was no evidence of any collusion included in that report, that's not to say there wasn't evidence".

=== U.S. Senate ===
In December 2016, Members of the U.S. Senate Intelligence Committee traveled to Ukraine and Poland in 2016 and learned about Russian operations to influence their elections. That same month, Senator John McCain called for a Senate special select committee to investigate Russian meddling in the election, which he referred to as an "act of war".

On January 10, 2018, Senator Ben Cardin of the United States Senate Foreign Relations Committee released a report stating that the interference in the 2016 United States elections was a part of Putin's "asymmetric assault on democracy" worldwide. The report found elections in countries such as Britain, France and Germany, were also targeted by "Moscow-sponsored hacking, internet trolling and financing for extremist political groups".

==== Senate Intelligence Committee inquiry ====
In 2017, the Senate Intelligence Committee began work on a bipartisan inquiry into Russian interfernce in the 2016 election. During the inquiry, the committee subpoenad the Trump campaign for all Russia-related documents, emails, and telephone records. They also investigated the campaign of Green Party presidential candidate Jill Stein for potential "collusion with the Russians".

In May 2018, the committee released an interim report stating that Russia interfered in the 2016 election with the goal of helping Trump gain the presidency. The report states, "Our staff concluded that the [intelligence community's] conclusions were accurate and on point. The Russian effort was extensive, sophisticated, and ordered by President Putin himself for the purpose of helping Donald Trump and hurting Hillary Clinton."

On April 21, 2020, the committee released the first volume of the investigations' final report. The remaining four volumes would be published over the next few months, with the fifth and final volume published on August 17. The unanimous report found that the Russian government had engaged in an "extensive campaign" to sabotage the election in favor of Trump, which they said was unprecedented in its "manner and aggressiveness". They also stated that members of Trump's 2016 campaign staff had been eager to accept Russia's help. The committee concluded the evidence collected by US intelligence was "coherent and well-constructed", and "analysts were under no political pressure to reach specific conclusions." It said the Trump administration had used "novel claims" of executive privilege to obstruct the inquiry.

After the report's release, acting committee chair Marco Rubio, a Republican, issued a statement saying that the committee had "found absolutely no evidence that then-candidate Donald Trump or his campaign colluded with the Russian government to meddle in the 2016 election." The end of Volume 5 contained an extended response under the names of Rubio and other Republican committee members that included a similar statement. The Volume also contained a lengthy response under the names of Democratic Party committee members.

==== New Knowledge and Oxford investigations ====
In addition to conducting its own inquiry, the Senate Intelligence Committee commissioned two teams of outside researchers to look the subject. One investigation was led by cybersecurity company New Knowledge, with support from researchers at Columbia University and Canfield Research. The other investigation was conducted by the Computational Propaganda Project of Oxford University along with the social media analysis company Graphika.

Their reports, both published in 2018, highlighted "the energy and imagination" of the Russian effort to "sway American opinion and divide the country". Examples of efforts included spreading misinformation and conspiracy theories, attempting to depress Black Americans' voter turnout, and "encouraging extreme right-wing voters to be more confrontational. It also faulted U.S. social media companies for "allowing their platforms to be co-opted for foreign propaganda".

=== U.S. House of Representatives ===
After bipartisan calls to action in December 2016, the House Permanent Select Committee on Intelligence launched an investigation in January 2017 about Russian election meddling, including possible ties between Trump's campaign and Russia.

On February 24, 2017, Republican congressman Darrell Issa called for a special prosecutor to investigate whether Russia meddled with the U.S. election and was in contact with Trump's team during the presidential campaign, saying it would be improper for Trump's appointee, former attorney general Jeff Sessions, to lead the investigation. In March 2017, Democratic ranking committee member Adam Schiff said there was sufficient evidence to warrant further investigation, and claimed to have seen "more than circumstantial evidence" of collusion.

On April 6, 2017, Republican committee chairman Devin Nunes temporarily recused himself from the investigation after the House Ethics Committee announced that it would investigate accusations that he had disclosed classified information without authorization. He was replaced by Representative Mike Conaway. Nunes was cleared of wrongdoing on December 8, 2017.

In spite of the Democratic minority's objections, the Republican majority shut down the committee's probe on March 12, 2018. Democrats on the committee objected to the Republicans' refusal to press key witnesses for further testimony or documentation that might have further established complicity of the Trump campaign with Russia. Schiff issued a 21-page "status report" outlining plans to continue the investigation, including a list of additional witnesses to interview and documents to request.

The committee's Republican majority released its final report amid harsh criticism from Democratic members of the committee. The report acknowledged that Russians interfered in the 2016 elections through an active measures campaign using propaganda and fake news. However, it rejected the conclusion of intelligence agencies that Russia had favored Trump in the election, and stated that the committee had found "no evidence" of collusion between the Russian government and the Trump campaign. Conaway said they had uncovered "perhaps some bad judgment, inappropriate meetings". The Republicans did acknowledge that other, as yet unfinished, investigations "may find facts that were not readily accessible to the Committee or outside the scope of our investigation".

The Democratic minority disputed that finding, with Adam Schiff asserting there was "significant evidence" of collusion. Additionally, some Republican committee members distanced themselves from this assertion.

=== FBI investigation and dismissal of Director James Comey ===
On March 20, 2017, during public testimony to the House Intelligence Committee, Comey confirmed the existence of the investigation, including the question of whether there had been any coordination between the campaign and the Russians. He said the investigation began in July 2016. The decision to reveal the ongoing investigation was unusual, but Comey believed disclosing it would benefit to the public good.

On May 9, 2017, Trump dismissed Comey, attributing his action to recommendations from United States attorney general Jeff Sessions and Deputy Attorney General Rod Rosenstein. Trump had been talking to aides about firing Comey for at least a week before acting, and had asked Justice Department officials to come up with a rationale for dismissing him. After he learned that Trump was about to fire Comey, Rosenstein submitted to Trump a memo critical of Comey's conduct in the investigation about Hillary Clinton's emails. Trump later confirmed that he had intended to fire Comey regardless of any Justice Department recommendation. Trump himself also tied the firing to the Russia investigation in a televised interview, stating, "When I decided to [fire Comey], I said to myself, I said, 'You know, this Russia thing with Trump and Russia is a made up story, it's an excuse by the Democrats for having lost an election that they should have won.'"

The dismissal came as a surprise to Comey and most of Washington, and was described as immediately controversial and having "vast political ramifications" because of the Bureau's ongoing investigation into Russian activities in the 2016 election. It was compared to the Saturday Night Massacre, President Richard Nixon's termination of special prosecutor Archibald Cox, who had been investigating the Watergate scandal, and to the dismissal of Sally Yates in January 2017. Comey himself stated "It's my judgment that I was fired because of the Russia investigation. I was fired in some way to change, or the endeavor was to change, the way the Russia investigation was being conducted."

During a meeting with Russian foreign minister Sergey Lavrov and ambassador Sergey Kislyak on May 10, 2017, in the Oval Office, Trump told the Russian officials that firing the FBI director, James Comey, had relieved "great pressure" on him, according to a White House document. Trump stated, "I just fired the head of the F.B.I. He was crazy, a real nut job ... I faced great pressure because of Russia. That's taken off." In 2019, The Washington Post revealed that Trump also told Lavrov and Kislyak during this meeting that he wasn't concerned about Russia interfering in American elections.

In testimony to the Senate Intelligence Committee on June 8, Comey said he had "no doubt" Russia interfered in the 2016 election and that the interference was a hostile act. Concerning the motives of his dismissal, Comey said, "I take the president at his word that I was fired because of the Russia investigation. Something about the way I was conducting it, the president felt, created pressure on him he wanted to relieve." He also said that, while he was director, Trump was not under investigation.

=== Special counsel investigation ===
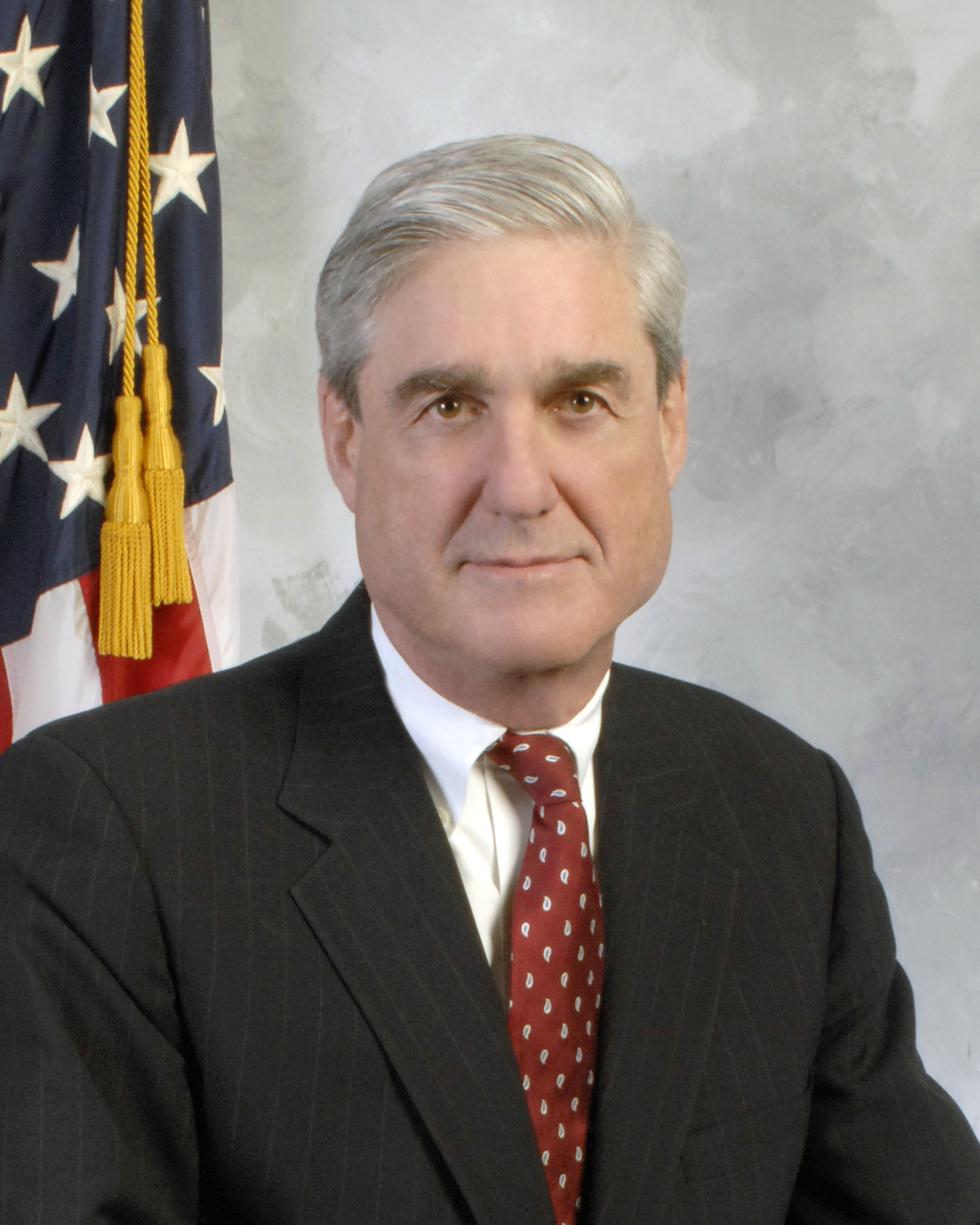
Special counsel Robert Mueller directed the FBI from 2001 to 2013.

On May 17, 2017, Deputy Attorney General Rod Rosenstein appointed former FBI director Robert Mueller as special counsel to direct FBI agents and Department of Justice prosecutors investigating election interference by Russia and related matters. As special counsel, Mueller had the power to issue subpoenas, hire staff members, request funding, and prosecute federal crimes in connection with his investigation.

In response, Trump engaged several attorneys to represent and advise him, including his longtime personal attorney Marc Kasowitz as well as Jay Sekulow, Michael Bowe, and John M. Dowd.

==== 2017 charges ====
In October 2017 Trump campaign adviser George Papadopoulos plead guilty to making false statements to FBI investigators about his connections to Russia. Papadopoulos had lied to the FBI about contact with Russian agents who offered the campaign "thousands" of damaging emails about Clinton months before then candidate Donald Trump asked Russia to "find" Hillary Clinton's missing emails. His plea agreement said a Russian operative had told a campaign aide "the Russians had emails of Clinton" and offered to share "thousands" of them with the campaign. Papadopoulos agreed to cooperate with prosecutors as part of the plea bargain.

Later that month, former Trump campaign chairman Paul Manafort surrendered to the FBI after being indicted on multiple charges. His business associate Rick Gates was also indicted and surrendered to the FBI. The pair were indicted on one count of conspiracy against the United States, one count of conspiracy to launder money, one count of being an unregistered agent of a foreign principal, one count of making false and misleading FARA statements, and one count of making false statements. Manafort was charged with four counts of failing to file reports of foreign bank and financial accounts while Gates was charged with three. All charges arise from their consulting work for a pro-Russian government in Ukraine and are unrelated to the campaign. It was widely believed that the charges against Manafort are intended to pressure him into becoming a cooperating witness about Russian interference in the 2016 election. In February 2018, Gates pleaded guilty to fraud-related charges and agreed to testify against Manafort. In April 2018, when Manafort's lawyers filed a motion to suppress the evidence obtained during the July 26 raid on Manafort's home, the warrants for the search were revealed and indicated that, in addition to seeking evidence related to Manafort's work in Ukraine, Mueller's investigation also concerned Manafort's actions during the Trump campaign including the meeting with a Russian lawyer and a counterintelligence officer at the Trump Tower meeting on June 9, 2016.

In March 2018, it was announced that prosecutors had established links between Rick Gates and an individual with ties to Russian intelligence which occurred while Gates worked on Trump's campaign. A report filed by prosecutors, concerning the sentencing of Gates and Manafort associate Alex van der Zwaan who lied to Mueller's investigators, alleges that Gates knew the individual he was in contact with had these connections.

==== 2018 indictments ====
On February 16, 2018, a Federal grand jury in Washington, D.C., indicted 13 Russian nationals and three Russian entities on charges of conspiracy to defraud the United States, conspiracy to commit bank and wire fraud, and fraud with identification documents, in connection with the 2016 United States national elections. The 37-page indictment cites the illegal use of social media "to sow political discord, including actions that supported the presidential candidacy of Donald Trump and disparaged his opponent, Hillary Clinton." On the same day, Robert Mueller announced that Richard Pinedo had pleaded guilty to using the identities of other people in connection with unlawful activity.

Lawyers representing Concord Management and Consulting appeared on May 9, 2018, in federal court in Washington, to plead not guilty to the charges. The prosecutors subsequently withdrew the charges.

Twelve Russians were indicted for hacking at a press conference on July 13, 2018.

On July 13, 2018, Deputy Attorney General Rod Rosenstein released indictments returned by a grand jury charging twelve Russian intelligence officials, who work for the Russian intelligence agency GRU, with conspiring to interfere in the 2016 elections. The individuals, posing as "a Guccifer 2.0 persona", are accused of hacking into computers of the Clinton campaign and the Democratic National Committee, as well as state election boards and secretaries of several states. In one unidentified state, the Russians stole information on half a million voters. The indictment also said a Republican congressional candidate, also unidentified, had been sent campaign documents stolen by the group, and that a reporter was in contact with the Russian operatives and offered to write an article to coincide with the release of the stolen documents.

==== Final report and Barr letter ====
The Mueller Report (redacted)

On March 24, Attorney General Barr sent a four-page letter to Congress regarding the special counsel's findings. Barr said that on the question of Russian interference in the election, Mueller detailed two ways in which Russia attempted to influence the election in Trump's favor, but "did not establish that members of the Trump Campaign conspired or coordinated with the Russian government in its election interference activities." On the question of obstruction of justice, Barr said that Mueller wrote "while this report does not conclude that the President committed a crime, it also does not exonerate him." "The Special Counsel's decision to describe the facts of his obstruction investigation without reaching any legal conclusions leaves it 'to the Attorney General to determine whether the conduct described in the report constitutes a crime ... Deputy Attorney General Rod Rosenstein and I have concluded that the evidence developed during the Special Counsel's investigation is not sufficient to establish that the President committed an obstruction-of-justice offense."

On April 18, 2019, a redacted version of the final Mueller Report was released to the public. The Mueller Report found that the Russian government interfered in the election in "sweeping and systematic fashion" and violated U.S. criminal laws. It documented 14 different forms of collusion between the Trump campaign and Russians. Reporter Ryan Goodman described the findings as "a series of activities that show strong evidence of collusion. Or, more precisely, [the report] provides significant evidence that Trump Campaign associates coordinated with, cooperated with, encouraged, or gave support to the Russia/WikiLeaks election interference activities."

On May 29, 2019, Mueller announced that he was retiring as special counsel and the office would be shut down, and he spoke publicly about the report for the first time. He reiterated that his report did not exonerate the president and that legal guidelines prevented the indictment of a sitting president, stating that "the Constitution requires a process other than the criminal justice system to formally accuse a sitting president of wrongdoing." Saying, "The report is my testimony", he indicated he would have nothing to say that was not already in the report. He emphasized that the central conclusion of his investigation was "that there were multiple, systematic efforts to interfere in our election. That allegation deserves the attention of every American."

==== Later developments ====
On November 2, the special counsel's office released previously redacted portions of the Mueller report. In September, a federal judge ordered the passages disclosed in response to a Freedom of Information Act (FOIA) lawsuit filed by BuzzFeed News and the advocacy group Electronic Privacy Information Center, while allowing other portions to remain redacted.

In summary, per Buzzfeed: "Although Wikileaks published emails stolen from the DNC in July and October 2016 and Stone — a close associate to Donald Trump — appeared to know in advance the materials were coming, investigators 'did not have sufficient evidence' to prove active participation in the hacks or knowledge that the electronic thefts were continuing. In addition, federal prosecutors could not establish that the hacked emails amounted to campaign contributions benefitting Trump's election chances ..."

The newly released material also stated: "While the investigation developed evidence that the GRU's hacking efforts in fact were continuing at least at the time of the July 2016 WikiLeaks dissemination, ... the Office did not develop sufficient admissible evidence that WikiLeaks knew of – or even was willfully blind to – that fact." As reported by Buzzfeed, "Likewise, prosecutors faced what they called factual hurdles in pursuing Stone for the hack."

=== Investigation into financial flows ===
By January 2017, a multi-agency investigation, conducted by the FBI, the CIA, the NSA, the Justice Department, the Financial Crimes Enforcement Network and representatives of the DNI, was underway looking into how the Russian government may have secretly financed efforts to help Trump win the election. They had been conducted over several months by six federal agencies. Investigations into Carter Page, Paul Manafort and Roger Stone were underway on January 19, the eve of the presidential inauguration.

==== Money funneled through the NRA ====
By January 2018, the FBI was investigating the possible funneling of illegal money by Aleksandr Torshin, a deputy governor of the Central Bank of Russia, through the National Rifle Association of America, which was then used to help Donald Trump win the presidency. Torshin is known to have close connections both to Russia's president Vladimir Putin and to the NRA, and he has been charged with money laundering in other countries.

The NRA reported spending $30 million to support the 2016 Trump campaign, three times what it spent on Mitt Romney in 2012, and spent more than any other independent group including the leading Trump superPAC. Sources with connections to the NRA have stated that the actual amount spent was much higher than $30 million. The subunits within the organization which made the donations are not generally required to disclose their donors.

Spanish special prosecutor José Grinda Gonzalez has said that in early 2018 the Spanish police gave wiretapped audio to the FBI of telephone discussions between Torshin, and convicted money launderer and mafia boss Alexander Romanov. Torshin met with Donald Trump Jr. at an NRA event in May 2016 while attempting to broker a meeting between Donald Trump and Vladimir Putin.

Maria Butina, a Russian anti-gun control activist who has served as a special assistant to Torshin and came to the U.S. on a student visa to attend university classes in Washington, claimed both before and after the election that she was part of the Trump campaign's communications with Russia. Like Torshin, she cultivated a close relationship with the NRA. In February 2016, Butina started a consulting business called Bridges LLC with Republican political operative Paul Erickson. During Trump's presidential campaign Erickson contacted Rick Dearborn, one of Trump's advisors, writing in an email that he had close ties both to the NRA and to Russia, and asking how a back-channel meeting between Trump and Putin could be set up. The email was later turned over to federal investigators as part of the inquiry into Russia's meddling in the presidential election. On July 15, 2018, Butina was arrested by the Federal Bureau of Investigation and charged with conspiring to act as an unregistered Russian agent who had attempted to create a backchannel of communications between American Republicans/conservatives and Russian officials by infiltrating the National Rifle Association, the National Prayer Breakfast, and conservative religious organizations.

==== Money from Russian oligarchs ====
As of April 2018, Mueller's investigators were examining whether Russian oligarchs directly or indirectly provided illegal cash donations to the Trump campaign and inauguration. Investigators were examining whether oligarchs invested in American companies or think tanks having political action committees connected to the campaign, as well as money funneled through American straw donors to the Trump campaign and inaugural fund. At least one oligarch, Viktor Vekselberg, was detained and his electronic devices searched as he arrived at a New York area airport on his private jet in early 2018. Vekselberg was questioned about hundreds of thousands of dollars in payments made to Michael Cohen after the election, through Columbus Nova, the American affiliate of Vekselberg's Renova Group. Another oligarch was also detained on a recent trip to the United States, but it is unclear if he was searched. Investigators have also asked a third oligarch who has not traveled to the United States to voluntarily provide documents and an interview.

=== Durham inquiry ===
Soon after the release of the Mueller Report, Trump began urging an investigation into the origins of the Russian investigation, wanting to "investigate the investigators". In April 2019, Attorney General William Barr announced that he had launched a review of the origins of the FBI's investigation. The origins of the probe were already being investigated by the Justice Department's inspector general and by U.S. attorney John Huber, who was appointed in 2018 by Jeff Sessions. He assigned U.S. attorney John Durham to lead it.

Durham was given the authority "to broadly examin[e] the government's collection of intelligence involving the Trump campaign's interactions with Russians", reviewing government documents and requesting voluntary witness statements. Trump directed the American intelligence community to "promptly provide assistance and information" to Barr, and delegated to him the "full and complete authority" to declassify any documents related to his probe. In September 2019, it was reported that Barr has been contacting foreign governments to ask for help in this mission. He personally traveled to the United Kingdom and Italy to seek information, and at Barr's request Trump phoned the prime minister of Australia about the subject.

On November 2, 2020, the day before the presidential election, New York magazine reported that:

According to two sources familiar with the probe, there has been no evidence found, after 18 months of investigation, to support Barr's claims that Trump was targeted by politically biased Obama officials to prevent his election. (The probe remains ongoing.) In fact, the sources said, the Durham investigation has so far uncovered no evidence of any wrongdoing by Biden or Barack Obama, or that they were even involved with the Russia investigation. There 'was no evidence … not even remotely … indicating Obama or Biden did anything wrong,' as one person put it.

== International investigations ==
In December 2019, Switzerland extradited Russian businessman Vladislav Klyushin to the United States, where it was reported that he would face questions about the Russian government's interference in the 2016 election, though the US Government has not publicly implicated him.

=== Claims by Anastasia Vashukevich ===
In March 2018, Anastasia Vashukevich, a Belarusian national arrested in Thailand, said she had over 16 hours of audio recordings that could shed light on possible Russian interference in American elections. She offered the recordings to American authorities in exchange for asylum, to avoid being extradited to Belarus. Vashukevich said she was close to Oleg Deripaska, a Russian oligarch with ties to Putin and business links to Paul Manafort, and asserted the recordings included Deripaska discussing the 2016 presidential election. She said some of the recorded conversations, which she asserted were made in August 2016, included three individuals who spoke fluent English and who she believed were Americans. Vashukevich's claims appeared to be consistent with a video published in February 2018 by Alexei Navalny, about a meeting between Deripaska and Russian deputy prime minister Sergei Eduardovich Prikhodko. In the video, Navalny claims Deripaska served as a liaison between the Russian government and Paul Manafort in connection with Russian interference efforts.

In August 2018, Vashukevich said she no longer has any evidence having sent the recordings to Deripaska without having made them public, hoping he would gain her release from prison, and has promised Deripaska not to make any further comment on the recordings' contents.

== Subsequent developments ==
=== Admission of campaign by Yevgeny Prigozhin ===
In November 2022, Russian oligarch Yevgeny Prigozhin, founder of the Internet Research Agency, admitted to Russian interference in U.S. elections. CNN reported that "his statement appeared to be the first admission of a high-level Russian campaign to interfere in US elections from someone close to the Kremlin."

Prigozhin had been indicted along with 12 other Russian nationals and 3 Russian firms in 2018 as part of the Mueller investigation. In 2020, the Justice department had dismissed the indictments against Prigozhin's catering firm Concord, because the inability to punish the indicted would possibly lead to the exposure of law enforcement techniques in the process of trial. In July 2022 the State Department offered a $10 million reward for information on Prigozhin and the Internet Research Agency among other Russian interference mechanisms. Prigozhin's admission of election interference in November followed his admission of funding the Kremlin-linked far-right mercenary Wagner Group in September 2022. He had also been placed on the FBI's Most Wanted list in 2021.

U.S. officials were left unsurprised by the Russian oligarch's confession, which was phrased as a vague threat. "Gentlemen, we interfered, we interfere and we will interfere... Carefully, precisely, surgically and in our own way, as we know how. During our pinpoint operations, we will remove both kidneys and the liver at once." Prigozhin long having been sanctioned by the United States, the timing and vagueness of his admission could include elements of disinformation, with White House press secretary Karine Jean-Pierre describing it as one of many Russian narratives "aimed at undermining democracy". She stated the oligarch's comments "do not tell us anything new or surprising."

State Department spokesman Ned Price said that "His bold confession, if anything, appears to be just a manifestation of the impunity that crooks and cronies enjoy under President Putin and the Kremlin... As you know, we have sanctioned this individual, Yevgeny Prigozhin, since 2018 for his interference with our election processes and institutions."

On November 17, 2022, Republican political operative Jesse Benton was convicted by a federal jury for a 2016 scheme to funnel Russian money to the Donald Trump campaign. According to court documents, Benton caused a Russian foreign national to wire $100,000 to his consulting firm, of which $25,000 of the money from the Russian national was contributed to the Trump campaign.

=== Loss of classified information during Trump-Biden transition ===
In December 2023, CNN reported that:

a binder containing highly classified information related to Russian election interference went missing at the end of Donald Trump’s presidency, raising alarms among intelligence officials that some of the most closely guarded national security secrets from the US and its allies could be exposed [...] In the two-plus years since Trump left office, the missing intelligence does not appear to have been found. The binder contained raw intelligence the US and its NATO allies collected on Russians and Russian agents, including sources and methods that informed the US government’s assessment that Russian President Vladimir Putin sought to help Trump win the 2016 election. [...]

According to the report, in the final days of his presidency, Donald Trump intended to declassify and release publicly multiple documents related to the FBI's Russia investigation. Several copies of the binder, with varying levels of redactions, ended up in the Justice Department and the National Archives, but an unredacted version went missing.

=== Re-examination of 2016 intelligence assessment by John Ratcliffe ===
In July 2025 CIA director John Ratcliffe, a Trump appointee, released an internal review which said the 2016 intelligence assessment was rushed but was not wrong about Russia wanting the election of Donald Trump. The review criticized John Brennan, CIA director during the assessment, for his management of the effort. Ratcliffe said the assessment was conducted under a "corrupt process" in "politically charged environments". The review said the assessment's high confidence was sound that Russia intended to undermine American faith in democracy and disparage presidential candidate Hillary Clinton.

The New York Times reported that former intelligence officials "were divided over the new report", but most noted the review did not dispute the original assessment's finding of Russian malign influence in 2016.

Ratcliffe and Durham also created and advanced the unproven Clinton plan intelligence conspiracy theory based on Russian intelligence material and hacked and manipulated emails described by journalists and investigators as likely Russian disinformation.

=== Release of information by Tulsi Gabbard ===
In July 2025, Tulsi Gabbard, the Director of National Intelligence, released a previously classified report prepared by Republicans on the House Intelligence Committee. The report claimed that former President Obama's administration had manipulated intelligence to suggest that Russia had sought to damage Hillary Clinton's campaign, and boost Trump's campaign, in the 2016 presidential election. Gabbard claimed that this report, which was made in September 2020, provided "irrefutable evidence" of a "treasonous conspiracy", directly implicating Obama, to undermine the results of the 2016 election.

The report did not question the Intelligence Community Assessment that Putin ordered interference operations and hack-and-leak efforts against Clinton. The report also noted that most assessments "employed proper tradecraft and were consistent with observed Russian behavior". The report concluded by recommending strengthening the peer review process for controversial assessments, and suggested that political appointees should recuse themselves during such assessments made in between presidential transitions, among other recommendations.

In response, Obama dismissed the allegations as "outrageous and ridiculous" and "a weak attempt at distraction". House Democrats also noted that a similar review conducted by the Senate Intelligence Committee, chaired by Richard Burr and later Marco Rubio, did not find the same issues as the House review.

== Commentary and reactions ==
=== Public opinion ===
Polls conducted in early January 2017 showed that 55% of respondents believed Russia interfered in the election; 51% believed Russia intervened through hacking. As of February 2017 public-opinion polls showed a partisan split on the importance of Russia's involvement in the 2016 election. The broader issue of the Trump administration's relationship with Russia didn't register among the most important problems facing the U.S. An NBC News/Wall Street Journal poll found that 53 percent wanted a Congressional inquiry into communications in 2016 between the Trump campaign and Russian officials. Quinnipiac University found that 47 percent thought it was very important. A March 2017 poll conducted by the Associated Press and NORC found about 62% of respondents say they are at least moderately concerned about the possibility that Trump or his campaign had inappropriate contacts with Russia during the 2016 campaign.

A January 2017 poll conducted by the Levada Center, Russia's largest independent polling organization, showed that only 12% of Russian respondents believed Russia "definitely" or "probably" interfered in the U.S. election. A December 2017 survey conducted by the Levada Center found that 31% of Russian respondents thought their government tried to influence U.S. domestic affairs in a significant way.

A Quinnipiac University poll conducted in late March and early April 2017 found that 68% of voters supported "an independent commission investigating the potential links between some of Donald Trump's campaign advisors and the Russian government". An April 2017 NBC News/Wall Street Journal poll found that respondents had little confidence in Congress's investigation into the Russian interference in the election. The poll found that approximately 73% supported a "nonpartisan, independent commission" to look into Russia's involvement in the election. An ABC News/Washington Post poll conducted in April 2017 found that 56 percent of respondents thought Russia tried to influence the election.

A May 2017 Monmouth University poll, conducted after the dismissal of James Comey, found that "nearly 6-in-10 Americans thought it was either very (40%) or somewhat (19%) likely that Comey was fired in order to slow down or stop the FBI investigation into Russian interference in the 2016 election and possible links with the Trump campaign." Like other recent opinion polls, a majority, 73%, said that the FBI investigation should continue.

A June 2017 NBC News/Wall Street Journal poll found that respondents were more likely to believe James Comey over Trump when it came to their differing accounts behind the reasons for Comey's dismissal. The survey found that 45% of respondents were more likely to believe Comey than Trump. The poll also found that the number of respondents disapproving of Trump's decision to fire Comey, 46%, was higher than when the same question was asked in May of the same year. 53% of respondents said that they believed that Russia interfered in the 2016 presidential election, however the number changes by party affiliation. 78% of Democrats said that they believed there was interference, versus 26% of Republicans who agreed. An NPR/PBS NewsHour/Marist College poll conducted in late June 2017 found that 54% of respondents believed that Trump either did "something illegal" or "something unethical, but not illegal" in his dealings with Russian president Vladimir Putin. The poll found that 73% of Republicans said Trump himself has done "nothing wrong" while 41% of Democrats believed that Trump did something that was illegal. In addition, 47% said that they thought Russia was a major threat to future U.S. elections, while 13% of respondents said that Russia posed no threat at all.

A July 2017 ABC News/Washington Post poll found that 63% of respondents said that it "was inappropriate for Trump's son, son-in-law and campaign manager to have met with a Russian lawyer during the campaign." The poll also found that six in ten overall who think that Russia tried to influence the election, with 72% saying that they thought that Trump benefited and that "67 percent thought that members of his campaign intentionally helped those efforts."

Polls conducted in August 2017 found widespread disapproval and distrust of Trump's handling of the investigation. A CNN/SSRS poll conducted in early August found that only 31% of respondents approved of Trump's handling of the matter. The poll also noted that 60% of adults "thought that it was a serious matter that should be fully investigated." On party lines, the poll found that 15% of Democrats and 56% of Republicans approved of Trump's handling of the matter. A Gallup poll from the same month found similar trends. The poll found that 25% of respondents said Trump acted illegally in dealings with the Russians. The poll found that 6% of Republicans and Republican-leaners thought Trump did something illegal in his dealings with the Russians. A poll conducted by the Public Religion Research Institute found that 58% of respondents expressed a negative view of Russia, while 25% had a favorable view of the country. The poll also found that 48% believed "there is clear evidence that Russia interfered in the 2016 election to help the Trump campaign." The broader issue of the Trump administration's relationship with Russia, however, was not identified by more than one percent of respondents in Gallup tracking of 'Most Important Problem' at any point since February 2017. (As of July 2018, it was less than half a percent.)

A July 2018 an online Ipsos poll found that 60% of American believed that Russia interfered in the 2016 presidential election with 85% of democrats and 53% of Independents believing so compared to 46% of Republicans. 66% of democrats approved of the special counsel investigation compared to 32% of Republicans and 36% of Independents. In addition 75% of republicans believed the special counsel investigation was the result of anti-Trump bias. Compared to 32% of democrats and 36% of independents.

A July 2018 Ipsos/Reuters poll found that 56% of Americans believed that Russia did interfere in support of Trump.

A March 2019 poll released after reports of the findings of the Mueller report found that 48% of respondents said they believed "Trump or someone from his campaign worked with Russia to influence the 2016 election"; 53% said "Trump tried to stop investigations into Russian influence on his administration"; and "Democrats [were] much more likely than Republicans to believe that Trump colluded with Russia and obstructed justice." In addition, 39% of respondents felt that Trump "should be impeached", while 49% said that he should not.

=== Hillary Clinton ===
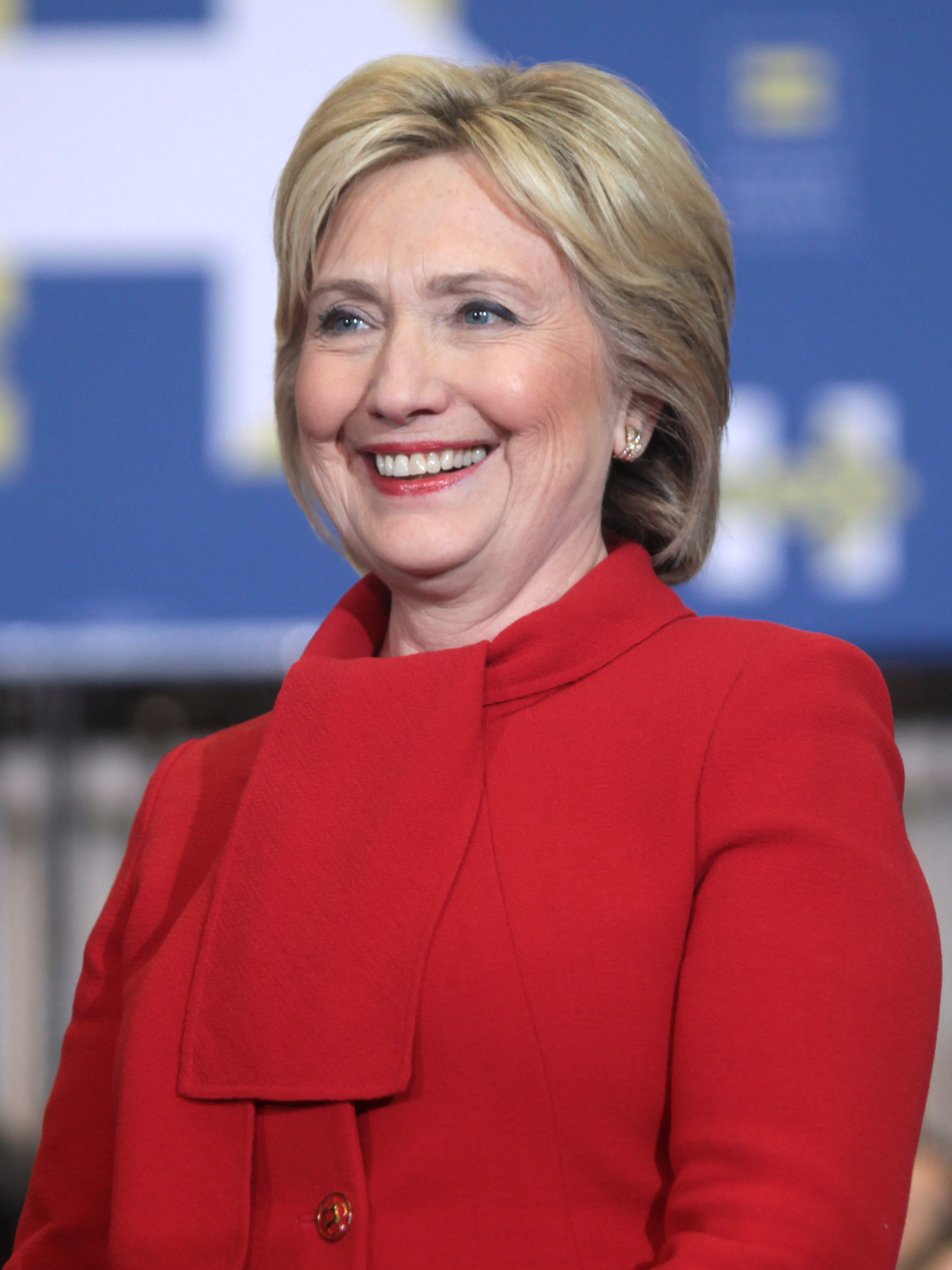
Hillary Clinton said Vladimir Putin held a grudge against her due to her criticism of the 2011 Russian legislative election.

On December 15, 2016, Hillary Clinton said she partially attributed her loss in the 2016 election to Russian meddling organized by Putin. Clinton said Putin had a personal grudge against her. She linked Putin's feelings about her to her criticism of the 2011 Russian legislative election, adding that he felt she was responsible for fomenting the 2011–2013 Russian protests. Clinton drew a specific connection from her 2011 assertions as U.S. secretary of state that Putin rigged the Russian elections that year to his efforts to influence the 2016 U.S. elections. During the third presidential debate, Clinton had stated that Putin favored Trump "because he'd rather have a puppet as president of the United States". Clinton said that by personally attacking her through meddling in the election, Putin attacked the American democratic system. She said the Russian cyberattacks did not just affect her candidacy, but were an attempt to attack the national security of the United States. Clinton acknowledged that she was unsuccessful in sufficiently publicizing to the media the cyberattacks against her campaign in the months leading up to the election. She voiced her support for a proposal put forth by senators from both parties, to set up an investigative panel to look into the matter akin to the 9/11 Commission.

=== Republican National Committee ===
Chief of staff-designate for Trump and outgoing RNC chairman Reince Priebus said in December 2016 that he still didn't know who hacked the DNC's computer servers.

The RNC said there was no intrusion into its servers, while acknowledging email accounts of individual Republicans (including Colin Powell) were breached. More than 200 emails from Colin Powell were posted on the website DC Leaks. Priebus appeared on Meet the Press on December 11, 2016, and discounted the CIA conclusions. Priebus said the FBI had investigated and found that RNC servers had not been hacked.

=== Donald Trump ===
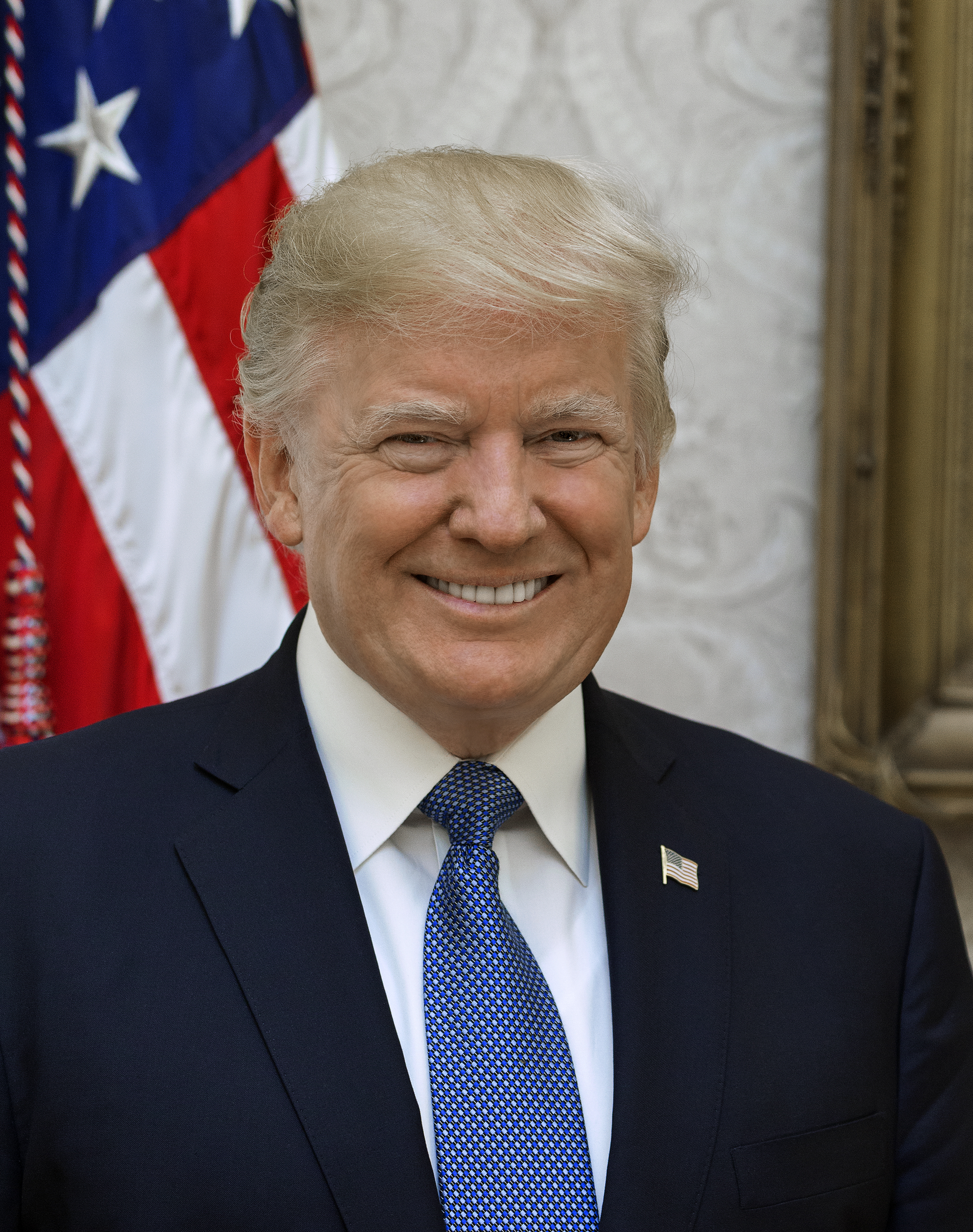
Trump's transition team dismissed the U.S. Intelligence Community's conclusions.

Trump and Putin answering questions from journalists on July 16, 2018. Video from the White House

Prior to his presidential run, Donald Trump made statements to Fox News in 2014 in which he agreed with an assessment by then FBI director James Comey about hacking against the U.S. by Russia and China. Trump was played a clip of Comey from 60 Minutes discussing the dangers of cyber attacks. Trump stated he agreed with the problem of cyber threats posed by China, and went on to emphasize there was a similar problem toward the U.S. posed by Russia.

In September 2016, during the first presidential debate, Trump said he doubted whether anyone knew who hacked the DNC, and disputed Russian interference. During the second debate, Trump said there might not have been hacking at all, and questioned why accountability was placed on Russia. During the third debate, Trump rejected Clinton's claim that Putin favored Trump.

After the election, Trump rejected the CIA analysis and asserted that the reports were politically motivated to deflect from the Democrats' electoral defeat. Trump's transition team said in a brief statement: "These are the same people that said Saddam Hussein had weapons of mass destruction." However, the intelligence analysts involved in monitoring Russian activities were different from those who assessed that Iraq had stockpiles of weapons of mass destruction, while post-Iraq War reforms have made it less likely for similar errors to reach the highest levels of the U.S. intelligence community. Trump dismissed reports of Russia's interference, calling them "ridiculous"; he placed blame on Democrats upset over election results for publicizing these reports, and cited Julian Assange's statement that "a 14-year-old kid could have hacked Podesta". After Obama expelled 35 Russian diplomats and announced further sanctions on Russia, Trump commended Putin for refraining from retaliatory measures against the United States until the Trump administration would lay out its policy toward Russia.

Excerpt of Trump at a press conference on January 11, 2017

On January 6, 2017, after meeting with members of U.S. intelligence agencies, Trump released a statement saying: cyberwarfare had no impact on the election and did not harm voting machines. In the same statement, he vowed to form a national cybersecurity task force to prepare an anti-hacking plan within 90 days of taking office. Referring to the Office of Personnel Management data breach in 2015, Trump said he was under a "political witch hunt" and wondered why there was no focus on China. Two days later, Reince Priebus said Trump had begun to acknowledge that "entities in Russia" were involved in the DNC leaks. On January 11, 2017, Trump conceded that Russia was probably the source of the leaks, although he also said it could have been another country.

On November 11, 2017, after meeting Vladimir Putin at a summit in Vietnam, Trump said, "I just asked him again. He said he absolutely did not meddle in our election. ... Every time he sees me he says: 'I didn't do that,' and I really believe that when he tells me that, he means it." Trump went on to contrast Putin's "very strongly, vehemently" spoken denials with the word of American former intelligence officials who he termed as "political hacks": John Brennan, James Clapper, and the "liar" and "leaker" James Comey. But a day later, when asked to clarify his comments, Trump said, "As to whether I believe it or not, I'm with our [intelligence] agencies, especially as currently constituted." Brennan and Clapper, appearing on CNN, expressed concern that Trump was "giving Putin a pass" and showing the Russian leader that "Donald Trump can be played by foreign leaders who are going to appeal to his ego and try to play upon his insecurities."

In 2019, The Washington Post revealed that (according to former officials) in May 2017 Trump had privately told Russian officials Sergey Lavrov and Sergey Kislyak he wasn't concerned about Russia interfering in American elections. In early October 2022, The New York Times reported that Trump had retained secret government documents found by the FBI at his Mar-a-Lago domicile earlier the same year with the intention of pressuring the agency into trading them for files allegedly substantiating his claims that any Russian interference during the election was a "hoax", as he had constantly maintained in public.

==== Trump viewed as under Putin's influence ====
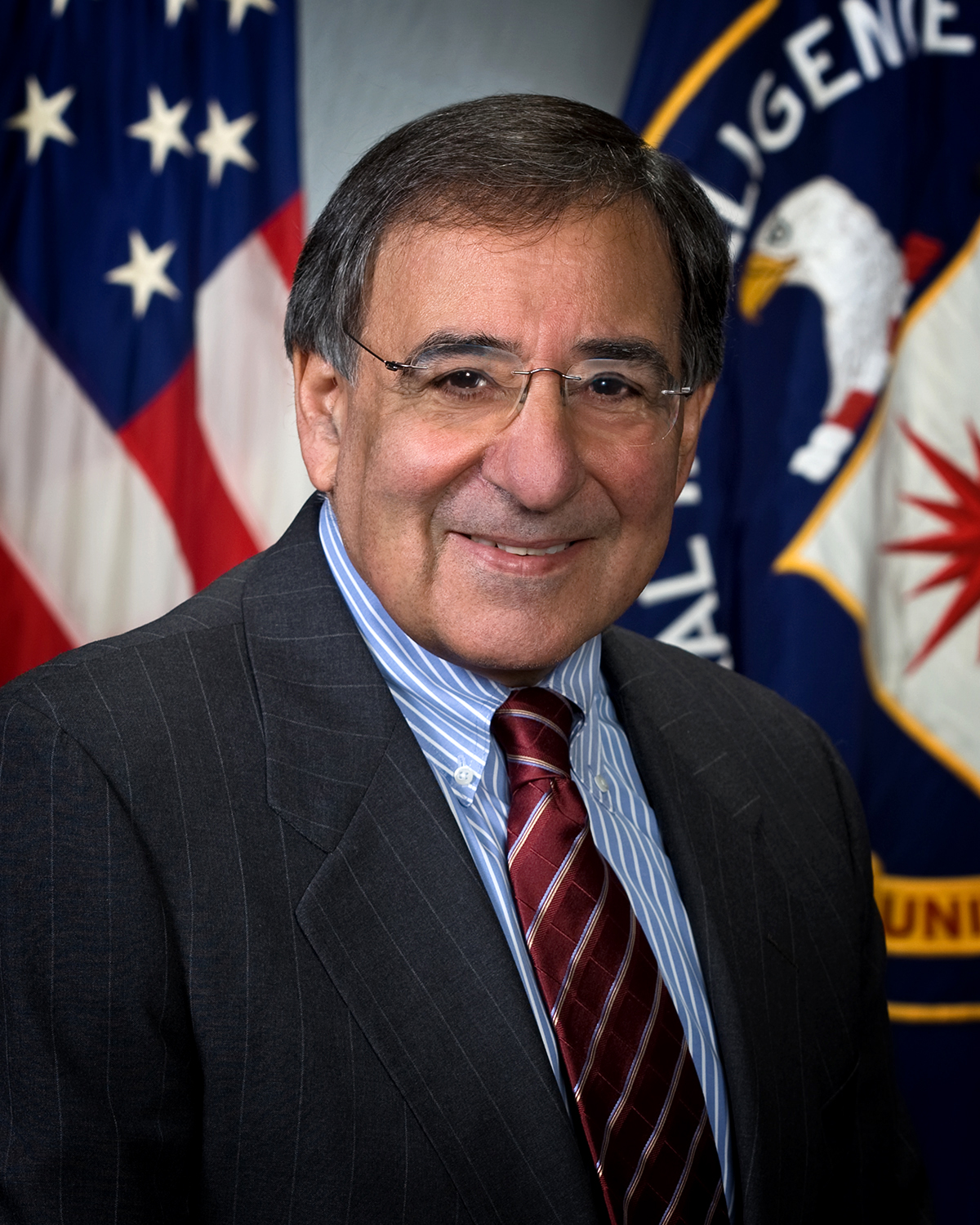
Panetta as Director of the CIA

Tim Weiner writes that experienced intelligence personnel, such as "veteran American spies, spymasters, and spy-catchers", including Leon Panetta, have described Trump as an "agent of influence", someone who uses his position, power, and influence in the interests of an enemy power:

Leon Panetta, who ran the CIA and the Pentagon under President Obama, has no doubt about it. He told me that, by any definition, 'Trump, for all intents and purposes, acts as an agent of influence of Russia.' ... [Many] veteran American spies, spymasters, and spy-catchers ... concur with Panetta. But they have other theories as well. There's the useful idiot scenario. Or maybe it's money: the Russians might have kompromat—compromising information—about Trump's finances. And some think it might be worse than that.

The Steele dossier alleges that the Russians have kompromat on Trump which could be used to blackmail him, and that the Kremlin promised the kompromat will not be used as long as he continues his cooperation with them. Trump's actions at the Helsinki summit in 2018 "led many to conclude that Steele's report was more accurate than not. ... Trump sided with the Russians over the U.S. intelligence community's assessment that Moscow had waged an all-out attack on the 2016 election ... The joint news conference ... cemented fears among some that Trump was in Putin's pocket and prompted bipartisan backlash."

At the joint news conference, when asked directly about the subject, Putin denied that he had any kompromat on Trump. Even though Trump was reportedly given a "gift from Putin" the weekend of the pageant, Putin argued "that he did not even know Trump was in Russia for the Miss Universe pageant in 2013 when, according to the Steele dossier, video of Trump was secretly recorded to blackmail him."

In reaction to Trump's actions at the summit, Senator Chuck Schumer (D-N.Y.) spoke in the Senate:

Millions of Americans will continue to wonder if the only possible explanation for this dangerous and inexplicable behavior is the possibility—the very real possibility—that President Putin holds damaging information over President Trump.

Several operatives and lawyers in the U.S. intelligence community reacted strongly to Trump's performance at the summit. They described it as "subservien[ce] to Putin" and a "fervent defense of Russia's military and cyber aggression around the world, and its violation of international law in Ukraine" which they saw as "harmful to U.S. interests". They also suggested that he was either a "Russian asset" or a "useful idiot" for Putin, and that he looked like "Putin's puppet". Former director of national intelligence James Clapper wondered "if Russians have something on Trump", and former CIA director John O. Brennan, who has accused Trump of "treason", tweeted: "He is wholly in the pocket of Putin."

Former acting CIA director Michael Morell has called Trump "an unwitting agent of the Russian federation", and former CIA director Michael V. Hayden said Trump was a "useful fool" who is "manipulated by Moscow". House speaker Nancy Pelosi questioned Trump's loyalty when she asked him: "[Why do] all roads lead to Putin?"

Ynet, an Israeli online news site, reported on January 12, 2017, that U.S. intelligence had advised Israeli intelligence officers to be cautious about sharing information with the incoming Trump administration, until the possibility of Russian influence over Trump, suggested by Steele's report, has been fully investigated.

Ex-spy Yuri Shvets, who was a partner of the assassinated Alexander Litvinenko, believes that the KGB cultivated Trump as an asset for over 40 years. Yuri Shvets, a source for journalist Craig Unger, compared the former president to the Cambridge Five who passed secrets to Moscow. Shvets believes that Semyon Kislin was a "spotter agent" who identified Trump as an asset in 1980. Among other things Shvets highlights Trump's visit to the Soviet Union in 1987. Yuri Shvets believes Trump was fed KGB talking points. For example, after Trump's return to New York, Trump took out full-page ads in major newspapers criticizing American allies and spending on NATO. Yuri Shvets claims that at the chief KGB directorate in Yasenevo, he received a cable celebrating the ad as a successful "active measure". Shvets described the Mueller Report as a "big disappointment" because it focused only on "crime-related issues" rather than "counterintelligence aspects".

Journalist Luke Harding argued that Trump's visit to the Soviet Union in 1987 was arranged by the KGB as part of KGB overtures to recruit a wider variety of agents.

==== Trump's "Russiagate hoax" claims ====
Russian interference in U.S. elections has been termed "Russiagate", referring to suspicions of collusion between the Trump 2016 presidential campaign and Russian actors. Renée DiResta, a professor who has advised Congress on preventing disinformation, noted that over time the word's meaning has flipped. She said a newer more common usage is a denial by Trump and his followers of the original definition, which they invert, describing Russiagate as a "hoax". They use the term to delegitimize accusations and investigations of alleged impropriety, cooperation, collusion, or conspiracy between the Trump campaign and the government, officials, and intelligence agencies of Russia. They assert that such accusations are a hoax perpetrated against Trump by Hillary Clinton and that he is the victim of a witch hunt and a "conspiracy theory" that is "invented, funded, and spread by President Trump's political rivals". According to DiResta, the right and MAGA have been "rewriting the past to fit the desirable present", using the term to deny that any interference or collusion even took place.

PolitiFact named Trump's false claim the "2017 Lie of the Year", and the "hoax" accusation and its associated conspiracy theories have been debunked by numerous sources and contradicted by investigative findings of what "the president, members of his campaign and his associates actually did".

The Steele dossier, which has been described as unreliable, alleged that there was a well-developed "conspiracy" of "cooperation" between the Trump campaign and Russian leadership intended to benefit Trump. While a formal criminal "conspiracy" has not been corroborated, the Democratic members of the Senate Intelligence Committee did find the alleged "cooperation".

The two main government investigations are the Mueller report and the Senate Intelligence Committee report. Unlike the Mueller report, which was limited "to a review of criminal activity", the Committee went much deeper by including "counterintelligence questions in its investigative remit". The Committee apparently decided "to draw no conclusions, merely to recount facts". It thus did not "explicitly state" that there was "no collusion".

Some of the Republicans wrote in an appendix:

Volume 5 is an important contribution to the historical record from which historians will someday draw. As is evident to those who read all five volumes of the Committee's report, the Russian government inappropriately meddled in our 2016 general election in many ways but then-Candidate Trump was not complicit. After more than three years of investigation by this Committee, we can now say with no doubt, there was no collusion. (Emphasis in original)

Democratic members wrote separately that they found "cooperation":

The Committee's bipartisan Report unambiguously shows that members of the Trump Campaign cooperated with Russian efforts to get Trump elected. It recounts efforts by Trump and his team to obtain dirt on their opponent from operatives acting on behalf of the Russian government. It reveals the extraordinary lengths by which Trump and his associates actively sought to enable the Russian interference operation by amplifying its electoral impact and rewarding its perpetrators - even after being warned of its Russian origins. And it presents, for the first time, concerning evidence that the head of the Trump Campaign was directly connected to the Russian meddling through his communications with an individual found to be a Russian intelligence officer.
It is our conclusion, based on the facts detailed in the Committee's Report, that the Russian intelligence services' assault on the integrity of the 2016 U.S. electoral process[,] and Trump and his associates' participation in and enabling of this Russian activity, represents one of the single most grave counterintelligence threats to American national security in the modern era.

=== Mike Pence ===
In an interview on February 14, 2018, Pence said, "Irrespective of efforts that were made in 2016 by foreign powers, it is the universal conclusion of our intelligence communities that none of those efforts had any impact on the outcome of the 2016 election." (In fact, in January 2017 the intelligence community had published a statement saying, "We did not make an assessment of the impact that Russian activities had on the outcome of the 2016 election.") Pence added, "It doesn't mean that there weren't efforts, and we do know there were—there were efforts by Russia and likely by other countries. We take that very seriously."

=== Intelligence community ===
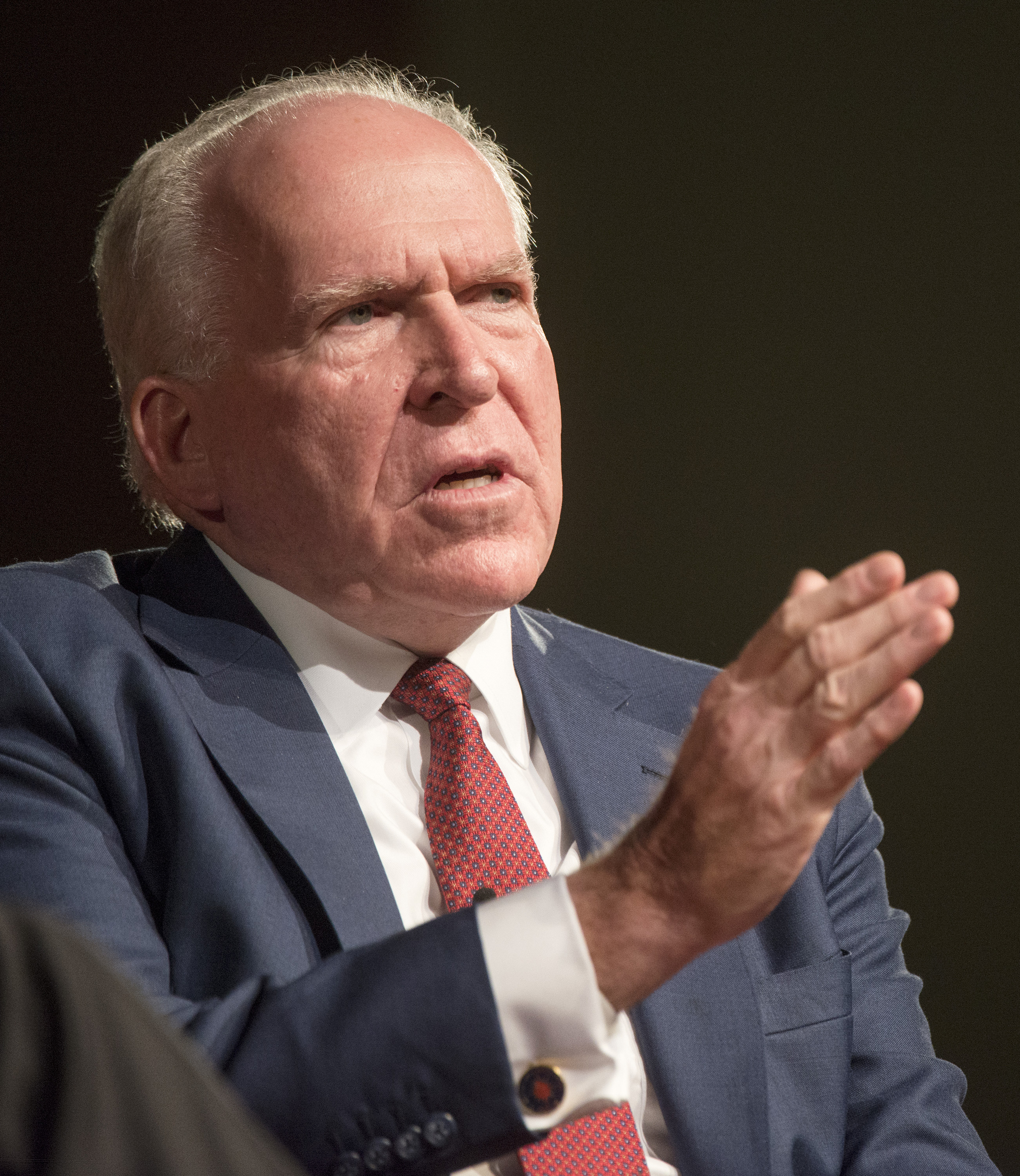
Brennan in 2018

On May 23, 2017, former CIA director John Brennan expressed his alarm about collusion between the Russians and Trump campaign:

Brennan did not say there was no evidence of collusion. He made clear he had been alarmed by the extent of contacts between the Trump team and Moscow....Brennan stressed repeatedly that collusion may have been unwitting, at least at first as Russian intelligence was deft at disguising its approaches to would-be agents. 'Frequently, individuals on a treasonous path do not even realize they're on that path until it gets to be too late', he said.

On August 16, 2018, Brennan stated that Trump's claims of "no collusion" with Russia were "hogwash":

The only questions that remain are whether the collusion that took place constituted criminally liable conspiracy, whether obstruction of justice occurred to cover up any collusion or conspiracy, and how many members of 'Trump Incorporated' attempted to defraud the government by laundering and concealing the movement of money into their pockets.

The CIA assessment, and Trump's dismissal of it, created an unprecedented rupture between the president-elect and the intelligence community. On December 11, 2016, U.S. intelligence officials responded to Trump's denunciation of their findings in a written statement, and expressed dismay that Trump disputed their conclusions as politically motivated or inaccurate. They wrote that intelligence officials were motivated to defend U.S. national security. Members of the intelligence community feared reprisals from Donald Trump once he took office.

Former CIA director Michael Morell said foreign interference in U.S. elections was an existential threat. Former CIA spokesman George E. Little condemned Trump for dismissing the CIA assessment, saying the president-elect's atypical response was disgraceful and denigrated the courage of those who serve in the CIA at risk to their own lives.

Former NSA director and CIA director Michael V. Hayden posited that Trump's antagonizing the Intelligence Community signaled the administration would rely less on intelligence for policy-making. Independent presidential candidate and former CIA intelligence officer Evan McMullin criticized the Republican leadership for failing to respond adequately to Russia's meddling in the election process. McMullin said Republican politicians were aware that publicly revealed information about Russia's interference was likely the tip of the iceberg relative to the actual threat. Former NSA director Michael V. Hayden has stated that Russia's interference in the 2016 presidential election is the "most successful covert influence operation in history". Hayden went further saying that Trump was a "useful fool ... manipulated by Moscow".

A January 2017 report by the director of national intelligence said that the intelligence community did "not make an assessment of the impact that Russian activities had on the outcome of the 2016 election". Despite this, CIA Director Mike Pompeo claimed that "the Russian meddling that took place did not affect the outcome of the election" at an event hosted by the Foundation for Defense of Democracies on October 19, 2017. CIA agency spokesman Dean Boyd withdrew his remarks the next day saying they had been made in error.

Retired general H. R. McMaster, who was Trump's national security adviser, "after he was asked whether he agreed that the president posed the greatest threat to U.S. election integrity", said that "Donald Trump is 'aiding and abetting' Russian President Vladimir Putin's efforts to sow doubt about the American electoral system."

=== Electoral College ===
On December 10, 2016, ten electors, headed by Christine Pelosi, daughter of former United States speaker of the House Nancy Pelosi (D-CA), wrote an open letter to the director of national intelligence, James Clapper, demanding an intelligence briefing on investigations into foreign intervention in the presidential election. Fifty-eight additional electors subsequently added their names to the letter, bringing the total to 68 electors from 17 different states. The Clinton campaign supported the call for a classified briefing for electors. On December 16, 2016, the briefing request was denied.

=== Russia ===
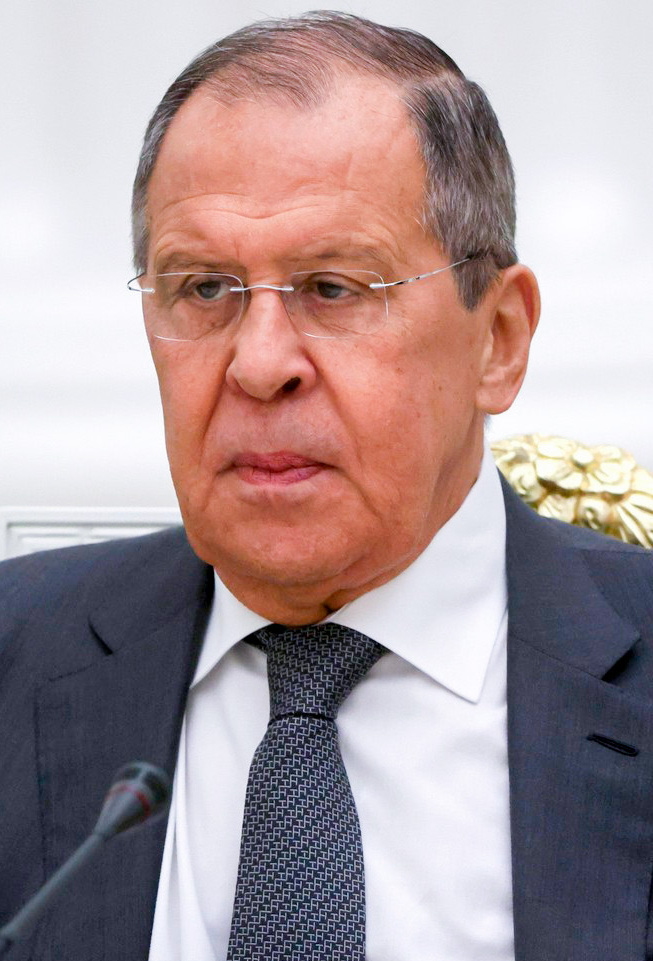
Russian Foreign Minister Sergey Lavrov called American accusations "nonsense".

The Russian government initially issued categorical denials of any involvement in the U.S. presidential election. By June 2016, Kremlin spokesman Dmitry Peskov denied any connection of Russian government to the DNC hacks that had been blamed on Russia. At the Valdai Discussion Club forum in October 2016, Putin denounced American "hysteria" over alleged Russian interference.

When a new intelligence report surfaced in December 2016, Sergey Lavrov, Foreign Minister of Russia, rejected the accusations again. During a press conference, Putin deflected questions on the issue by accusing the U.S. Democratic Party of scapegoating Russia after losing the presidential election.

In June 2017, Putin said that "patriotically minded" Russian hackers could have been responsible for the cyberattacks against the U.S. during the 2016 campaign, while continuing to deny government involvement. Putin's comments echoed similar remarks that he had made earlier the same week to the French newspaper Le Figaro. A few days later he said, "Presidents come and go, and even the parties in power change, but the main political direction does not change. That's why, in the grand scheme of things, we don't care who's the head of the United States. We know more or less what is going to happen. And so in this regard, even if we wanted to, it wouldn't make sense for us to interfere." Putin also invoked whataboutism and criticized U.S. foreign policy, saying, "Put your finger anywhere on a map of the world, and everywhere you will hear complaints that American officials are interfering in internal electoral processes."

In March 2018 Putin suggested that "Ukrainians, Tatars, Jews, just with Russian citizenship" might have been to blame for interfering with U.S. elections, and suggested that "maybe it was the Americans who paid them for this work". Putin's statement was criticized by the Anti-Defamation League and the American Jewish Committee; both likened his comments to the Protocols of the Elders of Zion, an antisemitic hoax first published in Russia in the early 20th century. Boruch Gorin, a prominent rabbi in Moscow, said that the translation of Putin's comment into English lacked critical nuance and that Russian Jews were largely indifferent to it.

=== Columbia Journalism Review ===
In a 2023 4-part series in the Columbia Journalism Review, Jeff Gerth, Pulitzer Prize winning investigative reporter, reassessed the role of the press in reporting on Trump's role in the Russian interference and said the coverage "includes serious flaws." Multiple mainstream sources pushed back against Gerth's assertions, among them David Corn:

Gerth "missed the point" and bolstered "Trump's phony narrative...Ultimately Gerth does a disservice by failing to cast Russiagate accurately. Putin's attack succeeded, with help from Trump and his crew. That has always been the big story."

Others who criticized Gerth were Joe Conason, Jonathan Chait, Rachel Maddow, Cathy Young, Dan Kennedy, and Duncan Campbell.

== See also ==
- Attempts to overturn the 2020 United States presidential election
- Clinton plan intelligence conspiracy theory
- Federal prosecution of Donald Trump (classified documents case)
- Russia–United States relations
- Russian interference in the 2016 Brexit referendum
- Russian interference in the 2018 United States elections
- Russian interference in the 2020 United States elections
- Russian interference in the 2024 United States elections
- Russian involvement in regime change
- Social media in the 2016 United States presidential election
- Steele dossier#Kompromat and blackmail: Trump
- Timelines related to Donald Trump and Russian interference in United States elections
- Vulkan files leak
