= Senate Intelligence Committee report on Russian interference in the 2016 United States presidential election =

US report on Russian influence in US election

The redacted five-volume Senate Intelligence Committee report on Russian interference in the 2016 United States presidential election was released to the public on July 25, 2019. As a counterintelligence report, it went much further than the Mueller Report in its examination of Trump-related kompromat and blackmail risks.

The Senate Intelligence Committee report on Russian interference in the United States presidential election, officially titled Report of the Select Committee on Intelligence United States Senate on Russian Active Measures Campaigns and Interference in the 2016 U.S. Election, is the official report in five volumes documenting the findings and conclusions of the United States Senate Intelligence Committee concerning the Russian attack efforts against election infrastructure, Russia's use of social media to affect the election, the U.S. government's response to Russian activities, review of the Intelligence Community Assessment, and counterintelligence threats and vulnerabilities. The redacted report is 1,313 pages long. It is divided into five volumes.

The first volume of the report was released on July 25, 2019, and the fifth and last volume was released to the public on August 18, 2020. The Senate Intelligence Committee's investigation extended more than three years, includes interviews of more than 200 witnesses, and reviews more than one million documents. Marco Rubio, acting committee head, (Note: The committee had been led by Senator Richard Burr (R-NC), until he stepped down from the chair position when the FBI began a probe of his stock-trading activities.) said that "no probe into this matter has been more exhaustive.” On the stature of the report, the Senate Intelligence Committee said the report is "the most comprehensive description to date of Russia's activities and the threat they posed".

The Republican-led Senate Intelligence Committee submitted the first part of its five-volume report in July 2019 in which it concluded that the January 2017 Intelligence Community assessment alleging Russian interference was "coherent and well-constructed". The first volume also concluded that the assessment was "proper", learning from analysts that there was "no politically motivated pressure to reach specific conclusions". The final and fifth volume, which was the result of three years of investigations, was released on August 18, 2020, ending one of the United States "highest-profile congressional inquiries." The Committee report found that the Russian government had engaged in an "extensive campaign" to sabotage the election in favor of Donald Trump, which included assistance from some of Trump's own advisers.

Like the Mueller report that preceded it, the report does not find a criminal conspiracy between Russia and the Trump campaign, but it does go further than the Mueller report in detailing the many suspicious links between Trump associates and Russian officials. In particular, it describes Paul Manafort as "a grave counterintelligence threat". According to the report, "some evidence suggests" that Konstantin Kilimnik, to whom Manafort provided polling data, was directly connected to the Russian theft of Clinton-campaign emails. In addition, while Trump's written testimony in the Mueller report stated that he did not recall speaking with Roger Stone about WikiLeaks, the Senate report concludes that "Trump did, in fact, speak with Stone about WikiLeaks and with members of his Campaign about Stone's access to WikiLeaks on multiple occasions."

== Contents ==
The report was completely released on August 18, 2020, when the fifth volume was released. Much of the report is redacted, shown as .

=== Volume I: Russian Efforts Against Election Infrastructure ===
Volume I of the report is 67 pages long. In it, the committee describes "an unprecedented level of activity against state election infrastructure" by Russian intelligence in 2016. The activity occurred in "all 50 states" and is thought by "many officials and experts" to have been "a trial run ... to probe American defenses and identify weaknesses in the vast back-end apparatus—voter-registration operations, state and local election databases, electronic poll books and other equipment" of state election systems. The report warned that the United States "remains vulnerable" in the 2020 election.

Of "particular concern" to the committee report was the Russians' hacking of three companies "that provide states with the back-end systems that have increasingly replaced the thick binders of paper used to verify voters' identities and registration status."

However, while intelligence the Committee reviewed found that all 50 states probably had been targeted for scanning operations by Russian cyber actors to identify vulnerabilities in elections infrastructure, the Committee found no evidence that vote tallying procedures had been compromised or that any voting machines had been manipulated and instead found the conclusions of the declassified January 2017 Intelligence Community assessment on the interference credible. While the Committee found that voter registration databases in 2 states were accessed and saw some voter registration data exfiltrated before detection, the Committee found no evidence that any voter registration data had been modified or deleted. In testimony before the Committee, multiple U.S. Intelligence Community officials stated that multiple checks and redundancies within U.S. elections infrastructure and the decentralized nature of the elections system is beneficial to its cybersecurity and make it nearly impossible for interference with the elections infrastructure to occur without detection.

Nonetheless, U.S. Secretary of Homeland Security Jeh Johnson designated elections infrastructure as critical infrastructure in January 2017, and Congress appropriated $380 million to states to improve the cybersecurity of election administration under the Consolidated Appropriations Act, 2018 following a formula created under the Help America Vote Act. While the Committee concluded that Russian cyber activities demand renewed attention to vulnerabilities in elections infrastructure, the Committee also recommended that states remain firmly at the forefront of election administration and that the federal government should ensure that states receive the necessary resources and information related to cybersecurity threats (while a minority of the Committee members provided additional views that dissented from some of the recommendations of the first volume of the report).

=== Volume II: Russia’s Use of Social Media ===
Volume II of the report is 85 pages long.

Like the first volume of the report issued by the Special Counsel investigation into the interference, the joint press statement issued by the Department of Homeland Security and the Office of the Director of National Intelligence in October 2016, and the declassified Intelligence Community assessment released in January 2017, the second and fifth volumes of the report concluded that the Russian interference occurred primarily by hacking-and-dumping operations targeting the internal communications of the Democratic National Committee, the Democratic Congressional Campaign Committee, and Clinton campaign officials (specifically John Podesta) and active measures social media campaigns (particularly on Facebook and Twitter) to influence the electorate to vote for Donald Trump over Hillary Clinton in the general election.

The second volume of the report notes that the active measures social media campaign also attempted to influence voters to vote for Bernie Sanders over Hillary Clinton in the Democratic primary elections, for Donald Trump over Jeb Bush, Ted Cruz, and Marco Rubio in the Republican primary elections, Jill Stein as well as Donald Trump over Hillary Clinton in the general election, and targeted the consideration of Mitt Romney to serve as U.S. Secretary of State in the Trump administration with an opposition campaign during the Trump transition.

Other platforms identified by the second volume of the report as being used for Russian active measures on social media included Instagram, YouTube, Google+, Google Search, Gmail, Google Ads, Google Voice, Reddit, Tumblr, and LinkedIn, while other platforms were used as well. While the second volume of the report cites a 2016 study published by the NATO Strategic Communications Center of Excellence that found that entities supported by the Russian government have employed paid online trolls to post misleading information on Wikipedia in the context of the Russo-Ukrainian War, the report did not identify Wikipedia as one of the Web 2.0 services used by the Russian government to influence voters in the 2016 presidential election.

Subsequent declassified Intelligence Community assessments and press statements released discussing Russian interference in the 2018 elections, the 2020 elections, and the 2022 elections have likewise concluded or stated that the interference occurred primarily by active measures social media influence campaigns and not by cyberattacks on U.S. elections infrastructure—including by spreading disinformation about the security of the elections infrastructure itself to undermine confidence in U.S. election processes and in democracy in the United States by the American public. (Note: Similarly, a report prepared for the U.S. Senate Foreign Relations Committee released in January 2018 detailed allegations of Russian government interference in the 2016 United Kingdom European Union membership referendum including by active measures on social media, while the Intelligence and Security Committee of Parliament released a report in July 2020 that likewise noted that open source studies have concluded that Russian interference occurred in the referendum including by active measures on social media.) (Note: The Intelligence and Security Committee report also notes that open source studies have concluded that a Russian influence campaign occurred in the 2014 Scottish independence referendum, and both the Intelligence and Security Committee report and the Senate Foreign Relations Committee report both detail the hack-and-leak operation alleged to have been conducted by the Russian government during the 2017 French presidential election.)

=== Volume III: U.S. Government Response to Russian Activities ===
Volume III of the report is 54 pages long, and focuses on how the US government, mainly DHS and the FBI, responded to Russian election-related cyber activity, especially how they worked (and often clashed) with states and local election authorities, and what reforms were recommended.

It describes a slow, uneven federal response from mid-2016 through 2018: early actions treated the threat like a routine cyber incident, then escalated outreach as the scale became clearer. A major flashpoint was DHS’s decision (announced after the election, in January 2017) to designate election systems as “critical infrastructure”—intended to unlock support and coordination, but received by many states as a feared step towards federal control. States also reported that initial federal warnings in 2016 were confusing, poorly targeted, and lacked context (often going to IT staff rather than election officials), creating a “trust deficit,” worsened by some states learning key details via the media or later hearings. Over time, that relationship improved: by 2018 more states began using DHS services like cyber hygiene scanning and onsite risk/vulnerability assessments, with substantial uptake of persistent monitoring.

The recommendations are largely about rebuilding a functional federal–state partnership while hardening election systems: keep states in charge but give them better resources; strengthen deterrence by treating attacks on election infrastructure as hostile acts with a range of response options; improve two-way intelligence and information sharing (including security clearances for relevant state/local officials); secure voter registration databases with basics like audits, MFA, monitoring, and backups (including paper); and secure voting itself by replacing vulnerable machines, prioritising paper ballots/optical scanners or at least voter-verified paper trails, and adopting statistically sound audits such as risk-limiting audits. It notes federal funding support (including a 2018 grant appropriation) but implies more may be required.

=== Volume IV: Review of the Intelligence Community Assessment ===
Volume IV of the report is 158 pages long.

The volume evaluates the tradecraft, analytical quality, and conclusions of the U.S. Intelligence Community Assessment (ICA) released in January 2017, and reviews the intelligence reporting that supported the ICA’s key judgements. The Committee examined the underlying reporting used to produce the ICA to assess whether the assessment’s findings about Russian cyber activity, access to election-related systems, and intent were supported by credible intelligence.

Cross-references elsewhere in the Committee’s report indicate that the Committee broadly supported the ICA’s conclusions. The Committee stated that it concurred with the assessment and characterised the reporting underpinning the ICA as credible, indicating agreement with the ICA’s principal analytic judgements.

A major focus of the ICA reviewed in Volume IV was Russian access to election infrastructure. The ICA assessed that Russian intelligence obtained and maintained access to elements of multiple state or local electoral boards, while also concluding that the systems targeted or compromised were not involved in vote tallying. The Committee’s review validated this conclusion, noting that while Russian-affiliated cyber actors breached systems in two states and exfiltrated voter data, there was no evidence that vote-tallying systems were manipulated.

Volume IV also reviewed the ICA’s assessment of Russian intentions. The ICA judged that Moscow’s activities likely sought to undermine confidence in U.S. democratic processes and the integrity of elections, including preparation for public messaging that could challenge the legitimacy of results. The ICA cited indications that Russian diplomats were prepared to question the validity of the outcome publicly and that pro-Kremlin online actors had prepared a “DemocracyRIP” Twitter campaign in anticipation of a particular election result.

In the report’s “Minority Views” section, Senator Ron Wyden criticised the confidence levels attached to aspects of the ICA’s conclusions regarding vote manipulation. Wyden highlighted that the Department of Homeland Security’s assessment—referenced in the ICA and stating that vote-tallying systems were not compromised—was expressed with only moderate confidence. He argued that the strength of such an assessment depended on the completeness of the observations available, and noted that DHS had not conducted forensic analysis of voting machines that would definitively support the ICA’s conclusion.

=== Volume V: Counterintelligence Threats and Vulnerabilities ===
Volume V of the report, with 966 pages, was released to the public on August 18, 2020, albeit heavily redacted. The report concluded that "the Russian government engaged in an aggressive, multi-faceted effort to influence, or attempt to influence, the outcome of the 2016 presidential election". The report investigated "many aspects of the counterintelligence threat posed by the Russian influence operation", which targeted both the Trump campaign and the election.

==== Findings on the hack and leak of Democratic Party material ====
The Senate Intelligence Committee concluded that Russian president Vladimir Putin had ordered the 2016 Democratic National Committee cyber attacks and the subsequent leaks of stolen material damaging to Hillary Clinton's presidential campaign.

The committee wrote that Trump's presidential campaign "sought to maximize the impact of those leaks to aid Trump's electoral prospects". The Trump campaign "created messaging strategies to promote and share" the material, and "encouraged further leaks". The Trump campaign tasked Trump associate Roger Stone to gather information about WikiLeaks' release of the material; Stone reported to Trump and senior campaign members.

==== Findings on Paul Manafort and Konstantin Kilimnik ====
The Senate Intelligence Committee assessed that Trump campaign chairman Paul Manafort's "high-level access and willingness to share information with individuals closely affiliated with the Russian intelligence services" was a "grave counterintelligence threat". The foremost individual was Manafort's employee Konstantin Kilimnik, a Russian. The committee identified Kilimnik as a "Russian intelligence officer"; describing that Manafort and Kilimnik had a "close and lasting relationship" even through the 2016 election. Manafort repeatedly tried to "secretly share internal Campaign information with Kilimnik", including "sensitive internal polling data or Campaign strategy".

The Senate Intelligence Committee introduced a new allegation regarding Kilimnik, that he "may have been connected" to the Russian military intelligence's hack and leak of Democratic Party material. However, the report's discussions on this topic are redacted. Manafort's connection with the Russian hack and leak operation is "largely unknown", but possible, given "two pieces of information" the committee found; the details of such information were also redacted.

==== Findings on the Transition ====
The Transition section of the report mentions that "Russia took advantage of members of the Transition Team's relative inexperience in government, opposition to Obama Administration policies, and Trump's desire to deepen ties with Russia to pursue unofficial channels through which Russia could conduct diplomacy."

==== Background on Page and Limitations on the Committee's Investigation ====
The Inspector General of the Department of Justice found serious FBI errors in the application for surveillance on Carter Page, a former Trump campaign aide, while concluding that Page's travels in Russia and his past connections with Russian intelligence officers justified the FBI's concerns. Despite Page producing electronic documents and sitting for an interview that lasted six and a half hours, "The Committee had significant challenges in its attempt to understand Page's activities, including his role as a foreign policy adviser to the Trump Campaign."

==== The Steele Dossier: Its Origins and Handling ====
The report notes that the Steele dossier, a private intelligence report written by Christopher Steele, alleging a "well-developed conspiracy of co-operation" between the Trump campaign and the Russian government, "found that the tradecraft reflected in the dossier is generally poor relative to IC standards; the Department of Justice (DOJ) Office of the Inspector General (OIG) and many who the Committee spoke with at the FBI also found serious fault with Steele's tradecraft."

==== Republican and Democratic "additional views" and disagreements ====
The Senators' conclusions were sharply divided along party lines as to the degree of involvement by the Trump campaign and "whether to absolve or condemn the Trump campaign".

The New York Times wrote:

"The special counsel, Robert S. Mueller III, found insufficient evidence to accuse anyone associated with the Trump campaign of engaging in a criminal conspiracy with Russian intelligence officials conducting interference operations. But Mr. Mueller left unanswered the murkier question of what constitutes cooperation or collusion outside the context of a criminal violation. While the Senate report established broad bipartisan agreement about what happened in 2016, Democrats and Republicans could not agree whether those facts added up to collusion between the Trump campaign and the Russian government."

===== "Additional Views": Republicans =====
Senators Risch, Rubio, Blunt, Cotton, Cornyn, and Sasse stated:

"The committee found no evidence that then-candidate Donald Trump or his campaign colluded with the Russian government in its efforts to meddle in the election... After more than three years of investigation by this Committee, we can now say with no doubt, there was no collusion."

Some Republican Senators wanted to "state more explicitly that Trump's campaign did not coordinate with Russia. They say that while the report shows the Russian government 'inappropriately meddled' in the election, 'then-candidate Trump was not complicit.'"

While the other GOP Senators signed the GOP "Additional Views" statement, Richard Burr, "the chairman who led the investigation", and Susan Collins did not sign it.

===== "Additional Views": Democrats =====
Senators Heinrich, Feinstein, Wyden, Harris, and Bennet stated:

"The Committee's bipartisan Report unambiguously shows that members of the Trump Campaign cooperated with Russian efforts to get Trump elected."
"It is our conclusion, based on the facts detailed in the Committee's Report, that the Russian intelligence services' assault on the integrity of the 2016 U.S. electoral process[,] and Trump and his associates' participation in and enabling of this Russian activity, represents one of the single most grave counterintelligence threats to American national security in the modern era."

== Comparison to Mueller investigation ==
The Democratic senators described significant differences between the Mueller investigation and the Committee's report:

"While Mueller's was a criminal probe, the Senate investigation was a counterintelligence effort with the aim of ensuring that such interference wouldn't happen again."

The Senators wrote:

"There is also important additional context that should be provided to the reader regarding what the Committee's Report is, and what it is not. The Committee's Report does not duplicate the Special Counsel's investigation. The Special Counsel's work was criminal in nature, not a counterintelligence investigation. Counterintelligence investigations address intelligence questions pertaining to national security threats, not merely statutorily prohibited crimes. That is why the Committee pursued its investigation from a counterintelligence, perspective. And it is why the Special Counsel's inability to 'establish' a criminal conspiracy between the Trump Campaign and Russia does not convey the breadth and complexity of the threat presented by their actions."

== Reactions ==
=== Trump Administration ===
President Donald Trump, when asked about the report on August 18, 2020, said he "didn't read it". In July 2025, Director of National Intelligence Tulsi Gabbard alleged that the intelligence community's 2017 assessment on Russian interference was part of a "treasonous conspiracy" by the Obama administration to undermine Trump. She declassified a 2020 House Republican report that challenged the conclusion that Russia sought to help Trump win, and referred the matter to the Department of Justice for potential prosecution of Obama-era officials.

=== Intelligence officials ===
Former CIA official Susan Miller, who led the team that produced the 2017 intelligence assessment, publicly rejected Gabbard's claims as false. In interviews with NBC News and NPR (July-August 2025), Miller stated: "The director of national intelligence and the White House are lying" and that "we definitely had the intel to show with high probability that the specific goal of the Russians was to get Trump elected." She emphasized that the assessment found no evidence of conspiracy between the Trump campaign and Russia, and that Trump was acknowledged as the lawful president.

=== Democrats ===
Senate Minority Leader Chuck Schumer responded to the fifth volume release by saying "Despite nearly four years of repeated warnings from America’s national security officials, President Trump has failed to protect America’s elections and even opened the door for Vladimir Putin to again attack our country in the same insidious way."

=== Russia ===
Russian state news service TASS responded to the release of the fifth volume on August 18, with a denial from Dmitry Peskov, a spokesperson for Russian president Vladimir Putin, saying "The Kremlin regrets that as the U.S. presidential elections in November 2020 approach, more and more reports of alleged attempts by Russia to interfere in the electoral process will appear," such statements "have nothing to do with the truth".

== See also ==
- Second Cold War
