= 2016 Democratic National Committee email leak =

Disclosure of internal messages among the national Democratic Party leadership in the US

- Date: July 22, 2016 (initial WikiLeaks publication)
- Location: Washington, D.C. (DNC Headquarters)
- Participants: Democratic National Committee staff; Debbie Wasserman Schultz; WikiLeaks
- Key Disclosures: 19,252 internal emails and 8,034 attachments leaked.; Correspondence showing DNC internal bias favoring Hillary Clinton over Bernie Sanders.; Core Catalyst: Spear-phishing operations by Russian military groups Fancy Bear and Cozy Bear to exfiltrate data and manipulate public discourse.

ODNI declassified assessment of "Russian activities and intentions in recent U.S. elections"

The 2016 Democratic National Committee email leak is a collection of Democratic National Committee (DNC) emails stolen by one or more hackers operating under the pseudonym "Guccifer 2.0" who are alleged to be Russian intelligence agency hackers, according to indictments carried out by the Mueller investigation. These emails were subsequently leaked by DCLeaks in June and July 2016 and by WikiLeaks on July 22, 2016, just before the 2016 Democratic National Convention. This collection included 19,252 emails and 8,034 attachments from the DNC, the governing body of the United States Democratic Party. The leak includes emails from seven key DNC staff members dating from January 2015 to May 2016. On November 6, 2016, WikiLeaks released a second batch of DNC emails, adding 8,263 emails to its collection. The emails and documents showed that the Democratic Party's national committee favored Hillary Clinton over her rival Bernie Sanders in the primaries. These releases caused significant harm to the Clinton campaign, and have been cited as a potential contributing factor to her loss in the general election against Donald Trump.

The leaks resulted in allegations of bias against Bernie Sanders's presidential campaign, in apparent contradiction with the DNC leadership's publicly stated neutrality, as several DNC operatives openly derided Sanders's campaign and discussed ways to advance Clinton's nomination. Later reveals included controversial DNC–Clinton agreements dated before the primary, regarding financial arrangements and control over policy and hiring decisions. The revelations prompted the resignation of DNC chair Debbie Wasserman Schultz before the 2016 Democratic National Convention. The DNC issued a formal apology to Bernie Sanders and his supporters "for the inexcusable remarks made over email" that did not reflect the DNC's "steadfast commitment to neutrality during the nominating process". After the convention, DNC CEO Amy Dacey, CFO Brad Marshall, and Communications Director Luis Miranda also resigned in the wake of the controversy.

On December 9, 2016, the CIA told U.S. legislators that the U.S. Intelligence Community concluded Russia conducted operations during the 2016 U.S. election to prevent Hillary Clinton from winning the presidency. Multiple U.S intelligence agencies concluded people with direct ties to the Kremlin gave WikiLeaks hacked emails from the Democratic National Committee. WikiLeaks did not reveal its source. Later Julian Assange, founder of Wikileaks, claimed that the source of the emails was not Russia or any other state. On July 13, 2018, Special Counsel Robert Mueller indicted 12 Russian military intelligence agents of a group known as Fancy Bear alleged to be responsible for the attack, who were behind the Guccifer 2.0 pseudonym which claimed responsibility.

== Contents of leak ==
The emails leaked by Wikileaks, in two phases (the first on July 22, 2016 and the second on November 6, 2016), revealed information about the DNC's interactions with the media, Hillary Clinton's and Bernie Sanders's campaigns, and financial contributions. It also includes personal information about the donors of the Democratic Party, including credit card and Social Security numbers, which could facilitate identity theft. Earlier, in late June 2016, Guccifer 2.0 instructed reporters to visit the DCLeaks website for emails stolen from Democrats. With the WikiLeaks disclosure of additional stolen emails beginning on July 22, 2016, more than 150,000 stolen emails from either personal Gmail addresses or via the DNC that were related to the Hillary Clinton 2016 presidential campaign were published on the DCLeaks and WikiLeaks websites. On August 12, 2016, DCLeaks released information about more than 200 Democratic lawmakers, including their personal cellphone numbers. The numerous prank calls that Hillary Clinton received from this disclosure along with the loss of her campaign's email security severely disrupted her campaign, which changed its contact information on October 7, 2016 by calling each of her contacts one at a time.

=== Media ===
The emails include DNC staff's "off-the-record" correspondence with media personalities, including reporters at CNN, Politico, The Wall Street Journal, and The Washington Post.

=== Bernie Sanders's campaign ===
In the emails, DNC staffers derided the Sanders campaign. The Washington Post reported: "Many of the most damaging emails suggest the committee was actively trying to undermine Bernie Sanders's presidential campaign."

In a May 2016 email chain, the DNC CFO Brad Marshall told the DNC chief executive officer, Amy Dacey, that they should have someone from the media ask Sanders if he is an atheist prior to the West Virginia primary.

On May 21, 2016, DNC National Press Secretary Mark Paustenbach sent an email to DNC Spokesman Luis Miranda mentioning a controversy that ensued in December 2015, when the National Data Director of the Sanders campaign and three subordinate staffers accessed the Clinton campaign's voter information on the NGP VAN database. (The party accused Sanders's campaign of impropriety and briefly limited its access to the database. The Sanders campaign filed suit for breach of contract against the DNC, but dropped the suit on April 29, 2016.) Paustenbach suggested that the incident could be used to promote a "narrative for a story, which is that Bernie never had his act together, that his campaign was a mess." The DNC rejected this suggestion. The Washington Post wrote: "Paustenbach's suggestion, in that way, could be read as a defense of the committee rather than pushing negative information about Sanders. But this is still the committee pushing negative information about one of its candidates."

=== Debbie Wasserman Schultz's emails ===
Following the Nevada Democratic convention, Debbie Wasserman Schultz wrote about Jeff Weaver, manager of Bernie Sanders's campaign: "Damn liar. Particularly scummy that he barely acknowledges the violent and threatening behavior that occurred." The email referred to a fight between supporters of Bernie Sanders and Hillary Clinton that had taken place on May 17 in Nevada. In another email, Wasserman Schultz said of Bernie Sanders, "He isn't going to be president." Other emails showed her stating that Sanders doesn't understand the Democratic Party.

In May 2016, MSNBC's Mika Brzezinski accused the DNC of bias against the Sanders campaign and called on Wasserman Schultz to step down. Wasserman Schultz was upset at the negative media coverage of her actions, and she emailed the political director of NBC News, Chuck Todd, that such coverage of her "must stop". Describing the coverage as the "LAST straw", she ordered the DNC's communications director to call MSNBC president Phil Griffin to demand an apology from Brzezinski.

=== Financial and donor information ===
According to The New York Times, the cache included "thousands of emails exchanged by Democratic officials and party fund-raisers, revealing in rarely seen detail the elaborate, ingratiating and often bluntly transactional exchanges necessary to harvest hundreds of millions of dollars from the party's wealthy donor class. The emails capture a world where seating charts are arranged with dollar totals in mind, where a White House celebration of gay pride is a thinly disguised occasion for rewarding wealthy donors and where physical proximity to the president is the most precious of currencies." As is common in national politics, large party donors "were the subject of entire dossiers, as fund-raisers tried to gauge their interests, annoyances and passions".

In a series of email exchanges in April and May 2016, DNC fundraising staff discussed and compiled a list of people (mainly donors) who might be appointed to federal boards and commissions. OpenSecrets senior fellow Bob Biersack noted that this is a longstanding practice in the United States: "Big donors have always risen to the top of lists for appointment to plum ambassadorships and other boards and commissions around the federal landscape." The White House denied that financial support for the party was connected to board appointments, saying: "Being a donor does not get you a role in this administration, nor does it preclude you from getting one. We've said this for many years now and there's nothing in the emails that have been released that contradicts that."

=== France ===
In 2011, France, under President Nicolas Sarkozy, led calls for international intervention in the Libyan Civil War, voted in favor of United Nations Security Council Resolution 1973 and, subsequently, dispatched the French Air Force into direct military action in Libya in support of the National Transitional Council. At the time, France said the move was to protect Libyan civilians. But in a private email from Sidney Blumenthal to Hillary Clinton – revealed as part of the 2016 Democratic National Committee email leak – Blumenthal claimed France was more concerned with Libya's large gold reserves, which might pose a threat to the value of the Central African Franc, thereby weakening French influence in Africa, and that Sarkozy was interested in increased access to Libyan oil. Former French diplomat Patrick Haimzadeh described Blumenthal's analysis as reflecting a popular theory on conspiracy theory websites, yet called the analysis "not credible" because "the timeline just doesn't add up" with Sarkozy's decision to intervene preceding knowledge of Gaddafi's plans. French investigative journalist Fabrice Arfi dismissed Blumenthal's claim as "far-fetched", while also acknowledging that even U.S. intelligence did not find France's publicly stated motivations for the Libya intervention to be entirely credible either.

== Perpetrators ==
=== Cybersecurity analysis ===
A self-styled hacker going by the moniker "Guccifer 2.0" claimed to be the source of the leaks; WikiLeaks did not reveal its source. When asked about Guccifer 2.0's leaks, WikiLeaks founder Julian Assange said, "These look very much like they're from the Russians. But in some ways, they look very amateur, and almost look too much like the Russians." Cybersecurity experts and firms, including CrowdStrike, Fidelis Cybersecurity, Mandiant, SecureWorks, and ThreatConnect, and the editor for Ars Technica, stated the leak was part of a series of cyberattacks on the DNC committed by two Russian intelligence groups. U.S. intelligence agencies also stated (with "high confidence") that the Russian government was behind the theft of emails and documents from the DNC, according to reports in The New York Times and The Washington Post.

WikiLeaks founder Julian Assange initially stuck to WikiLeaks policy of neither confirming nor denying sources but in January 2017 said that their "source is not the Russian government and it is not a state party," and the Russian government said it had no involvement.

Comey testified that the FBI requested, but did not receive, physical access to the DNC servers. According to Comey, the FBI did obtain copies of the servers and all the information on them, as well as access to forensics from CrowdStrike, a third-party cybersecurity company that reviewed the DNC servers. Comey said that access through Crowdstrike was an "appropriate substitute" and called the firm a "highly respected private company".

=== Guccifer 2.0 submission to WikiLeaks ===
A week after Guccifer 2.0 appeared online, WikiLeaks sent the persona a message saying to "send any new material here for us to review and it will have a much higher impact than what you are doing". After not receiving a reply, on July 26, 2016 WikiLeaks sent another message that said "if you have anything hillary related we want it in the next tweo [sic] days prefable [sic] because the DNC is approaching and she will solidify bernie supporters behind her after." Guccifer 2.0 responded "ok ... i see," and WikiLeaks added "we think trump has only a 25% chance of winning against hillary ... so conflict between bernie and hillary is interesting." On July 14, 2016 Guccifer 2.0 sent WikiLeaks an email with an encrypted attachment labeled "wk dnc link1.txt.gpg." According to the indictment, the email explained that "the encrypted file contained instructions on how to access an online archive of stolen DNC documents."

Four days later, WikiLeaks responded that it had received "the 1Gb or so archive" and would release the files that week. The DNC emails were released several days later.

=== United States intelligence conclusions ===
On October 7, 2016, the United States Department of Homeland Security and the Office of the Director of National Intelligence stated that the US intelligence community was "confident" that the Russian government directed the breaches and the release of the obtained or allegedly obtained material in an attempt to "... interfere with the US election process."

The U.S. Intelligence Community tasked resources debating why Putin chose summer 2016 to escalate active measures influencing U.S. politics. Director of National Intelligence James R. Clapper said after the 2011–13 Russian protests, Putin's confidence in his viability as a politician was damaged, and Putin responded with the propaganda operation. Former CIA officer Patrick Skinner explained the goal was to spread uncertainty. U.S. Congressman Adam Schiff, Ranking Member of the House Permanent Select Committee on Intelligence, commented on Putin's aims, and said U.S. intelligence agencies were concerned with Russian propaganda. Speaking about disinformation that appeared in Hungary, Slovakia, the Czech Republic, and Poland, Schiff said there was an increase of the same behavior in the U.S. Schiff concluded Russian propaganda operations would continue against the U.S. after the election.

On December 9, 2016, the CIA told U.S. legislators the U.S. Intelligence Community concluded Russia conducted operations during the 2016 U.S. election to assist Donald Trump in winning the presidency. Multiple U.S. intelligence agencies concluded people with direct ties to the Kremlin gave WikiLeaks hacked emails from the DNC and additional sources such as John Podesta, campaign chairman for Hillary Clinton. These intelligence organizations additionally concluded Russia attempted to hack the Republican National Committee (RNC) as well as the DNC but were prevented by security defenses on the RNC network.

In December 2016, the CIA said the foreign intelligence agents were Russian operatives previously known to the U.S. CIA officials told U.S. Senators it was "quite clear" Russia's intentions were to help Trump. Trump released a statement December 9, and disregarded the CIA conclusions.

In June 2017, former Secretary of Homeland Security Jeh Johnson, who was appointed by and served under President Barack Obama, testified before a House Select committee that his department offered their assistance to the DNC during the campaign to determine what happened to their server, but said his efforts were "rebuffed" because the Department of Homeland Security was offering to provide assistance months after the FBI had provided assistance.

Throughout late 2017 into early 2018, numerous individuals gave testimonies to the House Permanent Select Committee on Intelligence (HPSCI) who were charged with carrying out an investigation into the series of cyberattacks.

=== Steele dossier allegations ===
The Steele dossier, a controversial and unfinished political opposition research report published in January 2017 without the author's permission, included several allegations relating to the hacking and leaking of the emails. The individuals named have denied the allegations. Some allegations have been publicly confirmed, however the intelligence community and most experts have treated the dossier with caution due to its unverified allegations.

== Reactions ==
On July 18, 2016, Dmitry Peskov, press secretary for Russian president Vladimir Putin, stated that the Russian government had no involvement in the DNC hacking incident. Peskov called it "paranoid" and "absurd", saying: "We are again seeing these maniacal attempts to exploit the Russian theme in the US election campaign." That position was later reiterated by the Russian Embassy in Washington, DC, which called the allegation "entirely unrealistic".

Then-Republican nominee Donald Trump said on Twitter: "Leaked e-mails of DNC show plans to destroy Bernie Sanders. Mock his heritage and much more. On-line from Wikileakes [sic], really vicious. RIGGED."

The leak fueled tensions going into the 2016 Democratic National Convention: although DNC operatives initially denied accusations of bias, Sanders operatives and multiple media commentators cited the leaks as clear evidence that the DNC had been favoring Clinton and undermining Sanders. Several media commentators have disputed the significance of the emails, arguing that the DNC's internal preference for Clinton was not historically unusual and was unlikely to have swayed the final outcome of the primary; whereas many of Sanders's supporters viewed the revelations as symptomatic of an entrenched, unethical political establishment.

On July 24, 2016, Sanders urged Wasserman Schultz to resign following the leak and stated that he was "disappointed" by the leak, but that he was "not shocked". Jeff Weaver, Bernie Sanders's campaign manager, called for greater accountability in the DNC, calling Wasserman Schultz "a figure of disunity" within the Democratic Party. Later the same day, Wasserman Schultz resigned from her position as DNC Chairman, effective as of the end of the nominating convention. After Wasserman Schultz resigned, Sanders said that she had "made the right decision for the future of the Democratic Party." On the following day, the DNC apologized to Bernie Sanders and his supporters, stating, "On behalf of everyone at the DNC, we want to offer a deep and sincere apology to Senator Sanders, his supporters, and the entire Democratic Party for the inexcusable remarks made over email," and that the emails did not reflect the DNC's "steadfast commitment to neutrality during the nominating process". On July 24, 2016, in an interview with NPR, former DNC Chair and former Governor of Virginia Terry McAuliffe said "... that the chair's job should be "to remain neutral". "I sat in that chair in 2004 trying to navigate all the different candidates we had. But if you had people in there who were trashing one of the candidates, I can tell you this, if I were still chairman they wouldn't be working there. I mean, that is just totally unacceptable behavior."

On July 25, 2016, Anthony Zurcher, North America reporter for the BBC, commented that "the revelation that those in the heart of the Democratic establishment sought to undermine the anti-establishment Sanders is roughly on a par with [Casablanca character] police Capt Renault's professed shock that gambling was taking place in the Casablanca club he was raiding, as a waiter hands him his winnings."

On July 25, 2016, Republican National Committee chairman Reince Priebus said that "Today's events show really what an uphill climb the Democrats are facing this week in unifying their party. Starting out the week by losing your party chairman over longstanding bitterness between factions is no way to keep something together."

After the emails were released, the Australian diplomat Alexander Downer informed the U.S. government that, in May 2016 at a London wine bar, Trump campaign staffer George Papadopoulos had told him that the Russian government had a large trove of Hillary Clinton emails that could potentially damage her presidential campaign. The FBI started a counterintelligence investigation into possible Russian interference in the 2016 U.S. presidential election.

On October 14, 2016, NBC News reported that multiple sources were telling them that Barack Obama had ordered the CIA to present him with options for a retaliatory cyber attack against the Russian Federation for allegedly interfering in the US presidential election. Sources said that this is not the first time the CIA has presented such options to a president, but that on all previous occasions the decision was made not to carry out the proposed attacks.

== Media coverage and public perception ==
On July 27, 2016, The New York Times reported that Julian Assange, in an interview on British ITV on June 12, 2016, had "made it clear that he hoped to harm Hillary Clinton's chances of winning the presidency," and that in a later interview on the program Democracy Now! on July 25, 2016, the first day of the Democratic National Convention, he acknowledged that "he had timed their release to coincide with the Democratic convention." In an interview with CNN, Assange would neither confirm nor deny who WikiLeaks' sources were; he claimed that his website "... might release 'a lot more material' relevant to the US electoral campaign ..."

Following the publication of the stolen emails, NSA whistleblower Edward Snowden criticized WikiLeaks for its wholesale leakage of data, writing that "their hostility to even modest curation is a mistake". The Washington Post contrasted the difference between WikiLeaks' practices and Snowden's disclosure of information about NSA: while Snowden worked with journalists to vet documents (withholding some, where it would endanger national security), WikiLeaks' "more radical" approach involves the dumping of "massive, searchable caches online with few—if any—apparent efforts to remove sensitive personal information."

On July 25, 2016, Anne Applebaum, columnist for The Washington Post, wrote that:

... with the exception of a few people on Twitter and a handful of print journalists, most of those covering this story, especially on television, are not interested in the nature of the hackers, and they are not asking why the Russians apparently chose to pass the emails on to WikiLeaks at this particular moment, on the eve of the Democratic National Convention. They are focusing instead on the content of what were meant to be private emails ...

She went on to describe in detail other Russian destabilization campaigns in Eastern European countries.

On July 25, 2016, Thomas Rid, Professor in Security Studies at King's College, London, and non-resident fellow at the School for Advanced International Studies, Johns Hopkins University, in Washington, DC, summed up the evidence pointing to Russia being behind the hacking of the DNC files and the "Guccifer-branded leaking operation." He concluded that these actions successfully blunted the "DNC's ability to use its opposition research in surprise against Trump ..." He further writes that data exfiltration from political organizations is done by many countries and is considered to be a legitimate form of intelligence work. "But digitally exfiltrating and then publishing possibly manipulated documents disguised as freewheeling hacktivism is crossing a big red line and setting a dangerous precedent: an authoritarian country directly yet covertly trying to sabotage an American election."

Russian security expert and investigative journalist Andrei Soldatov said, "It is almost impossible to know for sure whether or not Russia is behind a hack of the DNC's servers." According to him, one of the reasons Russia would try to sway the US presidential election is that the Russian government considers Clinton "a hater of Russia": "There is this mentality in Russia of being besieged; that it is always under attack from the United States. ... They are trying to interfere in our internal affairs so why not try to do the same thing to them?"

== Civil DNC lawsuit ==
On April 20, 2018, the Democratic National Committee filed a civil lawsuit in federal court in New York, accusing the Russian government, the Trump campaign, Wikileaks, and others of conspiracy to alter the course of the 2016 presidential election and asking for monetary damages and a declaration admitting guilt. A hearing on the defendants' motions to dismiss was scheduled for May 17, 2018. In July 2019, the suit was dismissed with prejudice. In his judgement, federal judge John Koeltl said that although he believed the Russian government was involved in the hacking, US federal law generally prohibited suits against foreign governments. The judge said the other defendants "did not participate in any wrongdoing in obtaining the materials in the first place" and were therefore within the law in publishing the information. He also said that the DNC's argument was "entirely divorced from the facts" and even if the Russians had directly provided the hacked documents to the Trump team, it would not be criminal for the campaign to publish those documents, as long as they did not contribute to the hacking itself. Koeltl denied the defendants motion for sanctions, but dismissed the suit with prejudice, meaning it had a substantive legal defect and could not be refiled.

== See also ==
- Clinton plan intelligence conspiracy theory
- Democratic National Committee cyber attacks
- Murder of Seth Rich
- The Plot to Hack America
- Podesta emails
- Russian interference in the 2016 United States elections
