= Amy Dacey =

American politician

Amy Dacey is an American Democratic politician. She was the CEO of the Democratic National Committee from January 2014 until her resignation in August 2016. She currently serves as Executive Director of the Sine Institute of Policy & Politics at American University.

== Early years and education ==
Amy Dacey graduated from Auburn High School in Cayuga County, New York, in 1989. She received her BA in Political Science and History from Binghamton University in 1993, and an MA in Political Science from American University.

== Career ==
Dacey began her career at the National Foundation of Women Legislators. During the 2000 election cycle she was the Deputy Political Director of the Democratic Congressional Campaign Committee. She then served as the Deputy Political Director on the Democratic Senatorial Committee for the 2002 election cycle; the National Political Director of Keeping America’s Promise, a political action committee affiliated with Democrat John Kerry; the Director of Government Relations at the Service Employees International Union (SEIU); and in 2004 Dacey worked as the special assistant to John Kerry during his 2004 presidential campaign. During the campaign Dacey acted as the Traveling Political Director. During the 2006 election year she worked as the National Political Director for Senator John Kerry’s national leadership PAC. In 2010 Dacey took the job of Executive Director at EMILY's List, an American political action committee that works to elect female Democrats. In 2016, she served as Chief Executive Officer of the Democratic National Committee during President Obama's presidential election.

She has worked on the political campaigns of Louise Slaughter and Maurice Hinchey.

=== Democratic National Committee ===
DNC Chairwoman Debbie Wasserman Schultz appointed Dacey as CEO of the DNC in October 2013, and began her work for the DNC in January 2014.

In one of the DNC emails in 2016, Dacey responded "AMEN" to an email from colleague Bradley Marshall, in which Marshall expressed the belief that Bernie Sanders "is an atheist" (rather than a Jew) and that this could be used as a political issue against him in the Kentucky and West Virginia primaries. Dacey subsequently resigned as CEO of the DNC after the email was published.

== Awards and recognition ==
In 2014, Dacey was inducted into the Auburn Education Foundation's Hall of Distinction. In March 2014, Dacey was the headline speaker at the Democratic Women of Cayuga County’s annual spring brunch in Auburn, New York.

== See also ==
- Democratic Congressional Campaign Committee cyber attacks
- 2016 Democratic National Committee email leak
