= Democratic Congressional Campaign Committee cyber attacks =

Espionage in the United States by Russian hackers

On Friday July 29, 2016 the Democratic Congressional Campaign Committee reported that its computer systems had been infiltrated. It is strongly believed by US intelligence sources that the infiltrator groups are Russian foreign intelligence groups that breached the Democratic National Committee's computer systems. These groups are known as Fancy Bear and Cozy Bear (or "Sofacy").

CrowdStrike assisted with efforts to deal with the DCCC breach. There was significant concern that the Russian Government was attempting to influence the 2016 Presidential campaign. Russian cyber intrusions into United States government and private sector computer systems significantly increased after the U.S. imposed sanctions on Russia after its invasion of the Crimea in Ukraine. It was President Obama's preference to publicize cyber attacks.

== See also ==
- Cold War II
- Democratic National Committee cyber attacks
- Foreign electoral intervention
- Russian espionage in the United States
- Russian interference in the 2018 United States elections
- Social media in the 2016 United States presidential election
