= Podesta emails =

Emails published by WikiLeaks from John Podesta's personal account

In March 2016, the personal Gmail account of John Podesta, a former White House chief of staff and chair of Hillary Clinton's 2016 U.S. presidential campaign, was compromised in a data breach accomplished via a spear-phishing attack, and some of his emails, many of which were work-related, were hacked. Cybersecurity researchers as well as the United States government attributed responsibility for the breach to the Russian cyber spying group Fancy Bear, allegedly two units of a Russian military intelligence agency.

Some or all of the Podesta emails were subsequently obtained by WikiLeaks, which published over 20,000 pages of emails, allegedly from Podesta, in October and November 2016. Podesta and the Clinton campaign have declined to authenticate the emails. Cybersecurity experts interviewed by PolitiFact believe the majority of emails are probably unaltered, while stating it is possible that the hackers inserted at least some doctored or fabricated emails. The article then attests that the Clinton campaign, however, has yet to produce any evidence that any specific emails in the latest leak were fraudulent. A subsequent investigation by U.S. intelligence agencies also reported that the files obtained by WikiLeaks during the U.S. election contained no "evident forgeries".

Podesta's emails, once released by WikiLeaks, shed light on the inner workings of the Clinton campaign, suggested that CNN commentator Donna Brazile had shared audience questions with the Clinton campaign in advance of town hall meetings, and contained excerpts from Hillary Clinton's speeches to Wall Street firms. Proponents of the Pizzagate conspiracy theory claim the emails contained coded messages which support their conspiracy theory.

== Data theft ==
ODNI declassified assessment of "Russian activities and intentions in recent U.S. elections"

Researchers from the Atlanta-based cybersecurity firm Dell SecureWorks reported that the emails had been obtained through a data theft carried out by the hacker group Fancy Bear, a group of Russian intelligence-linked hackers that were also responsible for cyberattacks that targeted the Democratic National Committee (DNC) and Democratic Congressional Campaign Committee (DCCC), resulting in WikiLeaks publishing emails from those hacks.

SecureWorks concluded Fancy Bear had sent Podesta an email on March 19, 2016, that had the appearance of a Google security alert, but actually contained a misleading link—a strategy known as spear-phishing. (This tactic has also been used by hackers to break into the accounts of other notable persons, such as Colin Powell.) The link—which used the URL shortening service Bitly—brought Podesta to a fake log-in page where he entered his Gmail credentials. The email was initially sent to the IT department as it was suspected of being a fake but was described as "legitimate" in an e-mail sent by a department employee, who later said he meant to write "illegitimate".

SecureWorks had tracked the activities of Fancy Bear for more than a year before the cyberattack, and in June 2016, had reported the group made use of malicious Bitly links and fake Google login pages to trick targets into divulging their passwords. However, the hackers left some of their Bitly accounts public, allowing SecureWorks to trace many of their links to e-mail accounts targeted with spear-phishing attacks. Of this list of targeted accounts, more than one hundred were policy advisors to Clinton, or members of her presidential campaign, and by June, twenty staff members had clicked on the phishing links.

On December 9, 2016, the Central Intelligence Agency (CIA) told U.S. legislators that the U.S. Intelligence Community had reached the conclusion that the Russian government was behind the hack and had given to WikiLeaks a collection of hacked emails from John Podesta.

=== DCLeaks submission to WikiLeaks ===
On September 15, 2016, the DCLeaks Twitter account sent WikiLeaks a DM about a possible submission, saying they had gotten no response on the secured chat. The WikiLeaks account responded "Hi there" without further elaboration but did not receive a response. The same day, the Guccifer 2.0 Twitter account sent DCLeaks a DM saying that WikiLeaks was trying to contact them and to arrange to speak through encrypted email. Analysis of the metadata on the Podesta emails show a creation date of September 19, 2016. The Mueller Report concluded that this might have been when the emails were transferred to WikiLeaks.

== Authenticity ==
A declassified report by the CIA, Federal Bureau of Investigation (FBI), and National Security Agency (NSA) noted that, "Moscow most likely chose WikiLeaks because of its self-proclaimed reputation for authenticity. Disclosures through WikiLeaks did not contain any evident forgeries."

Cybersecurity experts interviewed by PolitiFact believe that while most of the emails are probably unaltered, it is possible the hackers inserted some doctored or fabricated material into the collection.

Jeffrey Carr, CEO of the cybersecurity company Taia Global, stated: "I've looked at a lot of document dumps provided by hacker groups over the years, and in almost every case you can find a few altered or entirely falsified documents. But only a few. The vast majority were genuine. I believe that's the case with the Podesta emails, as well." Jamie Winterton of the Arizona State University Global Security Initiative stated, "I would be shocked if the emails weren't altered," noting the longstanding Russian practice of promoting disinformation.

Cybersecurity expert Robert Graham described the contents of some of the emails as authentic by using the DomainKeys Identified Mail (DKIM) contained in these emails' signatures. However, not all of the emails have these keys in their signature, and thus could not be verified with this method.

== Publication ==
On October 7, 2016, 30 minutes after the Access Hollywood tape was first published, WikiLeaks began publishing thousands of emails from Podesta's Gmail account. Throughout October, WikiLeaks released installments of these emails on a daily basis. On December 18, 2016, John Podesta stated in Meet the Press that the FBI had contacted him about the leaked emails on October 9, 2016, but had not contacted him since.

On October 17, 2016, the government of Ecuador severed the internet connection of WikiLeaks founder Julian Assange at the Ecuadorian embassy in London. The Ecuadorian government stated that it had temporarily severed Assange's internet connection because of WikiLeaks' release of documents "impacting on the U.S. election campaign", although it also stated this was not meant to prevent WikiLeaks from operating. WikiLeaks continued releasing installments of the Podesta emails during this time.

== Contents ==
Some of the emails provide some insight into the inner workings of the Clinton campaign. For example, the emails show a discussion among campaign manager Robby Mook and top aides about possible campaign themes and slogans. Other emails revealed insights about the internal conflicts of the Clinton Foundation. The BBC published an article detailing 18 "revelations" revealed from their initial review of the leaked emails, including excerpts from Clinton's speeches and politically motivated payments to the Clinton Foundation.

One of the emails released on October 12, 2016, included Podesta's iCloud account password. His iCloud account was hacked, and his Twitter account was then briefly compromised. Some were emails that Barack Obama and Podesta exchanged in 2008.

=== Clinton's Wall Street speeches ===
WikiLeaks published transcripts of three Clinton speeches to Goldman Sachs and an 80-page internal campaign document cataloging potentially problematic portions of over 50 paid speeches. During the Democratic primary campaign, Bernie Sanders had criticized Hillary Clinton for refusing to release transcripts of speeches given to financial firms, portraying her as too close to Wall Street. Donald Trump first publicly called for the transcripts during a rally on October 3, 2016, four days before their publication by WikiLeaks: "I would like to see what the speeches said. She doesn't want to release them. Release the papers, Hillary, release those papers."

In the October 2016 presidential debate, Clinton voiced her support for a "no-fly" zone in Syria. In a 2013 speech, Clinton had discussed the difficulties involved. In particular, she noted that in order to establish a no-fly zone, Syria's air defenses would need to be destroyed. Because the Assad government had located these anti-aircraft batteries in populated civilian areas, their destruction would cause many collateral civilian deaths. Clinton's staff additionally flagged comments about regulation of Wall Street, as well as her relationship with the industry, as potentially problematic.

The excerpts came up in the two subsequent presidential debates between Clinton and Trump. In one of the debates, the moderator Martha Raddatz quoted an excerpt saying that politicians "need both a public and a private position" and asked Clinton if it was okay for politicians to be "two-faced". Clinton replied, "As I recall, that was something I said about Abraham Lincoln after having seen the wonderful Steven Spielberg movie called Lincoln. It was a master class watching president Lincoln get the Congress to approve the 13th amendment, it was principled and strategic. I was making the point that it is hard sometimes to get the Congress to do what you want to do." In the third presidential debate, the moderator Chris Wallace quoted a speech excerpt where Clinton says, "My dream is a hemispheric common market with open trade and open borders," and asked if she was for open borders. Clinton replied, "If you went on to read the rest of the sentence, I was talking about energy. We trade more energy with our neighbors than we trade with the rest of the world combined. And I do want us to have an electric grid, an energy system that crosses borders."

=== Discussions of Catholic religious activities ===
In 2012 Sandy Newman wrote to Podesta: "I have not thought at all about how one would 'plant the seeds of the revolution', or who would plant them." Podesta agreed that this was necessary to do as Newman suggested and wrote back to note that they had created groups like Catholics in Alliance for the Common Good and Catholics United to push for a more progressive approach to the faith, change would "have to be bottom up".

Raymond Arroyo responded: "It makes it seem like you're creating organizations to change the core beliefs of the church," he said. "For someone to come and say, 'I have a political organization to change your church to complete my political agenda or advance my agenda', I don't know how anybody could embrace that." Professor Robert P. George added that "these groups are political operations constructed to masquerade as organizations devoted to the Catholic faith".

The leak revealed an email sent by John Halpin, a senior fellow at the Center for American Progress. The email discussed conservative media mogul Rupert Murdoch's decision to raise his kids in the Catholic Church. He wrote, "Many of the most powerful elements of the conservative movement are all Catholic (many converts) ... It's an amazing bastardization of the faith. They must be attracted to the systematic thought and severely backwards gender relations and must be totally unaware of Christian democracy." Clinton communications director Jennifer Palmieri responded: "I imagine they think it is the most socially acceptable, politically conservative religion—their rich friends wouldn't understand if they became evangelical." Supporters and members of Donald Trump's campaign called the email exchange evidence of anti-Catholic sentiment in the Democratic Party. Halpin confirmed that he had written the email, though he contested claims that it was "anti-Catholic" and said that it was taken out of context and that he had sent the email to his Catholic colleagues "to make a fleeting point about perceived hypocrisy and the flaunting of one's faith by prominent conservative leaders."

=== Democratic Party primary debate questions shared with Clinton campaign by Donna Brazile ===
The WikiLeaks publication included emails showing that CNN contributor Donna Brazile shared questions with the Clinton campaign prior to debates during the DNC primaries.

On October 11, 2016, WikiLeaks released the text of an email sent by Donna Brazile on March 12, 2016, to Clinton communications director Jennifer Palmieri with the subject header "From time to time I get questions in advance." The email included a question about the death penalty. The following day Clinton received a similar question from the Townhall host, Roland Martin. Brazile initially denied coordinating with the Clinton campaign, and a CNN spokesperson said "CNN did not share any questions with Donna Brazile, or anyone else for that matter, prior to the town hall" and that "we have never, ever given a town hall question to anyone beforehand". According to CNNMoney, the debate's moderator Roland Martin did not deny that he shared questions with Brazile. In another leaked email, Brazile wrote: "One of the questions directed to HRC tomorrow is from a woman with a rash. Her family has lead poison and she will ask what, if anything, will Hillary do as president to help the ppl of Flint." At a debate in Flint the following day, a woman whose "son had developed a rash from the contaminated water" asked Clinton: "If elected president, what course will you take to regain my trust in government?" In a third email, Brazile added: "I'll send a few more."

CNN severed ties with Brazile on October 14, 2016. Brazile later said that CNN did not give her "the ability to defend myself" after the email release and referred to WikiLeaks as "WikiLies". Brazile repeatedly denied that she had received the question on the death penalty in advance and has said that the documents released by WikiLeaks were "altered". In an essay for Time written on March 17, 2017, Brazile wrote that the emails revealed that "among the many things I did in my role as a Democratic operative and D.N.C. Vice Chair [...] was to share potential town hall topics with the Clinton campaign." She wrote, "My job was to make all our Democratic candidates look good, and I worked closely with both campaigns to make that happen. But sending those emails was a mistake I will forever regret." Brazile resigned from CNN in October 2016 due to the revelations.

=== Saudi Arabia and Qatar ===
One leaked email from August 2014, addressed to Podesta, identifies Saudi Arabia and Qatar as providing "clandestine", "financial and logistic" aid to ISIS and other "radical Sunni groups". The email outlines a plan of action against ISIS, urges putting pressure on Saudi Arabia and Qatar to end their alleged support for the group. Whether the email was originally written by Hillary Clinton, her advisor Sidney Blumenthal, or another person is unclear.

== Reactions ==
The American public's interest in WikiLeaks in October roughly coincided with a tightening presidential race between Trump and Clinton. According to an analysis of opinion polling by Harry Enten of FiveThirtyEight, the release of the emails roughly matched Clinton's decline in the polls, though it did not seem to have an effect on public perceptions of her trustworthiness. Enten concluded that WikiLeaks' activities were "among the factors that might have contributed to [Clinton's] loss."

Sociology professor Zeynep Tufekci criticized how WikiLeaks handled the release of these emails, writing, "Taking one campaign manager's email account and releasing it with zero curation in the last month of an election needs to be treated as what it is: political sabotage, not whistle-blowing." In an op-ed for The Intercept, James Risen criticized the media for its reporting on emails, arguing that the hacking of the emails was a more significant story than the content of the emails themselves. Thomas Frank, writing in an editorial column for The Guardian, argued that the emails gave an "unprecedented view into the workings of the elite, and how it looks after itself".

Glen Caplin, a spokesman for the Clinton campaign, said, "By dribbling these out every day WikiLeaks is proving they are nothing but a propaganda arm of the Kremlin with a political agenda doing [Vladimir] Putin's dirty work to help elect Donald Trump." When asked to comment on the emails' release, president Vladimir Putin replied that Russia was being falsely accused. He said, "The hysteria is merely caused by the fact that somebody needs to divert the attention of the American people from the essence of what was exposed by the hackers."

== See also ==
- 2016 Democratic National Committee email leak
- Democratic National Committee cyber attacks
- October surprise
- Pizzagate conspiracy theory
- The Plot to Hack America
