= Dmitri Badin =

Russian intelligence officer and hacker

- Дмитрий Сергеевич Бадин
- Born: November 15, 1990 (age 35); Kursk, RSFSR, Soviet Union
- Occupations: Intelligence officer, hacker
- Employer: GRU

Dmitri Sergeyevich Badin (Russian: Дмитрий Сергеевич Бадин; born 15 November 1990) is a Russian intelligence officer and hacker. He is said to have penetrated computer systems of several governments and international organizations on behalf of the Russian state military intelligence service GRU. Badin is wanted by the US Federal Bureau of Investigation and the German federal prosecutor Generalbundesanwalt. He is suspected of being a member of the Sofacy Group.

== Biography ==
The FBI has been seeking Badin since 2018 by an international arrest warrant based on a suspicion that he is responsible for manipulating the 2016 US presidential election and attacking the servers of the international anti-doping agency WADA.

The German federal prosecutor obtained an international arrest warrant against him in early May 2020. He is said to be responsible for a hacker attack on the Bundestag in 2015. At least 16 gigabytes of data were captured, including from one of the offices of Chancellor Angela Merkel. The Sofacy Group ("Fancy Bear"), of which Badin is believed to be a member, is responsible for this attack. The allegations against Badin are based on secret service activities and the spying on data.

The international investigation platform Bellingcat confirmed Badin's birth dates and his work for unit 26165 of the GRU, which specializes in cryptography. His car was also registered at the Moscow address of GRU. The accounts he used on Skype, vk.com and his email address and telephone number also confirmed these assumptions. According to this, Badin is probably the author of malware that was used for the hacks of the MH-17 investigative team, the email server of the Democratic Party, the German Bundestag and Bellingcat itself.
