= Cribl.io =

American software company

- Type: Private
- Industry: Software
- Founded: July 2018; 8 years ago
- Founders: Clint Sharp, Dritan Bitincka, Ledion Bitincka
- Headquarters: San Francisco, California, U.S.
- Revenue: $200 million (2024)
- Number of employees: ≈ 1000 (2025)
- Website: cribl.io

Cribl.io is an American company developing a data platform for information technology and security operations teams. Their core function revolves around simplifying and managing the massive amount of data generated by various software systems within an organization. Founded in 2018 by Clint Sharp, Ledion Bitincka, and Dritan Bitincka, the company is headquartered in San Francisco, California. Its mascot is a goat named Ian.

== History ==
Cribl.io was established in San Francisco, California, in July 2018 by Clint Sharp, Ledion Bitincka, and Dritan Bitincka.

In February 2019, the company secured $4 million in seed funding; by October of the same year, it launched Cribl Stream 2.0. Cribl completed its Series A funding round in April 2020, securing $7.4 million, and its Series B funding round in October 2020, raising $35 million, led by Sequoia Capital. That same year, it launched Cribl.Cloud for onboarding data to SaaS logging tools, metric databases, and cloud data warehouses.

The company was listed among The Information 50 Most Promising Startups in 2020.

Cribl.io launched AppScope, an Apache-licensed, open-source, black-box instrumentation technology, in April 2021. The company's Series C funding of $200 million in August 2021 was led by Greylock Partners and Redpoint Ventures, joined by new investor IVP, with participation from Sequoia, CRV, and Citi Ventures.

In May 2022 Cribl secured $150M in Series D funding led by Tiger Global Management and joined by existing investors IVP, CRV, Redpoint Ventures, Sequoia, and Greylock. This round brought total funding to $400 million.

In 2023, CrowdStrike introduced CrowdStream in cooperation with Cribl. In October 2023, Cribl.io became the fourth-fastest infrastructure company to reach centaur status ($100 million annual recurring revenue).

In August 2024, Cribl Closes $319 Million Series E at $3.5 Billion Valuation.

In January 2025, Cribl Surpasses $200M in ARR, Growing more than 70 percent Year-over-Year That March, Cribl ranked #1 in Forbes list of America’s Best Startup Employers 2025.

Cribl acquired the IP and technology assets from Radiant Security, an AI-native SOC startup based in San Francisco, in August 2026.

== Copyright lawsuit ==
In October 2022, Splunk, an American technology company, filed a lawsuit against Cribl.io, alleging that the company based its business on stolen intellectual property. Cribl released a public statement denying Splunk's allegations. In April 2024, a California jury found that Cribl did indeed infringe on Splunk's copyright. However it awarded damages to be paid by Cribl of only $1.
