= ThreatConnect =

American cybersecurity firm

ThreatConnect, Inc
- Type: Corporation
- Industry: Network Security
- Founded: April 28th, 2011
- Founder: Adam Vincent (Co-founder), Andrew Pendergast (Co-founder), Leigh Reichel (Co-founder), Balaji Yelemenchilli (Current CEO)
- Headquarters: Arlington, Virginia, United States
- Products: Threat Intelligence Platform, Security Orchestration, Automation, and Response, Cyber Risk Quantification
- Number of employees: 129 (May 2019)
- Website: www.threatconnect.com

ThreatConnect is a cyber-security firm based in Arlington, Virginia. They provide a Threat Intelligence Platform for companies to aggregate and act upon threat intelligence.

== History ==
The firm was founded in 2011 as Cyber Squared Inc. by Adam Vincent, Richard Barger, Andrew Pendergast and Leigh Reichel. They renamed to ThreatConnect after their series A funding of $4 million in 2014, and in December 2015 obtained series B funding of $16 million.

The company gained attention when it linked the Anthem medical data breach to Chinese government-sponsored entities. According to cybercrime expert Brian Krebs, ThreatConnect identified domains used by the group that were intentionally similar to legitimate domains used by Anthem.

They also linked Guccifer 2.0, responsible for the 2016 Democratic National Committee email leak, to the Russian-backed cyberespionage group Fancy Bear. Further cyberattacks they attributed to Fancy Bear include against a group investigating the Malaysia Airlines 17 crash, and the World Anti-Doping Agency who had recently issued a report about state-sponsored doping.

In September 2020, ThreatConnect acquired Virginia-based software company Nehemiah Security.

In October 2025, Dataminr announced plans to acquire ThreatConnect for $290 million in cash and equity.
