= Secureworks =

American cybersecurity company

Secureworks Inc.
- Type: Subsidiary
- Traded as: Nasdaq: SCWX
- Industry: Cybersecurity
- Headquarters: Atlanta, Georgia, U.S.
- Area served: North America; Europe; Middle East; Asia; Africa; South America
- Key people: Wendy K. Thomas (president & CEO)
- Products: Secureworks Taegis XDR, Secureworks Taegis ManagedXDR
- Revenue: ▼US$366 million (2024)
- Operating income: ▲US$−112 million (2024)
- Net income: ▲US$−86 million (2024)
- Total assets: ▼US$725 million (2024)
- Total equity: ▼US$501 million (2024)
- Number of employees: 1,516 (2024)
- Parent: Sophos (2025–present)
- Website: secureworks.com
- Footnotes; Financials as of February 2, 2024

Secureworks Inc. was an American cybersecurity company. The company had approximately 4,000 customers in more than 50 countries, ranging from Fortune 100 companies to mid-sized businesses in a variety of industries.

It became part of Dell Technologies in February 2011 and was later the subject of an initial public offering to again become a publicly traded company in April 2016. It was majority-owned by Dell until 2025 when Secureworks was acquired by Sophos.

== History ==
Secureworks was founded as a privately held company in 1998 by Michael Pearson and Joan Wilbanks. In 2002, Michael R. Cote became president and CEO. In 2005, and again in 2006, the company was named to the Inc. 500 and Inc. 5000 lists 2006 and Deloitte’s Fast 500.

In 2006, Secureworks merged with LURHQ Corporation and the new entity continued under the Secureworks corporate name. LURHQ was founded in 1996 in Myrtle Beach, SC and provided managed security services to large enterprises. With the merger, Secureworks was able to leverage Sherlock, LURHQ's portal, to unify its combined customer base onto a single integrated security management platform.

In 2009, Secureworks acquired the Managed Security Services (MSS) business from VeriSign, Inc. and grew to more than 500 employees worldwide. The acquisition expanded its clients to approximately 2,600 in more than 50 countries, including the United Kingdom, Saudi Arabia, Taiwan, Finland, Spain, Brazil and Mexico. This includes four of the Fortune 10.

In December 2009, Secureworks acquired managed security and consulting firm dns Limited. This acquisition expanded Secureworks' operation to include a UK-based operations center and additional offices in London and Edinburgh.

On January 4, 2011, Dell announced that it would acquire Secureworks to be part of Dell Services. Dell Secureworks officially began operating as a Dell subsidiary on February 7, 2011.

Dell Secureworks expanded into Australia and New Zealand region in 2013. Dell Secureworks opened an operations center in Sydney to meet demands from local Australia businesses, the most in demand services in this area being Penetration Testing, forensic investigations and ongoing monitoring of environments for attacks.

On December 17, 2015, Secureworks filed to go public. Subsequently, on April 22, 2016, announced its IPO, raising $112 million after pricing its IPO at $14 per share. However, the company was expecting the initial price to be between $15.50-$17.50. This was the first tech IPO in the U.S. in 2016. In August 2017, Secureworks rebranded its logo and changed capitalization of the 'W' in its name to lower case.

In an evolution of its long standing business of selling Managed Security Services (MSSP), in April 2019, Secureworks announced the availability of Red Cloak Threat Detection and Response, a cloud-based, SaaS next-generation SIEM product designed to analyse, detect, investigate and respond to malicious threats across an organizations endpoints, network and cloud environment.

Along with 20 other cyber security software providers, Secureworks took part in the MITRE ATT&CK Endpoint Protection Product Evaluation, a globally-accessible knowledge base of adversary tactics and techniques based on real-world observations. The ATT&CK knowledge base is used as a foundation for the development of specific threat models and methodologies in the private sector, in government, and in the cybersecurity product and service community. Secureworks reported that its Red Cloak Threat Detection and Response achieved 100% detection success for the Persistence, Privilege Escalation, Discovery and Lateral Movement tactics in the MITRE ATT&CK Endpoint Protection Product Evaluation. Red Cloak TDR had telemetry visibility across the MITRE ATT&CK Framework and was able to capture attacker activity during each step of the evaluation, as well as provide visibility or generated detections across 90% of technique categories used in the evaluation

May 21, 2020 Secureworks signaled a shift away from a primarily direct go to market model to a channel focused business model with the announcement of the Secureworks Global Partner Program introduced to shift Secureworks toward a channel-focused business model.

On September 3, 2021, Wendy K. Thomas became president and CEO of Secureworks following the retirement of Michael R. Cote.

In October 2024, Sophos agreed to acquire SecureWorks for $859 million; the acquisition was completed in February 2025. As of 2026, the Secureworks website redirects to a landing page on Sophos's website, with no mention of the Secureworks brand aside from a link on the footer.

== Counter Threat Unit ==
The Secureworks Counter Threat Unit (CTU) monitors, tracks, and analyzes threat vulnerabilities of its global client base.

In May 2020, the Secureworks Counter Threat Unit (CTU) research team began publishing Threat Group profiles on the Secureworks website. Threat Groups are "intrusion sets" or "clusters of observed activity"; that exist in cyberspace; attempt to cause harm to organizations or businesses.

The published Threat Group profiles include a summary of the groups, their objectives, other aliases by which the groups are known, and the malware they use. Both criminal and government-sponsored Threat Groups are included.
