= Peter W. Smith =

American banker and political operative (1936–2017)

- Born: February 23, 1936; Portland, Maine, U.S.
- Died: May 14, 2017 (aged 81); Rochester, Minnesota, U.S.
- Education: Northeastern University (BS); University of Notre Dame (MBA)
- Occupation: Investment banker
- Years active: 1969–2017
- Political party: Republican

Peter W. Smith (February 23, 1936 – May 14, 2017) was an American investment banker who had a 40-year career managing corporate acquisitions and venture investments. He was active in Republican politics. In 1998, he was identified as a major financial supporter of the 1993 Troopergate story, in which several Arkansas state troopers accused U.S. President Bill Clinton of having carried out sexual dalliances while he was Governor of Arkansas.

In 2017, he confirmed to The Wall Street Journal that, along with former national security advisor Michael Flynn, he had tried in 2016 to contact computer hackers, including Russian hackers, in an attempt to obtain opposition research material to use against Hillary Clinton in the 2016 presidential election. Ten days after speaking to the paper, he committed suicide in a Minnesota hotel room, citing ill health.

== Early life and education ==
Smith was born in Portland, Maine, and attended Northeastern University, where he earned a B.S. in electrical engineering. He went on to earn an MBA from the University of Notre Dame.

== Career ==
From 1969 to 1980 he was a senior officer at Field Enterprises, Inc. From 1975 to 1997 he was president of his own firm, Peter W. Smith & Company, specializing in buyout transactions. From 1997 to 2014 he was Managing Member of DigaComm, LLC where he primarily managed early venture investments. At the time of his death he was Chairman Emeritus of Corporate Venture Alliances, LLC.

=== Political involvement ===
He was national chairman of the College Young Republicans. He was a board member and officer of the Atlantic Council of the United States and was also active with The Heritage Foundation, the Center for Strategic and International Studies, and the Brookings Institution. He was a contributor and fundraiser for the Republican National Committee, GOPAC, and to individual candidates. Smith was a major donor to Newt Gingrich's GOPAC, giving over $100,000 from 1989 to 1995—a sum which made him one of GOPAC's top 20 donors.

In December 1993, two Arkansas state troopers publicly claimed that they and other troopers had been used to facilitate and conceal multiple extra-marital affairs of then-Governor Bill Clinton. The stories were published in an article by then-conservative author David Brock in the American Spectator and also in a series of articles in the Los Angeles Times. Smith had arranged for the troopers to meet Brock. In February 1994 Smith started a "Troopergate Whistle Blower Fund" to provide support for the troopers and pay their attorney fees; the fund ultimately raised about $40,000. Altogether Smith said he spent about $80,000 on the case, including a $5,000 payment to Brock. Smith described his donations as an independent effort to encourage anti-Clinton stories in the mainstream press.

Several emails sent by Smith to the Illinois Republican Party turned up among those hacked from party computers and posted on DCLeaks, which U.S. intelligence officials believe to be an outlet for the foreign military intelligence agency of Russia, GRU. The emails were about a 2015 congressional election.

In May 2017 Smith told Shane Harris of the Wall Street Journal that he had been actively involved, during the 2016 presidential election campaign, trying to obtain emails he believed had been deleted from Hillary Clinton's computer server. Smith stated, "We knew the people who had these were probably around the Russian government" and told various internet groups to give any emails to Wikileaks. To act as a vehicle for his efforts, Smith established the Delaware-based firm KLS Research LLC on September 2, 2016, and opened a bank account for KLS at Northern Trust where he also had a personal account. For advice on obtaining Clinton's emails and with support from Smith's assistant Jonathan Safron, Smith and his associate John Szobocsan contacted several experts in cyber security including Eric York, Matt Tait, the consulting firm Flynn Intel Group associated with Michael G. Flynn and his father Michael Flynn with whom Smith had established a business together in November 2015 immediately after Flynn retired from the Army. Smith reached out to Guccifer 2.0 and Charles Johnson suggested that Smith contact Andrew Auernheimer alias Weev.

According to the Mueller Report, Trump campaign advisor Mike Flynn contacted Smith shortly after July 27, 2016, when Trump had publicly invited "Russia" to find the missing emails, and asked Smith to look for them. In that quest Smith contacted several known hacker groups, including some Russian groups. He was shown some information but was not convinced it was genuine, and suggested the hackers give it to WikiLeaks instead. As part of this effort, Smith donated $150,000 to "the Washington Scholarship Fund for the Russian students", including $100,000 of solicited money and $50,000 from his personal funds.

Smith was close to Sam Clovis. He maintained a blog called Peter W. Smith.

== Personal life ==
Smith lived in Lake Forest, Illinois. He was married to Janet; the couple had three children and three grandchildren at the time of his death.

== Death ==
Smith died on May 14, 2017, in a hotel room in Rochester, Minnesota. He had checked into the hotel, which is near the Mayo Clinic, the day after speaking to The Wall Street Journal. Nine days later, he was found with a bag over his head that was attached to a helium source. Medical records listed Smith's cause of death as "asphyxiation due to displacement of oxygen in confined space with helium." Police discovered a suicide note by Smith that stated "no foul play whatsoever", and that he was in poor health and his life insurance policy was about to expire.

== See also ==
- Russian interference in the 2016 United States elections
