= Mueller report =

2019 U.S. government report on Russian interference in the 2016 election

The redacted version of the Report on the Investigation into Russian Interference in the 2016 Presidential Election was released to the public by the Department of Justice on April 18, 2019.

Report On The Investigation Into Russian Interference In The 2016 Presidential Election, more commonly known as the Mueller report, is the official report documenting the findings and conclusions of former Special Counsel Robert Mueller's investigation into Russian efforts to interfere in the 2016 United States presidential election, allegations of conspiracy or coordination between Donald Trump's presidential campaign and Russia, and allegations of obstruction of justice. The report was submitted to Attorney General William Barr on March 22, 2019, and a redacted version of the 448-page report was publicly released by the Department of Justice (DOJ) on April 18, 2019. It is divided into two volumes. The redactions from the report and its supporting material were placed under a temporary "protective assertion" of executive privilege by then-President Trump on May 8, 2019, preventing the material from being passed to Congress, despite earlier reassurance by Barr that Trump would not exert privilege.

While the report concludes that the investigation "did not establish that members of the Trump campaign conspired or coordinated with the Russian government in its election interference activities", investigators had an incomplete picture of what happened due in part to some communications that were encrypted, deleted, or not saved, as well as testimony that was false, incomplete, or declined. The report states that Russian interference in the 2016 presidential election was illegal and occurred "in sweeping and systematic fashion", and was welcomed by the Trump campaign as it expected to benefit from such efforts. It also identifies multiple links between the Trump campaign and Russian officials, about which several persons connected to the campaign made false statements and obstructed investigations. Mueller later stated that his investigation's findings of Russian interference "deserves the attention of every American".

Volume II of the report addresses obstruction of justice. The investigation intentionally took an approach that could not result in a judgment that Trump committed a crime. This decision was based on an Office of Legal Counsel (OLC) opinion that a sitting president is immune from criminal prosecution, and Mueller's belief that it would be unfair to accuse the president of a crime even without charging him because he would have no opportunity to clear his name in court; furthermore it would undermine Trump's ability to govern and preempt impeachment. As such, the investigation "does not conclude that the President committed a crime"; however, "it also does not exonerate him", with investigators not confident of Trump's innocence. The report describes ten episodes where Trump may have obstructed justice while president and one before he was elected, noting that he privately tried to "control the investigation". The report further states that Congress can decide whether Trump obstructed justice and take action accordingly, referencing impeachment.

Even before seeing the Mueller report, Barr had already decided not to charge Trump with obstruction of justice. To this end, upon receiving the report, he tasked the Office of Legal Counsel (OLC) with writing an internal memo that would provide a pretextual justification for his decision. The four-page Barr letter was written over the course of two days in tandem with a legal memo upon which the letter ostensibly relied and was released to Congress on March 24, purporting to detail the Mueller report's conclusions and announcing Barr's decision not to charge Trump. On March 27, Mueller privately wrote to Barr, stating that Barr's March 24 letter "did not fully capture the context, nature, and substance of this office's work and conclusions" and that this led to "public confusion". Barr declined Mueller's request to release the report's introduction and executive summaries ahead of the full report. On April 18, Barr held a 90-minute press conference where he and senior Justice Department officials defended Trump and their decision not to charge him with obstruction, immediately prior to the public release of the Mueller report. Following the release of the Mueller report, Barr's letter was widely criticized as an intentionally misleading effort to shape public perceptions in favor of Trump, with commentators identifying significant factual discrepancies. On May 1, Barr testified that he "didn't exonerate" Trump on obstruction as "that's not what the Justice Department does" and that neither he nor Rosenstein had reviewed the underlying evidence in the report. In July 2019, Mueller testified to Congress that a president could be charged with crimes including obstruction of justice after the president left office.

== Background ==
The order from Deputy Attorney General Rod Rosenstein, dated May 17, 2017, appointing a special counsel to investigate Russian interference in the 2016 United States elections

The letter from United States Attorney General William Barr dated March 22, 2019, notifying leaders of the House and Senate judiciary committees about the conclusion of the investigation

=== Impetus for investigation ===
On May 9, 2017, President Donald Trump dismissed former Director of the Federal Bureau of Investigation, James Comey, who had been leading an ongoing Federal Bureau of Investigation (FBI) investigation into links between Trump associates and Russian officials. This investigation, code named Crossfire Hurricane, began in July 2016 after the Australian government advised US authorities that George Papadopoulos, a foreign policy advisor in the Trump campaign, had met with one of their diplomats in May 2016 and "suggested the Trump team had received some kind of suggestion from Russia" that Russia could release information that would be damaging to Hillary Clinton. Papadopolous had received this suggestion in April 2016, well before it was publicly reported that Russia had damaging information about Clinton (the Democratic National Committee had in June 2016 announced that a Russian hack occurred). Papadopoulos later testified that this "damaging information" was in the form of hacked emails that were stolen from the Democratic Party.

Over 130 Democratic lawmakers of the United States Congress called for a special counsel to be appointed in reaction to Comey's firing. CNN reported that within eight days of Comey's dismissal, an FBI investigation on Trump for obstruction of justice was opened by the acting FBI Director at the time, Andrew McCabe, who cited multiple reasons including Comey's firing. After McCabe was later fired from the FBI, he confirmed that he had opened the obstruction investigation, and gave additional reasons for its launch.

Then-Attorney General Jeff Sessions announcing his recusal from investigations into the Trump campaign in March 2017

Eight days after Comey's dismissal, then-Deputy Attorney General Rod Rosenstein appointed Robert Mueller, under 28 CFR § 600.1, as special counsel to take over and expand an existing FBI counterintelligence investigation into possible Russian interference in the 2016 United States elections, as well as the FBI investigation into links between Trump associates and Russian officials that Comey was leading. The special counsel also took over the FBI investigation into whether President Trump obstructed justice with Comey. Rosenstein's authority to appoint Mueller arose due to Attorney General Jeff Sessions' March 2017 recusal of himself from investigations into the Trump campaign.

=== Scope and mandate ===
According to its authorizing document, which was signed by then-Deputy Attorney General Rod Rosenstein on May 17, 2017, the investigation's scope included allegations that there were links or coordination between President Donald Trump's presidential campaign and the Russian government as well as "any matters that arose or may arise directly from the investigation". The authorizing document also included "any other matters within the scope of 28 CFR § 600.4(a)"; enabling the special counsel "to investigate and prosecute" any attempts to interfere with its investigation, "such as perjury, obstruction of justice, destruction of evidence, and intimidation of witnesses".

=== Proceedings of investigation ===
The Special Counsel investigation ran from May 17, 2017, to March 22, 2019, and resulted in thirty-four indictments, including against several former members of the Trump campaign and many of which are still being tried. The investigation issued over 2,800 subpoenas, executed almost 500 search warrants, and interviewed approximately 500 witnesses.

The Mueller report included references to 14 criminal investigations that were referred to other offices, 12 of which were completely redacted in the April 18 release. The other two related to Michael Cohen and Gregory Craig, cases that were already public.

== Findings ==
=== Volume I ===
Volume I starts on page 1 of the report and focuses on Russian interference and allegations of "conspiracy" or "coordination" between Trump's presidential campaign and Russia, "not the concept of 'collusion'".

==== Russian interference ====
The Mueller report found that the Russian government "interfered in the 2016 presidential election in sweeping and systematic fashion" and "violated U.S. criminal law". The report relayed two methods by which Russia attempted to influence the election.

===== Social media campaign =====
The first method of Russian interference was done through the Internet Research Agency (IRA), waging "a social media campaign that favored presidential candidate Donald J. Trump and disparaged presidential candidate Hillary Clinton". The IRA also sought to "provoke and amplify political and social discord in the United States".

By February 2016, internal IRA documents showed an order to support the candidacies of Donald Trump and Bernie Sanders, while IRA members were to "use any opportunity to criticize" Hillary Clinton and the rest of the candidates. From June 2016, the IRA organized election rallies in the U.S. "often promoting" Trump's campaign while "opposing" Clinton's campaign. The IRA posed as Americans, hiding their Russian background, while asking Trump campaign members for campaign buttons, flyers, and posters for the rallies. The Mueller report detailed that the IRA spent $100,000 for over 3,500 Facebook advertisements, which included anti-Clinton and pro-Trump advertisements.

The report lists IRA-created groups on Facebook to include "purported conservative groups" (e.g. 'Tea Party News'), "purported Black social justice groups" (e.g. 'Blacktivist') "LGBTQ groups" (e.g. 'LGBT United'), "and religious groups" (e.g. 'United Muslims of America'). The IRA Twitter accounts included @TEN_GOP (claiming to be related to the Tennessee Republican Party), @jenn_abrams, and @Pamela_Moore13 (both claimed to be Trump supporters and both had 70,000 followers). Several Trump campaign members (Donald J. Trump Jr., Eric Trump, Kellyanne Conway, Brad Parscale, and Michael Flynn) linked or reposted material from the IRA's @TEN_GOP Twitter account listed above. Other people who responded to IRA social media accounts include Michael McFaul, Sean Hannity, Roger Stone, and Michael G. Flynn (Michael Flynn's son).

===== Hacking and release of material =====
The second method of Russian interference saw the Russian military intelligence agency GRU hacking into email accounts owned by volunteers and employees of the Clinton presidential campaign, including that of campaign chairman John Podesta, and also hacking into "the computer networks of the Democratic Congressional Campaign Committee (DCCC) and the Democratic National Committee (DNC)". As a result, the GRU obtained hundreds of thousands of hacked documents, and the GRU proceeded by arranging releases of damaging hacked material via the WikiLeaks organization and also GRU's false personas "DCLeaks" and "Guccifer 2.0".

==== Conspiracy or coordination vs collusion ====
The investigation found there were at least 140 contacts between Trump or 18 of his associates with Russian nationals and WikiLeaks, or their intermediaries, though the contacts were insufficient to show an illegal conspiracy. To establish whether a crime was committed by members of the Trump campaign with regard to Russian interference, investigators "applied the framework of conspiracy law", and not the concept of "collusion", because collusion "is not a specific offense or theory of liability found in the United States Code, nor is it a term of art in federal criminal law". They also investigated if members of the Trump campaign "coordinated" with Russia, using the definition of "coordination" as having "an agreement – tacit or express – between the Trump campaign and the Russian government on election interference." Investigators further elaborated that merely having "two parties taking actions that were informed by or responsive to the other's actions or interests" was not enough to establish coordination.

The special counsel identified two methods the Russian government tried to communicate with the Trump campaign. "The investigation identified two different forms of connections between the IRA and members of the Trump Campaign. [...] First, on multiple occasions, members and surrogates of the Trump Campaign promoted – typically by linking, retweeting, or similar methods of reposting – pro-Trump or anti-Clinton content published by the IRA through IRA-controlled social media accounts. Additionally, in a few instances, IRA employees represented themselves as U.S. persons to communicate with members of the Trump Campaign in an effort to seek assistance and coordination on IRA-organized political rallies inside the United States", the report states.

Secondly, the report details a meeting at Trump Tower in June 2016. The intent of the meeting was to exchange "dirt" on the Clinton campaign. There was speculation that Trump Jr. told his father. However, the special counsel could not find any evidence that he did. The office declined to pursue charges for two reasons: the office "did not obtain admissible evidence" that would meet the burden of proof principle beyond a reasonable doubt that the campaign officials acted with general knowledge about the illegality of their conduct; secondly, the office expected difficulty in valuing the promised information that "exceeded the threshold for a criminal violation" of $2,000 for a criminal violation and $25,000 for a felony punishment.

The Report cited several impediments to investigators' ability to acquire information, including witnesses invoking their Fifth Amendment right against self-incrimination, witnesses deleting electronic communications or using encrypted or self-destructing messaging apps, limitations of interviewing attorneys or individuals asserting they were members of the media, information obtained through subpoenas that was screened from investigators due to legal privilege, and false or incomplete testimony provided by witnesses.

While "conspiracy" or "coordination" was not proven, Mueller's report left many unanswered questions, such as whether the myriad secret contacts between Trump associates and Russians, which they lied about, constituted, using Mueller's words, "a third avenue of attempted Russian interference with or influence on the 2016 presidential election"? Benjamin Wittes has written about this:

Put another way, what is the story these contacts tell if it's not one of active coordination? They surely aren't, in the aggregate, innocent. They aren't normal business practice for a presidential campaign. When Mueller asks whether they constituted some sort of third avenue for Russian interference, he's really asking, in the prosecutorial language available to him, what to make of them.... To my mind, anyway, that's the story Mueller told in this section. It may not be a crime, but it is a very deep betrayal.

George Croner of the Foreign Policy Research Institute has also expressed his concerns with what he describes as a "curiously flaccid" approach taken by Mueller in dealing with what the public would normally interpret as "coordination". He sees Mueller's dependence on a formal "tacit agreement" approach as "an overly cautious" and "legalistic construct":

To most individuals, at some point, persistent parallel conduct coupled with "multiple links" between the participants increasingly suggests that the conduct is coordinated – not coincidentally parallel.... [I]t is not surprising that many are confounded by the Special Counsel's inability, or refusal, to render a conclusion on what is publicly perceived as having been the raison d'être of the inquiry.

Ryan Goodman from Just Security wrote:

The redacted Mueller Report documents a series of activities that show strong evidence of collusion. Or, more precisely, it provides significant evidence that Trump Campaign associates coordinated with, cooperated with, encouraged, or gave support to the Russia/WikiLeaks election interference activities.

Goodman then summarized 14 categories of evidence that were documented by the Mueller report.

===== False "no collusion" claims =====
Trump and many of his supporters have falsely claimed there was "no collusion", even though Mueller made no conclusion about "collusion", only about "conspiracy" or "coordination", and Mueller pushed back against such claims. Senator Lindsey Graham falsely stated "Mr. Mueller and his team concluded there was no collusion." House Minority Leader Kevin McCarthy stated "Nothing we saw today changes the underlying results of the 22-month-long Mueller investigation that ultimately found no collusion". In an April 18, 2019, press conference, Attorney General William Barr "noted that, as the president 'said from the beginning, there was in fact no collusion' with Moscow's attempts to interfere in the election". Representative Matt Gaetz tweeted a photo showing him holding up the front page of the conservative Washington Times splashed with a big photo of Barr and the headline: "No Russia Conspiracy, No Collusion." The American Bar Association headlined an article with the title, "Mueller finds no collusion with Russia...", which reflected a quote from Trump in the article: "'It was just announced there was no collusion with Russia,' Trump said Sunday 'It was a complete and total exoneration'."

In a January 2019 interview with CNN's Chris Cuomo, Trump's attorney, Rudy Giuliani undermined Trump's claim when he "claimed Wednesday night that he 'never said there was no collusion' between President Trump's campaign and Russia leading up to the 2016 presidential election."

Giuliani: [complained about] "false reporting" on the Russia investigation.
Cuomo: "Mr. Mayor, false reporting is saying that nobody in the campaign had any contacts with Russia. False reporting is saying that there has been no suggestion of any kind of collusion between the campaign and any Russians."
Giuliani: "You just misstated my position. I never said there was no collusion between the campaign, or between people in the campaign."
Cuomo: "Yes, you have."

After his comments on CNN, Giuliani made statements that NPR described as an "apparent reversal" from his TV interview: He said "'there was no collusion by President Trump in any way, shape or form' and that he had 'no knowledge of any collusion by any of the thousands of people who worked on the campaign'."

Former CIA Director John Brennan stated that Trump's claims of "no collusion" with Russia were "hogwash":

The only questions that remain are whether the collusion that took place constituted criminally liable conspiracy, whether obstruction of justice occurred to cover up any collusion or conspiracy, and how many members of 'Trump Incorporated' attempted to defraud the government by laundering and concealing the movement of money into their pockets.

Although Mueller "never used the 'no collusion' phrase", some otherwise reliable sources began to repeat the false claim that his report had done so, and many sources continue to misleadingly use those words.

David A. Graham of The Atlantic has noted that in spite of Trump's "mantra that 'there was no collusion' ... it is clear that the Trump campaign and later transition were eager to work with Russia, and to keep that secret."

Randall Eliason has questioned whether collusion is not a crime: "Saying the president is off the hook because there is no crime called 'collusion' is akin to claiming the president could shoot someone on 5th Avenue and escape prosecution because the criminal statutes prohibit 'homicide' not 'shooting'."

=== Volume II ===
Volume II starts on page 208 of the official PDF file of the report and details potential instances of obstruction of justice. Page numbering in the file restarts with Volume II.

==== Trump's reaction to Mueller appointment ====
According to the report, upon learning that Mueller had been appointed as Special Counsel, Trump said "Oh my God. This is terrible. This is the end of my presidency. I'm fucked", to Jeff Sessions when they were having a meeting in the Oval Office. "You were supposed to protect me", Sessions recalled Trump telling him. "Everyone tells me if you get one of these independent counsels it ruins your presidency. It takes years and years and I won't be able to do anything. This is the worst thing that ever happened to me", Trump later said, according to Sessions and Jody Hunt, Sessions' then-chief of staff.

==== Obstruction of justice ====
Regarding obstruction of justice, the report stated that the investigation "did not establish that the President was involved in an underlying crime related to Russian election interference", but investigators wrote that obstruction of justice could still occur "regardless of whether a person committed an underlying wrong". Trump, Barr, Rudy Giuliani and others have persistently and incorrectly maintained that an individual cannot obstruct justice unless the individual committed an underlying crime.

On obstruction of justice, the report "does not conclude that the President committed a crime, [and] it also does not exonerate him". Since the special counsel's office had decided "not to make a traditional prosecutorial judgment", they "did not draw ultimate conclusions about the President's conduct". The report "does not conclude that the president committed a crime", as investigators decided "not to apply an approach that could potentially result in a judgment that the president committed crimes". Investigators did not make a judgment about whether to charge Trump with a crime, for two main reasons: Firstly, the investigation abided by DOJ Office of Legal Counsel (OLC) opinion written in 2000 that a sitting president cannot be federally indicted, a stance taken from the start of the investigation. Secondly, investigators did not want to charge Trump because a federal criminal charge would hinder a sitting president's "capacity to govern and potentially preempt constitutional process for addressing presidential misconduct", with a footnote reference to impeachment. Even if charges were recommended in a secret memo or a charging document sealed until Trump's presidency ended, the information could still be leaked. In addition, the special counsel's office rejected the alternative option of accusing Trump of committing a crime without bringing a charge. Investigators felt that this alternative option would be unfair to Trump, as there would be no trial in which Trump could clear his own name.

The special counsel's office did not exonerate Trump on obstruction of justice because they were not confident that Trump was clearly innocent, after examining "evidence [they] obtained about the President's actions and intent". The "investigation found multiple acts by the President that were capable of exerting undue influence over law enforcement investigations, including the Russian-interference and obstruction investigations". The report noted that once Trump was aware that he was personally being investigated for obstruction of justice, he started "public attacks on the investigation and individuals involved in it who could possess evidence adverse to the president, while in private, the president engaged in a series of targeted efforts to control the investigation." However, President Trump's "efforts to influence the investigation were mostly unsuccessful, but that is largely because the persons who surrounded the President declined to carry out orders or accede to his requests." This prevented further obstruction of justice charges "against the President's aides and associates beyond those already filed".

The report notes that Congress has the authority to decide if Trump obstructed justice, and then take further action if obstruction occurred, with investigators writing: "The conclusion that Congress may apply the obstruction laws to the president's corrupt exercise of the powers of office accords with our constitutional system of checks and balances and the principle that no person is above the law." This phrase was interpreted as a possible reference to Congress potentially initiating impeachment proceedings against President Trump.

=== Episodes of alleged obstruction ===
Some sources such as FactCheck.org, PBS NewsHour, and The New York Times describe the report as detailing eleven episodes where Trump may have obstructed justice; one episode as a presidential candidate or president-elect, and ten episodes while Trump was president:

Attorney General William Barr stated that there are ten episodes of potential obstruction. Other sources such as The Washington Post and The Hill also report ten episodes; both omit the episode when Trump was a presidential candidate or president-elect. CBS News counts ten episodes, omitting the one involving Corey Lewandowski.

Quinta Jurecic, the managing editor of Lawfare, created a chart to simplify and summarize Mueller's analysis of these episodes in the report. Jurecic does not analyze the episode that occurred when Trump was a presidential candidate or president-elect.

==== Trump campaign's response to Russian support ====
Section A of Volume II of the report describes the events of this episode.

The report states that the first possible obstruction case was during the 2016 presidential campaign, when questions "arose about the Russian government's apparent support for candidate Trump". The report states that while Trump was publicly skeptical Russia had released emails from Democratic officials, Trump and his aides were also trying to obtain information about "any further planned WikiLeaks releases". According to the report, shortly after a WikiLeaks release, Rick Gates, then Deputy Campaign Chairman, was going to LaGuardia Airport with Trump when Trump took a phone call. After the call, "candidate Trump told Gates that more releases of damaging information would be coming". The report also notes that Trump consistently said that he had no business connections to Russia, despite his company trying to build a Trump Tower in Moscow. "After the election, the President expressed concerns to advisors that reports of Russia's election interference might lead the public to question the legitimacy of his election".

==== President's conduct in Michael Flynn investigation ====
Section B of Volume II of the report describes the events of this episode.

The report outlines Michael Flynn's, Trump's first National Security Advisor, contact with Russian Ambassador Sergey Kislyak, shortly after the Obama Administration imposed sanctions against Russia on December 29, 2016. Later that day, K. T. McFarland, "who was slated to become the Deputy National Security Advisor ... talked by phone about what, if anything, Flynn should communicate to Kislyak about the sanctions". The report details that based on those conversations, "McFarland informed Flynn that incoming Administration officials at Mar-a-Lago did not want Russia to escalate the situation". Former Chief of Staff Reince Priebus "recalled that McFarland may have mentioned at the meeting that the sanctions situation could be 'cooled down' and not escalated". Priebus recalls that President-Elect Trump viewed the sanctions "as an attempt by the Obama Administration to embarrass him by delegitimizing his election". Later that evening, Flynn called Kislyak and requested how Russia should respond to the newly-placed U.S. sanctions: "only in a reciprocal manner, without escalating the situation". Afterwards, Flynn briefed McFarland on the call. Flynn said that the Russian response to the sanctions "was not going to be escalatory because Russia wanted a good relationship with the Trump Administration". On December 30, Russian President Vladimir Putin announced that Russia "would not take retaliatory measures in response to the sanctions at that time and would instead 'plan . . . further steps to restore Russian-US relations based on the policies of the Trump Administration'". Trump responded to the news by tweeting "Great move on delay (by V. Putin) – I always knew he was very smart!" The report details that Trump was warned by Don McGahn and Priebus to not discuss about the Russian investigation with Comey, but Trump did so anyway.

The Mueller report described a November 2017 voicemail Flynn's attorneys received from Trump's "personal counsel", reportedly John Dowd, who stated, "[I]f...there's information that implicates the President, then we've got a national security issue,...so, you know, ...we need some kind of heads up", reiterating the president's "feelings toward Flynn and, that still remains". Flynn's attorneys called Trump's attorney to reiterate that they could no longer share information with him because their joint defense agreement was canceled upon Flynn's guilty plea, at which point the attorney became "indignant and vocal in his disagreement", indicating that Trump would be advised that this represented "hostility" toward him. The New York Times reported on June 9, 2019, that Mueller's office opted to not question Dowd about the voicemail as potential obstruction of justice, possibly leading to Trump, because the ambiguity of the voicemail raised concerns of violating attorney-client privilege and protracted litigation.

==== President's reaction to the FBI's Russia investigation being publicized ====
Section C of Volume II of the report describes the events of this episode.

After Trump learned that then-Attorney General Jeff Sessions planned to recuse himself from the Special Counsel investigation, Trump sought to prevent Session's move. "After Sessions announced his recusal on March 2, the President expressed anger at Sessions for the decision and then privately asked Sessions to "unrecuse". On March 20, Comey publicly disclosed the FBI's Russia investigation. "In the days that followed, the President contacted Comey and other intelligence agency leaders and asked them to push back publicly on the suggestion that the President had any connection to the Russian election-interference effort in order to 'lift the cloud' of the ongoing investigation", the report says.

==== Dismissal of James Comey ====
Section D of Volume II of the report describes the events of this episode.

"In the week leading up to Comey's May 3, 2017, Senate Judiciary Committee testimony, the President told Don McGahn that it would be the last straw if Comey did not set the record straight and publicly announce that the President was not under investigation, despite repeated requests that Comey make such an announcement," the report states. Trump told his aides that he was going to fire Comey on May 5, and did so on May 9. The report notes that Trump fired Comey before he received a recommendation by the Justice Department. "Substantial evidence indicates that the catalyst for the President's decision to fire Comey was Comey's unwillingness to publicly state that the President was not personally under investigation, despite the President's repeated requests that Comey make such an announcement", the report reads. Trump boasted about the firing of Comey to the Russian foreign minister and U.S. Ambassador of Russia in an Oval Office meeting in May 2017, saying: "I just fired the head of the F.B.I. He was crazy, a real nut job. I faced great pressure because of Russia. That's taken off."

==== President's efforts to remove the Special Counsel ====
Section E of Volume II of the report describes the events of this episode.

When Jeff Sessions recused himself from the Special Counsel investigation, the report notes that Trump said something along the lines of: "that it was the end of his presidency and that Attorney General Sessions had failed to protect him and should resign. Sessions submitted his resignation, which the President ultimately did not accept". The report notes that on June 14, 2017, "the press reported that the President was being personally investigated for obstruction of justice and the President responded with a series of tweets criticizing the Special Counsel's investigation". The following weekend, Trump called McGahn and "directed him to have the Special Counsel removed because of asserted conflicts of interest". McGahn did not act on the request "for fear of being seen as triggering another Saturday Night Massacre and instead prepared to resign". McGahn formally departed the Trump administration on October 17, 2018.

==== President's efforts to curtail the Special Counsel investigation ====
Section F of Volume II of the report describes the events of this episode.

On June 19, 2017, two days after Trump tried to have Don McGahn fire the special counsel, Trump went to Sessions. Trump had a one-on-one meeting in the Oval Office with Corey Lewandowski, former Trump campaign manager who was not working for the government. Trump wanted Lewandowski to deliver a message to Sessions that would "have had the effect of limiting the Russia investigation to future election interference only". The report relays that Trump told Lewandowski "that Sessions was weak and that if the President had known about the likelihood of recusal in advance, he would not have appointed Sessions". Trump dictated the following message meant for Sessions, and Lewandowski noted it down: "I know that I recused myself from certain things having to do with specific areas. But our POTUS . .. is being treated very unfairly. He shouldn't have a Special Prosecutor/Counsel b/c he hasn't done anything wrong. I was on the campaign w/ him for nine months, there were no Russians involved with him. I know it for a fact b/c I was there. He didn't do anything wrong except he ran the greatest campaign in American history". The message goes on in which Sessions would meet with the Special Counsel and limit its jurisdiction to future election interference. "Now a group of people want to subvert the Constitution of the United States. I am going to meet with the Special Prosecutor to explain this is very unfair and let the Special Prosecutor move forward with investigating election meddling for future elections so that nothing can happen in future elections". Trump reportedly said that "if Sessions delivered that statement he would be the 'most popular guy in the country.'" Lewandowski arranged a meeting with Sessions, but it was cancelled "due to a last minute conflict".

On July 19, 2017, Trump again met Lewandowski in the Oval Office, and inquired if Lewandowski passed the message to Sessions. Lewandowski replied that it would be done soon. The report continues: "Lewandowski recalled that the President told him that if Sessions did not meet with him, Lewandowski should tell Sessions he was fired". Immediately after this second meeting, Lewandowski passed the message to White House official Rick Dearborn to relay to Sessions. Dearborn was uncomfortable with the task and chose not to not pass the message, although the report quotes Dearborn as telling Lewandowski that he had "handled the situation".

==== President's efforts to prevent disclosures about Trump Tower meeting ====
Section G of Volume II of the report describes the events of this episode.

The report cites three different occasions between June 29 and July 9, 2017, when Trump directed Hope Hicks, former White House Communications Director, and others to not disclose information about the Trump Tower meeting on June 9, 2016. These requests were directed to the press and could have constituted obstruction only if Trump "sought to withhold information from or mislead congressional investigations or the Special Counsel". The Special Counsel could not find any evidence to establish that Trump intended on preventing the Special Counsel or Congress from obtaining the emails or information referring to the meeting. Rick Gates, then Deputy Campaign Chairman, recalled that Donald Trump Jr., Eric Trump, Jared Kushner, Ivanka Trump, Paul Manafort, and Russian lawyer Natalia Veselnitskaya, were meeting. The ostensible purpose of the meeting was to receive "dirt" on the Clinton presidential campaign. Gates testified that Trump Jr. announced at a regular planned meeting that he "had a lead on negative information about the Clinton Foundation". Gates recalled Manafort saying at the meeting that the Trump Tower meeting "likely would not yield vital information and they should be careful". The Special Counsel found Manafort to be correct, as the "dirt" was information regarding the Ziff brothers doing tax evasion and money laundering in Russia and "donated the illegal profits to the DNC or the Clinton Campaign". There was speculation that Trump Jr. told his father. However, the Special Counsel could not find any evidence that he did.

The office declined to pursue charges for two reasons: the office "did not obtain admissible evidence" that would meet the burden of proof principle beyond a reasonable doubt that the campaign officials acted with general knowledge about the illegality of their conduct; secondly, the office expected difficulty in valuing the promised information that "exceeded the threshold for a criminal violation" of $2,000 for a criminal violation and $25,000 for a felony punishment.

==== President's efforts to have Attorney General control investigation ====
Section H of Volume II of the report describes the events of this episode.

The report notes that between 2017–2018, Trump tried to convince Jeff Sessions to reverse his recusal over the Special Counsel investigation. Trump also tried to convince Sessions to launch an investigation into Hillary Clinton and prosecute her. "On multiple occasions in 2017, the President spoke with Sessions about reversing his recusal so that he could take over the Russia investigation and begin an investigation of Hillary Clinton ... There is evidence that at least one purpose of the President's conduct toward Sessions was to have Sessions assume control over the Russia investigation and supervise it in a way that could restrict its scope. [...] A reasonable inference from those statements and the President's action is that an unrecused Attorney General would play a protective role and could shield the President from the ongoing Russia investigation".

==== President orders McGahn to deny reports ====
Section I of Volume II of the report describes the events of this episode.

After the news broke out in late January 2018, that Trump ordered Don McGahn to fire Robert Mueller in June 2017, Trump pressured McGahn to deny the reports. "After the story broke, the President, through his personal counsel and two aides, sought to have McGahn deny that he had been directed to remove the Special Counsel," the report reads. Trump told then-White House Staff Secretary Rob Porter to tell McGahn to create a record that makes clear Trump never directed McGahn to fire the Special Counsel. "Porter thought the matter should be handled by the White House communications office, but the President said he wanted McGahn to write a letter to the file 'for our records' and wanted something beyond a press statement to demonstrate that the reporting was inaccurate. The President referred to McGahn as a 'lying bastard' and said that he wanted a record from him". Porter recalled Trump "saying something to the effect of 'If he doesn't write a letter, then maybe I'll have to get rid of him'". Trump did not fire McGahn, who departed on October 17, 2018.

==== President's conduct towards Flynn, Manafort, and "redacted name" ====
Section J of Volume II of the report describes the events of this episode.

The report details that Trump took actions "directed at possible witnesses in the Special Counsel's investigation". The report notes that actions taken by Trump and his counsel "could have had the potential to affect Flynn's decision to cooperate, as well as the extent of that cooperation. Because of privilege issues, however, we could not determine whether the President was personally involved in or knew about the specific message his counsel delivered to Flynn's counsel". For Manafort, the report details by saying: "With respect to Manafort, there is evidence that the President's actions had the potential to influence Manafort's decision whether to cooperate with the government".

In January 2019, Manafort's lawyers submitted a filing to the court in response to an allegation from the Special Counsel that Manafort had lied to investigators. Through an error in redacting, the document accidentally revealed that while he was campaign chairman, Manafort met with Konstantin Kilimnik, who is believed to be a Russian intelligence officer. The filing says Manafort gave him polling data related to the 2016 campaign and discussed a Ukrainian peace plan with him. Most of the polling data was reportedly public, although some was private Trump campaign polling data. Manafort asked Kilimnik to pass the data to Ukrainians Serhiy Lyovochkin and Rinat Akhmetov. The Republican-controlled Senate Intelligence Committee concluded in August 2020 that Manafort's contacts with Kilimnik and other affiliates of Russian intelligence "represented a grave counterintelligence threat" because his "presence on the Campaign and proximity to Trump created opportunities for Russian intelligence services to exert influence over, and acquire confidential information on, the Trump campaign."

==== President's conduct involving Michael Cohen ====
Section K of Volume II of the report describes the events of this episode.

The final instance of potential obstruction concerns Michael Cohen, a former personal lawyer of Trump's. "There is evidence that could support the inference that the President intended to discourage Cohen from cooperating with the government because Cohen's information would shed adverse light on the President's campaign-period conduct and statements", the report states. The report continues by detailing that Trump encouraged Cohen to "stay strong": "After the FBI searched Cohen's home and office in April 2018, the President publicly asserted that Cohen would not "flip" and privately passes messages of support to him". However, the report notes that when Cohen began cooperating with the government in the summer of 2018, Trump publicly criticized him: "Cohen also discussed pardons with the President's personal counsel and believed that if he stayed on message, he would get a pardon or the President would do 'something else' to make the investigation end. But after Cohen began cooperating with the government in the summer of 2018, the President publicly criticized him, called him a 'rat', and suggested that his family members had committed crimes".

=== Appendices ===
Four appendices were included in the report:

- Appendix A: Order 3915-2017 from Deputy Attorney General Rod Rosenstein appointing a special counsel to investigate Russian interference in the 2016 United States elections.
- Appendix B: Glossary of terms used in the report containing "names and brief descriptions of individuals and entities referenced in the two volumes of [the] report".
- Appendix C: President Trump's written answers to the special counsel.
- Appendix D: Special counsel's office transferred, referred, and completed cases.

== Events before public release ==
Barr assumed oversight of the investigation on February 14, 2019, after being approved by the Senate and sworn in as Attorney General. Barr had been previously critical of the investigation before Trump announced his intent to nominate Barr for Attorney General on December 7, 2018. Barr's predecessor, Jeff Sessions, resigned on November 7, 2018, writing that it was at Trump's request.

The March 24, 2019 OLC memo justifying Barr's decision to clear Trump that was written in tandem with the Barr letter

The report was submitted by the special counsel to Attorney General William Barr on March 22, 2019. Barr tasked the Office of Legal Counsel (OLC) in the Department of Justice with authoring a memo that would justify the decision Barr had already made to clear Trump of obstruction. The group authored both the memo and Barr letter over in tandem the course of two days; the final memo was signed by Steven Engel and Ed O'Callaghan. Following litigation under the Freedom of Information Act, the Justice Department released the full text of the internal OLC memorandum in August 2022.

=== Barr letter ===
The letter from Attorney General William Barr (known as the Barr letter) on March 24, 2019, to leaders of the House and Senate judiciary committees describing the principal conclusions of the special counsel's investigation

On March 24, 2019, Attorney General Barr sent Congress a four-page letter that purportedly described the special counsel's conclusions regarding Russian interference in the 2016 presidential election and obstruction of justice. Barr relayed two ways in which Russia interfered in the election: firstly, "disinformation and social media operations in the United States designed to sow social discord"; and secondly, hacking computers for emails from the 2016 Clinton presidential campaign and Democratic Party organizations. Barr also quoted the report that the "investigation did not establish that members of the Trump Campaign conspired or coordinated with the Russian government in its election interference activities".

On obstruction of justice, Barr wrote that the special counsel "did not draw a conclusion" on obstruction and that "The Special Counsel's decision to describe the facts of his obstruction investigation without reaching any legal conclusions leaves it to the Attorney General to determine whether the conduct described in the report constitutes a crime". Barr continued: "Deputy Attorney General Rod Rosenstein and I have concluded that the evidence developed during the Special Counsel's investigation is not sufficient to establish that the President committed an obstruction-of-justice offense".

On Barr's decision to clear him on obstruction, Trump said in late April 2019 that Barr read the Mueller report "and he made a decision right on the spot. No obstruction".

After the release of the Barr Letter, media commentators pointed out that in June 2018, prior to joining the Trump administration, Barr sent an unsolicited 19-page memo to the Department of Justice and White House attorneys asserting that Mueller's investigation of President Trump for obstruction is "legally insupportable", and "fatally misconceived". Barr also discussed the memo with some of Trump's attorneys.

==== Mueller's reaction ====
On March 27, 2019, Mueller reportedly wrote to Barr in a letter, as stated in the New York Times "expressing his and his team's concerns that the attorney general had inadequately portrayed their conclusions". This was first reported on April 30, 2019. Mueller thought that the Barr letter "did not fully capture the context, nature, and substance" of the findings of the special counsel investigation that he led. "There is now public confusion about critical aspects of the results of our investigation". Mueller also requested Barr release the Mueller report's introductions and executive summaries. The March 27 Mueller letter made no mention of media coverage.

On March 28, 2019, according to anonymous Justice Department officials, Mueller, in a call to Barr, reportedly expressed concerns about public misunderstandings of the obstruction investigation due to media coverage. On April 30, 2019, a spokeswoman from the Justice Department described the March 28 call between Mueller and Barr: "the Special Counsel emphasized that nothing in the Attorney General's March 24 letter was inaccurate or misleading. But, he expressed frustration over the lack of context and the resulting media coverage regarding the Special Counsel's obstruction analysis". Although they discussed whether more context could be provided via Barr releasing more of the report, Barr "ultimately determined that it would not be productive to release the report in piecemeal fashion".

On March 29, 2019, Barr sent a subsequent letter to Congress in which he said that his March 24 letter was not a summary of the Mueller report, but merely presented the report's principal conclusions. Barr also wrote that he would be volunteering to testify before Congress in early May, which Barr did.

=== Barr testimony of April 9 and 10 ===
On April 9, Attorney General Barr appeared in a congressional hearing before the House. There, Representative Charlie Crist described media reports that "members of the special counsel's team are frustrated at some level with the limited information included in your March 24 letter, that it does not adequately or accurately portray the [Mueller] report's findings". Crist asked Barr: "Do you know what they are referencing with that?", Barr replied: "No, I don't. I think – I think – I suspect that they probably wanted more put out, but in my view, I was not interested in putting out summaries".

On April 10, Attorney General Barr appeared before the Senate Appropriations Committee. Senator Chris Van Hollen asked Barr regarding obstruction: "Did Bob Mueller support your conclusion?" Barr replied: "I don't know whether Bob Mueller supported my conclusion."

=== Barr press conference ===
Attorney General William Barr, accompanied by former Deputy Attorney General Rod Rosenstein, and Ed O'Callaghan, held a press conference discussing the Mueller report and related matters 90 minutes prior to its public release.

On April 18, Attorney General Barr held a press conference discussing the report 90 minutes before it was released to Congress and the public. The press conference discussed redacted portions, and "ten episodes involving the President and discusses potential legal theories for connecting these actions to elements of an obstruction offense."

Barr gave the following elaboration on his decision that the evidence was insufficient to warrant an obstruction of justice charge for Trump: "Although the deputy attorney general [Rod Rosenstein] and I disagreed with some of the special counsel's legal theories and felt that some of the episodes examined did not amount to obstruction as a matter of law, we did not rely solely on that in making our decision. Instead, we accepted the special counsel's legal framework for purposes of our analysis and evaluated the evidence as presented by the special counsel in reaching our conclusion".

Barr also mentioned that Trump's legal team received the redacted version of the report earlier in the week, adding that the president's lawyers "were not permitted to make, and did not request, any redactions". Barr said that the "president confirmed that, in the interests of transparency and full disclosure to the American people, he would not assert privilege over the special counsel's report".

In the press conference, Barr asked that people look into the context, stating that President Trump "faced an unprecedented situation [...] federal agents and prosecutors were scrutinizing his conduct before and after taking office and the conduct of some of his associates. [...] There was relentless speculation in the news media about the President's personal culpability", even though there was, according to Barr, "no collusion". Barr continued that there was "substantial evidence to show that the president was frustrated and angered by a sincere belief that the investigation was undermining his presidency, propelled by his political opponents and fueled by illegal leaks". Also in the press conference, Barr said that he asked Mueller "whether or not [Mueller] was taking the position that he would have found a crime but for the existence of the OLC opinion" that a sitting president cannot be indicted. Barr continued that Mueller "made it very clear, several times, that he was not taking a position – he was not saying but for the OLC opinion he would have found a crime".

Some political commentators, including Chris Wallace of Fox News, observed that Barr appeared to behave more like Trump's defense attorney than as an attorney general during the press conference.

Following the Barr press conference, The New York Times noticed similarities from Barr's 19-page memo to the Justice Department while not working for the government, in which he criticized this investigation for "proposing an unprecedented expansion of obstruction laws" that would result in "grave consequences" for the institution of the presidency. The New York Times continued that Barr had an "untrammeled view of executive power", and that the 2018 Barr memo "turned out to be an accurate road map to Mr. Barr's handling of the Mueller report".

== Public release of redacted report ==
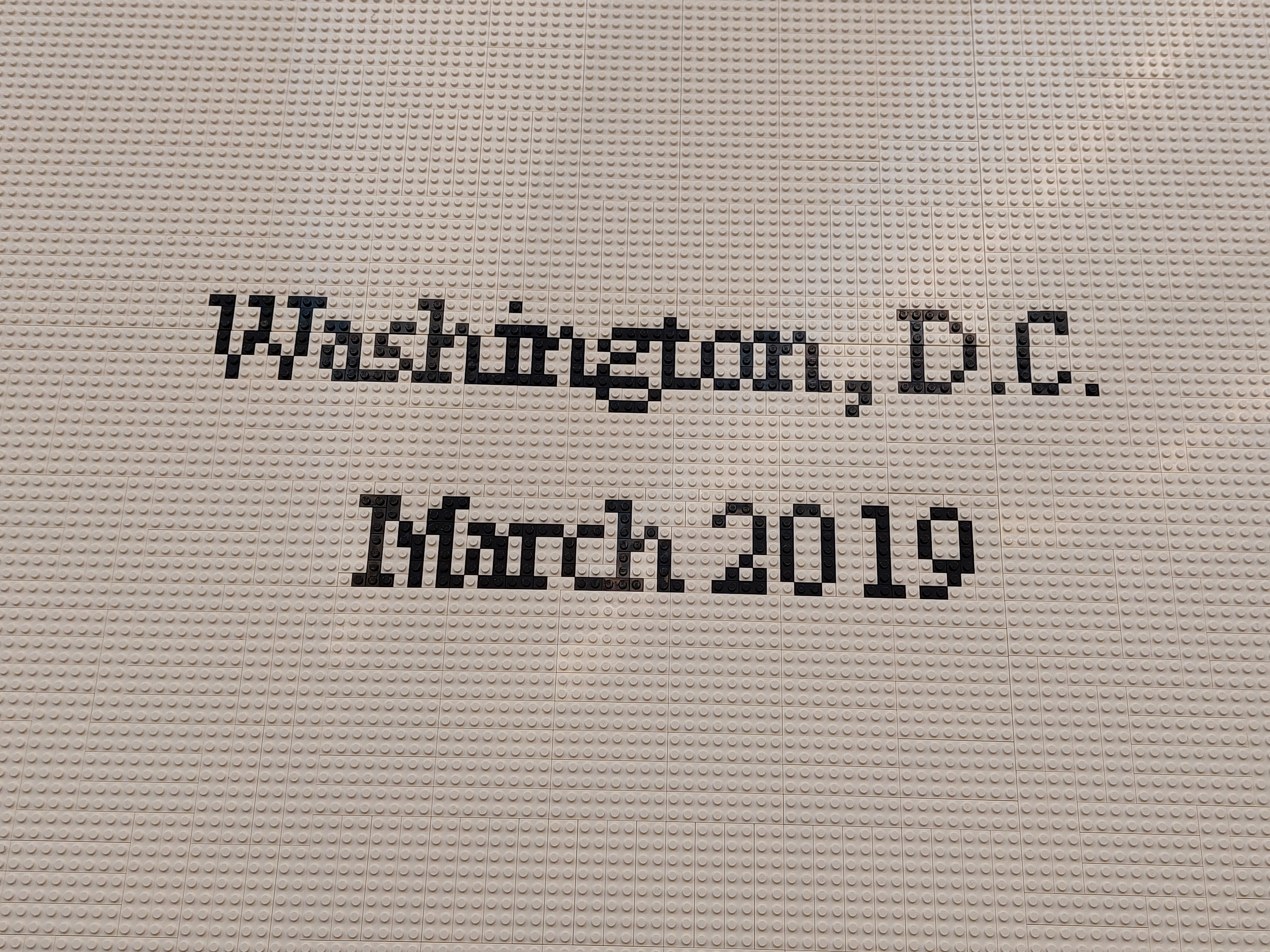
Detail of the front page of the report, as redacted in 2019, reproduced in Lego by Chinese dissident artist Ai Weiwei

On April 18, 2019, a redacted version of the special counsel's report was released to Congress and the public. About one-eighth of the lines are redacted. The report is 448 pages long across two volumes and four appendices. It contains about 200,000 words and over 1,100 footnotes. About 11% of the text is redacted. 40% of the pages had at least one redaction, and there were over 900 redacted text blocks in all.

Barr described the four kinds of redactions in the released report: "harm to ongoing matter" (HOM) in white, "personal privacy" (PP) in green, "investigative technique" (IT) in yellow, and "grand jury" material in red. Of those, only the grand jury redactions are required by law due to 6(e) of United States criminal procedure. Barr characterized the report as being "lightly redacted".

=== Redacted report findings compared to Barr letter ===
After the release of the redacted report, the Barr letter was criticized as a deliberate mischaracterization of the Mueller report and its conclusions. Numerous legal analysts accused Barr of glossing over the report, identifying significant discrepancies between Barr's characterizations of its contents and the report's actual findings, while others called for Barr's resignation. The New York Times reported instances in which the Barr letter omitted information and quoted sentence fragments out of context in ways that significantly altered the findings in the report, including:

- Omission of language that indicated Trump could be subject to indictment after leaving office.
- A sentence fragment described only one possible motive for Trump to obstruct justice, while the Mueller report listed multiple possible motives.
- Omission of words and a full sentence that twice suggested there was knowing and complicit behavior between the Trump campaign and Russians that stopped short of direct coordination, which may constitute conspiracy.

CNN wrote that while Barr in his letter took it upon himself to deliver a ruling on whether Trump had committed obstruction, the redacted report indicates that Mueller intended that decision to be made by Congress, not Barr.

Numerous other political and legal analysts, including Bob Woodward and Brian Williams, observed significant differences in what Barr said about Mueller's findings in his March 24 summary letter, and in his April 18 press conference, compared to what the Mueller report actually found. This commentary included a comparison of Barr to Baghdad Bob, calling him "Baghdad Bill".

Barr wrote that his letter provided "the principal conclusions" of the Mueller report. Ryan Goodman, a professor at the New York University School of Law and co-editor of Just Security, observed that in 1989 Barr also wrote a letter which he stated contained "the principal conclusions" of a controversial legal opinion he worked on as head of the OLC. Barr declined to provide the full opinion to Congress, but it was later subpoenaed and released to the public, showing that the summary letter did not fully disclose the principal conclusions.

=== Redacted report findings compared to Barr press conference ===
In the Barr press conference on April 18, prior to the release of the redacted report, Barr said that "the White House fully cooperated with the Special Counsel's investigation". However, Factcheck.org describes that this was "contradicted in the report", which stated that Trump had attacked the investigation in public, tried to control the investigation in private, and encouraged witnesses not to cooperate both in public and private. Factcheck.org also describes the report as saying that President Trump did not fully cooperate for interview requests by investigators, then in written responses answered that he did not remember to over 30 questions, while other answers were "incomplete or imprecise". Investigators protested that the written responses denied them the opportunity to ask follow-up questions, but Trump denied another request for an interview.

Also the Barr press conference on April 18, Barr said that "Special Counsel Mueller did not indicate that his purpose was to leave the decision [on obstruction by Trump] to Congress". The Washington Post described that "the report does not say Mueller intended to leave obstruction-related decisions to Barr", and instead "uses suggestive language about Congress's role", that Congress can subject President Trump to obstruction laws, and made a reference to not wanting to preempt impeachment.

=== Analysis of redactions ===
Attributes of the report's text, and its redactions in particular, received significant news coverage and was a noted talking point. Redactions were concentrated on areas about Russian government interference in the elections. The four types of redactions had the following statistics:

- "Harm to ongoing matter" – over 400 redactions and about 45% of the redacted text overall.
- "Personal privacy" – an estimated 5–7% of the redactions.
- "Investigative technique" – an estimated 8–10% of the redactions.
- "Grand jury" – over 300 redactions and about 38% of the redacted text overall.

=== Press coverage of the investigation ===
The Associated Press and Slate observed that the Mueller report mostly corroborated press coverage of the investigation. Kyle Pope, editor of the Columbia Journalism Review, remarked that "The media looks a lot stronger today than it did before the release of this report", asserting that Mueller's report absolved the media of its coverage of the investigation, the fairness, accuracy, and objectivity of which was repeatedly derided by President Trump and his allies as "fake news" and a part of a concerted "Witch-Hunt". The Washington Post stated that the report "offered a rich portrait of Trump's efforts as president to undermine the investigation and mislead the public".

The Washington Post reported that while some press reports on the investigation proved wrong, or at least were not confirmed by the Mueller report, "the Mueller report was by and large an affirmation of the mainstream media's investigative reporting. Almost all the big stories were confirmed in the report". Notable reports that were not confirmed to be true by the report included:

- Trump had "directed" Michael Cohen to lie to Congress.
- Cohen was in Prague in 2016.
- Russian Alfa Bank server was communicating with a Trump Organization server.
- Paul Manafort secretly met with Julian Assange.

=== False and misleading public statements by the Trump administration ===
Politifact published a list of eight notable public assertions Trump and his administration made that the Mueller report showed to be false or misleading:

- Mueller had conflicts of interest and was turned down to become FBI director.
- Trump asserted he hadn't thought about firing Mueller.
- Press secretary Sarah Sanders asserted that Trump fired James Comey because "countless" FBI agents told her they had lost faith in him.
- Sanders asserted that a DOJ internal review had prompted Comey's firing.
- Sanders claimed Trump "certainly didn't dictate" a statement by Donald Trump Jr. regarding the Trump Tower meeting.
- Trump asserted that the Steele dossier triggered the initial FBI investigation and the investigation "was a plan by those who lost the election".
- Trump repeatedly asserted, during 2016–2017, that he had no business involvement in Russia.
- Trump claimed Comey sought a dinner with him when actually Trump invited Comey for dinner.

Vox reported that the Mueller report showed Sanders and her predecessor, Sean Spicer, made false statements about the circumstances surrounding the firings of Comey and Michael Flynn.

The Mueller report showed that despite assertions by Hope Hicks and Jason Miller in September 2016 that Carter Page never had any involvement with the campaign, Page actually produced work for the campaign, traveled with Trump to a campaign speech and "Chief policy adviser Sam Clovis expressed appreciation for Page's work and praised his work to other Campaign officials".

=== Other findings ===
The Mueller report devoted over a dozen pages to refute an argument made by Trump's attorneys, and by Barr before he joined the Trump administration, that it was impossible for Trump to obstruct the investigation, regardless of his intentions, due to his presidential authority to oversee federal law enforcement – an interpretation that some legal scholars characterized as dubious because it suggests a president is above the law.

The report confirmed significant aspects of reporting, primarily by The Wall Street Journal, of efforts by Republican activist Peter Smith to locate deleted Clinton emails, including his communications about it with Michael Flynn and campaign co-chair Sam Clovis, as well as Flynn's actions to spearhead the effort at Trump's repeated requests. In at least one email to an undisclosed list of recipients, Smith claimed to know WikiLeak's schedule about releasing the Clinton emails, writing there was a "tug-of-war going on within WikiLeaks over its planned releases in the next few days", and that WikiLeaks "has maintained that it will save its best revelations for last, under the theory this allows little time for response prior to the U.S. election November 8."

The report confirmed significant parts of reporting regarding a January 2017 meeting in Seychelles between Erik Prince, George Nader, and Putin confidant Kirill Dmitriev, among others. Despite Prince's prior congressional testimony that he had no role in the Trump campaign or transition, the report found that Nader had represented Prince to Dmitriev as "designated by Steve [Bannon] to meet you! I know him and he is very very well connected and trusted by the New Team". The Mueller Report stated, "According to Nader, Prince had led him to believe that Bannon was aware of Prince's upcoming meeting with Dmitriev, and Prince acknowledged that it was fair for Nader to think that Prince would pass information on to the Transition Team. Bannon, however, told the Office that Prince did not tell him in advance about his meeting with Dmitriev". Prince testified to the House Intelligence Committee that "I didn't fly there to meet any Russian guy", although the Mueller Report found that he and Nader made significant preparations to meet Dmitriev. Although Prince had previously characterized a second meeting between him and Dmitriev in a bar as a chance encounter of no consequence, the Mueller report found the meeting was actually pre-arranged after Prince had learned from communications back home that Russia had positioned an aircraft carrier off Libya and he wanted to convey that the United States would not accept any Russian involvement in Libya. House Intelligence Committee chairman Adam Schiff announced on April 30, 2019, that he was sending a criminal referral to the Justice Department alleging Prince had provided false testimony to the committee.

The special counsel sought to interview Trump for more than a year, advising his attorneys that "it is in the interest of the Presidency and the public for an interview to take place" and offering "numerous accommodations to aid the President's preparation and avoid surprise". Trump's attorneys resisted these requests, which the special counsel accepted written responses to questions. The Mueller report stated that Trump asserted more than thirty times that he could not remember information that had been asked, and that other answers were "incomplete or imprecise". Trump did not provide written responses to questions relating to obstruction of justice or events during the transition. The special counsel considered subpoenaing Trump's testimony but decided against it because it would likely result in protracted constitutional litigation that would delay conclusion of the investigation, and because investigators had by then acquired information they sought by other means.

The Mueller report elaborated on earlier reporting regarding communications between Felix Sater and Michael Cohen during 2015–2016 to pursue construction of Trump Tower Moscow, at a time Trump denied any business involvement in Russia. The report found that Sater, a former Trump business associate, asserted to Cohen that he had Russian contacts who could gain Vladimir Putin's support for the project, adding "I think I can get Putin to [praise Trump's business acumen] at the Trump Moscow press conference", and "We can own this election. Michael my next steps are very sensitive with Putin's very very close people, we can pull this off". The report also found that Cohen had discussed particulars of the project with Ivanka Trump and Donald Trump Jr. The report states, "According to Cohen, he did not consider the political import of the Trump Moscow project to the 2016 U.S. presidential election at the time. Cohen also did not recall candidate Trump or anyone affiliated with the Trump Campaign discussing the political implications of the Trump Tower Moscow project with him. However, Cohen recalled conversations with Trump in which the candidate suggested that his campaign would be a significant 'infomercial' for Trump-branded properties".

The Mueller report did not investigate or conclude Cohen had been in Prague, as had been alleged in the Steele dossier and reported by the McClatchy Company. It only cited Cohen's denial to investigators.

=== Book editions ===
The report was issued as a printed book by three publishers, and collated an aggregate 357,000 sales as of June 2019, making it a New York Times bestseller.

== Reactions ==
=== President Donald Trump ===
Trump has vacillated in his view of the report, initially saying, "The Mueller report was great. It could not have been better," then one month later characterizing it as a "total 'hit job'", then one month later as "a beautiful report".

The Mueller report reported that Donald Trump's campaign staff, administration officials, and family members, his Republican backers, and his associates lied or made false assertions, whether intentional or unintentional, to the public, Congress, and authorities.

President Trump's reaction to the Mueller report

Upon the release of the redacted report on April 18, Trump commented:

It was called, "No collusion. No obstruction." I'm having a good day. There never was, by the way, and there never will be. And we do have to get to the bottom of these things, I will say. [...] This should never happen to another president again, this hoax. (Note: Full relevant remarks: "I also want to thank two great congressmen for being here, and if we had room we would've had a lot more: Phil Roe and James Baird. Thank you very much." (Applause.) "Thank you, fellas. You're welcome. And they're having a good day – I'm having a good day, too." (Laughter.) "It was called, 'No collusion. No obstruction.'" (Applause.) "I'm having a good day. There never was, by the way, and there never will be. And we do have to get to the bottom of these things, I will say. And this should never happen – I say this in front of my friends, Wounded Warriors; and I just call them 'warriors', 'cause we just shook hands, and they look great; they look so good, so beautiful. But I say it in front of my friends: This should never happen to another president again, this hoax. It should never happen to another president again. Thank you.")

President Trump sent several tweets about the news, including one that mimicked promotional material for the television series Game of Thrones, featuring Trump turning his back, surrounded in mist, superimposed with the words "No collusion. No obstruction. For the haters and the radical left Democrats – Game Over." HBO, owners of the rights to the series, commented that they "prefer our intellectual property not be used for political purposes". Trump had posted similar pictures on Twitter and Instagram on previous occasions, which HBO had chided.

On April 19, Trump labeled the report "crazy", saying that some of the report's assertions about him were "total bullshit" and "fabricated and totally untrue". Calling for a new counter-investigation, he tweeted: "It is now finally time to turn the tables and bring justice to some very sick and dangerous people who have committed very serious crimes, perhaps even Spying or Treason." (Note: Full tweets: "Statements are made about me by certain people in the Crazy Mueller Report, in itself written by 18 Angry Democrat Trump Haters, which are fabricated & totally untrue. Watch out for people that take so-called 'notes', when the notes never existed until needed. Because I never agreed to testify, it was not necessary for me to respond to statements made in the 'Report' about me, some of which are total bullshit & only given to make the other person look good (or me to look bad). This was an Illegally Started Hoax that never should have happened, a big, fat, [sic] waste of time, energy and money – $30,000,000 to be exact. It is now finally time to turn the tables and bring justice to some very sick and dangerous people who have committed very serious crimes, perhaps even Spying or Treason. This should never happen again!") He posted similar tweets in the following days.

On April 23, Trump said of the investigation, "I don't believe our country should allow this ever to happen again. This will never happen again. We cannot let it ever happen again." He went on to insinuate that "treasonous acts" were performed against him from "very high up" in the Obama administration. (Note: Full remarks: Reporter #1: "Some Democrats, sir, are still talking about impeachment. What's your response to that?" Trump: "I don't think they're talking about impeachment. We have the greatest economy we've ever had, our country's in incredible shape. They and others created a fraud on our country with this ridiculous witch hunt, where it was proven very strongly, 'No collusion. No obstruction. No nothing.' We are doing so well, we've never, probably, had a time of prosperity like this. It's been great." (To a reporter:) "Go ahead." Reporter #2: "Sir, do you think the people who launched the investigation into your campaign [are guilty] of treasonous acts?" Trump: "Yeah." Reporter #2: "How high up do you think it went?" Trump: "I think it went very high up. I think what happened is a disgrace. I don't believe our country should allow this ever to happen again. This will never happen again. We cannot let it ever happen again. It went very high up, and it started fairly low, but with instructions from the high-up. This should never happen to a president again. We can't allow that to take place." Reporter #2: "Do you think it reached the West Wing of the Obama White House?" Trump: "I don't want to say that, but I think you know the answer." Reporter #3: "Mr. President, the report says while you did not commit a crime, it says that you specifically – " Trump: "Who said what?" Reporter #3: "While the Mueller report says, according to the Barr letter, while you didn't – " Trump: "The Mueller report was great. It could not have been better. It said, 'No obstruction. No collusion.' It could not have been better.")

On April 24, Trump attacked the report's writers as "Angry Democrats and Trump Haters", tweeting: "If the partisan Dems ever tried to Impeach, I would first head to the U.S. Supreme Court." Legal experts responded that Trump had misunderstood the Constitution, as impeachment is constitutionally within Congress' abilities and responsibilities and not the within that of the courts. (Note: Full tweet: "The Mueller Report, despite being written by Angry Democrats and Trump Haters, and with unlimited money behind it ($35,000,000), didn't lay a glove on me. I DID NOTHING WRONG. If the partisan Dems ever tried to Impeach, I would first head to the U.S. Supreme Court. Not only are there no 'High Crimes and Misdemeanors', there are no Crimes by me at all. All of the Crimes were committed by Crooked Hillary, the Dems, the DNC and Dirty Cops – and we caught them in the act! We waited for Mueller and WON, so now the Dems look to Congress as last hope!")

On April 25, Trump denied the report's claim that he ordered former White House Counsel Don McGahn to fire Mueller. He tweeted:

As has been incorrectly reported by the Fake News Media, I never told then White House Counsel Don McGahn to fire Robert Mueller, even though I had the legal right to do so. If I wanted to fire Mueller, I didn't need McGahn to do it, I could have done it myself. Nevertheless, Mueller was NOT fired and was respectfully allowed to finish his work on what I, and many others, say was an illegal investigation (there was no crime), headed by a Trump hater who was highly conflicted, and a group of 18 VERY ANGRY Democrats. DRAIN THE SWAMP!

On April 26, speaking to the National Rifle Association of America (NRA), Trump said, "They tried for a coup; didn't work out so well. And I didn't need a gun for that one, did I? All was taking place at the highest levels in Washington, D.C. […] Corruption at the highest level. A disgrace. Spying, surveillance, trying for an overthrow – and we caught 'em, we caught 'em. Who would have thought in our country? But it's called […] 'draining the swamp'." (Note: Full relevant remarks: "Every day of my administration we are taking power out of Washington, D.C., and returning it to the American people where it belongs. And you see it now better than ever with all of the resignations of bad apples – they're bad apples! They tried for a coup; didn't work out so well. And I didn't need a gun for that one, did I? All was taking place at the highest levels in Washington, D.C. You've been watching, you've been seeing, you've been looking at things that you wouldn't've believed possible in our country. Corruption at the highest level. A disgrace. Spying, surveillance, trying for an overthrow – and we caught 'em, we caught 'em. Who would have thought in our country? But it's called – what we all together have done; it started two and a half years ago on that great November 8th. That was a great day! Remember that day? Great day. And in a year and a half we have one called 'November 3rd'. It's November 3rd this time. Get ready to vote! You'd better. You'd better get ready to vote. But it's all called 'draining the swamp'. And we are doing it faster than anyone ever thought possible. Very proud of it.")

On May 29, Trump said regarding the report "The Mueller report came out: no obstruction, no collusion, no nothing. It's a beautiful report." The next day Trump made a similar remark about Mueller's report saying "There's no obstruction, there's no collusion, there's no nothing. It's nothing but a witch hunt. A witch hunt by the media and the Democrats, they're partners."

With Mueller set to testify to Congress about his report in July 2019, Trump falsely claimed in June 2019 that Mueller had illegally deleted communication records between Peter Strzok and Lisa Page (there were lost records which were later retrieved, but there is no indication Mueller was involved in processes on this matter). Trump declared in early July 2019 that Mueller "must" restrict his testimony to "the report". In late July 2019, Trump said that Mueller's testifying would be "bad" for Mueller. With Mueller's aide Aaron Zebley also about to testify to Congress, Trump criticized Zebley, characterizing him as a "Never Trumper lawyer" (Zebley has never donated to any political party). Trump also criticized Zebley for his role in private law practice representing Bill Cooper, who had connections to Bill and Hillary Clinton regarding her emails.

==== White House interaction with Don McGahn ====
The Wall Street Journal reported on May 10, 2019, that within a day of the release of the Mueller report, Trump sought to have McGahn declare that he didn't think the president's directive to have Mueller fired constituted obstruction of justice, but McGahn refused.

On May 10, 2019, The New York Times reported that the White House, in April and/or May, asked McGahn twice to declare that Trump never obstructed justice. "His reluctance angered the president, who believed that Mr. McGahn showed disloyalty by telling investigators for the special counsel, Robert S. Mueller III, about Mr. Trump's attempts to maintain control over the Russia investigation," the New York Times notes. One request was sent to McGahn's lawyer, William A. Burck, before the report was made public but after Trump's lawyers received a copy. Trump's lawyers noticed that Mueller left out McGahn's belief that Trump never obstructed justice. Responding to the first request; "We did not perceive it as any kind of threat or something sinister," Burck replied in a statement. "It was a request, professionally and cordially made." After the Mueller report was released, McGahn passed on the opportunity on putting out the statement. The White House tried once more and asked McGahn to publish the statement. McGahn declined.

==== September 2019 ====
On September 30, 2019, The New York Times reported that two American officials stated that President Trump told Australian Prime Minister, Scott Morrison, to help Attorney General William Barr in a Justice Department inquiry, that, according to The New York Times, Trump hopes will discredit the Mueller investigation and validate his 2016 victory. The White House curbed access to the transcript of the phone call, allegedly done by the request of Barr, however only allowing a small group of aides access. The White House responded by dismissing the reports, claiming that it was part of a routine request to grant Australian authorities access to Department of Justice resources to facilitate an investigation that had been open for several months.

=== Trump's personal lawyers ===
Trump's lawyers said in a statement: "After a 17-month investigation, testimony from some 500 witnesses, the issuance of 2,800 subpoenas, the execution of nearly 500 search warrants, early morning raids, the examination of more than 1.4 million pages of documents, and the unprecedented cooperation of the President, it is clear there was no criminal wrongdoing...This vindication of the President is an important step forward for the country and a strong reminder that this type of abuse must never be permitted to occur again."

It has been reported since July 2018, that Trump's personal lawyers are creating a "counter report" to contest the special counsel's findings on obstruction of justice. As of April 2019, according to Rudy Giuliani, they are finalizing the report and putting finishing touches. Giuliani has said that the counter report is about 45 pages long and consists of two sections. Giuliani told The Daily Beast in an interview that the contents were: the legitimacy of the Special Counsel investigation due to alleged conflict of interests surrounding Mueller, and alleged coordination between the Trump Campaign and Russia including obstruction of justice. Originally, according to Trump, the counter report was 87 pages long: "It has been incorrectly reported that Rudy Giuliani and others will not be doing a counter to the Mueller report. That is Fake News. (Note: President Trump was referring to an article in The Atlantic, titled "The White House Has No Plan for Confronting the Mueller Report", published on December 6, 2018.) Already 87 pages done, but obviously cannot complete until we see the final Witch Hunt Report".

Since the public release of the Mueller report, Giuliani has suggested that they might not release the report for now: "There's probably a point at which we will use it. Right now we think the public debate is playing out about as well as it can. Why confuse it – it raises a lot of issues that maybe we didn't have to respond to", Giuliani said.

On April 21, Giuliani said the special counsel's team "came close to torturing people", and described a lawyer on the special counsel's team as a "hitman". Giuliani also stated: "There's nothing wrong with taking information from Russians. It depends on where it came from". Also on April 21, Giuliani falsely stated that "nothing was denied" by the Trump administration to investigators (FactCheck.org notes that the report stated Trump refused interviews). Giuliani additionally falsely stated that "you read that" Don McGahn "gave three different versions" of his conversation with Trump regarding firing Mueller (FactCheck.org also notes that the report stated McGahn only gave one version, and that Trump gave another version).

Trump attorney Emmet Flood mocked the Mueller report as "part 'truth commission' report and part law school exam paper".

=== Former Deputy Attorney General Rod Rosenstein ===
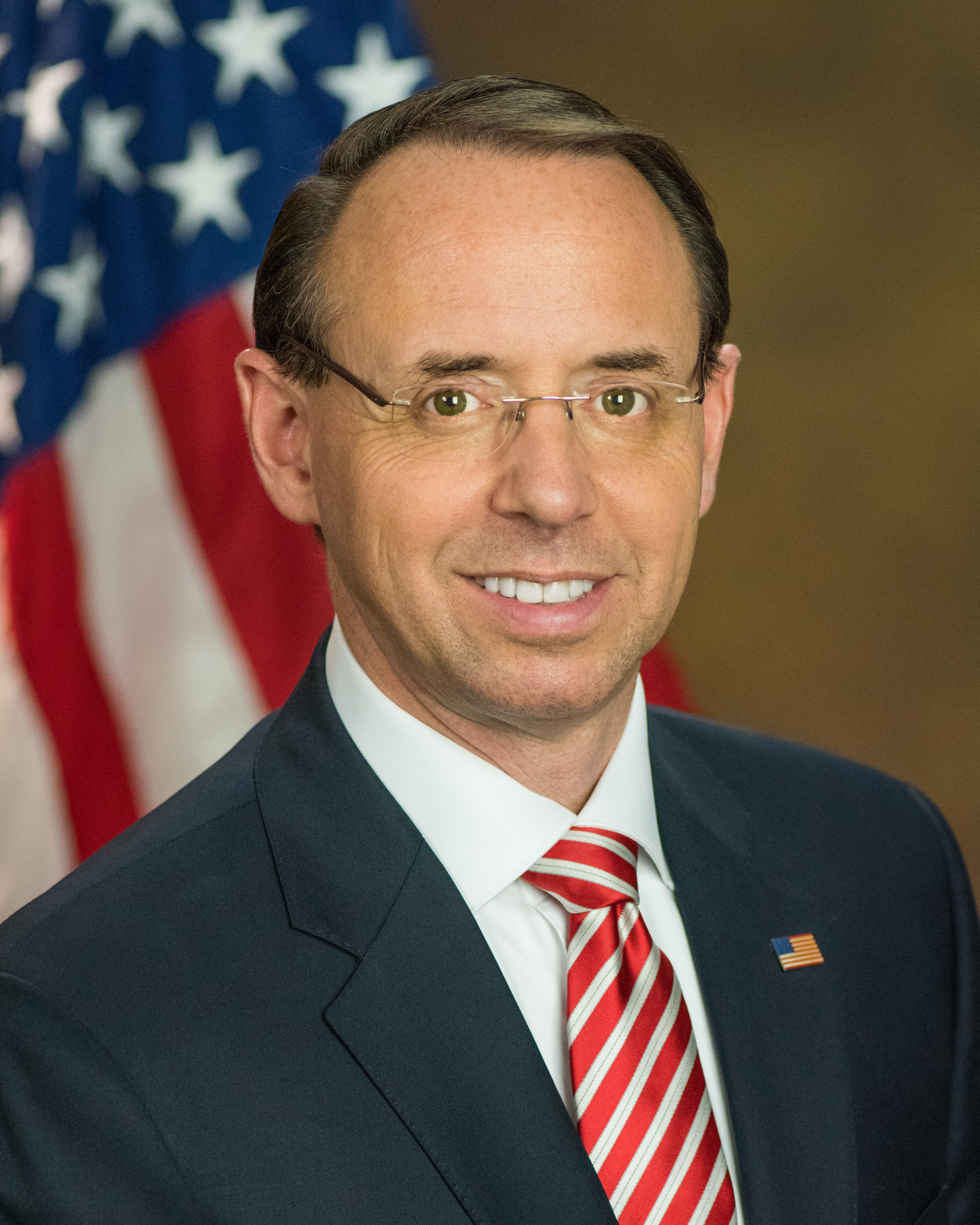
Former Deputy Attorney General Rod Rosenstein

On April 11, 2019, in his first interview since the conclusion of the Special Counsel he appointed, with The Wall Street Journal, Rosenstein defended Attorney General Barr's handling of the conclusions of the Special Counsel investigation. "He's being as forthcoming as he can, and so this notion that he's trying to mislead people, I think is just completely bizarre", Rosenstein said. Rosenstein also supported Barr's four-page letter by saying: "It would be one thing if you put out a letter and said, 'I'm not going to give you the report.'" What he said is, 'Look, it's going to take a while to process the report. In the meantime, people really want to know what's in it. I'm going to give you the top-line conclusions.' That's all he was trying to do".

On April 25, 2019, Rosenstein spoke at the Armenian Bar Association's Public Servants Dinner in New York City. Rosenstein said that as a result of the investigation, there was now "overwhelming evidence that Russian operatives hacked American computers and defrauded American citizens, and that is only the tip of the iceberg of a comprehensive Russian strategy to influence elections, promote social discord, and undermine America, just like they do in many other countries [...] our nation is safer, elections are more secure, and citizens are better informed about covert foreign influence schemes."

Rosenstein discussed the result of the special counsel investigation, saying that he did agree to oversee it correctly and to its completion, but: "I did not promise to report all results to the public, because grand jury investigations are ex parte proceedings. It is not our job to render conclusive factual findings. We just decide whether it is appropriate to file criminal charges". However, according to Rosenstein, "not everybody was happy with [his] decision", as he went on to cite politicians who "need to evaluate everything in terms of the immediate political impact", and the media. Rosenstein reserved particular criticism for the media as "mercenary critics" who "launch ad hominem attacks unrestricted by truth or morality. They make threats, spread fake stories, and even attack your relatives. [...] A republic that endures is not governed by the news cycle. Some of the nonsense that passes for breaking news today would not be worth the paper was printed on, if anybody bothered to print it." Rosenstein further said: "In politics – as in journalism – the rules of evidence do not apply."

Rosenstein criticized the Obama administration for failing to "publicize the full story" about the methods and the "broader strategy" of Russian interference in the American elections. Rosenstein also criticized members of the FBI for disclosing classified material, and criticized James Comey's conduct for announcing the counterintelligence investigation while Comey was still FBI Director and alleging that "the president pressured [Comey] to close the investigation" after Comey was fired.

On April 4, 2021, Rod Rosenstein was interviewed on Kim Wehle's podcast #SimplePolitics. Rosenstein pushed back on the idea that the investigation was a "witch hunt": "From my perspective, it was not a witch hunt. It was never a witch hunt. Bob Mueller doesn't do witch hunts," he said. "That was the criticism that came from the Right during the investigation, but I don't believe that's fair in the way the investigation was conducted."

=== Former Special Counsel Robert Mueller ===
After the Special Counsel concluded its investigation on March 22, Barr sent Congress a four-page letter about the Special Counsel's conclusions on March 24. On April 30, it was reported Mueller sent a letter to Barr on March 27, that expressed concerns about his four-page letter to Congress. Barr called Mueller to discuss about the letter and its contents.

"The summary letter the Department sent to Congress and released to the public late in the afternoon of March 24 did not fully capture the context, nature, and substance of this office's work and conclusions", Mueller said in his letter to Barr. "There is now public confusion about critical aspects of the results of our investigation. This threatens to undermine a central purpose for which the Department appointed the Special Counsel: to assure full public confidence in the outcome of the investigations".

==== Barr's response to Mueller remarks ====
On May 30, 2019, CBS This Morning tweeted a clip from an interview with Attorney General William Barr discussing his thoughts on Mueller's remarks on May 29. "The opinion says you cannot indict a president while he's in office. But he [Mueller] could've reached a decision as to whether it was criminal activity." Barr explained why the Mueller report did not determine whether Trump committed obstruction of justice: "the Deputy attorney General, Rod Rosenstein, and I felt it was necessary for us, as the heads of the department, to reach that decision." When asked about whether Mueller was insinuating that Congress could be the other venue for reaching a conclusion on obstruction of justice, Barr replied by saying "Well, I'm not sure what he was suggesting, but, you know, the Department of Justice doesn't use our powers of investigating crimes as an adjunct to Congress."

==== Mueller's statement on May 29 ====
On May 29, 2019, Robert Mueller made statements before the public on his work as special counsel and the contents of his former office's report.

Upon announcing the formal closure of the Office of the Special Counsel and his resignation from the Justice Department on May 29, 2019, Mueller said "the report is my testimony" and indicated he would have nothing to say that wasn't already in the report. He commented, "If we had had confidence that the president clearly did not commit a crime, we would have said so. We did not, however, make a determination as to whether the president did commit a crime". "The introduction to the volume two of our report explains that decision. It explains that under longstanding department policy, a present president cannot be charged with a federal crime while he is in office". Also, "it would be unfair to potentially accuse somebody of a crime when there can be no court resolution of the actual charge". He said that, according to the Constitution, any potential wrongdoing by a president must be addressed by a "process other than the criminal justice system". This hinted that Congress could now pick up the investigation or start impeachment proceedings. Additionally, Mueller stressed that the central conclusion of his investigation was "that there were multiple, systematic efforts to interfere in our election. That allegation deserves the attention of every American".

==== Mueller's testimony on July 24 ====
Mueller testified before Congress on July 24, 2019, answering questions asked by Representatives. Democrat Ted Lieu asked Mueller whether the reason he did not indict Trump was that Department of Justice policy prohibits the indictment of sitting presidents. Mueller originally confirmed that this was the reason. However, later that day, Mueller corrected his comments, stating that his team did not determine whether Trump committed a crime. Additionally, Mueller answered Republican Ken Buck that a president could be charged with obstruction of justice (or other crimes) after the president left office.

Mueller testified that Trump's written responses to questions from investigators were "generally" untruthful and incomplete.

Stephan Roh, who says he represents Joseph Mifsud, told The Washington Post that Mifsud was actually a "Western intelligence element". Papadopoulos and some critics of the Russia investigation have asserted Mifsud was instructed to entrap Papadopoulos in order to justify the investigation. During Mueller's testimony, Republicans Jim Jordan and Devin Nunes sought to portray Mifsud as a central figure in what they asserted was an investigation initiated on false and politically motivated premises, while Democrats characterized their assertion as a diversion and conspiracy theory. Mueller declined to address the matter as the origin of the investigation was then the subject of a DOJ inquiry.

=== Other Justice Department officials ===
On April 25, The Washington Post published a report quoting an anonymous "senior Justice Department official". The official said that the "special counsel never decided whether [obstruction of justice] is a prosecutable case [against Trump], so there's no conflict between the attorney general's decision that it's not [prosecutable] and the special counsel's report". Regarding obstruction of justice, the official said: "All the attorney general was deciding was whether this was a prosecutable offense, and we don't bring criminal charges at the department unless we believe we can prove them beyond a reasonable doubt to a jury". Regarding the President's efforts to curtail the Special Counsel investigation in the episode involving Corey Lewandowski, the official said it would be hard to justify a prosecution because the obstruction relies on multiple people in a chain all doing something" and that it was "a very attenuated chain", exacerbated "given that the note isn't even an order". The official alluded to the belief that prosecutors would not be able to prove that Trump had wanted to shut down the investigation with corrupt intent, because according to the official, there was no underlying crime to cover up.

=== James Comey ===
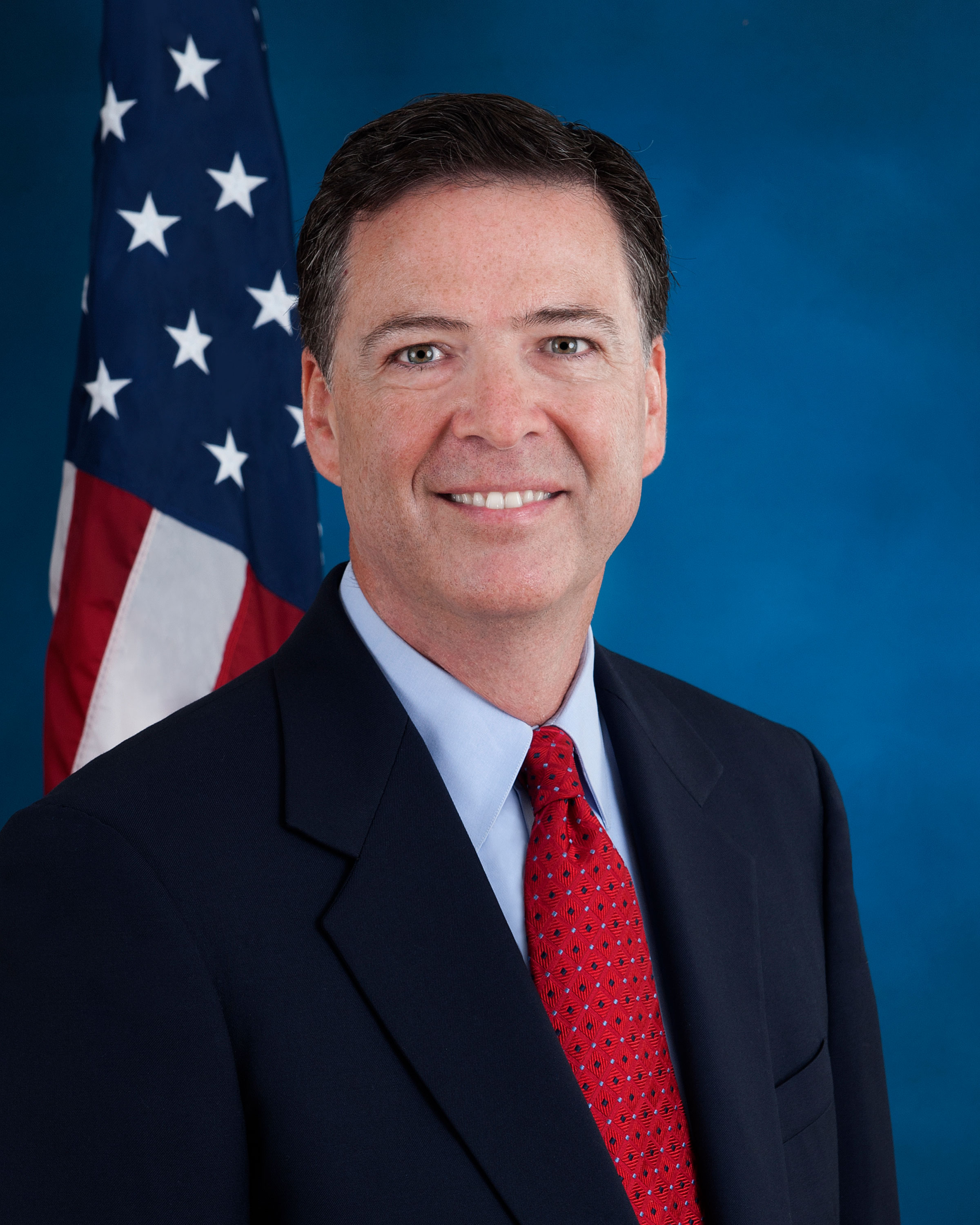
Former FBI Director James Comey

On May 1, 2019, James Comey wrote an opinion piece for The New York Times, in which he wrote about his thoughts on President Trump, Attorney General William Barr, Deputy Attorney General Rod Rosenstein, among others:

Amoral leaders have a way of revealing the character of those around them. Sometimes what they reveal is inspiring. For example, James Mattis, the former secretary of defense, resigned over principle, a concept so alien to Mr. Trump that it took days for the president to realize what had happened, before he could start lying about the man. But more often, proximity to an amoral leader reveals something depressing. I think that's at least part of what we've seen with Bill Barr and Rod Rosenstein. Accomplished people lacking inner strength can't resist the compromises necessary to survive Mr. Trump and that adds up to something they will never recover from. It takes character like Mr. Mattis's to avoid the damage, because Mr. Trump eats your soul in small bites.

On May 8, 2019, in an interview with CBS This Morning, James Comey called Attorney General William Barr's four-page-letter to Congress summarizing the report "misleading" and "inadequate". "It certainly gave the impression that Bob Mueller had decided that he was not going to rule on this question of obstruction of justice when that's not what Mueller did. Mueller laid it out and signaled to a future prosecutor after this individual is out of office you ought to take a serious look at charging him," Comey said. Comey also talked about the ten episodes of alleged obstruction of justice detailed within the report "deeply concerning" to him.

On May 10, 2019, Comey participated in a CNN town hall event with Anderson Cooper. Cooper asked about Comey's thoughts on Barr's handling of the report and related matters. "I think he acted in a way that's less than honorable in the way he described it in writing and described it during a press conference, and continues to talk as if he's the president's lawyer. That is not the attorney general's job," Comey said. "It doesn't make me happy to say this, but I think he has lost most of his reputation with the way he's conducted himself," Comey continued. Comey also commented about Deputy Attorney General Rod Rosenstein. Comey called Rosenstein "a man of accomplishment but not of strong character," reports CNN. Comey also slammed Rosenstein's comments about Trump's respect for the rule of law. Comey also said that if Trump were not president, he would be charged.

==== Rosenstein's response to Comey comments ====
On May 13, 2019, Rod Rosenstein fired back at Comey's remarks in front of the Greater Baltimore Committee (GBC). "Now, the former director is a partisan pundit, selling books and earning speaking fees while speculating about the strength of my character and the fate of my immortal soul," Rosenstein said. "That is disappointing. Speculating about souls is not a job for police and prosecutors. Generally, we base our opinions on eyewitness testimony." Rosenstein also commented on why Comey deserved to be fired and Comey's handling of the Hillary Clinton email investigation in 2016. Gregg Re of Fox News reported Rosenstein's remarks: "'The clearest mistake was the director's decision to hold a press conference about an open case, reveal his recommendation and discuss details about the investigation, without the consent of the prosecutors and the attorney general,' Rosenstein said. 'Then, he chose to send a letter to the Congress on the eve of the election stating that one of the candidates was under criminal investigation, expecting it to be released immediately to the public.' Rosenstein added 'Those actions were not within the range of reasonable decisions. They were inconsistent with our goal of communicating to all FBI employees that they should respect the attorney general's role, refrain from disclosing information about criminal investigations, avoid disparaging uncharged persons, and above all, not take unnecessary steps that could influence an election.'"

=== Democrats ===
Congressional Democratic leaders called on Mueller to publicly testify before Congress, renewing demands for the entire report to be released and raising concern over the President's conduct detailed in the report. House Judiciary Committee chairman Jerry Nadler announced he would issue a subpoena for the full report after the Justice Department released a redacted version. Democrats also criticized what they say were "orchestrated attempts" by the Trump administration to control the narrative surrounding the report's April 18 release. Nadler issued the subpoena on April 19. A DOJ spokesperson called Nadler's subpoena "premature and unnecessary", citing that the publicly released version of the report had "minimal redactions" and that Barr had already made arrangements for Nadler and other lawmakers to review a version with fewer redactions.

On the May 1 deadline of the subpoena, the DOJ rejected it as "not legitimate oversight" and that "the requests in the subpoena are overbroad and extraordinarily burdensome", adding that grand jury material cannot be released without a court order. The House Intelligence Committee subpoenaed the full report on May 8. Some Democrats suggested the possibility that refusing to comply with subpoenas could result in the Democratic-controlled House declaring inherent contempt to garnish the incomes of or even jail individuals who did not comply. On May 22, 2019, the Justice Department agreed to share some counterintelligence and foreign intelligence with the Intelligence Committee, causing chairman Schiff to cancel a scheduled meeting for Democrats to vote on "enforcement action" against the Justice department.

House Speaker Nancy Pelosi and Senate Minority Leader Chuck Schumer released a joint statement saying "Special Counsel Mueller's report paints a disturbing picture of a president who has been weaving a web of deceit, lies, and improper behavior and acting as if the law doesn't apply to him". Senate Minority Whip Dick Durbin stated "The Special Counsel's findings paint a very different picture than what the President and his Attorney General would have the American people believe", and called the details of the Russian contacts with the Trump campaign and Trump's efforts to impede the investigation "troubling".

Massachusetts Senator and former 2020 United States presidential election candidate Elizabeth Warren, citing the "severity" of the "misconduct" detailed in the report, called for the House to initiate impeachment proceedings against Trump, the first 2020 election candidate to do so post-report. New Jersey Senator Cory Booker, also a former 2020 presidential candidate, called for the full release of the report, stating in an earlier tweet: "The American people deserve the truth. Not spin from a Trump appointee. Release Mueller's full report now".

=== Republicans ===
Most Republican lawmakers had no immediate comments on the report due to the report coming out during Congress' spring recess. House Republican leaders viewed the report as vindication of President Trump and signaled that lawmakers should move on. On April 18, House Minority Leader Kevin McCarthy stated "Nothing we saw today changes the underlying results of the 22-month-long Mueller investigation that ultimately found no collusion". House Minority Whip Steve Scalise tweeted "Democrats owe the American people an apology", along with a statement declaring the probe to be dead. Ohio Representative Jim Jordan, the Ranking Member on the House Oversight Committee, stated "They do want people who launched this investigation, on a false premise, they do want them held accountable", referring to retaliatory sentiment among Trump supporters about the origin of the Russia investigation and the Steele dossier. "You can't have the FBI using one party's opposition research document to launch an investigation and spy on the other party's campaign. We know that took place and we do need to get to the bottom of that because it's never supposed to happen in this country", Jordan added. However, the House Intelligence Committee, then controlled by Republicans, released in 2017 a report that stated that the Russia investigation had not started from information in the Steele dossier, but from information that the FBI received on George Papadopoulos.

On April 19, Utah Senator Mitt Romney wrote in a statement on Twitter that he was "sickened" and "appalled" by the findings in the report, and said reading the report was a "sobering revelation of how far we have strayed from the aspirations and the principles of the founders". Romney later expounded on his comments in a press release by saying "It is good news that there was insufficient evidence to charge the President of the United States with having conspired with a foreign adversary or with having obstructed justice. The alternative would have taken us through a wrenching process with the potential for constitutional crisis. The business of government can move on."

On April 28, Senator Lindsey Graham, head of the Senate Judiciary Committee, said on Face the Nation; "I don't care what they talked about. He didn't do anything. The point is the president did not impede Mueller from doing his investigation...I don't care what happened between him and Don McGahn", Graham continued: "Here's what I care about: Was Mueller allowed to do his job? And the answer is yes". On May 1, Graham falsely stated that on "obstruction of justice, Mr. Mueller left it to Mr. Barr to decide after two years, and all this time. He said, 'Mr. Barr, you decide'". Mueller did not ask Barr to make the decision, and Barr later said that he had not talked directly to Mueller about making that decision. Graham also falsely stated that the special counsel investigation "concluded there was no collusion", when collusion was not addressed in the report but criminal conspiracy was.

Republican congressman Justin Amash stated in May 2019 that he concluded from the Mueller report that Trump engaged in impeachable conduct and "it is clear that Barr intended to mislead the public about Special Counsel Robert Mueller's analysis and findings," adding, "Barr's misrepresentations are significant but often subtle, frequently taking the form of sleight-of-hand qualifications or logical fallacies, which he hopes people will not notice."

=== Former federal prosecutors ===
In early May 2019, more than 1,000 former federal prosecutors who had served under both Republican and Democratic administrations published a statement entitled "Statement by Former Federal Prosecutors" on Medium. They declared:

Each of us believes that the conduct of President Trump described in Special Counsel Robert Mueller's report would, in the case of any other person not covered by the Office of Legal Counsel policy against indicting a sitting President, result in multiple felony charges for obstruction of justice.

The former prosecutors found three types of acts described in the Mueller report which "satisfy all of the elements for an obstruction charge":

- "The President's efforts to fire Mueller and to falsify evidence about that effort" – referencing the episodes of Volume II section E and Volume II section I
- "The President's efforts to limit the scope of Mueller's investigation to exclude his conduct" – referencing the episodes of Volume II section H and Volume II section F
- "The President's efforts to prevent witnesses from cooperating with investigators probing him and his campaign" – referencing the episodes of Volume II section K and Volume II section J

The effort was organized by the nonpartisan, nonprofit organization Protect Democracy, a sister organization of United to Protect Democracy.

On May 30, 2019, a video hosted by Robert De Niro featured 11 former federal prosecutors who endorsed the statement. "We all strongly believe that there is more than enough evidence to indict President Trump for multiple felony counts of obstruction of justice", former assistant U.S. Attorney Jennifer Rodgers said.

In April 2019, Former Deputy Attorney General and former Acting Attorney General Sally Yates remarked, "I've personally prosecuted obstruction cases on far, far less evidence than this, and yes, I believe if [Trump] were not the president of the United States, he would likely be indicted on obstruction".

=== Commentators ===
After the release of the report, media commentators again pointed out that in 2018, Barr, before rejoining government work, had authored an unsolicited memo to the Justice Department describing investigation into potential obstruction of justice by Trump was "fatally misconceived" and "overly aggressive", and also noted that the Barr memo argued that a president could not be charged for acts of presidential power, such as firing officials. NPR's Ron Elving, in referring to the memo, described that "we got the word on" the result on obstruction "early" because "Barr had already authored a 19-page explanation for why a president could not be charged with obstruction of justice – suggesting pointedly that Mueller should not even be thinking about it".

Although generally a liberal, Harvard Law School professor Alan Dershowitz, who has been among Trump's most prominent defenders in the Russia investigation, gave the report an "incomplete" on the conclusion of obstruction of justice, "C+" on legal analysis, and a "B+" on factual analysis, in an interview with Fox News. Dershowitz also gave the media coverage of the report an "F"; "Even with grade inflation, I just think the media comes off awful, terrible, for the most part. I think we are seeing an elimination of the distinction between the editorial page and the news pages in some of the leading media in the country, and that's a shame. Walter Cronkite could not get a job in the media today", Dershowitz said.

Fordham University law professor Jed Shugerman opined in the New York Times that: "The report's very high standard for legal conclusions for criminal charges was explicitly proof 'beyond a reasonable doubt'. So the report did not establish crimes beyond a reasonable doubt. But it did show a preponderance of conspiracy and coordination". In Shugerman's view, the preponderance of evidence standard is "relevant for counterintelligence and general parlance about facts, and closer to the proper standard for impeachment". He continues: "By the preponderance of evidence standard, the report contains ample evidence to establish conspiracy and coordination with the Russian government, sometimes through intermediaries, other times through a Russian spy". The Starr Report on President Clinton, which was organized as an "impeachment referral, not a prosecution decision", applied a lower standard of "substantial and credible information" more like the preponderance of the evidence standard. The Mueller report explained that the ability to conclude using the criminal proof beyond a reasonable doubt standard was "materially impaired" by lies by individuals associated with the Trump campaign and deletion of emails, among other factors.

=== Polling ===
A public opinion poll by Reuters and Ipsos conducted between the afternoon of April 18, 2019, and the morning of April 19 found that 37 percent of adults in the United States approved of Trump's performance in office, down from 40 percent in a similar poll conducted on April 15 and matching the lowest level of the year. The approval rating was also down from 43 percent in a poll conducted shortly after the Attorney General's summary was released on March 22. Among the respondents that said they were familiar with the Mueller report, 70 percent said the report had not changed their view of Trump or Russia's involvement in the U.S. presidential race and 15 percent said they had learned something that changed their view of Trump or the Russia investigation.

A poll by The Washington Post and ABC News conducted between April 22–25, after the Mueller report was released, found that 51% of respondents believed the investigation was fair; 53% said that it did not clear Trump of all wrongdoing; 58% said that Trump lied about matters that were investigated; 56% said that impeachment should not proceed; and support for impeachment is at a new low of 37%. A plurality of 47% said Trump tried to obstruct justice.

A YouGov and Huffington Post poll of 1000 American adults conducted on May 29 and 30, 2019, found that 72% of 2016 Trump voters who were aware that Mueller had stated that he would not clear Trump of a crime, still believed that the Mueller report exonerated Trump. The figure among corresponding Hillary Clinton voters and non-voters was 07% and 24% respectively.

A Fox News poll of registered voters released on June 16, 2019, found that 50% believed the Trump campaign had coordinated with the Russian government, the highest level of the eight times the poll had asked that question since June 2017.

== Subsequent actions with Congress ==
On April 18, Barr said: "the president confirmed that, in the interests of transparency and full disclosure to the American people, he would not assert privilege over the special counsel's report".

Congressional committees had wanted more answers about the process and findings of the Special Counsel investigation. The Associated Press described Trump's response to post-Mueller congressional investigations as 'Just say no' and 'Resist on every legal front', noting that Trump on April 24 had declared: "We're fighting all the subpoenas. [...] I thought after two years we'd be finished with it. No, now the House goes and starts subpoenaing."

On May 8, despite the previous statement by Barr, Trump asserted that all materials requested by Congress, including the un-redacted Mueller report, were sheltered by executive privilege. This was a "protective assertion" of executive privilege to prevent Congress from receiving the un-redacted Mueller report and its underlying material for the time being, pending his decision to make a "final assertion" of executive privilege.

=== House Judiciary Committee ===
==== Robert Mueller testimony ====
On April 18, House Judiciary Committee Chairman Jerry Nadler sent Mueller a letter requesting his testimony before the House Judiciary Committee "as soon as possible – but, in any event, no later than May 23, 2019". The Committee proposed that Mueller testify on May 15, but no agreement was ever reached. On May 10, Nadler said that Mueller would not testify the week of May 12. Nadler did not give a reason why but said "just hasn't developed".

On May 24, Nadler said that "He doesn't want to be public in what some people will regard as a political spectacle, I think," speaking about Mueller. "He's willing to make an opening statement, but he wants to testify in private," Nadler continued. "We think it's important for the American people to hear from him and to hear his answers to questions about the report."

On June 25, Chairman Nadler and chairman of the House Intelligence Committee, Adam Schiff, both publicly announced that Mueller agreed to publicly testify before House Judiciary and Intelligence Committees on July 17. Both committees had subpoenaed Mueller's testimony. However, the hearing was postponed to July 24 with a third hour added for questions, bringing the total to three.

On July 24, Mueller testified before the House Judiciary Committee after being subpoenaed. After the hearings, it was revealed that the House Judiciary Committee is "actively considering articles of impeachment and is seeking access to redacted materials from the Mueller report in order to decide whether to move forward with the process."

==== Don McGahn testimony ====
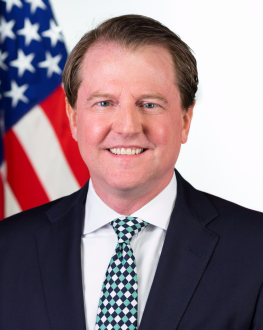
Don McGahn, former White House Counsel to President Trump

On April 22, the House Judiciary Committee subpoenaed Don McGahn to testify and to supply any documents related to the committee's investigation into obstruction of justice. The subpoena calls for the documents by May 7, and for McGahn to testify by May 21.

The Trump administration had been expected to claim executive privilege on parts of McGahn's testimony. Kellyanne Conway, counselor to President Trump, said on April 28: "Executive privilege is always an option, it's always on the table. But Don McGahn has already talked under oath for 30 hours. And this is just presidential harassment", Conway told Jake Tapper, adding that it is Trump's right to use executive privilege. Trump stated on May 2 that he would not allow McGahn to testify, and on May 7, the White House invoked executive privilege to withhold the documents that were subpoenaed. McGahn is expected to testify about President Trump's efforts to obstruct the Special Counsel, which McGahn said he was told to do but refused and threatened to resign if so ordered. McGahn's attorney said on May 7, that McGahn would "stand fast and do nothing – comply with neither the White House instructions nor the committee subpoena – until the legal questions surrounding the dispute have been resolved". The attorney added that "Where co-equal branches of government are making contradictory demands on Mr. McGahn concerning the same set of documents, the appropriate response for Mr. McGahn is to maintain the status quo unless and until the Committee and Executive Branch can reach an accommodation."

On May 20, 2019, President Trump directed McGahn to not comply with a subpoena that would make McGahn testify before the committee on May 21.

==== William Barr testimony ====
On April 26, the House Judiciary Committee announced that Barr would testify on May 2, regarding the Special Counsel investigation, its findings, allegations of obstruction of justice, and allegations of spying on the Trump Campaign. However, on April 28, Barr said he might not testify to the Committee because he was displeased about the format of the testimony he is expected to give. Nadler said "The witness [Barr] is not going to tell the committee how to conduct its hearing, period". On the prospect of Barr not showing up, Nadler stated: "Then we will have to subpoena him, and we will have to use whatever means we can to enforce the subpoena".

Barr did testify before the Republican-controlled Senate Judiciary Committee on the same topics on May 1.

On May 2, when Barr was to testify before the committee, Barr did not show up. Democrats on the House Judiciary Committee, specifically Democratic Representative of Tennessee Steve Cohen, mocked Barr for not showing up, calling him "Chicken Barr". Cohen brought a bucket of Kentucky Fried Chicken and a chicken prop to mock Barr.

On May 3, Nadler informed Barr that a subpoena had been issued giving him until May 6, 2019, to release the un-redacted Mueller report. Barr did not comply with the subpoena. The House Judiciary Committee is expected to vote on whether to bring forth Contempt of Congress on May 8. A law issued in 1857 gives Congress the power to issue criminal charges for this matter.

On May 8, 2019, Attorney General William Barr requested President Trump to initiate executive privilege over the subpoenaed redacted portions of the Mueller report.

Assistant Attorney General Stephen E. Boyd sent a letter to House Judiciary Committee chairman Jerry Nadler announcing that President Trump initiated executive privilege.

On May 8, Assistant Attorney General Stephen Boyd wrote Nadler that Barr would ask Trump to invoke executive privilege to withhold the full report if the Judiciary Committee proceeded to vote on a contempt charge. Boyd wrote in the letter to Nadler saying "We are disappointed that you have rejected the Department of Justice's request to delay the vote of the Committee on the Judiciary on a contempt finding against the Attorney General this morning ... Accordingly, this is to advise you that the President has asserted executive privilege over the entirety of the subpoenaed materials." Also on May 8, Barr wrote a letter to Trump to "request that you make protective assertion of executive privilege with respect to Department of Justice documents recently subpoenaed by the Committee on the Judiciary of the House of Representatives." On May 8, Trump invoked executive privilege for those documents at Barr's request. Trump's announcement of executive privilege came just hours before the House Judiciary Committee planned to vote on whether to hold Barr in contempt. The Committee voted unanimously to reject this assertion of executive privilege and approved a motion put forward by Rep. Matt Gaetz (R-Fl) which states that a vote to hold Barr in contempt would not "be construed as a directive for the Attorney General to violate Federal law or rules". In a 24–16 vote, the House Judiciary Committee approved a motion of Contempt of Congress against Barr.

==== Hope Hicks testimony ====
A day before Hope Hicks was expected to testify behind closed doors before the House Intelligence Committee on June 18, 2019, White House Counsel Pat Cipollone sent a letter to Committee chairman Jerry Nadler that President Trump instructed Hicks to not answer questions pertaining to her work at the White House. "Ms. Hicks is absolutely immune from being compelled to testify before Congress with respect to matters occurring during her service as a senior adviser to the President," Cipollone says. "Because of this constitutional immunity, and in order to protect the prerogatives of the Office of the President, the President has directed Ms. Hicks not to answer questions before the Committee relating to the time of her service as a senior adviser to the President."

In the letter, Cipollone cited various Office of Legal Counsel (OLC) opinions arguing that Hicks is immune from compelled testimony, including one issued by the Justice Department in May that Trump cited when instructing former White House counsel Don McGahn not to testify before the committee pursuant to a subpoena. Cipollone also indicated that the White House may try to block Hicks from answering questions about her time on the presidential transition team because of potential executive privilege concerns. "Much of Ms. Hicks's work during this period involved discussions with the President-elect and his staff relating to the decisions the President-elect would be making once he assumed office," Cipollone wrote. "Accordingly, her responses to specific questions about this period would likely implicate executive branch confidentiality interests concerning that decisionmaking process," he wrote. "In order to preserve the President's ability to assert executive privilege over such information, a member of my office will attend Ms. Hicks's testimony on June 19."

During Hicks' testimony, lawyers for the Trump administration forbade Hicks from answering questions 155 times, claiming that due to "absolute immunity", Hicks "may not speak about anything that occurred during the time of her employment in the White House as a close adviser to the President".

=== Senate Judiciary Committee ===
On May 1, Attorney General Barr testified before the Senate Judiciary Committee. Barr said he "didn't exonerate" Trump on obstruction as that was not the role of the Justice Department. Barr explained his decision that there was not enough evidence for Trump to be charged with obstruction by citing that the president did not commit an underlying crime related to Russia.

Then California Democratic Senator and future Vice President Kamala Harris questioned why neither Barr nor Rosenstein reviewed the underlying evidence in the report. "We accepted the statements in the report as the factual record. We did not go underneath it to see whether or not they were accurate, we accepted it as accurate," Barr said. He asserted this approach was common DOJ practice. Harris also asked Barr if Rosenstein had been cleared by ethics officials to be involved in the decision to not charge Trump of obstruction, given that Rosenstein was a witness to the investigation regarding James Comey's firing. Barr with the help of his aides concluded by saying "He was the acting attorney general on the Mueller investigation...I'm informed that before I arrived, he had been cleared by the ethics officials."

On the question of whether Trump could have ended the investigation, Barr said "the situation of the President, who has constitutional authority to supervise proceedings, if in fact a proceeding was not well founded, if it was a groundless proceeding, if it was based on false allegations, the President does not have to sit there, constitutionally, and allow it to run its course." He added, "The President could terminate that proceeding, and it would not be a corrupt intent, because he was being falsely accused. He later said that Trump "knew [the accusations against him] were false. And he felt this investigation was unfair, propelled by his political opponents and was hampering his ability to govern. That is not a corrupt motive for replacing an independent counsel". Politico described these comments as "Barr's expansive view of presidential authority to meddle in investigations". New York argued against Barr's "perverse conclusion" because first, "Trump could not possibly know that an investigation was unfounded"; second, "Mueller did not say Trump was innocent"; and third, "Trump's obstruction was quite possibly one of the reasons Mueller failed to establish underlying crimes".

Senator Richard Blumenthal asked Barr if he or his staff took notes on his March 28 call with Mueller. Barr confirmed there "were notes taken of the call", then told the committee that he would not share the notes with them: "Why should you have them?"

House Speaker Nancy Pelosi commented on Barr's testimony and accused Barr of lying before Congress. "What is deadly serious about it is the attorney general of the United States of America is not telling the truth to the Congress of the United States. That's a crime," Pelosi told reporters. "He lied to Congress. If anybody else did that, it would be considered a crime. Nobody is above the law," Pelosi said. Department of Justice spokeswoman Kerri Kupec responded to Pelosi's remarks and said that a "baseless attack on the Attorney General is reckless, irresponsible and false." According to CNBC, Pelosi's remarks were talking about Barr's comments in his April 9 testimony. Representative Charlie Crist: "Reports have emerged recently, general, that members of the special counsel's team are frustrated at some level with the limited information included in your March 24 letter. ... Do you know what they are referencing with that?" Barr: "No, I don't. I think I think, I suspect that they probably wanted more put out, but in my view I was not interested in putting out summaries."

On May 8, 2019, the Senate Judiciary Committee subpoenaed Donald Trump Jr. to answer questions surrounding abandoned developments of a Trump Tower in Moscow. Trump Jr. has testified before the Committee on the same topic and related matters in September 2017. Trump Jr. is expected to testify sometime in June for a second closed-door interview. According to the Washington Post: "Trump Jr. will testify for up to four hours and address a limited number of questions, these people said on the condition of anonymity to discuss sensitive negotiations."

=== House Intelligence Committee ===
The House Intelligence Committee announced on May 14, 2019, that it would investigate whether attorneys for Trump and his family members – Jay Sekulow, Alan Futerfas, Abbe Lowell and Alan Garten – "reviewed, shaped and edited" Michael Cohen's false testimony to Congress.

On June 25, 2019, House Intelligence Committee Chairman, Adam Schiff, and chairman of the House Judiciary Committee, Jerry Nadler, both publicly announced that Mueller agreed to publicly testify before House Judiciary and Intelligence Committees on July 17.

On July 24, 2019, Mueller testified before the House Intelligence Committee after being subpoenaed. When asked as to why the Special Counsel did not subpoena President Trump, Mueller stated that they did not subpoena the president "because of the necessity of expediting" the investigation. "If we did subpoena the president, he would fight the subpoena and we would be in the midst of the investigation for a substantial period of time."

=== Senate Intelligence Committee ===
The Senate Intelligence Committee had no doubts about Trump and his campaign's efforts to help Russia:

(U) The Committee's bipartisan Report unambiguously shows that members of the Trump Campaign cooperated with Russian efforts to get Trump elected. It recounts efforts by Trump and his team to obtain dirt on their opponent from operatives acting on behalf of the Russian government. It reveals the extraordinary lengths by which Trump and his associates actively sought to enable the Russian interference operation by amplifying its electoral impact and rewarding its perpetrators - even after being warned of its Russian origins. And it presents, for the first time, concerning evidence that the head of the Trump Campaign was directly connected to the Russian meddling through his communications with an individual found to be a Russian intelligence officer.

(U) These are stubborn facts that cannot be ignored. They build on the Committee's bipartisan findings in Volume 2 and Volume 4 that show an extensive Kremlin-directed effort to covertly help candidate Trump in 2016, and they speak to a willingness by a major party candidate and his associates, in the face of a foreign adversary's assault on the political integrity of the United States, to welcome that foreign threat in exchange for advancing their own self-interest.

== Possible future releases ==
A less-redacted version of the report "with all redactions removed except those relating to grand-jury information", which is required to be redacted by federal law, is expected to be available two weeks after the initial public release, to "a bipartisan group of leaders from several Congressional committees".

On April 19, 2019, House Judiciary Committee chairman Jerry Nadler issued a subpoena for the fully unredacted report. A DOJ spokesperson called Nadler's subpoena "premature and unnecessary", citing that the publicly released version of the report had "minimal redactions" and that Barr had already made arrangements for Nadler and other lawmakers to review a version with fewer redactions. Barr offered to let twelve designated members of Congress view the less-redacted report in a secure room at the Justice Department, and forbade them from sharing the contents with other legislators. Several Republicans took advantage of the offer; the six Democrats refused, saying the conditions were too stringent.

On May 8, 2019, President Trump used a "protective assertion" of executive privilege to block the subpoena by the House of Representatives. Thus, as of 8 May 2019, the House would not receive the unredacted Mueller Report and its underlying material, pending Trump's decision to make a "final assertion" of executive privilege after reviewing the subpoenaed material. Attorney General Barr had recommended earlier that day that Trump take this action.

=== Review of redactions ===
In March 2020, federal judge Reggie Walton, appointed to his position by President George W. Bush, declared that he would personally review the redactions made in the Mueller report to ensure that the redactions were legitimate. This came during a lawsuit filed by the pro-transparency Electronic Privacy Information Center and media outlet BuzzFeed News to release the full, unredacted report under the Freedom of Information Act. Walton cited that he had concerns on whether the redactions were legitimate, due to Attorney General William Barr having displayed a "lack of candor" regarding the report.

A comparison of the originally-released Muller Report and the one released in June 2020 with sections regarding Roger Stone revealed.

According to Walton, Barr's March 24 letter not only had a "hurried release", but also "distorted" the findings of the report; while Barr went on to make "misleading public statements" about the report. As such, Walton had concerns that Barr may have made a "calculated attempt to influence public discourse" in favor of President Trump by establishing "a one-sided narrative" about the report which was contrary to the report's findings. Walton questioned if the report's redactions were then in fact "self-serving" to avoid conflict with Barr's statements, and if the Justice Department used "post-hoc rationalizations" to defend Barr. On June 19, 2020, in response to the lawsuit, the Department of Justice released a less-redacted public version of the Mueller report, revealing new information about Roger Stone and WikiLeaks. The unredacted portions contradicted public statements made by Trump and the campaign officials that they did not know anything about the WikiLeaks release beforehand, and this information was corroborated by the Senate Intelligence Committee report on Russian interference in the 2016 United States presidential election that was released in August 2020.

On October 6, 2020 President Trump, referencing the Mueller report, tweeted "I have fully authorized the total Declassification of any & all documents pertaining to the single greatest political CRIME in American History, the Russia Hoax." Trump also said in an interview "I've fully declassified everything. Everything's been declassified." In response to the President's statement, BuzzFeed requested an unredacted version of the report; however, BuzzFeed's request for an unredacted report was denied by the Department of Justice (DOJ). Someone told Walton, "... the President's statements on Twitter were not self-executing declassification orders..." To clear up the position of the President, Walton ordered a continuance until October 21, 2020, so "I can get something from White House counsel saying that they conferred with the president, and the president, in fact, did not intend to declassify the information ..." On October 20, 2020, and contrary to Trump's Twitter statements, White House chief of staff Mark Meadows stated in a federal court filing that Trump's tweets were not official orders to declassify FBI Russia probe documents.

The day before the November 3, 2020, election, the Special Counsel's office released previously redacted portions of the Mueller report per the federal judge's order in the lawsuit mentioned above filed by BuzzFeed News and the Electronic Privacy Information Center, while allowing other portions to remain redacted.

In summary, per Buzzfeed: "Although Wikileaks published emails stolen from the DNC in July and October 2016 and Stone – a close associate to Donald Trump – appeared to know in advance the materials were coming, investigators 'did not have sufficient evidence' to prove active participation in the hacks or knowledge that the electronic thefts were continuing. In addition, federal prosecutors could not establish that the hacked emails amounted to campaign contributions benefitting Trump's election chances …"

The newly released material also stated: "While the investigation developed evidence that the GRU's hacking efforts in fact were continuing at least at the time of the July 2016 WikiLeaks dissemination, ... the Office did not develop sufficient admissible evidence that WikiLeaks knew of – or even was willfully blind to – that fact." As reported by Buzzfeed, "Likewise, prosecutors faced what they called factual hurdles in pursuing Stone for the hack."

In 2021, United States Federal Judge Karen L. Henderson ordered the Department of Justice to unredact portions of their findings, but left other findings to remain redacted based on the privacy of the non-criminal actions of non-public figures included in the report.

== See also ==
- Cyberwarfare by Russia
- Russian interference in the 2016 United States elections
- Senate Intelligence Committee report on Russian interference in the 2016 United States presidential election
