= Cassandra MacDonald =

American journalist and activist

- Born: Cassandra Fairbanks; March 11, 1985 (age 41); United States
- Occupation: Online journalist
- Writing career
- Years active: 2014–present

Cassandra MacDonald (née Fairbanks; March 11, 1985) is an American journalist and activist. As a journalist, she has worked for the Russian state-owned international news agency Sputnik (2015–2017), far-right American conspiracy theory websites Big League Politics (2017) and The Gateway Pundit (since 2017), as well as Timcast (since 2021).

A one-time supporter of Bernie Sanders, MacDonald has received attention for her political transformation to a supporter of Donald Trump. As an activist, she is best known for "Find the Dancing Man", her 2015 social media campaign against fat shaming, and for helping to organize the DeploraBall in Washington, D.C., to celebrate the 2017 inauguration of President Donald Trump. In 2020, MacDonald submitted evidence to the legal team defending WikiLeaks founder Julian Assange in his London extradition hearing.

== Early life ==
Cassandra MacDonald grew up in a small town in central Massachusetts, an hour from Boston. She is of Puerto Rican descent on her mother's side, and claims to have roots in Catalonia. After high school, she enrolled at the University of Massachusetts Amherst to study physics, but dropped out after a few months. Moving to California, she attended the Los Angeles Recording School and became a sound engineer. In that capacity, she traveled the country, working for bands in what Cosmopolitan calls "the Warped Tour vein."

== Activism ==
MacDonald's activism began with Greenpeace environmentalism, followed by animal rights protests at SeaWorld and circuses. In 2013, she took part in the hacktivist collective Anonymous and helped run a popular Anonymous Twitter account. By then living in Pittsburgh, she traveled to Ohio and helped organize the outcry over the Steubenville High School rape case. In 2015, MacDonald spent several months with Black Lives Matter in Ferguson, Missouri, amid civil unrest stemming from the 2014 fatal shooting of Michael Brown by a police officer.

=== Social media ===
In 2015, photos posted on the anonymous chat board 4chan created what the BBC called one of the year's "biggest internet sensations" by showing an obese, 47-year-old Englishman dancing exuberantly at a concert. "Spotted this specimen trying to dance the other week," the caption read. "He stopped when he saw us laughing." Incensed at the fat shaming, MacDonald launched a social media campaign to "Find the Dancing Man". With a friend, MacDonald created a GoFundMe account to locate the man and fly him to Los Angeles for a celebrity-packed party with 1,000 guests at Avalon Hollywood, one of L.A.'s hottest clubs. The viral campaign raised $70,000 for anti-bullying and positive body image charities in the U.S. and UK.

=== Shift to right ===
Violent protests outside the DeploraBall in Washington, D.C., on January 19, 2017

In 2016, MacDonald "underwent something of a political transformation," according to BBC News. Having begun the year as a supporter of Hillary Clinton's main rival within the Democratic Party, Vermont U.S. Senator Bernie Sanders, MacDonald was by fall rallying her 70K Twitter followers to support Donald Trump. In an October 2016 episode of BBC Television's Panorama, MacDonald said, "I'm going to be voting for Donald Trump. I think that Hillary Clinton is a terribly dangerous person."

Cosmopolitan subsequently named her a leader in the defiant Deplorable movement, alluding to a campaign speech by Hillary Clinton. In January 2017, MacDonald was one of the organizers of the DeploraBall, an unofficial inaugural ball at Washington's National Press Club to celebrate Trump's victory.

In January 2020, she was named as a witness and her communications were subpoenaed in the defamation lawsuit between NPR and Ed Butowsky over reporting and conspiracy theories about the murder of Seth Rich. In February 2020, MacDonald attended the America First Political Action Conference, meeting with author Michelle Malkin and Nick Fuentes.

In 2020, MacDonald claimed that trespassers set upon her house on the night of May 31, pounding on windows, detonating fireworks directed towards her residence, and shooting firearms; she blamed Antifa for the incident. A supporter set up a GoFundMe campaign to help with moving costs, which accrued over $24,000. Right wing watch published a report contradicting MacDonald's claims, citing "conversations with eight of Fairbanks' nearby neighbors," "nonexistent coverage in local press," and a report obtained from the Metropolitan Police Department—all of which corroborated only the claim that fireworks were detonated approximately 100 feet away and no gunshots were fired.

== Writing career ==
MacDonald's writing career began in 2014 as an outgrowth of her activism. At the Free Thought Project, she reported mostly about police brutality. In 2015 she wrote for PINAC News, continuing to chronicle controversial policing around the United States. That summer, she live streamed her own arrest while covering anti-police brutality protests on Interstate 70 in St. Louis.

Also in 2015, MacDonald was hired as a reporter for the Russian state-funded international news agency Sputnik, and moved to Washington, D.C., for the position. In early 2016, while still with Sputnik, MacDonald also wrote 10 bylined articles for Teen Vogue. While working for Sputnik, MacDonald was often a target of conspiracy theories by Louise Mensch; MacDonald filed a complaint with the FBI's Internet Crime Complaint Center against Mensch for cyber stalking and harassment.

In April 2017, MacDonald and Mike Cernovich posed for a photo behind the lectern in the White House briefing room, each making an OK gesture at the camera. According to Britain's The Independent, this "sparked outcry on social media" because the hand sign can symbolize white power. MacDonald denied the gesture was racist, citing her partial Puerto Rican ancestry (her mother is from San Juan). After journalist Emma Roller tweeted the photo, which she captioned "just two people doing a white power hand gesture in the White House," MacDonald sued in federal court alleging defamation. A year later, the court found that MacDonald failed to show that Roller posted the image with actual malice.

Upon leaving Sputnik, MacDonald spent April–November 2017 as a senior reporter at Big League Politics. In December 2017, MacDonald became the Washington bureau chief for The Gateway Pundit.

In 2021, American political commentator Tim Pool hired MacDonald to run his website.

=== WikiLeaks ===
In October 2017, MacDonald wrote a story for Big League Politics about Julian Assange. In January 2020, National Public Radio subpoenaed MacDonald seeking documents and electronically stored information relating to her conversations with Assange, among others, including journalists. The subpoena was part of a defamation lawsuit against NPR by Texas money manager Ed Butowsky. MacDonald's attorney responded that since the subpoena requested work product protected under the District of Columbia's reporter shield law, "no documents or other things will be produced pursuant to the subpoena."

On February 24, 2020, Politico reported that MacDonald had submitted evidence to the legal team defending Assange in his London extradition hearing. The evidence consists of screenshots and recorded phone calls spanning October 2018 – September 2019 that MacDonald had with Arthur Schwartz, identified by The New York Times as a "conservative consultant who is a friend and informal adviser to Donald Trump Jr.".

On February 27, 2020, The Daily Dot reported that MacDonald posted audio of a September 2019 phone call from Schwartz to her in which he stated that Ambassador Grenell "took orders from the president" in brokering Assange's arrest.

On September 21, 2020, MacDonald's written statement was read in a London court during extradition proceedings against Assange. She recounted receiving advanced details from Schwartz about U.S. plans to charge Assange in connection with the Manning leaks. The barrister representing the U.S. government questioned the partiality of MacDonald, an acknowledged WikiLeaks supporter, and argued that "the truth of what Ms. Fairbanks was told by Arthur Schwartz was not in her knowledge." MacDonald also said when Schwartz phoned her in October 2018 after she posted an interview with Assange's mother in a group chat that included Schwartz and others close to Trump, he "was extremely angry" and alluded to her nine-year-old child, "which I perceived as an intimidation tactic." MacDonald said he repeatedly told her to stop advocating for WikiLeaks and Assange, saying a pardon would not happen. She added that besides informing Assange of all this during her January 2019 visit with him, "I also met with Chelsea Manning in person and told her that I feared they might come after her again."

=== Chelsea Manning ===
MacDonald sent Chelsea Manning personal letters while Manning was in prison. After Manning's release, she and MacDonald were on opposing sides in a protest in the Bay Area, though they later met over coffee to converse. In January 2018, MacDonald provided a complimentary ticket and VIP wristband for Chelsea Manning to attend "A Night for Freedom" gala for Trump supporters.
