= Dancing Man (person) =

Sean O'Brien (born 1968 or 1969), known online as Dancing Man, is a financier from London or Liverpool (sources vary).

Dancing Man became famous in March 2015 after dancing at a gig. A fat-shaming image of him was posted anonymously on the imageboard website 4chan, with the caption "Spotted this specimen trying to dance the other week. He stopped when he saw us laughing", and was followed by the bullying on Dancing Man. The image later went viral with support for Dancing Man, which included Ellie Goulding and Pharrell Williams. Afterwards, people on Twitter, including Cassandra Fairbanks, started an anti-bullying campaign to identify Dancing Man, under the hashtag #FindDancingMan, so that they could encourage him to continue dancing. By 12 hours after the campaign started, there were 11,000 tweets with the hashtag. They subsequently started a GoFundMe fundraising campaign to throw a party for him, which had raised US$13,000 by 6 March, and later rose to $40,830, which was mostly donated to the Cybersmile Foundation. L.A. Coliseum offered to be the venue.

The party occurred in Los Angeles and was attended by over 1,000 people and raised money for anti-bullying charities. The party was DJed by Moby. Guests included musician Andrew W.K., writer and activist Monica Lewinsky, and Pharrell Williams through video. He danced with Meghan Trainor in Rockefeller Plaza before a party in Los Angeles. Outside the party was paparazzi and a queue of over 200 people.

Dancing Man was given interviews in the US, UK, Japan, Germany. Dita Von Teese gave him a taco lunch. Whitney Way Thore wanted to include the event on the season finale of the television series My Big Fat Fabulous Life. He also made an appearance on the Today Show,, was given a private tour of the Los Angeles Memorial Coliseum, and threw the ceremonial first pitch for a baseball game between the Los Angeles Dodgers and the San Diego Padres.
