= Salute (disambiguation) =

A salute is a gesture or other action used to indicate respect.

Salute may also refer to:

== Gestures ==
- Nazi salute
- One-finger salute, another term for the finger
- Three-finger salute (disambiguation)
- Two-finger salute
- Quenelle (gesture)

== Military ==
- Gun salute
- 21-gun salute, a military honour
- USS Salute (AM-294)
- USS Salute (AM-470)

== Society and politics ==
- Bellamy salute, a salute formerly used to accompany the United States Pledge of Allegiance
- Imperial Salute, the national anthem of Iran under the Shah
- Roman salute
- Vice Regal Salute, a piece of music played before Commonwealth governors

== Entertainment ==
- Ten-bell salute, used in professional wrestling to honor a wrestler who has died
- Vulcan salute, used in the Star Trek series
- Salute (1929 film), a film featuring John Wayne
- Salute (2008 film), a documentary by Matt Norman
- Satyam (2008 film) or Salute, an Indian Telugu-language film
- Salute (2009 film), an Indian Kannada-language film
- Salute (2016 film), a biographical film on Aitzaz Hasan
- Salute (2022 Indian film), an action thriller film
- Salute (2022 Taiwanese film), a film about dancer Sheu Fang-yi

== Music ==
- Salute (musician), a DJ and producer

=== Albums ===
- Salute (Little Mix album), 2013, or its title track (see below)
- Salute (Gordon Lightfoot album), 1983, or its title track
- Salute (21 Guns album), 1992
- Salute, a non-profit album by Leslie Cheung

=== Songs ===
- "Salute" (song), a 2014 song by British girl group Little Mix from Salute (see above)
- "Salute", a song by Cardi B from Am I the Drama?
- "Salute", a song by Fabolous from Loso's Way
- "Salute", a song by Future from Purple Reign

== Other ==
- Salute (pyrotechnics), a device designed to make a loud bang
- Salute (yacht), a 2008 sailing superyacht, later named Bayesian
- Basilica di Santa Maria della Salute, a church in Venice commonly known as La Salute
