= OK gesture =

Hand gesture

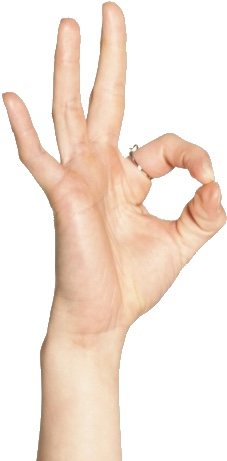
The OK gesture

An emoji version of the gesture

The OK gesture, OK sign or ring gesture is a gesture performed by joining the thumb and index finger in a circle, and holding the other fingers straight or relaxed away from the palm. Commonly used by scuba divers, it signifies "I am OK" or "Are you OK?" when underwater. In most English-speaking countries it denotes approval, agreement, and that all is well or "okay". In other contexts or cultures, similar gestures may have different meanings including those that are negative, offensive, financial, numerical, devotional, political, or purely linguistic.

== Positive denotations ==
=== Classical use ===
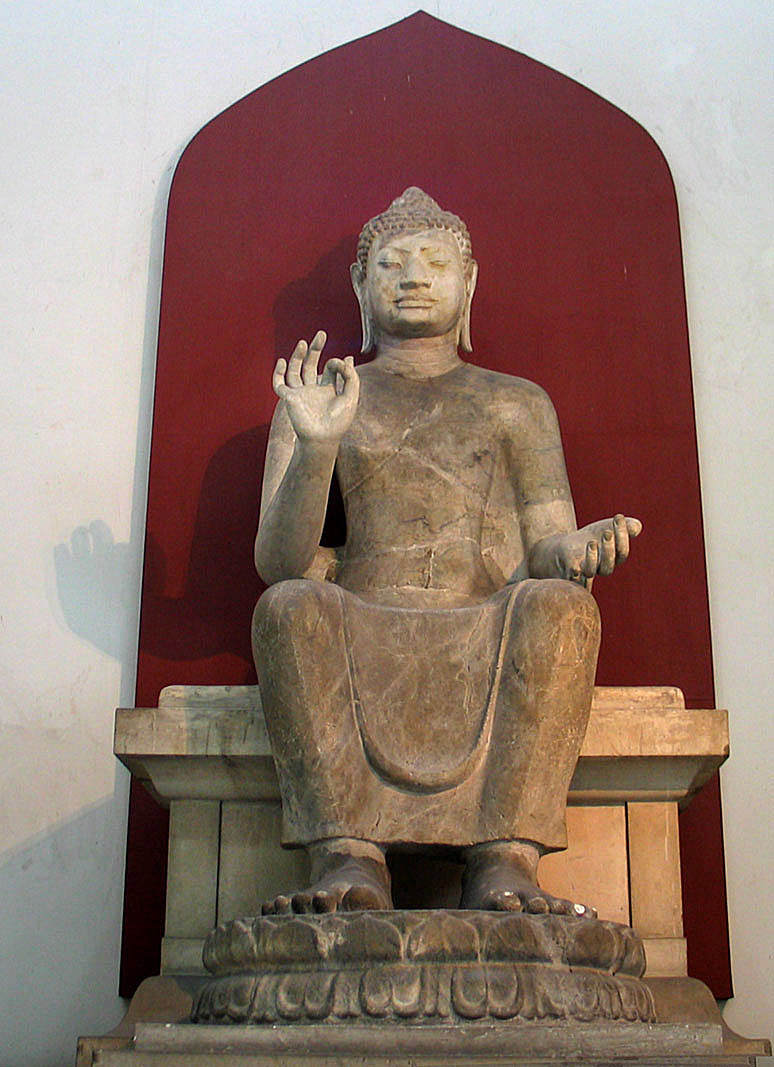
Buddha statue in Thailand depicting the gesture as Vitarka Mudrā.

Ring gestures, formed by forefinger and thumb with remaining digits extended, appear in Greece at least as early as the fifth century BCE, and can be seen on painted vases as an expression of love, with thumb and forefinger mimicking kissing lips. When proffered by one person toward another in Ancient Greece, the gesture was of one professing their love for another, and the sentiment was conveyed more in the touching of fingertips than in the ring that they formed. As an expression of assent and approval, the gesture can be traced back to first century Rome where the rhetorician Quintilian is recorded as having used it. Quintilian's chironomy prescribed variations in context for the gesture's use during specific points of a speech: to open, give warning or praise or accusation, and then to close a declamation.

Contemporaneously, the sign appeared throughout the Buddhist and Hindu diasporas as a symbol of inner perfection. Ethologist Desmond Morris posits that the joined thumb-and-forefinger communicates precision in grasping something literally or figuratively, and that the shape formed by their union represents the epitome of perfection—a circle—hence the gesture's transcultural message that things are "exactly right" or "perfect".

In Naples, the gesture has been long used to symbolize love and matrimony, as was custom in neighboring Greece, but specifically with the palm upturned, while the gesture made with a downturned palm represents a hand holding the scales of justice. Across Italy, the gesture remained in use as one for making points in conversation when moved about to express discursive precision, but when held still in an upright position with fingers jutting skyward, it became an emblem of perfection.

Early records of the sign's usage in the English-speaking world date to British physician-philosopher John Bulwer's 1644 Chirologia, "The naturall language of the hand composed of the speaking motions, and discoursing gestures thereof." Among the many hand gestures detailed by Bulwer, he described one as "The top of the fore-finger moved to joyne with the naile of the Thumbe that's next to it, the other fingers in remitter," and said that it was "opportune for those who relate, distinguish, or approve".

=== "OK" ===
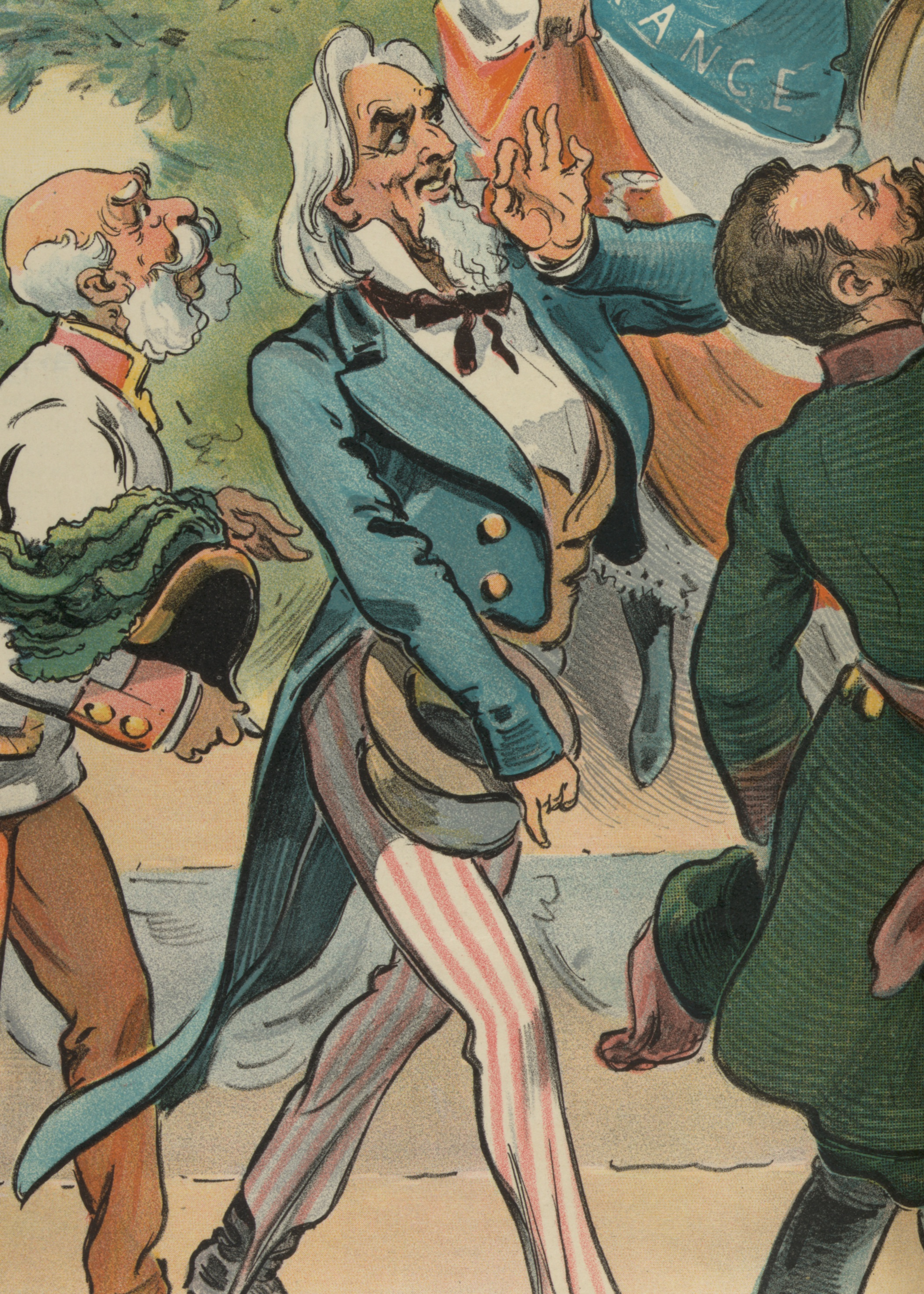
Caricature of Uncle Sam making the "OK" gesture in a cartoon for the 1900 Paris Exposition

By the early 19th century in the United States, the gesture was affiliated with the letters "O" (formed by the circle) and "K" (derived from the extended fingers). While it is not known exactly how the OK gesture and the corresponding verbal expression coalesced, the English professor Allen Walker Read dates the expression's rise in usage to an 1839 humor piece in the Boston Morning Post describing the expression "o.k." as meaning "all correct", suggesting comically misspelled initials, at a time when acronyms for misspelled words were in vogue. Several other broadsheets in Boston, New York and Philadelphia ran with the expression in their own columns, some with misspellings of "all correct" such as oll korrect, bringing the phrase into the vernacular of American English.

The following year Democrats began using the phrase and its accompanying gesture in support of president Martin Van Buren's campaign for reelection. A native of Kinderhook, New York, Van Buren was widely known by his nickname, "Old Kinderhook", whose initials, "O.K.", were steadily gaining traction as an expression of approval. In New York City, fans of Van Buren formed the O.K. Democratic Club and used the gesture as its sign, with the slogan of "O.K." bearing the double meaning in the club's catchphrase, "Old Kinderhook is all correct." Both phrase and gesture made their way into newspapers around the country via political cartoons, thus further spreading the expression. After Van Buren's defeat to William Henry Harrison, O.K. was briefly satirized as meaning "Owful Kalamity" or "Owful Katastrophe".

As a gesture, its denotation is more positive than the word "OK", which may mean a thing is merely mediocre, satisfactory at only the most basic level, as in, "The food was OK." The gesture is commonly understood as a signal of approval, and is sometimes used synonymously with the Western thumbs up gesture.

=== Scuba diving ===
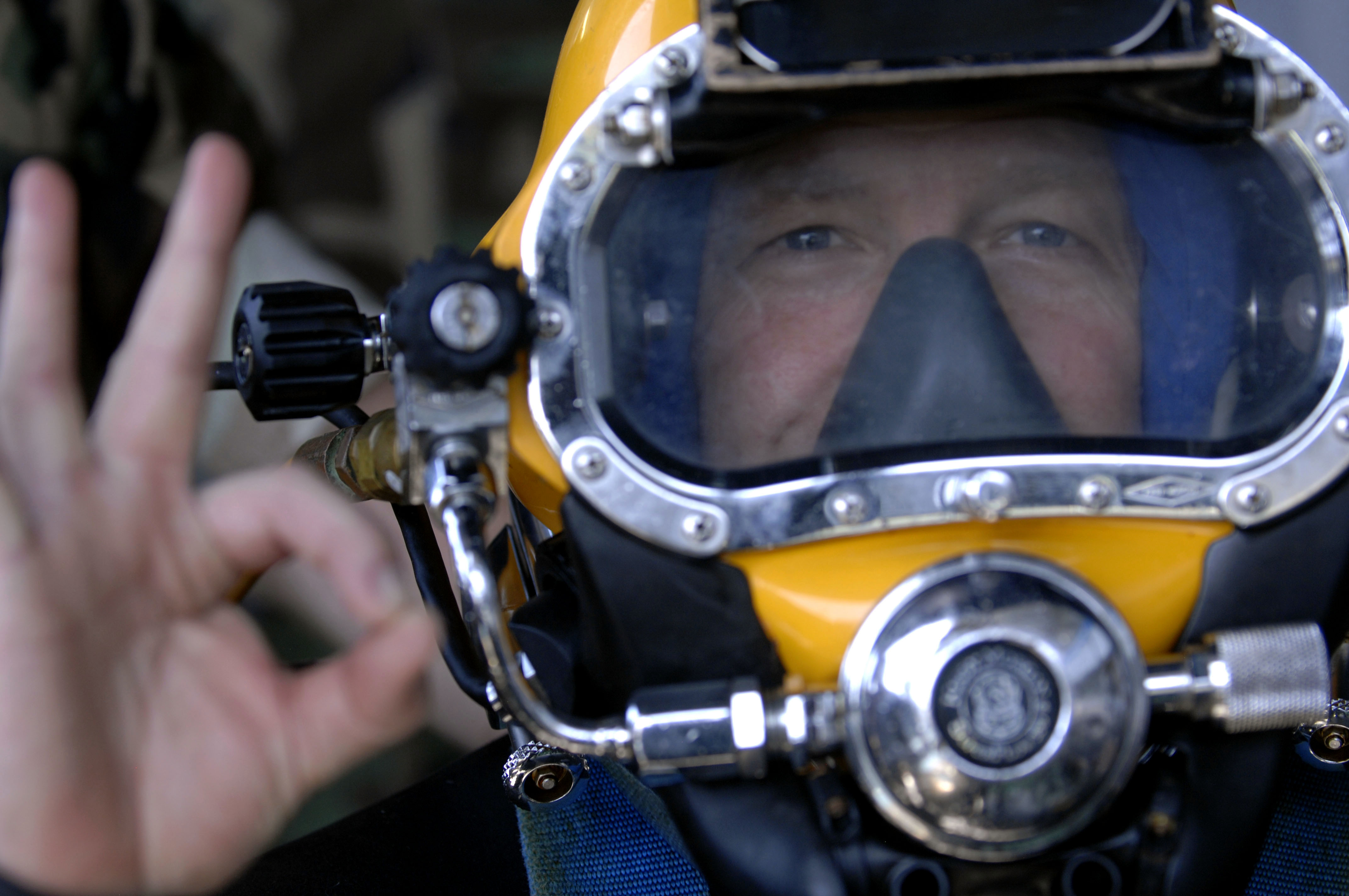
Diver's signal meaning "Everything OK", used both as a question and as a response to that question.

In the communication used by scuba divers, the OK sign is specific in its meaning that "everything is OK" as regulated by the Recreational Scuba Training Council. Divers are taught to always use this sign and not the thumbs up gesture because the latter means that a diver needs to ascend. The gesture is also used as a means of checking in, with one diver using it to ask another, "Everything OK?" and the response meaning, "Yes, everything is OK."

At distances where the standard OK gesture may be hard to see, divers use larger signals as an alternative, either with one hand atop the head and the elbow bent out to the side, or with both hands touching above the head so that the arms form an "O" for "OK". This full-body gesture is also used as "OK" in Japan where the single-handed gesture denotes monetary transactions instead of meaning "OK". This two-armed OK gesture was added to Unicode in 2010 as U+1F646 🙆 FACE WITH OK GESTURE and became part of Emoji 1.0 in 2015.

=== Money ===
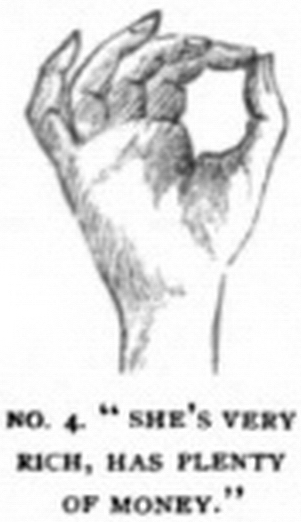
Illustration from an 1880s account of gestures used in Mexico

In Japan, the one-handed ring gesture is used to symbolize money, and in this context the fingers' circular shape represents a coin. Sometimes the sign is used to avoid the verbal awkwardness in talking about or asking for money. In other contexts, it can be used to imply a bribe or other illicit financial transactions, or signal an invitation to enter into business negotiations.

In other parts of the world the gesture can also express money, financial transactions, wealth or the priciness of an item. Records of the gesture being used to remark on a person's wealth or status are documented as practiced in Mexico during the late nineteenth century.

=== Mudra ===
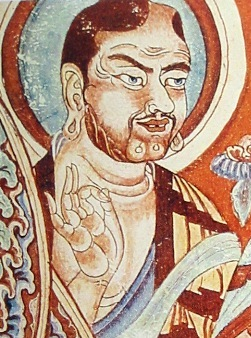
Wall painting depicting a vitarka mudra from the 9th century

In yoga, the gesture is known as chin mudra ("the seal of consciousness") when the palm is face down, or jnana mudra ("the seal of wisdom") when the palm is face up or held in other positions, such as in front of the heart. Some schools of yoga use chin and jnana mudra interchangeably, while others claim that "the former produces a subtle feeling of rootedness, the latter a sense of lightness," or that jnana "the passive receiving position" while chin "is an actively giving position". In these mudras the middle, ring, and little fingers represent the three gunas of rajas, tamas, and sattva which, when in harmony, unite ātman and brahman, or the individual soul and universal soul. The pressing together of the thumb and forefinger represents that union—or "yoga"—of consciousness. In Buddhism the gesture is called vitarka mudra ("the seal of discussion") and is used to emphasize the meaning of words.

== Sign language ==
Most sign languages combine hand shapes, movement, and position in relation to the rest of body, as well as additional body language and facial expression. As with other hand signs, the OK gesture may be combined with other elements to convey numerous meanings across multiple sign languages.

=== Monastic signing ===
Dating back to the tenth century in Europe, the gesture of thumb and forefinger forming a ring with the remaining fingers extended was used in a set of standardized ecclesiastical signs employed by Christian monks under vows of silence to represent numerous religious rites and objects. For example, when held out in front of oneself the gesture represented an oblation to God. When touched to the mouth it meant taking a meal. When added to the open-palmed sign for "book" it specified a hymnal, and the sign's O-shape represented the signing of an "O" that began many hymns. If the thumb and forefinger took hold of a specific part of one's own clothing or body such as the hood of a cowl, a lock of hair, or skin on the left hand, the gesture could stand for things as diverse as "monk" or "horse" or "parchment".

=== Plains Indian Sign Language ===
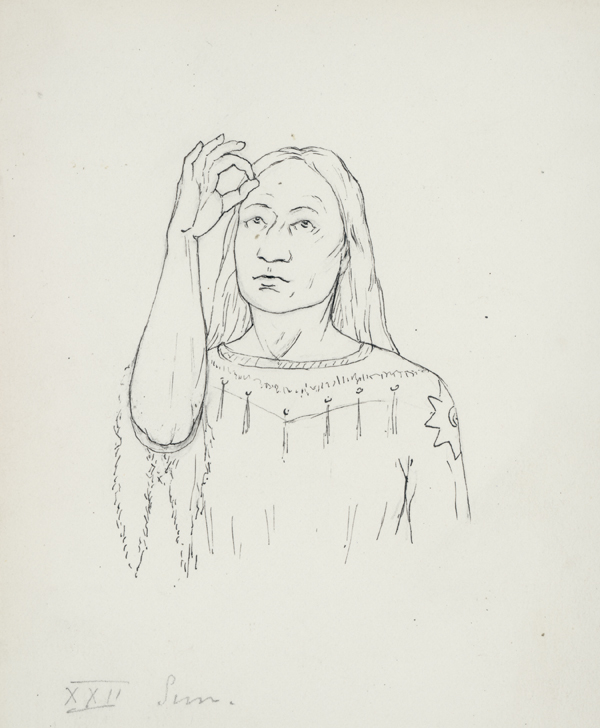
An 1880 drawing of a person displaying the sign for "sun" in Plains Indian Sign Language

In Plains Indian Sign Language (PISL), the gesture signifies the Sun when held up in front of the face or moved in an arc following the Sun's track. When held up to the sky and peered through, it is the sign for high noon. A PISL primer printed in an 1888 issue of the Canadian residential school newspaper Our Forest Children specifies that the left hand be used to indicate sunrise and the right for sunset. A more complicated series of movements with hands held in the gesture as if drawing a thread or stretching an elastic can signify death, or more specifically, "After a long time, you die."

=== American Sign Language ===
In modern-day American Sign Language (ASL) the gesture can mean many different things depending on how it is applied. The pinching action of the thumb-and-forefinger frequently represents something small. For example, the sign for "housefly" is made by making the gesture mimic a fly buzzing around. In ASL the gesture can also communicate a selection of some sort: When moved from one side to the other as if picking something up and placing it down, it means "appoint". When the joined thumb and forefinger of the gesture are placed into a hole made by the opposite hand, it means "vote". The sign for "elect" is formed by making the signs for "vote" and "appoint" in succession.

=== Fingerspelling ===
The letter "F" in the American manual alphabet

In systems of fingerspelling used in sign languages, the handshape of joined thumb and forefinger represents various letters. The American manual alphabet reserves it for the letter F, while in both Irish and French Sign Languages, it represents the letter G. In fingerspellings that represent Cyrillic alphabetical systems, such as the Ukrainian manual alphabet, the gesture represents the vowel O and reflects that letter's shape. Similarly, the Korean manual alphabet uses the gesture for the Hangul letter ieung to reflect its pronunciation in spoken Korean. In yubimoji, Japanese Sign Language's (JSL) manual syllabary, the gesture is the syllable me.

Various fingerspelling systems may call for other specific features of the gesture beyond its joined thumb-and-forefinger with remaining fingers entended. For example, the ring in the sign for me in JSL is slightly tapered rather than rounded.

=== Counting ===
In ASL, the OK gesture represents the number 9 when held in a stationary position with the palm facing away from the signer. This ASL numerical sign is the last in a sequence of single-digit integers where quantities of fingers denote the numbers 1 through 5, and then the thumb touches each finger in turn to denote "6" (pinky finger), "7" (ring finger), "8" (middle finger), and finally "9" (index finger). When shaken from left to right, the sign for the number 9 becomes the number 19.

In Plains Indian Sign Language, the gesture signifies the number 3 when held a bit lower than the signs used to represent the sun. Regional forms of finger counting used in China also employ the raised middle, ring and pinky fingers to express the number 3, either with thumb and index fingers joined as they are in the OK gesture or in a similar configuration. This number gesture is primarily used in China's southern provinces, while in the north, "3" may also be expressed by the raised index, middle, and ring fingers as it is in English-speaking countries. Both methods are distinct from having the thumb, index and middle fingers extended as is used to denote "3" in much of mainland Europe, because this represents the number 8 in both Taiwan and parts of mainland China.

Greco-Roman chironomia also included a counting system in which the ring gesture stood for either "10", "30", "100", or "300", the exact number being determined by which hand was used and the exact point of contact between thumb and forefinger.

== Negative denotations ==
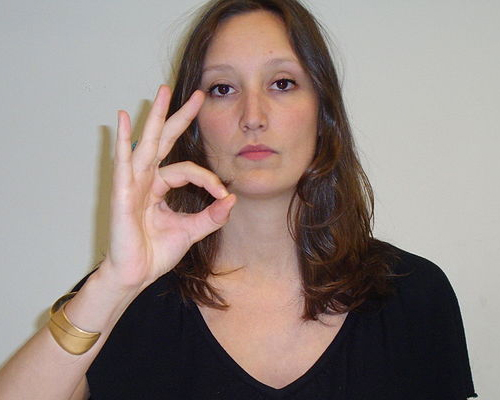
In countries such as France where the OK gesture bears both positive and negative meanings, facial expression helps contextualize its meaning.

While widespread use of the OK gesture has granted it an international meaning of assent, it also bears negative, vulgar, or offensive meanings in many regions of the world. In contrast to Japan's use of the expression to represent coins and wealth, the gesture's "O" shape stands for "zero" meaning "worth nothing" in France and Tunisia. In many Mediterranean countries such as Turkey, Tunisia, and Greece, as well as in the Middle East, parts of Germany, and many parts of Latin America, the gesture may be interpreted as a vulgar expression resembling a human anus, referring to sex, either as an insult ("You are an asshole"), or a homophobic reaction to a symbol of homosexuality and the act of sodomy.

In some middle-eastern countries, the shaking of this sign represents the evil eye and is used as a curse or a threat, sometimes in conjunction with verbal condemnation.

In some regions of the world, both the positive "OK" and the negative forms are practiced, which can lead to confusion over which meaning is intended. In regions and cultures where the gesture has a historically negative meaning, its use as an "OK sign" is often the result of its appearance in media and tends to be used more by younger people. In France, where widespread use has seeped in through American culture, the gesture's positive "OK" sentiment became popular in the north of the country while its negative meaning as "worthless" remained in the south. To avoid confusion, French communicators have become accustomed to using additional context clues, such as posture or facial expression, to clarify meaning. In other circumstances, the gesture's varied meanings are less easily reconciled, as was the case in the 1950s Brazil when United States Vice President Richard Nixon emerged from his airplane displaying the sign with each hand. While Nixon's intent was to communicate goodwill to the people of São Paulo, the crowd received it with offense.

== Other denotations ==
=== United Macedonia Salute ===
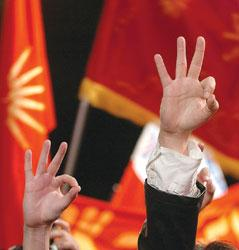
The United Macedonia Salute, mirroring the Vergina Sun flag in the background

In Europe's Balkan region, the OK gesture is known as the "United Macedonia Salute" in its association with irredentist campaigns for a united Macedonia. For Macedonian nationalists the two fingers forming the "O" stand for the Macedonian word Обединета (Obedineta, meaning "United"), and the other three fingers symbolize the regions of Aegean Macedonia in northern Greece, Pirin Macedonia in southwestern Bulgaria, and the region of Vardar Macedonia that roughly corresponds to the Republic of North Macedonia's borders. Taken together, the United Macedonia Salute also resembles the Vergina Sun that was the royal symbol of Ancient Macedonia. Both sun and salute became popular among Macedonian Greeks in the 1980s, and the sun appeared on the Macedonian flag after the Republic of Macedonia declared independence from Yugoslavia in 1992. Three years later Macedonia changed its flag under economic pressure from Greece, which saw the use of the Vergina Sun as a threat against Greek sovereignty. The United Macedonia Salute remains controversial among many people in the Balkan region, especially those living within parts of Greece or Bulgaria that Macedonian nationalists wish to claim as provinces for their country.

=== Medical testing ===
The gesture is used by doctors to test functionality of the anterior interosseous nerve and seek indications of median nerve palsy in the hands. When performing the test, a patient makes the OK gesture with both hands. If the circle formed by one hand appears more pinched or less round than the other, it may indicate weakness in the nerve.

A similar medical test, known as Froment's sign, is used to test for palsy on the ulnar nerve. To perform the test, a patient holds a piece of paper between their forefinger and thumb, and the examiner attempts to pull it out of the patient's grip. If ulnar nerve palsy is present, the patient will have difficulty maintaining their hold and may compensate by flexing the thumb to add more pressure.

=== Chef's kiss ===
The chef's kiss

The chef's kiss is a sign that means "perfection" in the context of food. It is a hand gesture from the mouth, sometimes with the thumb and forefingers. Other times the chef's kiss is merely communicated with an OK sign near the face.

=== "The circle" game ===
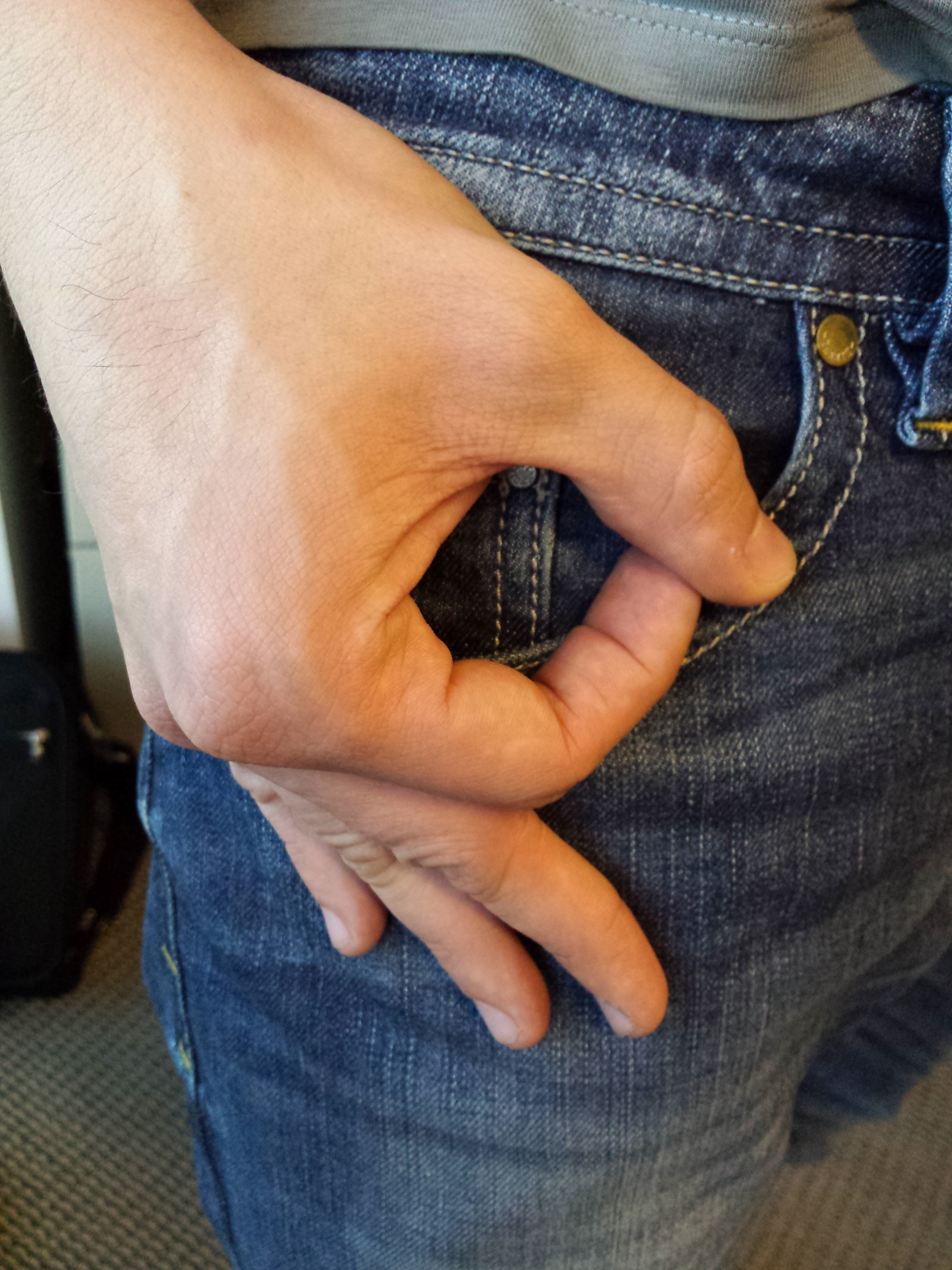
"The circle" positioned below the waistline as it appears in the circle game

The OK gesture is key feature of a popular school prank called "the circle game". Someone who initiates the game makes the gesture below their own waistline and tries to trick an opponent into glancing at it. If the opponent glances at it, the gesture maker "has the self-styled right" to punch their opponent, generally on the arm. In one variation, a player who can insert their own index finger into the circle without looking at it may punch the circle-maker.

The circle game is reported to have been played in schoolyards across the United States since at least the 1970s–1980s, and came to particular prominence after being featured on the sitcom Malcolm in the Middle in the early 2000s. Vice News has interviewed an Ohio man who claims he invented the game in the early 1980s, though this has not been independently verified. The circle game also made a resurgence in the 2010s as a form of photobomb prank or internet meme, and began to engender controversy after the OK gesture was also sometimes used as a white power symbol starting in 2017.

== In popular culture ==
=== The Prisoner ===
The gesture was given prominence in the 1967 British television series The Prisoner, in which a number of unnamed characters are held captive in a village. Whenever these imprisoned villagers took leave of each other, they did so with the phrase "Be seeing you", accompanied by the gesture held up in front of their own eye as a reminder that despite any pretenses of freedom, they were all prisoners. The gesture is also used as a greeting in the show without the "be seeing you" phrase. The series' lead actor Patrick McGoohan stated that the show had adopted the gesture from the sign of the fish used by early Christians.

=== As a film title ===
In 2010, South Indian film director Upendra Rao made a cinematic comeback with a film that fans called Super, but whose actual title was 👌. Rao himself starred in his film as a non-resident Indian who returns to his homeland to turn the nation into a utopian society. In depicting the film's title only as a hand symbol, Rao's intent was for the audience to name it, thinking that they might call it "Zero" or "Three", or associate it with Vitarka Mudra or the symbol for om (ॐ). During the film's opening credit sequence, the Vitarka Mudra title transforms into a hand pointing at the viewer announcing the name of the director as "U".

=== Corporate logos ===
The gesture has been used as a design element in several corporate and organizational logos. These include the Piramal Group, Bharat Petroleum, and Adlabs Studios, all headquartered in India. It is also used as a branding logo of Okamoto Industries line of condoms.

=== White power symbol ===
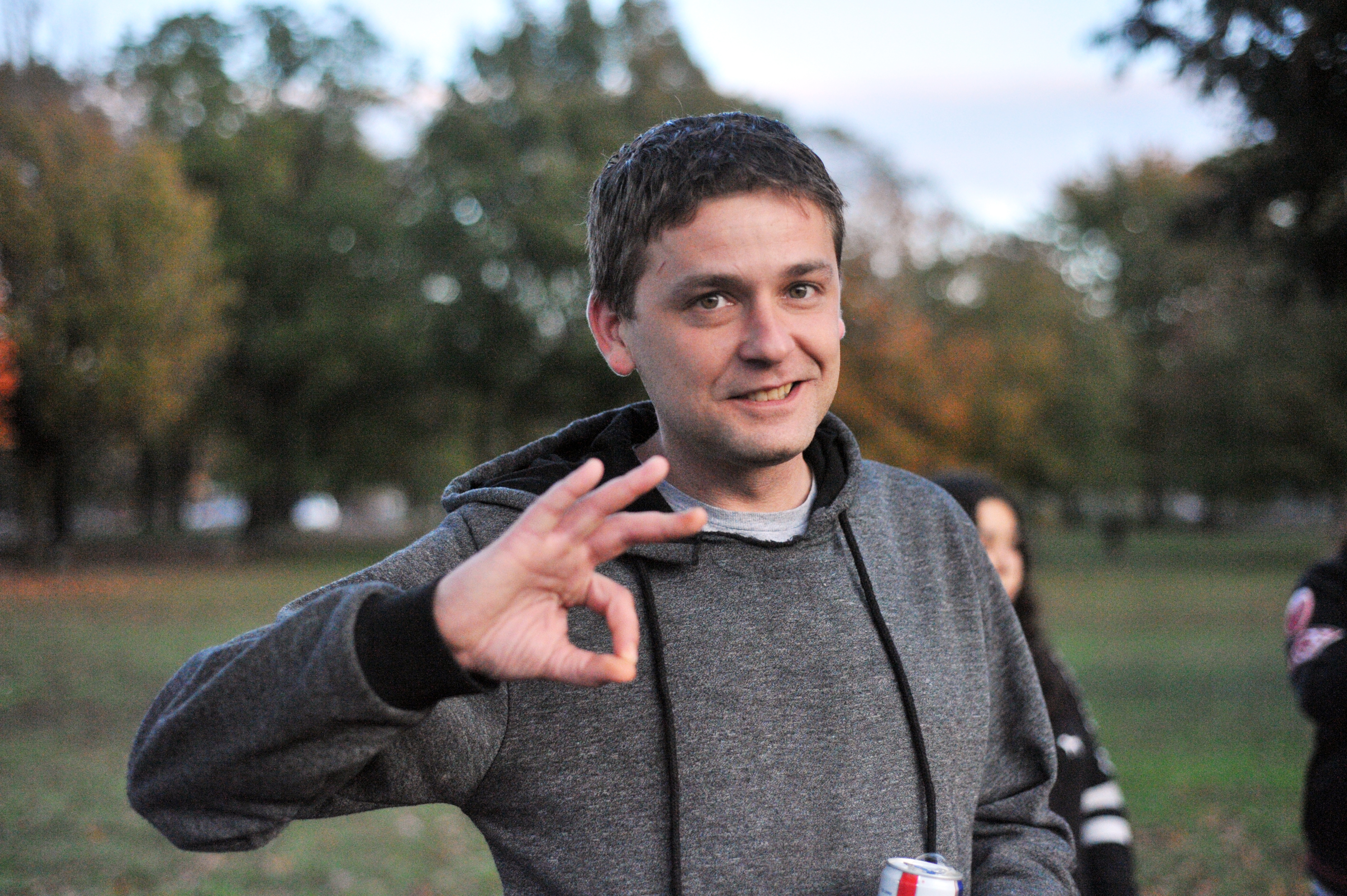
Zach Rehl, leader of the Philadelphia Proud Boys, making the OK gesture in November 2020

In 2017, as a provocative joke, users on 4chan aimed to convince the media and other people that the OK gesture was being used as a white power symbol. According to The Boston Globe, users on 4chan's /pol/ ("Politically Incorrect") board were instructed in February 2017 to "flood Twitter and other social media websites...claiming that the OK hand sign is a symbol of white supremacy" as part of an online trolling campaign dubbed "Operation O-KKK".

The association of the gesture with white supremacy derived from the assertion that the three upheld fingers resemble a W and the circle made with the thumb and forefinger resemble the head of a P, together standing for "White Power". While some members of the alt-right started using the symbol after the launch of the 4chan campaign, it initially remained ambiguous whether or not it was being used to communicate genuine adherence to white supremacy, or with deliberately ironic motives. (Note: wikt:Schrödinger's douchebag)

In September 2019, the Anti-Defamation League added the OK gesture to its "Hate on Display" database. The listing notes that while the usage of the OK hand gesture "in most contexts is entirely innocuous", some white supremacists have begun using the OK symbol "as a sincere expression of white supremacy", so care should be taken to evaluate the intent behind the gesture in context. Some white supremacists have acknowledged using the symbol as a gesture of white power. As a result of white supremacists' co-opting the symbol, some people have been accused of genuine use of the sign in support for white supremacist ideology: The gesture has moved from hoax to an established part of white supremacy culture.

- In April 2017, alt-right blogger and political commentator Mike Cernovich alongside online journalist Cassandra MacDonald both made the gesture while posing for a picture at the White House. Cernovich later told BuzzFeed News reporter Joe Bernstein that he was using the hand gesture as a reference to rapper Jay-Z and conspiracy theories alleging that the gesture is linked to the Illuminati.
- In July 2018, four police officers in Jasper, Alabama, were suspended for a week for making the gesture while posing for a group photo.
- In September 2018, the U.S. Coast Guard disciplined an employee who conspicuously made this gesture in the background of a newscast.
- In March 2019, Idaho Lt. Governor Janice McGeachin received considerable criticism for posing with members of the 3 Percenter right-wing militia group outside of her office who made the palm-inward gesture.
- In March 2019, the perpetrator of the Christchurch mosque shootings showed the sign in a New Zealand courtroom during his arraignment for the shooting of 51 people.
- In May 2019, Conservative People's Party of Estonia's Mart Helme, Minister of the Interior, and his son, Martin Helme, Minister of Finance, caused controversy by publicly flashing the OK hand gesture.
- In May 2019, a Chicago Cubs fan was banned from Wrigley Field for using the gesture behind black commentator Doug Glanville during a TV report.
- In May 2019, Chicago's Oak Park and River Forest High School spent $53,000 to reprint its yearbook after 18 students showed the OK sign in pictures. School officials stated that the symbol's association with white supremacy could jeopardize the students' reputations and future college and job prospects, so they would be removing the photographs from the yearbook in its reprinted form.
- In October 2019, an actor portraying the character Gru from Despicable Me was fired by the Universal Orlando theme park, for displaying the gesture in a photo with a biracial girl. The photo showed the costumed actor standing behind the girl while making the OK gesture on her shoulder.
- In October 2019, a police officer in Melbourne, Australia was investigated for flashing the symbol at climate protesters, after it was found his social media accounts displayed a number of memes circulated by the alt-right movement. Another officer at the same event was photographed wearing a sticker with a slogan reading "EAD hippy" on his body camera.
- In January 2020, the perpetrator of the Bærum mosque shooting flashed the Nazi salute and the OK hand sign during a court hearing. He repeated the use of the sign at the start of his trial.
- During the 2021 storming of the United States Capitol, men in the crowd were pictured making the gesture.
- During his arraignment in June 2026, the accused gunman of the 2026 Chico Public Library Shooting was seen flashing the symbol for news cameras.

== See also ==
- A-ok
- OK
- Three-finger salute
- Thumb signal
