= Three-finger salute =

Three-finger salute may refer to:

- Three-finger salute (Serbian), a salute used by Serbs
- Three-finger salute (Sicilian), a salute used by Sicilian nationalists and separatists
- Three-finger salute (pro-democracy), a gesture originally from the Hunger Games books and films and later used in protests in Myanmar and Thailand
- Three-finger salute, a jocular term for the three-key command Control-Alt-Delete on a computer keyboard
- Scout sign and salute, the salute of the World Scouting Movement

== See also ==
- Two-finger salute

Other hand gestures involving three fingers:

- OK gesture, holds a variety of meanings in different countries and contexts
- Schwurhand, a traditional gesture used in central Europe when swearing an oath
- Shocker (gesture), holds vulgar or sexual meanings
- Tryzub salute, a gesture used to mimic the Ukrainian Tryzub
- Kühnen salute or Kühnengruss, a replacement for the Nazi salute
