= My Big Fat Fabulous Life =

American reality television series

- Genre: Reality
- Starring: Whitney Way Thore; Barbara Thore; Glenn Thore; Hunter Thore; Buddy Bell; Ashley Baynes; Todd Beasley; Tal Fish; Heather Sykes
- Country of origin: United States
- Original language: English
- No. of seasons: 14
- No. of episodes: 174

Production
- Camera setup: Multi-camera
- Running time: 42 minutes
- Production company: Pilgrim Studios

Original release
- Network: TLC
- Release: January 13, 2015 – present

My Big Fat Fabulous Life is an American reality television series that premiered on January 13, 2015. The series chronicles the life of Whitney Way Thore, a woman who weighed 380 pounds (170 kg) at the beginning of the series (which is partially attributed to polyendocrine metabolic ovarian syndrome (PMOS)). Thore became popular when her former radio station's morning show, Jared and Katie in the Morning on 107.5 KZL, in Greensboro, North Carolina, came up with and posted "107.5 KZL's Fat Girl Dancing" videos, with more than eight million views on YouTube.

== Cast ==
=== Main ===
- Whitney Way Thore
- Barbara "Babs" Thore, Whitney's mother who passed away in December 2022
- Glenn Thore
- Hunter Thore
- Buddy Bell
- Ashley Baynes
- Todd Beasley
- Tal Fish
- Heather Sykes (seasons 2–9)

=== Recurring ===
- Hunter Thore

== Episodes ==
=== Series overview ===
Season	Episodes	Originally released	
Season	Episodes	First released	Last released
1	11	January 13, 2015	February 10, 2015
2	23	September 9, 2015	November 18, 2015
3	11	June 8, 2016	August 17, 2016
4	14	January 24, 2017	April 25, 2017
5	13	January 2, 2018	March 27, 2018
6	13	January 1, 2019	March 26, 2019
7	13	January 7, 2020	March 24, 2020
8	15	November 10, 2020	February 16, 2021
9	12	August 17, 2021	November 2, 2021
10	12	August 9, 2022	October 25, 2022
11	13	September 5, 2023	November 28, 2023
12	12	July 9, 2024	September 24, 2024
13	10	July 1, 2025	September 2, 2025
14	TBA	November 10, 2026	2026

=== Season 1 (2015) ===
No. overall	No. in season	Title	Original release date
1	1	"A Fat Girl Dancing"	January 13, 2015
2	2	"Hate Mail"	January 20, 2015
3	3	"The Say-Yes Philosophy"	January 20, 2015
4	4	"More Than a Buddy"	January 27, 2015
5	5	"Doing the Beach"	January 27, 2015
6	6	"A Fling Thing"	February 3, 2015
7	7	"The Wedding Job"	February 3, 2015
8	8	"The Double Blind Date"	February 10, 2015
9	9	"Leaving the Nest"	February 10, 2015
10	10	"The Skinny"	February 10, 2015
11	11	"Babs Knows Best (Special)"	May 10, 2015

=== Season 2 (2015) ===
No. overall	No. in season	Title	Original release date
12	1	"Whitney's Back!"	September 9, 2015
13	2	"Pasta la Vista, Baby"	September 9, 2015
14	3	"7th Inning Splits"	September 16, 2015
15	4	"A Home of Her Own"	September 16, 2015
16	5	"Design a Date"	September 23, 2015
17	6	"5K Run"	September 23, 2015
18	7	"Aloha 30"	September 30, 2015
19	8	"Little Big Girl Dance Class"	September 30, 2015
20	9	"First Day on the Job"	October 7, 2015
21	10	"Fighting the Scale"	October 7, 2015
22	11	"A Muse in the Nude"	October 14, 2015
23	12	"Not Your Mama's Cat Show"	October 14, 2015
24	13	"No Body Shame"	October 21, 2015
25	14	"Big Girls Summer Showcase"	October 21, 2015
26	15	"Burning Love"	October 28, 2015
27	16	"Whitney Live: #NoBS"	November 4, 2015
28	17	"Working at the Car Wash"	November 4, 2015
29	18	"Whitney's Ticking Clock"	November 11, 2015
30	19	"Big Whit's Debut"	November 11, 2015
31	20	"Truth or Dare"	November 18, 2015
32	21	"A Dance to Remember"	November 18, 2015
33	22	"Whitney Takes on LA"	November 18, 2015
34	23	"The Skinny"	November 25, 2015

Note: Episode 0, "Special Weigh-In," premiered on September 16, 2015.

=== Season 3 (2016) ===
No. overall	No. in season	Title	Original release date
35	1	"I Wanna Be Fat"	June 8, 2016
36	2	"A Brush with Death"	June 15, 2016
37	3	"Speechless"	June 22, 2016
38	4	"Losing at Love"	June 29, 2016
39	5	"(Fat Girl) Spread Thin"	July 6, 2016
40	6	"Cereal Stalker"	July 13, 2016
41	7	"Fat Jokes"	July 20, 2016
42	8	"Flirting with Disaster"	July 27, 2016
43	9	"Big Fat Breakup"	August 3, 2016
44	10	"The Skinny: Part 1"	August 10, 2016
45	11	"The Skinny: Part 2"	August 17, 2016

=== Season 4 (2017) ===
No. overall	No. in season	Title	Original release date
46	1	"Knocked Up?"	January 24, 2017
47	2	"Immaculate Misconception"	January 31, 2017
48	3	"Baby Fat"	February 8, 2017
49	4	"Judging Whitney"	February 15, 2017
50	5	"How Low Can Whit Go?"	February 22, 2017
51	6	"I Kissed a Girl"	February 28, 2017
52	7	"Whitney Calls in Backup"	March 7, 2017
53	8	"Big Girl Dance Battle"	March 14, 2017
54	9	"Whitney Gets a Date"	March 21, 2017
55	10	"Belly Up"	March 28, 2017
56	11	"Big Girl in the Big Apple"	April 4, 2017
57	12	"Toe to Toe"	April 11, 2017
58	13	"Whitney Steps Up"	April 18, 2017
59	14	"The Skinny"	April 25, 2017

=== Season 5 (2018) ===
No. overall	No. in season	Title	Original release date
60	1	"Rescue Me"	January 2, 2018
61	2	"Ghosted"	January 9, 2018
62	3	"Big Fat Ambush"	January 2, 2018
63	4	"Buddy's Missing"	January 24, 2018
64	5	"Buddy's Big Secret"	January 30, 2018
65	6	"We're Having a Baby"	February 6, 2018
66	7	"A Sobering Reality"	February 13, 2018
67	8	"Aloah Buddy"	February 20, 2018
68	9	"One K at a Time"	February 27, 2018
69	10	"Who's Your Buddy"	March 6, 2018
70	11	"Buddy's Next Move"	March 13, 2018
71	12	"My Big Fat Baby"	March 20, 2018
72	13	"The Skinny"	March 27, 2018

=== Season 6 (2019) ===
No. overall	No. in season	Title	Original release date
73	1	"Single, Fat and Crazy"	January 1, 2019
74	2	"If Heather Finds Out..."	January 8, 2019
75	3	"Old Habits Die Hard"	January 15, 2019
76	4	"Big Girl, Little Bus"	January 22, 2019
77	5	"Buddy's New Girl"	January 29, 2019
78	6	"Fat Hating Is Real"	February 5, 2019
79	7	"Big Girls Don't Cry"	February 12, 2019
80	8	"Obsessive Habits"	February 19, 2019
81	9	"Hiking and Biking and Bears, Oh My!"	February 26, 2019
82	10	"Where's Buddy Sleeping"	March 5, 2019
83	11	"A Stormy Affair"	March 12, 2019
84	12	"Whitney and Buddy Get Serious"	March 19, 2019
85	13	"The Skinny - Game Night"	March 26, 2019

=== Season 7 (2020) ===
No. overall	No. in season	Title	Original release date
86	1	"A Tale of Two Whitneys"	January 7, 2020
87	2	"Whit's New Man"	January 14, 2020
88	3	"Big Fat Moves"	January 21, 2020
89	4	"Friends with Benefits"	January 28, 2020
90	5	"Work on the Jerk"	February 4, 2020
91	6	"Whitney Meets the Parents"	February 11, 2020
92	7	"Drinking Buddy"	February 18, 2020
93	8	"Super Heavyweight Ladies"	February 25, 2020
94	9	"Amends Between Friends"	March 3, 2020
95	10	"Worth the Weight"	March 10, 2020
96	11	"A Fat Girl in Paris"	March 17, 2020
97	12	"A Big Fat Proposal"	March 24, 2020
98	13	"The Skinny - Engagement Party"	March 24, 2020

=== Season 8 (2020-2021) ===
No. overall	No. in season	Title	Original release date
99	1	"Wedding Bells are Ringing"	November 10, 2020
100	2	"Whitney's Long-Distance Relationship"	November 17, 2020
101	3	"Slipping Through My Fingers"	November 24, 2020
102	4	"Safer at Home"	December 1, 2020
103	5	"My Big Fat Broken Heart"	December 8, 2020
104	6	"Whitney Confronts Chase"	December 15, 2020
105	7	"Sex, Lies and Sandwiches"	December 22, 2020
106	8	"Sink or Swim"	December 29, 2020
107	9	"The Buddy System"	January 5, 2021
108	10	"A Big Fat Ultimatum"	January 12, 2021
109	11	"Weight-Loss Surgery"	January 19, 2021
110	12	"Whitney Gets Her Groove Back"	January 26, 2021
111	13	"Big Fat Brawl"	February 2, 2021
112	14	"Big Fat Baby News"	February 9, 2021
113	15	"The Skinny"	February 16, 2021

=== Season 9 (2021) ===
No. overall	No. in season	Title	Original release date
114	1	"Big Fat French Crush"	August 17, 2021
115	2	"From Tutor to Suitor"	August 24, 2021
116	3	"Will You Be My Surrogate?"	August 31, 2021
117	4	"Vaxed and Waxed"	September 7, 2021
118	5	"Retreat Yourself"	September 14, 2021
119	6	"Crappy Birthday to You"	September 21, 2021
120	7	"Chase'n the Frenchman"	September 28, 2021
121	8	"A Big Fat Disappointment"	October 5, 2021
122	9	"Fat Lips"	October 12, 2021
123	10	"Maine Reason for Tension"	October 19, 2021
124	11	"Late, Toothless and High"	October 26, 2021
125	12	"Bon Voyage, Whitney"	November 2, 2021

=== Season 10 (2022) ===
No. overall	No. in season	Title	Original release date
126	1	"For the Love of Babs"	August 9, 2022
127	2	"Thore Family Values"	August 16, 2022
128	3	"Business Decisions in the Bedroom"	August 23, 2022
129	4	"A New Home for Babs"	August 30, 2022
130	5	"Big Fat Sex Reveal"	September 6, 2022
131	6	"Pole Dancing Bride"	September 13, 2022
132	7	"Hand-Fed Bananas"	September 20, 2022
133	8	"A Big Fat Wedding, but Not Mine"	September 27, 2022
134	9	"Let's Get Physical"	October 4, 2022
135	10	"Fat Girl in a Little Car"	October 11, 2022
136	11	"Relationship Status: Open"	October 18, 2022
137	12	"What Is Love? Lennie Don't Hurt Me"	October 25, 2022

=== Season 11 (2023) ===
No. overall	No. in season	Title	Original release date
138	1	"Babs"	September 5, 2023
139	2	"My Big Fat Family Secret"	September 12, 2023
140	3	"My Big Fat Alabama Fama"	September 19, 2023
141	4	"My Big Fat Weigh-In"	September 26, 2023
142	5	"My Big Fat Home Alabama"	October 3, 2023
143	6	"My Big Fat Alabama Baptism"	October 10, 2023
144	7	"My Dad's Big Fat Fabulous Past"	October 17, 2023
145	8	"My Big Fat Disastrous Party"	October 24, 2023
146	9	"My Big Fat Vacation Proposal"	October 31, 2023
147	10	"My Dad's Big Fat Family Tattoo"	November 7, 2023
148	11	"My Big Fat Dental Adventure"	November 15, 2023
149	12	"My Big Swiss Family Thore"	November 21, 2023
150	13	"My Big Fat Family Heartbreak"	November 28, 2023

=== Season 12 (2024) ===
No. overall	No. in season	Title	Original release date
151	1	"Since U Been Gone"	July 9, 2024
152	2	"Country Grammar"	July 16, 2024
153	3	"Everybody Have Fun Tonight"	July 23, 2024
154	4	"All I Want for Christmas"	July 30, 2024
155	5	"Get the Party Started"	August 6, 2024
156	6	"Private Dancer"	August 13, 2024
157	7	"Heaven Is a Place on Earth"	August 20, 2024
158	8	"Who Let the Dogs Out"	August 27, 2024
159	9	"Higher Love"	September 3, 2024
160	10	"In Your Room"	September 10, 2024
161	11	"Despacito"	September 17, 2024
162	12	"Dark Horse"	September 24, 2024

=== Season 13 (2025) ===
No. overall	No. in season	Title	Original release date
163	1	"Bake Me a Baby as Fast as You Can"	July 1, 2025
164	2	"Twinkle, Twinkle, Fertile Star"	July 8, 2025
165	3	"Pussycat, Pussycat, Where Have You Gone"	July 15, 2025
166	4	"Rockabye Maybe"	July 22, 2025
167	5	"Round and Round the Cauldron Go"	July 29, 2025
168	6	"If You're Witchy and You Know It"	August 5, 2025
169	7	"The Town Mouse and Country Mouse"	August 12, 2025
170	8	"When She Got There, the Cupboard was Bare"	August 19, 2025
171	9	"The Lady on the Bus Goes Bye Bye Bye"	August 26, 2025
172	10	"London Bridge is Calling Now"	September 2, 2025

=== Season 14 (2026) ===
No. overall	No. in season	Title	Original release date
173	1	"Are You Pregnant?"	November 10, 2026
174	2	"He's My Friend That's A Boy"	November 17, 2026
175	3	"This Feels Impulsive"	November 24, 2026
176	4	"The Doctor Says It's Juicy"	December 1, 2026

== International broadcast ==
In Australia, the series premiered on TLC on May 26, 2015.
