= Whitney Way Thore =

American television personality

- Born: April 14, 1984 (age 42); Greensboro, North Carolina, U.S.
- Education: Appalachian State University
- Occupations: Activist; dancer; celebrity; amateur powerlifting
- Years active: 2014–present
- Parents: Glenn Thore (father); Barbara "Babs" Thore (mother, deceased)
- Relatives: Hunter Thore (brother)

Whitney Way Thore (born April 14, 1984) is an American television personality and subject of the reality show My Big Fat Fabulous Life, which airs on TLC.

== Early life and education ==
Whitney Way Thore was born on April 14, 1984, in Greensboro, North Carolina, to Glenn and Barbara Thore.

In 2000, Thore was accepted into the Theatre Summer Enrichment Program at the Governor's School of North Carolina of Meredith College. After graduating from Page High School (2002), Thore enrolled at Appalachian State University in Boone, North Carolina, majoring in Theatre. After she graduated from college, Thore relocated to South Korea to teach English to school children.

== Career ==
After Thore returned to the U.S. from Korea, she became the on-air producer of the Greensboro, North Carolina radio show Jared & Katie in the Morning on 107.5 KZL.

On February 27, 2014, the show created a dance video called "A Fat Girl Dancing" on 107.5 KZL's YouTube channel. Soon, the video went viral, allowing Thore to promote her message of body acceptance and positive body image. As a direct result, Thore was featured on numerous media outlets such as ABC News, NBC's Today Show, and The Huffington Post. In early January 2015, TLC aired My Big Fat Fabulous Life, which chronicled Thore's life and her initial mission to lose weight, but evolved to document her search for love. Her show has 11 seasons, with the 12th premiering in late 2024. The first season aired with ten episodes, and TLC premiered the second season in September 2015.

In May 2016, Thore released her memoir, I Do It with the Lights On: And 10 More Discoveries on the Road to a Blissfully Shame-Free Life.
