= Ed Butowsky =

American financial advisor

Ed W. Butowsky
- Born: Edward Wayne Butowsky; February 12, 1962 (age 64)
- Other name: Ed Butowsky
- Education: University of Texas (BA in marketing)
- Occupation: Financial advisor
- Years active: 1987–present
- Known for: Financial advisor; author; podcaster
- Website: www.edbutowsky.com

Edward "Ed" Wayne Butowsky (born February 12, 1962) is an American financial advisor, author, commentator and managing partner of Chapwood Investments, LLC, a private wealth management advisory firm.

Butowsky was involved with a 2018 Fox News story alleging the murder of Democratic National Committee (DNC) staffer Seth Rich was related to a leak of DNC information. In 2018 he was a co-defendant in a lawsuit filed by Rich's family alleging that the report fueled conspiracy theories about Rich's death and caused the family emotional distress. The suit was settled out of court, with an apology from Butowsky to the Rich family.

== Early life and education ==
Butowsky was born in 1962 and raised in Laurel, Maryland and Chappaqua, New York. His mother was Lois Butowsky and father was David Butowsky, chief enforcement officer for the U.S. Securities and Exchange Commission.

== Career ==
=== Chapwood Investments ===
Butowsky founded the private wealth management firm Chapwood Investments in 2005. He is currently a managing partner in Chapwood Investments and created the Chapwood Index. By 2013, he was managing investments for a hundred professional athletes. Butowsky started the celebrity and athlete investor group Clubhouse Investment Club with professional baseball player Torii Hunter. Butowsky was also a managing director at Bear Stearns.

Butowsky published the 2019 book Wealth Mismanagement: A Wall Street Insider On the Dirty Secrets of Financial Advisers and How to Protect Your Portfolio.

=== Chapwood Index ===
The Chapwood Index was created by Ed Butowsky to reflect the true cost-of-living increase in America. Updated and released twice a year, it reports the unadjusted actual cost and price fluctuation of the top 500 items on which Americans spend their after-tax dollars in the 50 largest cities in the United States.

Butowsky has also developed various investment tools and calculators, including The Chaptimizer, 8 Metrics, Chapvest, Portfolio Enhancer, Chip Score, and Side by Side Calculator. Butowsky founded the 1940 Act fund Paramount Access Advisors for hedge funds in 2012.

== Controversies ==
In June 2018, Butowsky filed a defamation lawsuit in U.S. federal court seeking $57 million in damages from NPR and one of its reporters, David Folkenflik. Butowsky accused Folkenflik of pushing a "false narrative" of Butowsky's involvement in a now-retracted Fox News story alleging that the murder of Democratic National Committee staffer Seth Rich was connected to the 2016 leak of DNC emails to WikiLeaks. Butowsky also alleged that Folkenflik conspired with an attorney to extort money from Fox. Butowsky told Courthouse News Service that he still believes the Fox News story was accurate. The case was scheduled to go to trial in mid-2021 but instead Butowsky is retreating from his legal offensive. Butowsky later moved to voluntarily dismiss nearly half a dozen Seth Rich-related lawsuits. That includes a high-profile defamation suit he had filed in 2018 against NPR, NPR editors and executives, and one of NPR's senior reporters, David Folkenflik, for in-depth reporting about Butowsky and his role in promoting the theories.

In August 2020, Butowsky still insisted the retracted Fox News story was accurate. He claimed the Seth Rich family were "not innocent bystanders" and also asserted they were "in possession of material evidence indicating that Seth Rich downloaded the DNC emails, sent them to WikiLeaks, and requested payment." In October 2020, Butowsky was described as "backing away" from the Rich case, due in part to Fox settling their lawsuit with the Rich family.

NPR later sued both Butowsky and his attorney Steven Biss for allegedly lying to the courts by making key allegations which they claimed were objectively false.

In January 2021, Butowsky issued an apology and retraction as part of settlement in a lawsuit filed by Aaron Rich, Seth's brother, against Butowksy and commentator Matt Couch in March 2018. The terms of settlement were not revealed. The financier stated, ""I take full responsibility for my comments and I apologize for any pain I have caused. I sincerely hope the Rich family is able to find out who murdered their son and bring this tragic chapter in their lives to a close."

== Publishing history ==
=== Books ===
- Wealth Mismanagement: A Wall Street Insider on the Dirty Secrets of Financial Advisers and How to Protect Your Portfolio ISBN 978-1642932348
- Never Go Broke: Investment Guide for Professional Athletes ISBN 979-8412643571

== Personal life ==
Butowsky lives in Plano, Texas, with his wife and two children.
