= Murder of Seth Rich =

2016 unsolved murder in Washington, D.C., US

- Location: Bloomingdale neighborhood (Ward 5, Washington, D.C.)
- Date: July 10, 2016; 4:20 a.m. EST (approximate)
- Attack type: Homicide by shooting
- Perpetrator: Unknown
- Inquiry: Metropolitan Police Department of the District of Columbia
- Coroners: Office of the Chief Medical Examiner, Washington D.C.

The murder of Seth Rich occurred on July 10, 2016, at 4:20 a.m. in the Bloomingdale neighborhood of Washington, D.C. Rich died about an hour and a half after being shot twice in the back. The perpetrators were never apprehended; police suspected he had been the victim of an attempted robbery.

Rich, aged 27, was an employee of the Democratic National Committee (DNC), and his murder spawned several conspiracy theories, including the false claim, contradicted by the law enforcement branches that investigated the murder, that Rich had been involved with the leaked DNC emails in 2016. It was also contradicted by the July 2018 indictment of 12 Russian military intelligence agents for hacking the e-mail accounts and networks of Democratic Party officials and by the U.S. intelligence community's conclusion the leaked DNC emails were part of Russian interference in the 2016 United States elections. Fact-checking websites like PolitiFact, Snopes, and FactCheck.org stated that the theories were false and unfounded. The New York Times, the Los Angeles Times and The Washington Post wrote that the promotion of these conspiracy theories was an example of fake news.

Rich's family denounced the conspiracy theorists and said that those individuals were exploiting their son's death for political gain, and their spokesperson called the conspiracy theorists "disgusting sociopaths". They requested a retraction and apology from Fox News after the network promoted the conspiracy theory, and sent a cease and desist letter to the investigator Fox News used. The investigator stated that he had no evidence to back up the claims which Fox News attributed to him. Fox News issued a retraction, but did not apologize or publicly explain what went wrong. In response, the Rich family sued Fox News in March 2018 for having engaged in "extreme and outrageous conduct" by fabricating the story defaming their son and thereby intentionally inflicting emotional distress on them. Fox News reached a seven-figure settlement with the Rich family in October 2020.

== Seth Rich ==
=== Early life and career ===
Rich grew up in a Jewish family in Omaha, Nebraska. He volunteered for the Nebraska Democratic Party, interned for Senator Ben Nelson, was active in Jewish outreach, and worked with the United States Census Bureau. In 2011, he graduated from Creighton University with a degree in political science. He moved to Washington, D.C., to work for pollster Greenberg Quinlan Rosner. In 2014, he began working for the Democratic National Committee (DNC) as the voter expansion data director. One of his tasks at the DNC was the development of a computer application to help voters locate polling stations.

=== Shooting and death ===
On Sunday, July 10, 2016, at 4:20 a.m., Rich was shot about a block from his apartment at the southwest corner of Flagler Place and W Street Northwest in the Bloomingdale neighborhood of Washington, D.C.

Earlier that night, he had been at Lou's City Bar, a sports pub 1.8 miles (2.9 km) from his apartment, in Columbia Heights, where he was a regular customer. He left when the bar was closing, at about 1:30 or 1:45 a.m. Police were alerted to gunfire at 4:20 a.m. by an automated gunfire locator. Less than one minute after the gunfire, police officers found Rich conscious with gunshot wounds. He was taken to a nearby hospital, where he died over 1 1/2 hours after being shot. Rich was not shot in the head, which is seen as evidence against the shooting having been an "assassination". According to police, he died from two shots to the back and may have been killed in an attempted robbery. Residents noted the neighborhood had been plagued by robberies.

Rich's mother told NBC's Washington affiliate WRC-TV: "There had been a struggle. His hands were bruised, his knees are bruised, his face is bruised, and yet he had two shots to his back, and yet they never took anything ... They didn't finish robbing him, they just took his life." The police told the family they had found a surveillance recording showing a glimpse of the legs of two people who could be the killers.

== Aftermath ==
On the day after the shooting, DNC chair Debbie Wasserman Schultz issued a statement mourning his loss and praising Rich's work to support voter rights. Two days after the shooting, Hillary Clinton spoke of his death during a speech advocating limiting the availability of guns.

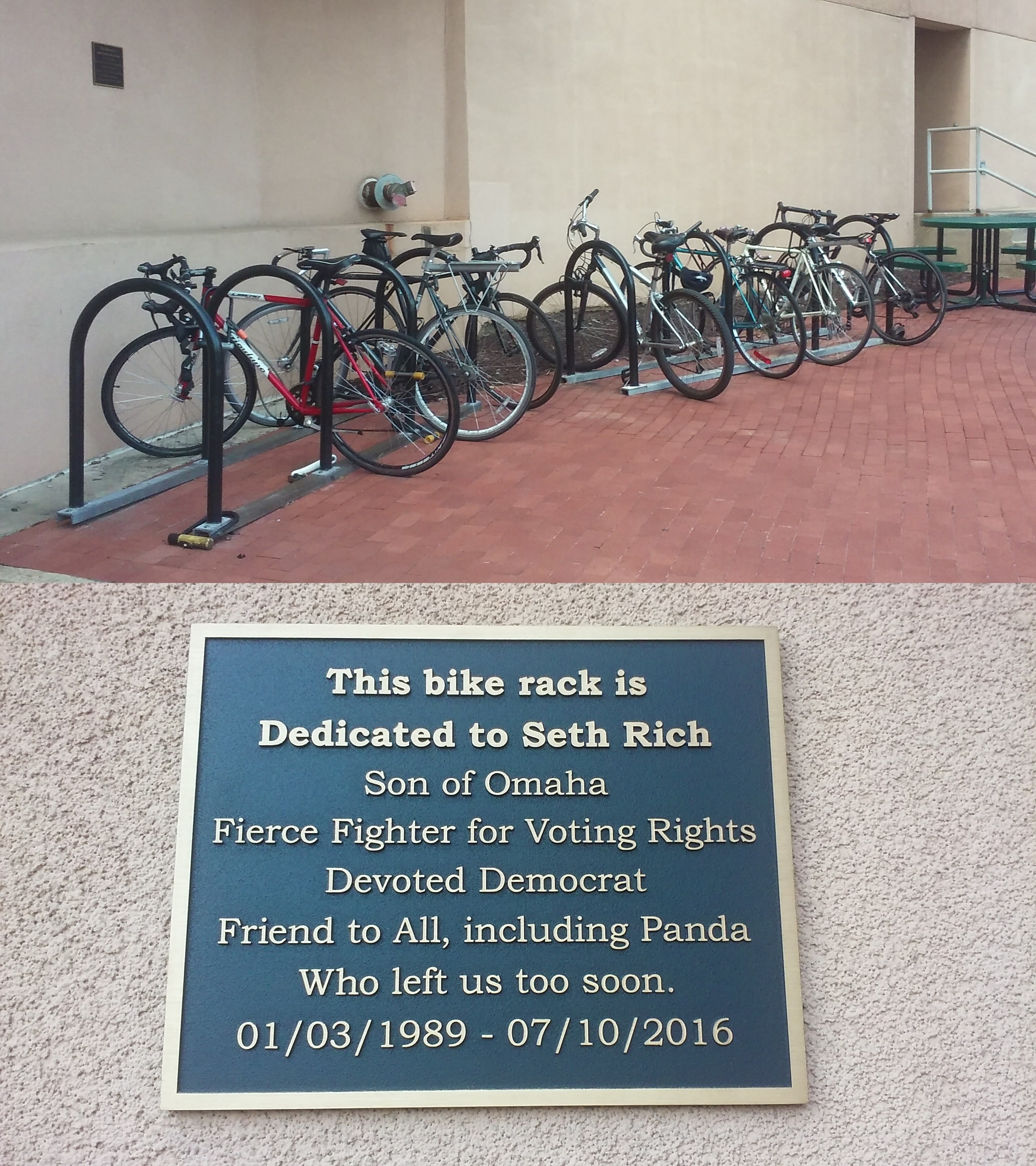
Bike rack and plaque outside the DNC headquarters

In September 2016, Rich's parents and girlfriend appeared on the syndicated television show Crime Watch Daily to speak about the murder case. In October 2016, a plaque and bike rack outside the DNC headquarters were dedicated to Rich's memory. In February 2017, the Beth El Synagogue in Omaha named after Rich an existing scholarship that helps Jewish children attend summer camps.

The Rich family accepted the pro bono public relations services of Republican lobbyist Jack Burkman in September 2016. The Rich family and Burkman held a joint press conference on the murder in November 2016. In January 2017, Burkman launched an advertising campaign in Northwest D.C. searching for information regarding Seth's death. This included billboard advertisements and canvassing with flyers. In late February, Burkman told media outlets he had a lead that the Russian government was involved in Rich's death, and the Rich family then distanced itself from Burkman. On March 19, 2017, Rich's brother, Aaron, started a GoFundMe campaign to try to raise $200,000 for private investigation, public outreach activities, and a reward fund.

The Rich family was approached by Ed Butowsky (a friend of Trump advisor Steve Bannon and a frequent Fox News contributor), who recommended having Fox News contributor and former homicide detective Rod Wheeler investigate Seth's murder. Butowsky said Wheeler had been recommended to him. The family gave Wheeler permission to investigate, though they did not hire him. When questioned by CNN, Butowsky denied involvement in the case, but later admitted he was involved and had offered to pay Wheeler's fees. After Wheeler asserted links between Rich and Wikileaks in a Fox affiliate interview on May 15, 2017—an assertion he later backpedaled from—the family spokesman said that the family regretted working with Wheeler. Wheeler then sued Fox News on August 1, 2017, for mental anguish and emotional distress, alleging that he had been misquoted in a story that was then published on the urging of Trump.

== Rewards ==
The Metropolitan Police Department of the District of Columbia (MPDC) posted its customary reward of $25,000 for information about the death.

On August 9, 2016, WikiLeaks announced a $20,000 reward for information about Rich's murder leading to a conviction. Rich's family said they were unable to verify this reward offer. WikiLeaks stated that this offer should not be taken as implying Rich had been involved in leaking information to it.

In November 2016, Republican lobbyist Jack Burkman said he was personally offering a $100,000 reward in addition to those announced by the police department and WikiLeaks, and he added another $5,000 to his offer in December and another $25,000 in January. Burkman said he hoped the money would help "get to the truth of what happened here and will either debunk the conspiracy theories or validate them."

== Conspiracy theories ==
=== Origins ===
==== Beginnings on social media ====
Political conspiracy theories and racially charged comments started to appear on social media the day after Rich's death. Within days, right-wing conspiracy theories began circulating, including false claims that his murder was connected to the DNC email leak of 2016 or the FBI's investigation of the Clinton Foundation.

A post on Twitter before Rich's memorial service spread the idea that his killing was a political assassination. Subsequently, the conspiracy theory was spread on the subreddit /r/The_Donald, and on July 29, 2016, the website Heat Street reported on these Reddit posts. Reddit users attempted to tie the homicide to the Clinton body count conspiracy theory. The conspiracy theory was later popularized by Donald Trump political adviser Roger Stone via his Twitter account.

According to British journalist Duncan Campbell, the Russian intelligence agency, GRU, tried to implicate Rich as the source of the stolen DNC emails in order to draw attention away from themselves as the real perpetrators of the theft. Datestamps on the DNC files were altered to show the data had been obtained on July 5, 2016, five days before Rich's death, and the time zone was changed to Eastern Time, within which Washington, D.C., falls. Guccifer 2.0, the alleged GRU front that provided the emails to Wikileaks, then reported that Rich had been their source. Based partly on their acceptance of the false dates, some experts then concluded that the emails had been copied in the DNC offices, and had not been hacked from outside.

==== WikiLeaks statements ====
Julian Assange, the Australian founder of WikiLeaks, fueled the speculation in an interview with Nieuwsuur published on August 9, 2016, which touched on the topic of risks faced by WikiLeaks' sources. Unbidden, Assange brought up the case of Seth Rich. When asked directly whether Rich was a source, Assange said "we don't comment on who our sources are". Subsequent statements by WikiLeaks emphasized that the organization was not naming Rich as a source.

According to the Mueller Report, WikiLeaks had received an email containing an encrypted file named "wk dnc link I .txt.gpg" from the Guccifer 2.0 GRU persona on July 14, which was four days after Seth Rich died. In April 2018, Twitter direct messages revealed that even as Assange was suggesting publicly that WikiLeaks had obtained emails from Seth Rich, Assange was trying to obtain more emails from Guccifer 2.0, who was at the time already suspected of being linked to Russian intelligence. BuzzFeed described the messages as "the starkest proof yet that Assange knew a likely Russian government hacker had the Democrat leaks he wanted. And they reveal the deliberate bad faith with which Assange fed the groundless claims that Rich was his source, even as he knew the documents' origin." Mike Gottlieb, a lawyer for Rich's brother, noted that WikiLeaks received the file of stolen documents from the Russian hackers on July 14, four days after Rich was shot. Gottlieb described the chronology as "damning".

Julian Assange not only knew that a murdered Democratic National Committee staffer wasn't his source for thousands of hacked party emails, he was in active contact with his real sources in Russia's GRU months after Seth Rich's death. At the same time he was publicly working to shift blame onto the slain staffer “to obscure the source of the materials he was releasing,” Special Counsel Robert Mueller asserts in his final report on Russia's role in the 2016 presidential election.

==== Propagation by right-wing media and venues ====
The conspiracy theories were promoted by Mike Cernovich, Sean Hannity, Geraldo Rivera, Kim Dotcom, Paul Joseph Watson, Newt Gingrich, Jack Posobiec, Tim Pool, and others.

The same venues that fomented the false Pizzagate conspiracy theory helped to promulgate the Seth Rich murder conspiracy theories, and each shared similar features. Both were promoted by individuals subscribing to far-right politics, and by campaign officials and individuals appointed to senior-level national security roles by Donald Trump. After prior coordination on Facebook, each theory was spread on Twitter by automated bots using a branded hashtag, with the goal of becoming a trending topic. Both the Pizzagate conspiracy theory and the Seth Rich murder conspiracy theory were spread in the subreddit forum /r/The_Donald. In both conspiracy theories, the promoters attempted to shift the burden of proof — asking others to attempt to disprove their claims, without citing substantiated evidence. Slate's Elliot Hannon called the claims about Seth Rich a "PizzaGate-like conspiracy theory surrounding Rich's death", The Huffington Post described it as "the 'alt-right' idiocy of Pizzagate all over again", NPR's David Folkenflik said Fox News coverage of it "evokes the pizza-gate terrible allegations utterly unfounded", and Margaret Sullivan wrote for The Washington Post: "The Seth Rich lie has become the new Comet Ping Pong ... Crazy, baseless and dangerous."

On July 9, 2019, a Yahoo! News article stated that an alleged Russian Foreign Intelligence Service bulletin dated July 13, 2016 was the original source of the conspiracy theory. An analysis by the Washington Post disputed the conclusion while crediting the report for highlighting the roles played by InfoWars, Fox News, and Hannity in promoting the misinformation.

=== Debunking ===
Law enforcement stated that the conspiracy theories were unfounded, while fact-checking websites like PolitiFact.com, Snopes.com, and FactCheck.org came to the conclusion that the theories were false and baseless.

The Metropolitan Police Department of the District of Columbia described the murder as related to a bungled attempted robbery, and said "the assertions put forward by Mr. Wheeler are unfounded." Assistant Police Chief Peter Newsham said the police had no information suggesting a connection between Rich's death and data obtained by WikiLeaks, and MPD officers considered the murder to be the result of a botched robbery attempt. A spokesman for the Washington, D.C., mayor's office, who said, "All claims made by Mr. Wheeler are false and take fake news to a whole new level. The family deserves better and everyday MPD continues to work diligently to solve this case."

People who worked with Rich said he didn't have access to the emails on the DNC server and was not an expert computer hacker helping to leak information to foreigners. Andrew Therriault, a data scientist who had mentored Rich, said although he had recently been working as a programmer, he did not have a programming background; another co-worker said Rich was very upset when he heard hackers associated with Russian intelligence services had broken into the DNC computers and could be interfering with the election.

Conspiracy theories falsely claimed that the FBI was investigating the case; in fact, the DC's MPD investigated the murder, and the FBI was not involved.

Newt Gingrich promoted the conspiracy theory of a tie between Rich and Wikileaks, claiming that Rich "apparently was assassinated" subsequent to "having given WikiLeaks something like ... 53,000 [DNC] emails and 17,000 attachments". No evidence supported Gingrich's false and baseless claim, and there was no evidence of any link between Rich and Wikileaks.

The fabrications were described as fake news and falsehoods by The New York Times. The New York Times cited the conspiracy theories as an example of the persistence of false claims, concluding: "fake news dies hard". The Los Angeles Times called the conspiracy theories "unsubstantiated rumors".

The Washington Post cited the conspiracy theories as an example of the power of fake news to spread virally online. The paper used the example as a case study of the persistence of fake news, and found that television news media can be a soft target for such false stories. The Washington Post further found that the proliferation of fake news via Facebook had decreased, but remained powerful on Twitter due to spread via online bots. They found that the conspiracy theories with the largest potential to spread on the Internet were those that held attraction for both the alt-right movements and the political left wing. The Washington Post concluded that even if a particular false story had been sufficiently debunked, such fact-checking was unable to stop the spread of the falsehoods online.

=== Retracted reporting ===
==== Uncorroborated Fox News story ====
On May 15, 2017, Fox 5 DC (WTTG) reported the uncorroborated and later largely retracted claims by Rod Wheeler, a Fox News contributor and former homicide detective, that there was evidence Seth Rich had contacted WikiLeaks and that law enforcement were covering this up, claims that were never independently verified by Fox. The next day, Fox News published a lead story on its website and provided extensive coverage on its cable news channel about what it later said were Wheeler's uncorroborated claims about the murder of Seth Rich; in the lead story Fox News removed from their website a few days later, they stated that Wheeler's claims had been "corroborated by a federal investigator who spoke to Fox News." In reporting these claims, the Fox News report re-ignited conspiracy theories about the killing. According to NPR, within a day of the original Fox report, "Google searches for Rich had overtaken searches for James Comey, even amid continuous news about the former FBI director's conversations with Trump." The Washington Post's Callum Borchers noted Fox News chose to lead with this story at a time when most other media outlets were covering Donald Trump's disclosure of classified information to Russia.

Other news organizations revealed Wheeler was a Donald Trump supporter, a paid Fox News contributor, and according to NBC News had "developed a reputation for making outlandish claims, such as one appearance on Fox News in 2007 in which he warned that underground networks of pink pistol-toting lesbian gangs were raping young women". The Washington Post noted it is "rare for a news organization to have such a close relationship with the people it is covering", as Wheeler was "playing three roles at once: as a Fox source, as a paid contributor to the network and as a supposedly independent investigator of the murder". When Wheeler appeared on Sean Hannity's Fox News shows, these multiple roles were not disclosed to viewers. After Wheeler's Fox News interview on May 15, 2017, Brad Bauman, a communications professional and spokesman for the Rich family, said the family was asking Fox News and the Fox affiliate to retract their reports and apologize for damaging their son's legacy.

The family spokesperson, the Washington, D.C., police department, the Washington, D.C., mayor's office, the FBI, and law enforcement sources familiar with the case all disputed Wheeler's claims. The family said, "We are a family who is committed to facts, not fake evidence that surfaces every few months to fill the void and distract law enforcement and the general public from finding Seth's murderers." Bauman criticized Fox News for its reporting, saying he believed that the outlet was motivated by a desire to deflect attention from the Trump-Russia story: "I think there's a very special place in hell for people that would use the memory of a murder victim in order to pursue a political agenda."

Later that day, Wheeler told CNN he had no evidence that Rich had contacted Wikileaks. Wheeler claimed that Fox had presented his quotes misleadingly and that he only learned about the possible existence of the evidence from a Fox News reporter. Despite this, Sean Hannity's show and Fox & Friends continued to promote the conspiracy theory for the remainder of the week. On May 18, 2016, Hannity's guest on the show was Jay Sekulow who said that Rich's killing "... undercuts this whole Russia argument;" neither one mentioned that Sekulow had just been hired as one of Trump's lead lawyers in the Mueller investigation into Russian interference in the 2016 United States elections. Former House Speaker Newt Gingrich and Geraldo Rivera took part in spreading the conspiracy. Hannity had on his program Tom Fitton of Judicial Watch, who said the organization filed Freedom of Information Act requests for documents from Washington, D.C., mayor Muriel E. Bowser, and from the Metropolitan Police. Sean Hannity furthermore promoted the uncorroborated claims of Kim Dotcom, a New Zealand resident sought by the United States on fraud charges who claimed without evidence that Rich had been in contact with him before his death. Fox News host Julie Roginsky was critical of the conspiracy theory peddlers, stating on Twitter and on her television show: "The exploitation of a dead man whose family has begged conspiracy theorists to stop is really egregious. Please stop." Fox News was also criticized by conservative outlets, such as the Weekly Standard, National Review, and conservative columnists, such as Jennifer Rubin, Michael Gerson, and John Podhoretz. In September 2017, NPR noted that Fox News had yet to apologize for its false story or explain what went wrong; "When a story of this scale crumbles, most news organizations feel obligated to explain what happened and why. Not so far at Fox."

By November 2020, Malia Zimmerman, the reporter behind the retracted Fox News story, was no longer working at Fox.

==== Cease and desist letter and Fox News retraction ====
On May 19, 2017, an attorney for the Rich family sent a cease and desist letter to Wheeler.

Fox News issued a retraction of the story on May 23, 2017, and removed the original article and did not apologize or specify what went wrong or how it did so. Despite this, Hannity, who pushed the theory, remained unapologetic, saying "I retracted nothing" and "I am not going to stop trying to find the truth." In their May 23 statement, Fox News said, "The article was not initially subjected to the high degree of editorial scrutiny we require for all our reporting. Upon appropriate review, the article was found not to meet those standards and has since been removed." Media ethics writer Kelly McBride criticized the retraction as "woefully inadequate", writing that it did not specify exactly what was inaccurate or provide correct information in place of the retracted story.

The same day, Hannity stated on his show that he would cease discussing the issue. Hannity said his decision to cease commenting on the matter was related to the family of the murder victim: "Out of respect for the family's wishes, for now, I am not discussing the matter at this time." In the same statement wherein he promised to cease discussion of the topic, he vowed to pursue facts in the future: "I promise you I am not going to stop trying to find the truth." Several advertisers including Crowne Plaza Hotels, Cars.com, Leesa Mattress, USAA, Peloton and Casper Sleep pulled their marketing from his program on Fox News. Crowne Plaza Hotels later said that it was not their policy to advertise on political commentary shows and that they had not been aware of their sponsorship of the show. USAA soon returned to advertising on Fox News after receiving customer input.

==== InfoWars retraction ====
In 2019, Jerome Corsi and InfoWars apologized and retracted a story promoting conspiracy theories about the murder of Seth Rich. The retraction was published on the front page of InfoWars, where Corsi said that "his allegations were not based upon any independent factual knowledge." Corsi said that he retracted the story because it relied on information that the Washington Times had retracted, but still thought that investigators should look into whether Seth Rich played a role.

=== Wheeler lawsuit ===
On August 1, 2017, Rod Wheeler, the private investigator hired by Butowsky who was the first to claim links between Seth Rich's murder and the DNC hack on Fox, but who later appeared to retract his claims, filed a lawsuit (Case 1:17-cv-05807 Southern District of New York) in which 21st Century Fox, the Fox News Channel, Fox News reporter Malia Zimmerman and Ed Butowsky were named as defendants, stating that quotes attributed to him in the original Fox News piece were fabricated. The lawsuit also alleged that the fabricated quotes were included in the Fox News story at the urging of the Trump White House.

Text messages and audio apparently supporting this assertion were included in the filing of the lawsuit. About a month before the story was aired on Fox News, Wheeler and Butowsky met at the White House with the White House press secretary, Sean Spicer, to review the planned story on Seth Rich's murder. After talking to Wheeler and Butowsky, Zimmerman sent Wheeler a draft of a story without any quotes from Wheeler on May 11. On May 14, Butowsky texted Wheeler saying "Not to add any more pressure but the president just read the article. He wants the article out immediately. It's now all up to you. But don't feel the pressure." Butowsky also left a voicemail for Wheeler which said "We have the full, uh, attention of the White House on this. And tomorrow, let's close this deal, whatever we've got to do." Butowsky said Seymour Hersh confirmed a link between Rich and the FBI. Hersh confirmed the conversation with Butowsky but told NPR the link was "gossip" and that Butowsky exaggerated its significance.

In an email to Fox News, Butowsky also wrote about the purpose behind the Seth Rich story: "One of the big conclusions we need to draw from this is that the Russians did not hack our computer systems and ste[a]l emails and there was no collusion (between) Trump and the Russians." He also instructed Wheeler that "[T]he narrative in the interviews you might use is that you and [Zimmerman's] work prove that the Russians didn't hack into the DNC and steal the emails and impact our elections ... If you can, try to highlight this puts the Russian hacking story to rest."

When the story aired on Fox News, it included supposed quotes from Wheeler and was written as if the accusations against the DNC came from him. Wheeler alleges that the quotes were fabricated and should not have been attributed to him.

In later recordings Butowsky told Wheeler that the claims being attributed to him were false but says that "One day you're going to win an award for having said those things you didn't say." He also says "I know that's not true, if I'm under oath, I would say I never heard him say that."

The lawsuit was dismissed in August 2018, alongside Rich's family lawsuit against Fox, with the presiding judge ruling that there was no evidence that Fox has manipulated claims he had made on recordings, while other statements that Wheeler claimed were defamatory were considered opinion. However, information learned from the discovery phase of the lawsuit on how Fox News was handling the story were subsequently used by Rich's family in its lawsuit against the network after they successfully appealed the dismissal.

== Family's reactions ==
In May 2017, Seth Rich's brother Aaron Rich issued a statement saying, "We simply want to find his killers and grieve. Instead, we are stuck having to constantly fight against non-facts, baseless allegations, and general stupidity to defend my brother's name and legacy." The family spokesperson said "At this point, only people with transparent political agendas or sociopaths are still perpetuating Seth Rich conspiracies."

His parents authored a piece in The Washington Post on May 23, 2017, titled: "We're Seth Rich's parents. Stop politicizing our son's murder," in which they wrote:

We are asking you to please consider our feelings and words. There are people who are using our beloved Seth's memory and legacy for their own political goals, and they are using your outrage to perpetuate our nightmare. We ask those purveying falsehoods to give us peace, and to give law enforcement the time and space to do the investigation they need to solve our son's murder.

In March 2018, Aaron Rich sued Butowsky, Couch, America First Media, and The Washington Times for suggesting he had played a role in the purported theft of emails from the DNC. On October 1, 2018, as part of a settlement they had reached with Aaron Rich, The Washington Times retracted the relevant articles and apologized to Rich and his family.

=== Lawsuit against Fox News ===
In March 2018, Rich's family filed a lawsuit against Fox News, Fox reporter Malia Zimmerman, and Fox contributor Ed Butowsky, for publishing a news report about Seth Rich. The suit alleges that the report fueled conspiracy theories about Rich's death and caused the family emotional distress. Judge George B. Daniels dismissed the lawsuit in August 2018 alongside the case against Fox News from Wheeler. Judge Daniels ruled that, although it was reasonable for plaintiffs to believe their son's death was being used for political purposes, the plaintiffs failed to allege "intentional infliction" of emotional distress on the part of defendants, as that standard is determined under New York state law: "defamatory statements to news outlets 'fall well short of meeting the high standards for extreme and outrageous conduct.' They would have had to prove more extreme and persistent distress under the law."

The United States Court of Appeals for the Second Circuit overturned the dismissal in September 2019 saying, "the Riches plausibly alleged what amounted to a campaign of emotional torture." In subsequent proceedings, the Rich family used information from the failed Wheeler lawsuit to support further allegations towards Fox News. Among that information included the level of involvement that Butowsky had in preparing and coaching the Fox News hosts in the days before they broke their version of the Seth Rich story, his hiring of Wheeler, and his meeting with Spicer. On October 12, 2020, Fox News reached a settlement with the Rich family. The terms of the settlement were not disclosed, but were reported to be in the seven figures. The settlement also dismissed the actions against Zimmerman and Butowsky, which eliminated the need for Fox News hosts like Hannity and Dobbs to give testimony. The settlement contained the provision that it had to be kept secret for a month.

== Documentaries ==
In April 2018, the BBC broadcast the documentary Conspiracy Files: Murder in Washington examining the death of Rich and subsequent theories about the death.

In May 2022, an episode of the Netflix documentary series Web of Make Believe: Death, Lies and the Internet examined the murder of Seth Rich, the unfounded conspiracy theories and his family.

== See also ==
- Conspiracy theories in United States politics
- Crime in the District of Columbia
- Fake news in the United States
- Fringe theory
- Furtive fallacy
- List of conspiracy theories
- List of conspiracy theories promoted by Donald Trump
- List of unsolved deaths
