= Allegations of Barack Obama spying on Donald Trump =

Claims that US President spied on successor

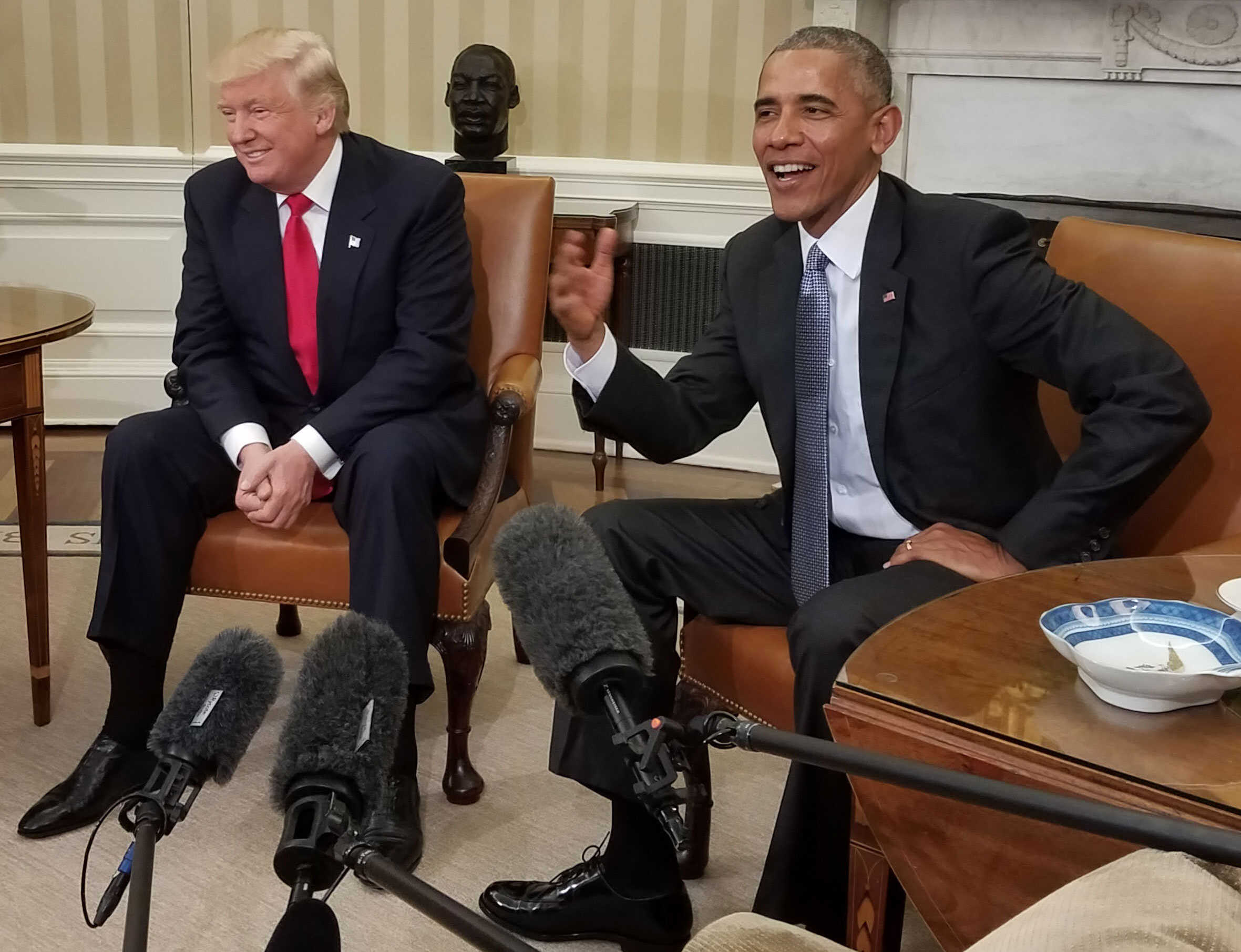
Then-president Barack Obama meets with then-President-elect Donald Trump in the Oval Office.

As part of a larger conspiracy theory, Donald Trump falsely posited that Barack Obama had spied on him, which Trump described as "the biggest political crime in American history, by far." The series of accusations have been nicknamed Obamagate. Obama had served as the 44th President of the United States from 2009 until 2017, when Trump succeeded him; Trump served as the 45th president until 2021 (first presidency) and later he was re-elected in 2024 as the 47th president (second presidency).

During key points of the 2020 campaign, including the Republican National Convention and both presidential debates, Trump frequently repeated this theory, falsely claiming "they spied on my campaign" in reference to these allegations. The specific allegations of inappropriate politically motivated surveillance or "spying" all involve the Federal Bureau of Investigation's Crossfire Hurricane investigation of the Trump campaign and transition and their ties to Russia. No evidence has been found that legal surveillance, as part of Crossfire Hurricane, was at the direction of Obama, Obama administration political officials or improper deep state influence, or that the Steele dossier was used to launch the Russia probe, or that the surveillance was designed to surveil the Trump campaign and Trump White House transition team for political purposes.

Trump has claimed that as part of Crossfire Hurricane, his "wires" at Trump Tower were wiretapped. This was refuted by Trump's own Justice Department. In addition, Trump has claimed that after the Crossfire Hurricane investigation recorded Michael Flynn's conversations with Russian ambassador Sergey Kislyak, Flynn was improperly "unmasked". This was also refuted by the Trump Justice Department. Specific actions undertaken by the FBI that have been highlighted include the use of an informant who met with Trump advisors Sam Clovis, George Papadopoulos, and Carter Page, as well as obtaining a FISA warrant to legally surveil Carter Page after he left the Trump campaign.

The Inspector General report on the Crossfire Hurricane investigation did not find evidence that "political bias or improper motivation influenced the FBI's decision to seek FISA authority on Carter Page", but did point out serious inconsistencies and improper procedures that were followed with regard to the obtaining of the warrants. The Inspector General wrote that his review "found no evidence that the FBI attempted to place any" FBI source in the Trump campaign. The review also "found no evidence" that the FBI had tried to "recruit members of the Trump campaign" to serve as their sources. Finally, the review did not produce evidence that "political bias or improper motivations influenced" the FBI's usage of confidential sources or undercover agents for interactions with members of Trump's campaign.

In July 2025, Tulsi Gabbard distributed documents that she insinuated placed guilt for certain members of the Obama administration, that she termed "treasonous", and were a part of the Obamagate conspiracy theory. Several days later Trump accused and affirmed Gabbard's allegations during a July 22 meeting with the Philippine President Bongbong Marcos, where he claimed Obama attempted a failed "coup" in the 2016 election which implicated former President Obama for treason. That same day a spokesperson for Obama's office stated that normally out of respect for the office of the Presidency, Obama's office rarely made public comments, however as Trump's claims were both "outrageous" and "bizarre" the situation called for a response. The spokesperson added that these allegations were attempts at "distraction". Political commentators have suggested that by distraction, that Trump was using the Obamagate conspiracy theory to deflect allegations that Trump was involved with the Jeffrey Epstein sex trafficking scandal.

== Background ==
According to the results of a U.S. Senate investigation, the government of Russia directly and through intermediaries sought influence within 2016 U.S. presidential election candidate Donald Trump's political campaigns and also to sow discord within American society. Thus, actions taken by the then-current Obama Administration in its investigations into these alleged Russian influences provide the bases for claims that it spied on Trump.

== Conspiracy theory elements ==
- Crossfire Hurricane (FBI investigation)
- Deep state in the United States
- Inspector General report on the Crossfire Hurricane investigation
- Robert Mueller's Special Counsel investigation
- Russia investigation origins conspiracy theory
- Spygate (conspiracy theory)
- Steele dossier, written by former MI6 Agent Christopher Steele
- Trump Tower wiretapping allegations
- United States v. Flynn
- Unmasking aides to Donald Trump

=== Trump campaign figures allegedly spied upon ===
- Sam Clovis, national co-chair
- Michael Flynn, campaign advisor and future National Security Advisor
- Paul Manafort, campaign manager
- Carter Page, foreign policy advisor
- George Papadopoulos, foreign policy advisor

=== Obama administration figures allegedly involved ===
- John Brennan, Director of the Central Intelligence Agency
- James Clapper, Director of National Intelligence
- James Comey, Director of the Federal Bureau of Investigation
- Stefan Halper, FBI Informant
- Bruce Ohr, Justice Department official
- Susan Rice, National Security Advisor
- Peter Strzok, FBI Counterintelligence Division
- Sally Yates, United States Deputy Attorney General
- Unnamed U.S. government investigator, used by the FBI as an informant

== Investigations launched ==
=== Trump administration officials or its allies involved ===
- William Barr, United States Attorney General
- Doug Collins, former Ranking Member of the United States House Committee on the Judiciary
- John Durham, United States Attorney
- Lindsey Graham, Chairman of the United States Senate Committee on the Judiciary
- Michael E. Horowitz, United States Department of Justice Office of the Inspector General
- Ron Johnson, Chairman of the United States Senate Committee on Homeland Security and Governmental Affairs
- Jim Jordan, Ranking Member of the United States House Committee on the Judiciary
- Devin Nunes, Ranking Member of the United States House Permanent Select Committee on Intelligence, via the Nunes memo

== Timeline ==
=== May 2020: Trump allegations ===
On May 10, 2020—one day after former president Barack Obama criticized the Trump administration's handling of the COVID-19 pandemic—Trump posted a one-word tweet: "OBAMAGATE!" On May 11, Philip Rucker of The Washington Post asked Trump what crime former president Barack Obama committed. Trump's reply was: "Obamagate. It's been going on for a long time ... from before I even got elected and it's a disgrace that it happened.... Some terrible things happened and it should never be allowed to happen in our country again." When Rucker again asked what the crime was, Trump said: "You know what the crime is. The crime is very obvious to everybody. All you have to do is read the newspapers, except yours." On May 15, Trump tweeted that Obamagate was the "greatest political scandal in the history of the United States." This was the third time Trump claimed to be suffering from a scandal of such magnitude, after previously giving Spygate and the Russia investigation similar labels. Also on May 15, Trump linked Obamagate to the "persecution" of Michael Flynn, and a missing 302 form.

Trump called for Congress to summon Obama to testify about "the biggest political crime". Senator Lindsey Graham, chair of the Senate Judiciary Committee, said that he did not expect to summon Obama, but would summon other Obama administration officials. Meanwhile, Attorney General William Barr stated that he did not "expect" Obama to be investigated for a crime. Some of Trump's allies have suggested that the "crime" involved the FBI launching an investigation into incoming national security advisor Michael Flynn, or possibly the "unmasking" by outgoing Obama officials to find out the name of a person who was reported in intelligence briefings to be conversing with the Russian ambassador.

In a May 2020 op-ed at the news website RealClearPolitics, Charles Lipson, professor emeritus of political science at the University of Chicago analyzed the content of "Obamagate". He claimed that the concept refers to three accusations: (1) The Obama administration conducted mass surveillance through the NSA; (2) the Obama administration used surveillance against Trump's 2016 presidential campaign, and (3) the Obama administration did not transfer power seamlessly to the new Trump administration. Lipson further claimed that "these abuses didn’t simply follow each other; their targets, goals, and principal players overlapped. Taken together, they represent some of the gravest violations of constitutional norms and legal protections in American history".

The Associated Press (AP) in May 2020 addressed Obamagate in a fact check, stating that there was "no evidence" of Trump's suggestion that "the disclosure of Flynn's name as part of legal U.S. surveillance of foreign targets was criminal and motivated by partisan politics." AP stated that there is not only "nothing illegal about unmasking," but also that the unmasking of Flynn was approved using the National Security Agency's "standard process." Unmasking is allowed if officials feel that it is needed to understand the collected intelligence. AP further pointed out that the Trump administration was conducting even more unmasking than the Obama administration in the final year of Obama's presidency.

In May, attorney general Bill Barr appointed federal prosecutor John Bash to examine unmasking conducted by the Obama administration.

=== August 2020: Yates testimony ===
The concept underlies in part a 2020 U.S. Senate investigation into the 2016–onward FBI's Crossfire Hurricane investigation. Former deputy attorney general Sally Yates on August 5, 2020, testified before the Committee that investigators were concerned that the national security adviser to President-elect Trump, Michael Flynn, was conversing in private with the Russian ambassador. According to Yates, Obama was interested in whether Flynn ought to be considered a safe recipient for sensitive briefings and Obama "did not in any way attempt to direct or influence any kind of investigation. Something like that would have set off alarms for me." (According to news reports, the belief that Flynn may have violated the Logan Act – a rarely prosecuted and vague law which constrains individuals from countervailing the existing foreign policy of the United States by way of secretive meetings – supplied the initial rationale for the FBI to target Flynn.)

=== September 2020: Accusations of political motives ===
Accusations have been leveled that Senate Republicans used investigations of "Obamagate" to help provide the Donald Trump 2020 presidential campaign with talking points.

In September, Sen. Ron Johnson, Chairman of the Senate Homeland Security Committee, led Republicans on the committee in securing subpoenas to look into Trump's Obamagate claims. Johnson had received criticism for stating "the more that we expose of the corruption of the transition process between Obama and Trump, the more we expose of the corruption within those agencies, I would think it would certainly help Donald Trump win reelection and certainly be pretty good, I would say, evidence about not voting for Vice President Biden".

=== October 2020: Trump pushes for arrests ===
With the news that the Durham special counsel investigation into potential abuses within the Obama's administration's handling of the FBI's Crossfire Hurricane investigation would not produce a report or indictments before the 2020 presidential election, President Trump began publicly calling out Attorney General Bill Barr for lack of arrests of major political figures he believes were involved, including his 2020 opponent Joe Biden.

The Washington Post reported on October 13 that Bash's unmasking inquiry had concluded with no findings of substantive wrongdoing and no public report.

On October 25, Trump repeated his allegations in an interview on 60 Minutes, claiming "the biggest scandal was when they spied on my campaign. They spied on my campaign, and they got caught." Host Lesley Stahl challenged the assertion, claiming "there's no real evidence of that. This is 60 Minutes, and we can't put on things we can't verify." Trump disagreed, claiming "they spied on my campaign, and they got caught. And then they went much further than that, and they got caught. And you will see that, Lesley, and you know that, but you just don't want to put it on the air." The dispute was part of a contentious interview that ended with Trump walking out.

=== July 2025: Trump's second term Gabbard accusations and calls for investigation ===
On July 18, United States Director of National Intelligence Tulsi Gabbard distributed documents that she insinuated placed guilt for certain members of the Obama administration, that she termed "treasonous", and were a part of the Obamagate conspiracy theory. Several days later Trump accused and affirmed Gabbard's allegations during a July 22 meeting with the Philippine President Bongbong Marcos, where he falsely claimed Obama attempted a failed "coup" in the 2016 election which implicated former President Obama for treason. That same day a spokesperson for Obama's office stated that normally out of respect for the office of the Presidency, Obama's office rarely made public comments, however as Trump's false claims were both "outrageous" and "bizarre" the situation called for a response. The spokesperson added that these allegations were attempts at "distraction". Political commentators have suggested that by distraction, that Trump was using the Obamagate conspiracy theory to deflect allegations that Trump was involved with the Jeffrey Epstein sex trafficking scandal. These false allegations were widely circulated earlier in July by former Trump ally and head of Department of Government Efficiency Elon Musk, who accused Trump of collusion with the deceased child predator and trafficker on Musk's X social media platform. The next day July 23, the Justice Department announced a strike force that would investigate the documents that Gabbard had discovered. On July 25, Trump stated that "He owes me, Obama owes me big," as Obama had immunity from prosecution due to Trump's legal battles for presidential immunity which were broadened on July 1 with the Trump v. United States ruling. Subsequently in late July, FBI director Kash Patel claimed to have discovered a secret room inside FBI headquarters at the Hoover Building. Inside the room was a collection of "Burner Bags" filled with documents which according to Patel were evidence of members of the Obama administration colluding in the Obamagate conspiracy. Patel claimed that there was a secret room in the Hoover Building in June during an interview with Joe Rogan on the Joe Rogan experience.

=== August 2025: Attorney General Bondi declares a grand jury investigation ===
In early August of 2025, United States Attorney General Pam Bondi decreed that a grand jury investigation would be initiated after Gabbard and Patel's allegations were made public. Later on August 10, Vice President JD Vance appeared in an interview on Fox News where he predicted that there would be numerous indictments coming in the near future, after Patel and Gabbard's alleged discoveries.

== See also ==
- List of conspiracy theories promoted by Donald Trump
- List of "-gate" scandals
