= Spygate =

Spygate may refer to:

- 2007: Formula One espionage controversy, allegations that confidential technical information was passed among F1 teams
- 2007: Spygate (NFL), the disciplining of the New England Patriots for unauthorized videotaping of an opposing team's hand signals during the 2007 season
- 2017: Houston Astros sign stealing scandal, the disciplining of the Houston Astros for illegally using technology to steal an opposing team's signs during the 2017 MLB season
- 2018: Spygate (conspiracy theory), allegations that a spy was embedded in Donald Trump's 2016 presidential campaign
- 2019: A controversy over observation of an opponent's practice session during the 2018–19 Leeds United F.C. season
- 2026: Southampton F.C. espionage incident, the expulsion of association football club Southampton from the 2026 EFL Championship play-off final for spying on training sessions
