= Trump Tower wiretapping allegations =

2017 US political controversy

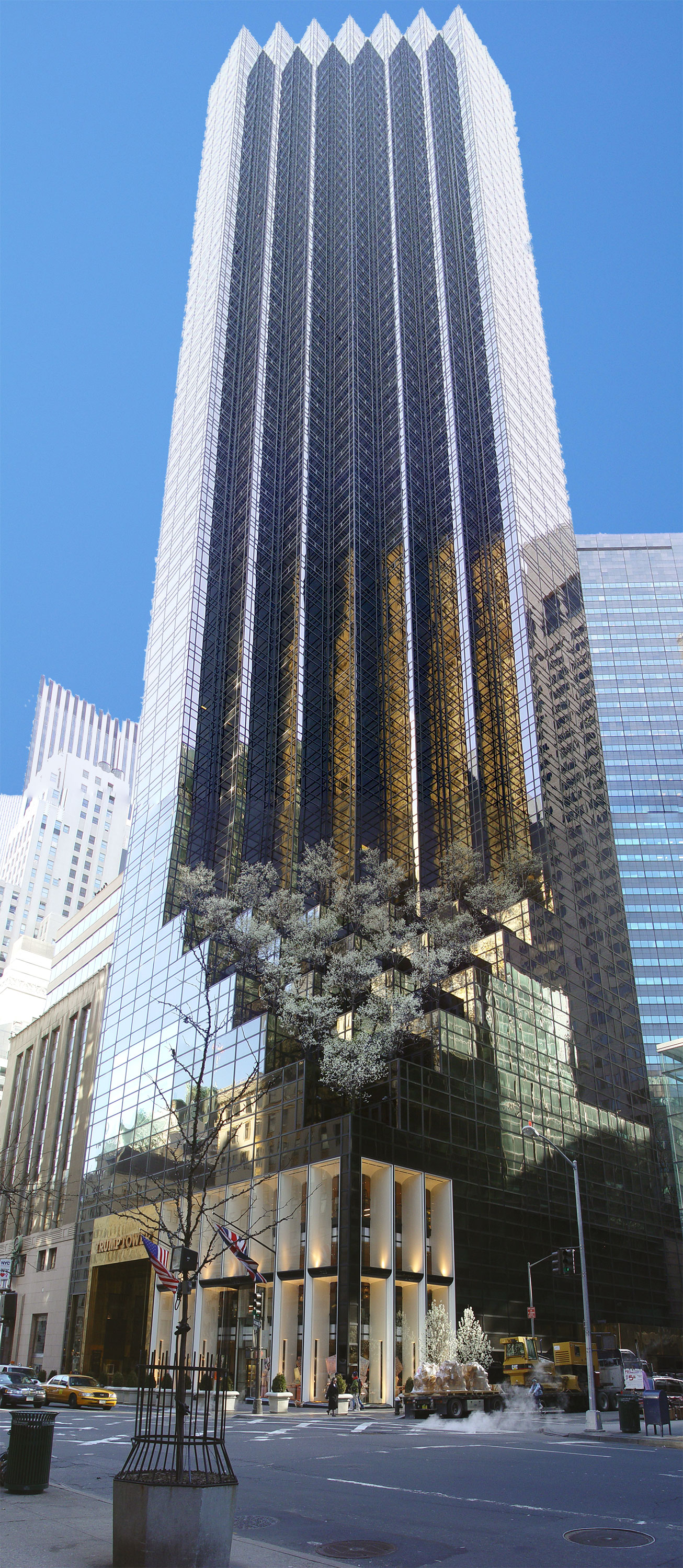
Trump Tower

On March 4, 2017, Donald Trump wrote a series of posts on his Twitter account that falsely accused former President Barack Obama's administration of wiretapping his "wires" at Trump Tower late in the 2016 presidential campaign. Trump called for a congressional investigation into the matter, and the Trump administration cited news reports to defend these accusations. His initial claims appeared to have been based on a Breitbart News article he had been given which repeated speculations made by conspiracy theorist Louise Mensch or on a Bret Baier interview, both of which occurred the day prior to his Tweets. By June 2020, no evidence had surfaced to support Trump's claim, which had been refuted by the Justice Department (DOJ).

Representative Devin Nunes, the then-chair of the House Permanent Select Committee on Intelligence, said he would investigate the claim. At a committee open hearing on March 20, 2017, FBI Director James Comey stated that neither the FBI nor the Justice Department possessed any information to support Donald Trump's wiretapping allegations. Nunes stated on March 23 that the Trump administration's communications might have been legally monitored during the transition period as part of an "incidental collection". Intelligence Committee leaders later said they found no evidence to support the claim.

The DOJ declared in a September 1, 2017, court filing that "both the FBI and NSD confirm that they have no records related to wiretaps as described by the March 4, 2017 tweets", and confirmed this in another court filing of October 19, 2018. On September 19, 2017 CNN reported that the FBI wiretapped Paul Manafort before and after the presidential election, extending into early 2017, although the report did not make clear whether Manafort was monitored during his tenure with the Trump campaign from March through August 2016. The CNN report also stated that the Manafort surveillance began after he became the subject of an FBI investigation in 2014. Some commentators cited this report as vindication for Trump's claims, while others noted that it did not confirm the accuracy of Trump's original tweets, and that it is still unknown whether any surveillance of Manafort took place at Trump Tower. Manafort owned a condominium in Trump Tower from 2006 until its seizure by federal authorities following his 2018 convictions. Furthermore, the 2017 CNN report cited as partial vindication for Trump was refuted by a 2019 investigation by the DOJ's Inspector General, which stated: "We are aware of no information indicating that the Crossfire Hurricane team requested or seriously considered FISA surveillance of Manafort or Flynn."

In a 2019 call in to Sean Hannity's show, Trump said that his original allegation of "wires tapped" was not literal, and that he really meant: "surveillance, spying you can sort of say whatever you want". Trump also said that his allegations were made "just on a little bit of a hunch and a little bit of wisdom maybe", and that he thought his allegations were "pretty insignificant" when he made them.

== Origin ==
On November 7, 2016, conspiracy theorist Louise Mensch reported in the right-leaning Heat Street, that the Federal Bureau of Investigation (FBI) had twice sought Foreign Intelligence Surveillance Act (FISA) warrants in connection with its investigation of the myriad links between Trump associates and Russian officials. According to Mensch, the first request for a warrant which "named Trump" was denied in June 2016 and, a second, more "narrowly drawn" request was granted in October 2016. Mensch wrote that this warrant gave "counter-intelligence permission to examine the activities of 'U.S. persons' in Donald Trump's campaign with ties to Russia", and to "look at the full content of emails and other related documents that may concern US persons". Mensch further claimed that the October warrant was granted in "connection with the investigation of suspected activity between the server [in Trump Tower] and two banks, SVB Bank and Alfa Bank", and that "it is thought in the intelligence community that the warrant covers any 'US person' connected to this investigation, and thus covers Donald Trump and at least three further men". She said her story was based on two anonymous "sources with links to the counter-intelligence community". Mensch's original article only discussed e-mail exchanges and did not use the term "wiretap".

On January 19, 2017, The New York Times published an article which used two headlines, with the print headline reading "Wiretapped Data Used in Inquiry of Trump Aides" (Note: The article states: "A version of this article appears in print on January 20, 2017, on Page A1 of the New York edition with the headline: 'Wiretapped Data Used in Inquiry of Trump Aides.'") and the article published online with the title "Intercepted Russian Communications Part of Inquiry Into Trump Associates". The article stated that "American law enforcement and intelligence agencies are examining intercepted [Russian] communications and financial transactions as part of a broad investigation into possible links between Russian officials and associates of President-elect Donald J. Trump, including his former campaign chairman Paul Manafort." The article also noted the uncertainty regarding the scope of the communications, stating: "It is not clear whether the intercepted [Russian] communications had anything to do with Mr. Trump's campaign, or Mr. Trump himself."

On March 3, Breitbart News, a far-right website known to publish conspiracy theories, ran an article by Joel Pollak headlined "Mark Levin to Congress: Investigate Obama's 'Silent Coup' vs. Trump." On the previous day, right-wing radio personality Mark Levin alleged that Obama and his allies were conducting a "silent coup" against Trump, and asked: "How many phone calls of Donald Trump, if any, have been intercepted by the administration and recorded by the Obama administration?" The claims were labeled conspiracy theories by CNN and the Los Angeles Times. The Breitbart article alleged that "the Obama administration is now monitoring an opposing presidential campaign using the high-tech surveillance powers of the federal intelligence services". Citing Mensch's November article, Breitbart claimed the existence of a June FISA request "to monitor communications involving Donald Trump and several advisers", and of an October FISA warrant "focused on a computer server in Trump Tower". Breitbart cited a January 11 National Review article, which speculated about alleged "wiretaps" of the Trump campaign and their legal ramifications. Like the Breitbart article, the National Review article had also extensively relied on Mensch's piece.

Like Mensch, McClatchy, BBC, and The Guardian reported on the existence of an October FISA warrant. However, these accounts differed substantially from Mensch's story with respect to the scope and purpose of the warrant. They alleged that the October warrant authorized to monitor financial transactions related to Russia — not communications. Unlike the derivative accounts in National Review and Breitbart, Mensch's original article did not use the term "wiretap" (implying voice telephone calls), but only made claims about e-mail exchanged with SVB Bank and the Russian Alfa-Bank. While Mensch did claim the e-mail server was located in Trump Tower, it was likely located in Lititz, Pennsylvania, as Trump outsourced e-mail to Listrak, which operates out of a data center there. Furthermore, The New York Times reported on October 31 that the FBI had concluded that the server traffic could have been explained by marketing emails or spam. Contrary to The Times, Mensch claimed that the server's activity remained suspicious enough to lead the FBI to request the FISA warrant.

On the March 3 Special Report program, host Brett Baier cited an article from the now-defunct Circa online newspaper, mentioning the same allegations as Mensch, McClatchy, BBC, and The Guardian, and asked Ryan: "Have you heard that?" Ryan responded: "Well, again, like I said, none of us in Congress or anybody I know in Congress has been presented with anything to the contrary of what you just said." However, there may have been a misunderstanding between Baier and Ryan throughout the interview, with Baier asking about undue surveillance of the Trump campaign, and Ryan responding that intelligence gathering had produced no evidence of collusion between Russia and Trump. Ryan stated, in response to a question about Trump's March 15 comments, that he had been unaware of any wiretapping allegations prior to his interview with Baier, and that "the intelligence committees ... have determined ... that no such wiretap existed."

The Breitbart article was circulated among White House staffers, and was reportedly given to Trump along with his morning newspapers and printouts. It was also reported that Trump watched the Bret Baier interview immediately before his tweets.

== Accusation ==
=== Initial claim ===
Avatar of Donald J. Trump

Donald J. Trump
(@realDonaldTrump)
tweeted:

Terrible! Just found out that Obama had my "wires tapped" in Trump Tower just before the victory. Nothing found. This is McCarthyism!

March 4, 2017

In a succession of tweets on March 4, 2017, (Note: The original tweets, in chronological order, are: @realDonaldTrump (March 4, 2017). "Terrible! Just found out that Obama had my "wires tapped" in Trump Tower just before the victory. Nothing found. This is McCarthyism!" (Tweet). Archived from the original on May 1, 2017 – via Twitter.; @realDonaldTrump (March 4, 2017). "Is it legal for a sitting President to be "wire tapping" a race for president prior to an election? Turned down by court earlier. A NEW LOW!" (Tweet). Archived from the original on May 1, 2017 – via Twitter.; @realDonaldTrump (March 4, 2017). "I'd bet a good lawyer could make a great case out of the fact that President Obama was tapping my phones in October, just prior to Election!" (Tweet). Archived from the original on May 1, 2017 – via Twitter.; @realDonaldTrump (March 4, 2017). "How low has President Obama gone to tapp my phones during the very sacred election process. This is Nixon/Watergate. Bad (or sick) guy!"" (Tweet). Archived from the original on May 1, 2017 – via Twitter.) Trump stated he had "just found out" that former president Barack Obama had wiretapped his phones at Trump Tower "just before the victory". He did not say where he had obtained the information and offered no evidence to support it. Trump compared the alleged intrusion to McCarthyism and Watergate. Anonymous White House officials told The Washington Post that Trump did not appear to coordinate his comments with other White House officials.

=== Followup ===
Fact-checkers immediately requested supporting information for these claims from the White House communications team. In response to the requests from The Washington Post, Politifact and FactCheck.org, the White House provided five items:

- An article from the BBC, titled "Trump 'compromising' claims: How and why did we get here?"
- An article from Heat Street, titled "EXCLUSIVE: FBI 'Granted FISA Warrant' Covering Trump Camp's Ties To Russia"
- An article from National Review, titled "FISA and the Trump Team"
- A transcript of Bret Baier interviewing Paul Ryan on Fox the previous night, and
- An article from The New York Times, titled "Wiretapped Data Used in Inquiry of Trump Aides"

None of these articles corroborated the specific allegations made in the tweets, but rather contained terms and elements of stories which were mingled together and distorted. All of the listed fact-checkers rated Trump's claims as false.

In the first official statement issued after the tweets, made through press secretary Sean Spicer on March 5, Trump asked congressional intelligence committees to "determine whether executive branch investigative powers were abused in 2016" as part of their oversight authority of the Department of Justice and as part of the ongoing investigation into Russian interference in the election. In response, multiple congressional committees agreed to investigate. None found any evidence supporting the wiretapping claim, and they reported their findings in the weeks following the tweets.

In interviews on March 5 and 6, Deputy Press Secretary Sarah Huckabee Sanders attempted to recast the president's words with a softer tone. On This Week she said "I think there certainly could have been (a FISA warrant). And it sounds like there's something that we should look into and verify." On Monday morning's Today show, she said "the president firmly believes that the Obama administration may have tapped into the phones at Trump Tower, this is something that we should look into. We'd like to know for sure."

Later on March 6, White House counselor Kellyanne Conway told Fox News's Fox & Friends that the president had "information and intelligence that the rest of us do not", although when asked about this, Press Secretary Spicer equivocated. Spicer spoke to reporters that day from the White House briefing room with an audio-only feed for the public, and was peppered with questions about the tweets. Spicer referred to his weekend statement requesting congressional investigation and did not to add clarity or context to Trump's tweets. Referring to Conway's claim, Spicer said "I can't specifically respond to you in terms of what she was referring to, whether she was referring to the exact nature of this charge or whether generally speaking he is given information."

Trump lowered his profile in the week following the tweets, limiting reporter access in contrast to the first six weeks of his administration.

== Extension of claim ==
During an interview on March 12, 2017, Kellyanne Conway was asked by The Record's Mike Kelly, "do you know whether Trump Tower was wiretapped?" She answered "what I can say is there are many ways to surveil each other. You can surveil someone through their phones, certainly through their television sets — any number of different ways, microwaves that turn into cameras." However, Conway's comments resulted in a headline which read "Kellyanne Conway Alludes to Even Wider Surveillance of Trump Campaign" which directly led to question from CNN's New Day anchor Chris Cuomo. On that show, she attempted to walk back her microwave quip, stating that "I'm not Inspector Gadget, I don't believe that people are using the microwave to spy on the Trump campaign." She faced similar questioning on Today and Good Morning America but ended her media tour roundly mocked as "the microwave lady".

At a March 13 press briefing, Spicer claimed that Trump was referring to general surveillance rather than direct wiretapping. Spicer also said that the White House believed that the Obama administration was responsible for the surveillance, not Obama himself, said Trump's tweet which specifically named the former president.

Trump spoke on his own behalf regarding the tweets for the first time in a March 15 interview with Tucker Carlson on Fox News. He cited the March 3 interview with Paul Ryan on an episode of Special Report with Bret Baier on Fox News and the January 19 The New York Times article as the origin of his allegations.

The White House press briefing on March 16 became very contentious when Spicer was confronted by the press corps with the bipartisan doubts of congressional leaders about Trump's wiretap claims. The back-and-forth between Spicer and reporters lasted almost ten minutes and was marked by Spicer repeating news reports about possible GCHQ involvement in spying on Trump, further inflaming the media firestorm.

In an April 2 interview with the UK-based Financial Times, Trump expressed very little regret for his tweets, saying "I don't regret anything, because there is nothing you can do about it. You know if you issue hundreds of tweets, and every once in a while you have a clinker, that's not so bad. Now my last tweet, you know the one that you are talking about perhaps, was the one about being in quotes wire tapped, meaning surveilled. Guess what, it is turning out to be true." This was echoed in a much later 2019 interview with C-SPAN, when asked whether he regretted any of his tweets, Trump said "Not much, honestly not much...I sent the one about the wiretapping...and that turned out to be true." On April 25, 2019, when calling in to Sean Hannity's Fox news show, Trump said that his original allegation of "wires tapped" was not literal as he had used quotation marks, saying that he really meant: "surveillance, spying you can sort of say whatever you want". Trump also said that his allegations were made "just on a little bit of a hunch and a little bit of wisdom maybe". Trump elaborated that he thought his allegations were "pretty insignificant" when he made them.

=== Allegation of British involvement ===
If the telephone rang in GCHQ from the White House, that in itself would be unheard of. The director [GCHQ's chief] would then ring his US counterpart, the director of the NSA—there's a hotline on his desk—to ask if it was a hoax. The next person he would ring would be the [UK] foreign secretary to say we've had this amazing request. Nothing would happen without a warrant from the top of government and that would just never be granted in these circumstances.

— David Omand (former GCHQ director), Financial Times

In the summer of 2016, long before the first public statement from the Obama Administration on October 7, 2016, about Russian interference, "Robert Hannigan, then the head of the U.K.'s intelligence service the G.C.H.Q., had recently flown to Washington and briefed the C.I.A.'s director, John Brennan, on a stream of illicit communications between Trump's team and Moscow that had been intercepted. (The content of these intercepts has not become public.)" "The matter was deemed so sensitive it was handled at 'director level'."

This information became public on April 13, 2017, when The Guardian reported that GCHQ and other European and Australian intelligence agencies had intercepted secret communications and surveilled meetings between members of the Trump campaign team and "known or suspected Russian agents", and shared this intelligence with their U.S. counterparts. The communications were obtained through "incidental collection" as part of routine surveillance of Russian intelligence assets, not from a targeted operation against Trump or his campaign.

Before The Guardian's report, during a March 14, 2017, Fox & Friends interview, Andrew Napolitano said that "Three intelligence sources have informed Fox News that President Obama went outside the chain of command", using the British Government Communications Headquarters (GCHQ) to implement surveillance to avoid leaving "American fingerprints". Napolitano accused Robert Hannigan, who resigned from the GCHQ on January 23, of ordering the wiretap. Hannigan reportedly resigned for personal reasons. Fox News anchor Bret Baier later stated that "the Fox News division was never able to back up [Napolitano's] claims". Napolitano was reportedly temporarily taken off air by Fox due to the allegations. One of Napolitano's sources was former intelligence officer Larry C. Johnson, who later told CNN that Napolitano had misrepresented the statements he made on an online discussion board. Johnson, citing two anonymous sources, claimed that the GCHQ was passing information on the Trump campaign to US intelligence through a "back-channel", but stressed that the GCHQ did not "wiretap" Trump or his associates and that alleged information sharing by the GCHQ was not done at the direction of the Obama administration.

On March 16, Spicer repeated Napolitano's claim at a White House press briefing. The following day, GCHQ responded with a rare public statement: "Recent allegations made by media commentator Judge Andrew Napolitano about GCHQ being asked to conduct 'wiretapping' against the then president-elect are nonsense. They are utterly ridiculous and should be ignored." A British government source said the allegation was "totally untrue and quite frankly absurd". Admiral Michael S. Rogers, director of the National Security Agency (NSA), said he has seen nothing to suggest that there was "any such activity" nor any request to do so. Former GCHQ director David Omand told Financial Times that "The suggestion that [Barack Obama] asked GCHQ to spy on Trump is just completely barking — that would be evident to anyone who knew the system."

The claim started a diplomatic dispute with Britain. Tim Farron, the Liberal Democrat leader in Britain, said "Trump is compromising the vital UK-US security relationship to try to cover his own embarrassment. This harms our and US security." The Telegraph said that two U.S. officials had personally apologized for the allegation. The British government also said that the U.S. government promised not to repeat these claims. The White House denied reports that it had apologized to the British government, saying Spicer was merely "pointing to public reports" without endorsing them.

=== Surveillance of Trump associates ===
==== Reports ====
On January 11, 2017, The Guardian reported that the FBI initially applied for a FISA warrant in June 2016, requesting to "monitor four members of the Trump team suspected of irregular contacts with Russian officials". This initial request was denied. A source told The Guardian that the FBI then submitted a more narrowly focused request in October, "but that has not been confirmed, and it is not clear whether any warrant led to a full investigation". The Guardian article was not cited by the White House in connection with Trump's wiretapping claim.

The day after The Guardian report, BBC journalist Paul Wood separately reported that, in response to an April 2016 tip from a foreign intelligence agency to the CIA about "money from the Kremlin going into the US presidential campaign", a joint task force had been established including representatives of the FBI, the Department of the Treasury, the Department of Justice (DOJ), the Central Intelligence Agency (CIA), the Office of the Director of National Intelligence (ODNI) and the NSA; and in June 2016 lawyers from the FBI had applied to the FISA court for "permission to intercept the electronic records from two Russian banks". The BBC alleged that the investigation was prompted in April 2016 by a "tip" from an intelligence agency of one of the Baltic States. According to Wood, this application was rejected, as was a more narrowly focused request in July, and the order was finally granted by a different FISA judge on October 15, three weeks before the presidential election. According to the article, the warrant did not name Trump or his associates.

On January 18, McClatchy separately reported that "the FBI had obtained a warrant on Oct. 15 from the highly secretive Foreign Intelligence Surveillance Court allowing investigators access to bank records and other documents about potential payments and money transfers related to Russia". The McClatchy article was not cited by the White House in connection with Trump's wiretapping claim.

In April 2017, The Washington Post initially reported that the FBI secured a FISA warrant to monitor Trump campaign associate Carter Page in the summer of 2016 — later corrected to October 2016, one month after Page had left the Trump campaign. The warrant was reportedly based on the possibility that Page was acting as an agent of a foreign government, i.e., Russia.

On September 18, 2017, CNN reported that the FBI wiretapped Paul Manafort, Trump's former campaign chairman, from as early as 2014 through an unspecified time before the 2016 election, and also after the election through early 2017, pursuant to two separate FISA court orders. It has not been confirmed whether Trump's conversations with Manafort were intercepted as part of this surveillance. CNN acknowledged that prior to this disclosure, "speculation has run rampant about whether Manafort or others associated with Trump were under surveillance". The CNN report noted that it was unclear if Manafort was under FBI surveillance while he resided in Trump Tower. In December 2019, CNN added an editor's note to the article, stating: "On December 9, 2019, the Justice Department Inspector General released a report regarding the opening of the investigation on Russian election interference and Donald Trump's campaign. In the report, the IG contradicts what CNN was told in 2017, noting that the FBI team overseeing the investigation did not seek FISA surveillance of Paul Manafort."

On May 16, 2018, The New York Times reported that "The F.B.I. investigated four unidentified Trump campaign aides in those early months...[including]...Michael T. Flynn, Paul Manafort, Carter Page and Mr. Papadopoulos."

==== Analysis ====
In its March 5 analysis of the reporting that preceded Trump's allegations, The Washington Post stated that "the articles all suggest that the FISA requests—if they happened—were done by the intelligence agencies and the FBI", and not by the Obama administration. According to The Post, Mensch's article was the only one to have alleged any surveillance of Trump Tower. No major news organizations have been able to confirm Mensch's account, despite prolonged efforts by The New York Times and The Washington Post. This absence of verification, combined with Mensch's reliance on "vague" and anonymous sourcing to individuals "with links to the counter-intelligence community", lead The Times and The Post to urge skepticism about the veracity of her account.

David A. Graham of The Atlantic responded to claims that the Manafort wiretap report vindicated Trump's March 2017 tweets: "This is not true—Trump claimed he had been the subject of Obama-ordered, politically motivated surveillance, for which there remains no evidence." While acknowledging that "it does make for a more complicated picture than previously known", Graham argued "there are reasons to doubt" that Trump was even aware of the Manafort wiretap at the time he made his unsupported allegations against Obama. Graham concluded: "Insofar as there are parallels between what Pollak, Levin, and Napolitano said and the new story, it looks like luck." Aaron Blake of The Washington Post noted that, according to CNN, lawyers for both Trump and Manafort convinced the two men to discontinue their phone conversations some time after Trump took office: "If Trump's lawyers somehow knew about and fought back against the Manafort wiretap, it stands to reason that Trump himself might have been aware of it. ... While we don't know the exact timing of all of this, perhaps this is what Trump was referring to and he, as he is wont to do, exaggerated it."

The Washington Post media critic Erik Wemple criticized CNN for not retracting its Manafort wiretap report in December 2019, while also noting a subdued response from right-leaning critics of the network: "A mightier uproar likely would have resulted if CNN's story had attacked a common Trump talking point. Instead, it supported the president's claims that the federal government had spied on his campaign. Keep this case in mind the next time someone says that errors in the mainstream media go only against Trump."

There has been criticism of Trump's claim as simply being a "dead cat", a false allegation against Obama intended to direct media and public interest away from Trump and his team's alleged connections with Russia.

== Reactions ==
=== From politicians ===
Most Republicans in Congress distanced themselves from the claim and refused to comment on it, although members of both the Senate and House of Representatives vowed to investigate the matter.

Obama spokesman Kevin Lewis repudiated the claim in a statement later that day saying: "A cardinal rule of the Obama administration was that no White House official ever interfered with any independent investigation led by the Department of Justice." The Wall Street Journal described Obama as "livid" when he heard about the allegations personally, though other sources said he "rolled his eyes" and remained more concerned about Trump's conservative and nationalist agenda.

Republican Senator Rand Paul pointed out that a backdoor intercept of Trump's communications was possible. Elizabeth Goitein, a surveillance law expert at New York University, pointed out that backdoor searches of incidental records collected on Americans overseas were allowed by U.S. law. Republican Representative Frank LoBiondo, a senior member on the House Intelligence Committee, speculated on March 20, after Comey's testimony to the committee, that it was possible there was incidental collection that occurred due to targeting Russian communications, but expressed doubt that there was any evidence that there was such a wiretap. Incidental collection—also called backdoor collection by politicians such as Democratic Senator Ron Wyden —has been publicly acknowledged by the intelligence community for years. Democratic Representative Ted Lieu compared Trump to Nixon: "Either @realDonaldTrump is paranoid like Nixon, or judge found probable cause of crime for #wiretap. Either way our President is in trouble."

German Chancellor Angela Merkel reacted to Trump's claims with a wince in March 2017. The topic came up during a joint question and answer session with the media during Merkel's visit to the White House. Trump tried to crack a joke, saying "at least we have something in common, perhaps," referring to the fact that the NSA had at one point spied on Merkel's cell phone. Merkel did not comment in response but her reaction was circulated widely on social media.

A spokesman for Russian President Vladimir Putin distanced the Kremlin from Trump's claim when asked about it.

=== From the media ===
Speaking to NBC's Meet the Press, former Director of National Intelligence James Clapper said "For the part of the national security apparatus that I oversaw as DNI there was no such wiretap activity mounted against the President-elect at the time, or as a candidate, or against his campaign." When the Obama administration's former press secretary Josh Earnest was asked by ABC News's Martha Raddatz if he could deny that the Obama Justice Department had sought and obtained a FISA court-ordered wiretap of the Trump campaign, he responded, "I don't know ... The president was not giving marching orders to the FBI about how to conduct their investigations."

=== Official government investigations ===
Following the tweets, the White House issued a statement asking for congress to exercise their oversight authority to investigate the wiretapping allegations. Both the House Intelligence Committee and the Senate Intelligence Committee already had ongoing investigations into Russian interference in the 2016 election and Trump's tweets added fuel to the fire of those investigations, so they accepted the request. The House Judiciary Committee and the Senate Judiciary Committee also jumped at the opportunity to investigate, Chairman Graham saying "if there is a investigation at the FBI of Trump, Russia campaign activities, I want to know about it. I'm tired of reading about it in the paper." All four congressional committees requested relevant documentation from the Department of Justice. The House Intelligence committee set a deadline of March 13 for responsive documentation as well as an open hearing on March 20 to review.

As an initial response, the FBI briefed the Gang of Eight on March 9, giving them insight into Crossfire Hurricane, including the existence of a FISA warrant on Carter Page but requested more time to produce actual documentation for the intelligence committees to review. On March 15, Devin Nunes and Adam Schiff, both members of the Gang of Eight, told reporters that they had not found any evidence supporting the wiretapping claim. On March 16, the Senate Intelligence Committee released a joint statement echoing that sentiment, saying "based on the information available to us, we see no indications that Trump Tower was the subject of surveillance by any element to the United States government either before or after Election Day."

At the March 20 House Intelligence hearing, Comey made a statement refuting Trump's claims regarding wiretapping while also confirming the existence of a probe into coordination between the Trump campaign and Russia. Comey had asked the Justice Department to publish a statement refuting the wiretapping claims immediately following the tweets on March 4, but they did not do so before his statement.

On March 23, Nunes stated that communications to and from Trump's presidential transition team may have been intercepted as part of incidental collection. In response, officials in the Obama administration refuted any claims that it had been monitoring the Trump team. Nunes said the surveillance was unrelated to the Russia investigation and "suggested the contents may have been inappropriately disseminated in intelligence reports ... for political reasons". Later the same day, Nunes said that he did not know "for sure" whether intelligence committees had actually monitored the Trump team's communications. In September, former National Security Advisor Susan Rice stated that a December 2016 Trump Tower meeting between Trump transition officials and Mohammed bin Zayed Al Nahyan of the United Arab Emirates (UAE) raised suspicions because the UAE allegedly failed to give the Obama administration advance notice of Zayed's visit to the U.S., as is customary. Therefore, to better understand the intent of the meeting, she "requested the names of the Americans mentioned in the classified report be revealed internally" (or "unmasked"). According to CNN's Manu Raju, while Nunes implied that such unmasking may have been improper—an allegation that the Trump administration used to deflect from Trump's original wiretap claim—Rice's "explanation appears to have satisfied some influential Republicans on the committee, undercutting both Nunes and Trump". Republican Representative Mike Conaway affirmed: "She was a good witness, answered all our questions. I'm not aware of any reason to bring her back." In May 2020, attorney general Bill Barr appointed federal prosecutor John Bash to examine unmasking conducted by the Obama administration. The inquiry concluded in October with no findings of substantive wrongdoing.

Liberal watchdog group American Oversight filed a FOIA request on March 20, 2017, demanding records that supported or disproved Trump's wiretap tweets. They initially received a Glomar response, saying the Department of Justice and the FBI "could not confirm or deny the existence" of any records that are responsive to American Oversight's FOIA request, citing the potential exposure of classified information. The group sued to force a clearer answer and narrowed their request. On September 1, 2017, they received a DOJ court filing stating that "both the FBI and NSD confirm that they have no records related to wiretaps as described by the March 4, 2017 tweets."

A December 9, 2019, report by the DOJ's Inspector General stated that "we are aware of no information indicating that the Crossfire Hurricane team requested or seriously considered FISA surveillance of Manafort or Flynn."

=== In popular culture ===
Trump's wiretap claim dominated TV news coverage in March 2017 for several weeks, overshadowing every other discussion about Trump's policy agenda. Late night talk show hosts Trevor Noah, James Corden and Stephen Colbert all made fun of President Trump for his wiretap accusations. Colbert mocked Kellyanne Conway's reference to microwave cameras the following week. Celebrities Alec Baldwin, Don Cheadle, Sarah Silverman, Sophia Bush and J.K. Rowling publicly reacted to Trump's claims, while actor Mark Hamill read the tweets as Joker, the fictional supervillain, and author Stephen King jokingly turned them into a short story.

The "wiretap" tweets are included on multiple lists of Trump's most controversial tweets. In 2020, commentator Eli Lake called it the "most consequential tweet of his presidency".

According to an April 2019 Politico/Morning Consult poll, 38% of American voters believed Donald Trump's presidential campaign was spied on during the 2016 election, with 57% agreement by Republicans and 24% by Democrats.

== See also ==
- Allegations of Obama spying on Trump
- List of conspiracy theories promoted by Donald Trump
- Nunes memo
- Social media use by Donald Trump
