= Palmer National Bank of Washington, D.C. =

American bank

The Palmer National Bank
- Industry: Banking
- Founded: June 1, 1983
- Defunct: June 7, 1997
- Fate: Acquired by George Mason Bankshares Inc. in 1996; merged into The George Mason Bank in 1997
- Headquarters: Washington, D.C.
- Total assets: $101 million (1997)

The Palmer National Bank was a bank headquartered in Washington, D.C. In 1996, it was acquired by George Mason Bankshares Inc. At that time, it had 3 branches and 1 office.

The bank's connections to the leadership of the Republican Party led to it becoming a favored financial institution for conservative political action committees during the 1980s. The bank's clientele included the National Conservative Political Action Committee and the political action committees of Senator Bob Dole of Kansas and Representative Jack Kemp of New York.

As part of the Iran-Contra scandal, Oliver North used the bank to funnel money to a Swiss bank account and ultimately to the Contras.

== History ==
The bank was founded on June 1, 1983, by Harvey McLean Jr., a real estate developer from Dallas, Texas who served as the Southern finance chairman in the 1980 Presidential campaign of George H. W. Bush, and Stefan Halper, former Deputy United States Assistant Secretary of State.

It was initially funded with $2.8 million from Herman K. Beebe, a businessman from Shreveport, Louisiana.

From 1983 to 1990, Halper served as chairman of the bank. He was replaced by Webb Hayes IV.

In 1996, the bank was acquired by George Mason Bankshares Inc. for $15.6 million in stock. George Mason Bankshares was acquired by United Bank in 1998.
