= Spygate (conspiracy theory) =

Conspiracy theory by Donald Trump that the FBI improperly spied on him

Spygate is a disproven conspiracy theory peddled by 45th U.S. president Donald Trump and his political base on many occasions throughout his first presidential term. It primarily centered around the idea that a spy was planted by the Obama administration to conduct espionage on Trump's 2016 presidential campaign for political purposes. On May 17, 2018, Trump tweeted: "Wow, word seems to be coming out that the Obama FBI 'spied on the Trump campaign with an embedded informant.'" In that tweet, he quoted Andrew C. McCarthy, who had just appeared on Fox & Friends repeating assertions from his own May 12 article for National Review.

Trump made more assertions, without providing evidence, on May 18 and May 22–23, 2018, adding that it was done in an effort to help Trump's rival, Hillary Clinton, win the general election. He said the supposed spy, later identified as professor Stefan Halper, was paid a "massive amount of money" for doing so. In the middle and second half of 2016, Halper, a longtime confidential source for U.S. intelligence, began working as a secret informant for the FBI, targeting three Trump campaign advisers separately in a covert effort to investigate suspected Russian interference in the 2016 United States elections. However, as of May 2018, the Trump administration had produced no evidence that Halper had actually joined the Trump campaign or any politically motivated surveillance of the campaign.

On June 5, 2018, Trump further alleged that a counterintelligence operation into the Trump campaign had been running since December 2015. The House Intelligence Committee, then in Republican control, concluded in an April 2018 report that the FBI counterintelligence investigation of the Trump campaign did not begin until late July 2016, while the February 2018 Nunes memo written by Republican aides reached the same conclusion, as did the February 2018 rebuttal memo by committee Democrats. Whether the use of the FISA warrant, which permits investigators to collect archived communications well prior to the issuance of the warrant, includes the December 2015 date remains partially classified.

Political commentators and high-ranking politicians from both sides of the political spectrum have dismissed Trump's allegations as lacking evidence and maintained that the FBI's use of Halper as a covert informant was in no way improper. Trump's claims about when the counterintelligence investigation was initiated have been shown to be false. A December 2019 Justice Department Inspector General report "found no evidence that the FBI attempted to place any [Confidential Human Sources] within the Trump campaign, recruit members of the Trump campaign as CHSs, or task CHSs to report on the Trump campaign."

Spygate is similar to but distinct from Trump's March 2017 assertion that President Obama "had my 'wires tapped' in Trump Tower," which the Trump Justice Department stated was untrue in September 2017 and October 2018 federal court briefs. It is also part of Trump's larger list of spying allegations against the Obama administration.

== Background ==
=== Origins of FBI investigation ===
In early February 2018, the Nunes memo – written by aides of Republican Devin Nunes, chairman of the House Intelligence Committee – confirmed that a tip about George Papadopoulos "triggered the opening of" the original FBI counterintelligence investigation into links between the Trump campaign and Russia in late July 2016. Later that month, a rebuttal memo by committee Democrats stated that "the FBI initiated its counterintelligence investigation on July 31, 2016".

In April 2018, the House Intelligence Committee, then in Republican control, released a final report on Russian interference in the 2016 presidential election, which stated that the House Intelligence Committee found that "in late July 2016, the FBI opened an enterprise CI [counterintelligence] investigation into the Trump campaign following the receipt of derogatory information about foreign policy advisor George Papadopoulos". In March 2019, Nunes, the then-ranking member of the committee, asserted that it was "for certain" false that the FBI investigation began in late July 2016 as his earlier report had found, but media reports offered no further evidence or explanation from Nunes on this claim.

On May 16, 2018, The New York Times reported the existence of a 2016 FBI investigation named Crossfire Hurricane tasked with investigating whether individuals within the Trump campaign had inappropriate or illegal links to Russian efforts to interfere with the election. Four individuals – Michael T. Flynn, Paul Manafort, Carter Page and George Papadopoulos – were initially investigated because of such ties. During the investigation, the FBI obtained phone records and other documents using national security letters. The Times also reported that FBI agents, believing that Trump would lose the election, and cognizant of Trump's false claims that the election was rigged against him, tried to avoid allowing the investigation to become public as they feared that Trump would blame his defeat on the revelation of the investigation.

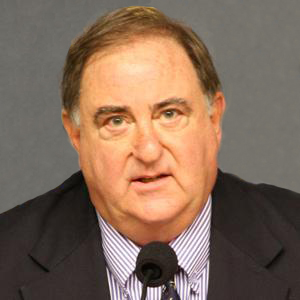
Stefan Halper spoke to Trump campaign advisers, but there is no evidence that Halper had actually joined Trump's campaign.

=== Activities of Stefan Halper ===
Stefan Halper, an FBI informant, spoke separately to three Trump campaign advisers – Carter Page, Sam Clovis and George Papadopoulos – in 2016 in an effort to investigate Russian interference in the 2016 United States elections. There is no evidence that Halper had actually joined Trump's campaign.

Page said that he "had extensive discussions" with Halper on "a bunch of different foreign-policy-related topics", ending in September 2017. A former federal law enforcement official told The New York Times that the initial encounter between Halper and Page at a London symposium on July 11–12, 2016 was a coincidence, rather than at the direction of the FBI.

Clovis's attorney said that Clovis and Halper had discussed China during their sole meeting on August 31 or September 1, 2016, and Clovis stated in May 2018 that it appeared Halper was only offering his assistance to the campaign.

The New York Times reported that on September 15, 2016, Halper asked Papadopoulos if he knew of any campaign coordination with Russian efforts to disrupt the election campaign; Papadopoulos twice denied he did, notwithstanding Joseph Mifsud telling him the previous April that Russians had Hillary Clinton emails, and Papadopoulos bragging about it to Australian diplomat Alexander Downer in May. WikiLeaks released DNC emails on July 22, and four days later the Australian government informed the FBI of Downer's conversation with Papadopoulos, triggering the opening of the FBI's counterintelligence investigation into Russian interference in the 2016 United States elections on July 31. The failure of the FBI to include Papadopoulos's exculpatory statement to Stefan Halper denying that the Trump campaign was involved in the DNC email hack in its FISA application or to notify the FISA court thereafter was cited in the Inspector General's report as one of the principal faults of the Crossfire Hurricane Operation. Papadopoulos was paid $3,000 by Halper for a research paper on the oil fields of Turkey, Israel and Cyprus.

In April 2019, The New York Times reported that the FBI had asked Halper to approach Page and Papadopoulos, although it was not clear if he had been asked to contact Clovis. In May 2019, the Times reported that Page had urged Halper to meet with Clovis and that the FBI was aware of the meeting but had not instructed Halper to ask Clovis about Russia matters. The Times also reported that the FBI also sent an investigator under the pseudonym Azra Turk to meet with Papadopoulos, while posing as Halper's assistant. The Times stated that the FBI considered it essential to add a trained and trusted investigator like Ms. Turk as a "layer of oversight", in the event the investigation was ultimately prosecuted and the government needed the credible testimony of such an individual, without exposing Halper as a longtime confidential informant.

The 2019 Inspector General report on the Crossfire Hurricane investigation contained additional details about Halper's contacts with these three campaign members. The report describes him as "an FBI CHS" and notes that "the Crossfire Hurricane team conducted three CHS [confidential human source] operations prior to the team's initial receipt of Steele's reporting on September 9, 2016. All three CHS operations were with individuals who were still with the Trump campaign."

The first meeting, in August 2016, was a consensually recorded meeting with Carter Page.

The second meeting, in September 2016, was with "a high-level official in the Trump campaign who was not a subject of the investigation", likely Clovis. It too was a "consensually recorded meeting" and was "about Papadopoulos and Carter Page". "Little information" was received by Halper.

The third meeting, in September 2016, was with Papadopoulos.

=== Exposure of Stefan Halper ===
In late April 2018, Devin Nunes sent a classified subpoena to the Justice Department. In response, the Justice Department rejected the request for information "regarding a specific individual". On May 8, 2018, The Washington Post described this individual as "a top-secret intelligence source" and "a U.S. citizen who has provided intelligence to the CIA and FBI."

On May 17, 2018, The Daily Caller reported that Stefan Halper, a professor at Cambridge known for his work for the CIA, had met Trump campaign advisors Carter Page and George Papadopoulos. On May 18, The New York Times and The Washington Post separately published articles about an FBI informant gathering information from Trump campaign officials. Neither newspaper would then name the FBI informant, but the Times described him as an "American academic who teaches in Britain" who contacted Page and Papadopoulos, while the Post reported that he is "a retired American professor" who met Page "at a British university". New York described that putting the information in the Caller, Post and Times reports together "all but confirm" Halper as the FBI informant.

== Trump and his allies' allegations ==
=== May 2018 ===
On May 12, 2018 Andrew C. McCarthy wrote in the National Review that:

"[Glenn Simpson] testified that Christopher Steele told him the FBI had a "human source" – i.e., a spy— inside the Trump campaign. ... Simpson gave his testimony about the FBI's human source at a closed Senate Judiciary Committee hearing on August 22, 2017."

"Simpson explained to the Senate committee (italics [McCarthy's]): Essentially what [Christopher Steele] told me was they [the FBI] had other intelligence about this matter from an internal Trump campaign source and ... one of those pieces of intelligence was a human source from inside the Trump organization."

On May 17, 2018, on Fox & Friends that prompted Trump's reply, where Andrew C. McCarthy said in reply to a question:

Kilmeade: "Are we wrong to point out this line buried in the middle of the [New York Times] story, at least one government informant met several times with Paige and Papadopoulos. Did they [the FBI] actually put someone undercover to try to bring these guys out?"

McCarthy: "Yeah, they did, Brian. I've written a couple of columns in the last week or so pointing out that there is probably no doubt that they had at least one confidential informant in the campaign..."

On May 17, 2018, Trump tweeted:

Wow, word seems to be coming out that the Obama FBI "spied on the Trump campaign with an embedded informant." Andrew McCarthy says, "There's probably no doubt that they had at least one confidential informant in the campaign." If so, this is bigger than Watergate!

On May 18, Trump made the following statement on Twitter:

Reports are there was indeed at least one FBI representative implanted, for political purposes, into my campaign for president. It took place very early on, and long before the phony Russia Hoax became a "hot" Fake News story. If true – all time biggest political scandal!

On May 22, Trump made the following accusation on Twitter:

If the person placed very early into my campaign wasn't a spy put there by the previous Administration for political purposes, how come such a seemingly massive amount of money was paid for services rendered – many times higher than normal ... Follow the money! The spy was there early in the campaign and yet never reported Collusion with Russia, because there was no Collusion. He was only there to spy for political reasons and to help Crooked Hillary win – just like they did to Bernie Sanders, who got duped!

A day later, he followed up with a related tweet:

SPYGATE could be one of the biggest political scandals in history!

Soon after this series of tweets, it was widely reported in the media that Trump's allegations of politically motivated spying were unsubstantiated. Trump has not offered any evidence for Spygate when asked for it, instead saying: "All you have to do is look at the basics and you'll see it." It was also widely reported that Trump's allegations were intended to discredit the Mueller Investigation. The Associated Press added that Trump had said he wanted "to brand" the informant as a "spy," as using a more nefarious term than "informant" would supposedly resonate more with the public.

In the May 22 tweets, Trump wrote that Halper, a longtime FBI informant, was paid a "massive amount of money" and concluded that he thus must be a spy implanted for "political purposes". Although the Defense department's Office of Net Assessment had paid Halper more than $1 million in contracts between 2012 and 2016 for "research and development in the social sciences and humanities," Halper subcontracted some of this work to other researchers, with about 40% of the money awarded before Trump announced his candidacy in 2015, and it is unknown whether the FBI paid Halper at all. Halper worked for the Nixon, Ford and Reagan administrations and continued as a State and Defense department advisor until 2001. He had been considered for an ambassadorship in the Trump administration.

In the May 23 tweets, Trump misquoted former Director of National Intelligence James Clapper, attributing to him the statement that "Trump should be happy that the FBI was SPYING on his campaign." Instead, when asked "Was the FBI spying on Trump's campaign?", Clapper said, "No, they were not." Clapper added that, although he does not "particularly like" the term "spying," he thinks that Trump should have been happy that the FBI was "spying on ... what the Russians were doing," and that the FBI were trying to determine whether the Russians were infiltrating his campaign, or trying to influence the election. Clapper later said that while some of the surveillance fit the dictionary definition of "spying," he objected strongly to the use of the term because of its misleading connotations.

On May 26, Trump questioned "why didn't the crooked highest levels of the FBI or 'Justice' contact me to tell me of the phony Russia problem?" NBC News reported in December 2017 that on July 19, 2016, after Trump won the Republican nomination, the Federal Bureau of Investigation (FBI) warned him that foreign adversaries, including Russia, would probably attempt to spy on and infiltrate his campaign. Trump was told to alert the FBI of any suspicious activity.

On May 27, when Trump's attorney Rudy Giuliani was asked whether the promotion of the Spygate theory was meant to discredit the special counsel investigation, he replied that the investigators "are giving us the material to do it. Of course, we have to do it in defending the president ... it is for public opinion" on whether to "impeach or not impeach" Trump.

=== June 2018 ===
On June 5, Trump made new accusations on Twitter:

Wow, Strzok-Page, the incompetent & corrupt FBI lovers, have texts referring to a counter-intelligence operation into the Trump Campaign dating way back to December, 2015. SPYGATE is in full force! Is the Mainstream Media interested yet? Big stuff!

However, the December 2015 texts do not make any reference to the Trump campaign or Russia.

This particular conspiracy theory promoted by Trump was traced by media outlets to originate from a Twitter user called @Nick_Falco, who on June 4 posted about the words "oconus lures" in December 2015 texts between FBI employees Peter Strzok and Lisa Page. While "oconus" refers to "outside the continental United States", Falco inferred that "lures" refer to spies. However, according to the United States Department of Justice, "lures" refer to "subterfuge to entice a criminal defendant to leave a foreign country so that he or she can be arrested". Falco suggested that the FBI may have "wanted to run a baited Sting Op using foreign agents against Trump," despite none of the texts mentioning the Trump campaign or Russia. Also on June 4, Falco's tweet spread to the r/conspiracy forum on Reddit, and also The Gateway Pundit, a far-right, pro-Trump website which has published multiple false conspiracy theories. The Gateway Pundit wrote an article entitled: "Breaking: Senate releases unredacted texts showing FBI initiated MULTIPLE SPIES in Trump campaign in December 2015". However, the texts referenced by Falco were publicly released by a Senate committee months earlier in February 2018. On June 5, Lou Dobbs of Fox Business said that "the FBI may have initiated a number of spies into the Trump campaign as early as December of 2015". Dobbs's interviewee on the show, Chris Farrell of the conservative group Judicial Watch, agreed that the existence of an "intelligence operation directed against then-candidate Trump" was "indisputable". Trump's June 5 tweet on Spygate came less than an hour after he watched Dobbs's interview, with Trump tweeting praise of Dobbs for the "great interview".

After Trump made his June 5 tweet, Fox News described the news as "New Strzok-Page texts released", with Fox News television host Laura Ingraham saying: "It certainly appears they were looking to put more lures into the campaign in 2015." Republican Representative Ron DeSantis, a panelist on Ingraham's show, agreed that it was "clear" that the FBI investigation into Trump started earlier than July 2016.

After receiving information about George Papadopoulos's activities, the FBI began surveilling the Trump campaign to see if it was coordinating with the Russian's interference efforts. The revelation prompted the Crossfire Hurricane investigation into the Trump campaign, which started on July 31, 2016.

== Reactions and criticism ==
=== May 2018 ===
Shortly after Trump's allegation, several members of Congress received a classified briefing on the matter from the Justice Department. Trey Gowdy, the Republican chairman of the House Oversight Committee and a former federal prosecutor, stated after the briefing:

I am even more convinced that the FBI did exactly what my fellow citizens would want them to do when they got the information they got, and that it has nothing to do with Donald Trump...President Trump himself in the Comey memos said if anyone connected with my campaign was working with Russia, I want you to investigate it, and it sounds to me like that is exactly what the FBI did. I think when the President finds out what happened, he is going to be not just fine, he is going to be glad that we have an FBI that took seriously what they heard.... The FBI is doing what he told them to do.

Gowdy retracted this remark three weeks later indicating that his statement relied on briefings and "the word of the FBI and the DOJ" and that he should have insisted on seeing the actual documents. After a four-hour session reviewing documents at the Department of Justice, Gowdy said that was the first time he saw that Peter Strzok had actually initiated and approved Crossfire Hurricane, the exculpatory information on George Papadopoulos, and also the first time he saw, despite the testimonial denials of the FBI that "Trump's not the target, the campaign's not the target" of the Crossfire Hurricane, the Trump campaign mentioned in the predicate document.

Senior Republicans including House Speaker Paul Ryan and Richard Burr, chairman of the Senate Intelligence Committee, supported Gowdy's initial assessment of the situation.

Republican Representative Tom Rooney, who is on the House Intelligence Committee, chided Trump for creating "this thing to tweet about knowing that it's not true.... Maybe it's just to create more chaos." Republican senator Jeff Flake has said that the "so-called Spygate" is a "diversion tactic, obviously". while Republican Senator Marco Rubio said that "it appears that there was an investigation not of the campaign but of certain individuals who have a history that we should be suspicious of that predate the presidential campaign of 2015, 2016".

Representative Adam Schiff, the top Democrat on the House Intelligence Committee, has said that Spygate is "lie-gate", a "piece of propaganda the president wants to put out and repeat". He accused President Trump of repeatedly spreading baseless lies by quoting that "people are saying ..." or "we've been told ...". Michael Hayden, a retired general, former Director of the National Security Agency and former Director of the Central Intelligence Agency, said that Trump, through Spygate, was "simply trying to delegitimize the Mueller investigation, the FBI, the Department of Justice, and he's willing to throw almost anything against the wall".

Haaretz, Chris Megerian and Eli Stokols of Los Angeles Times, and Kyle Cheney of Politico have labelled Spygate as a conspiracy theory by President Trump.

Journalist Shepard Smith has said that "Fox News knows of no evidence to support the president's claim. Lawmakers from both parties say using an informant to investigate is not spying. It's part of the normal investigative process." Former judge and Fox News legal analyst Andrew Napolitano also stated that the use of an informant was part of standard procedure.

Zack Beauchamp of Vox said that "Trump's misconception" appeared to come from Andrew C. McCarthy, who had just appeared on Fox & Friends repeating assertions from his own May 12 article for National Review.

Washington Post columnist Max Boot described Spygate as the latest example in a "nonstop" series of Trump's "nonsensical" allegations of a "Deep State" conspiracy against him. According to Boot, this included Trump's March 2017 Trump Tower wiretapping allegations refuted by Trump's own Justice Department, and Trump's January 2018 allegations that texts between FBI employees Peter Strzok and Lisa Page were tantamount to "treason" – allegations that Trump made despite the fact that there was no evidence of an anti-Trump conspiracy.

Jon Meacham, a presidential historian, has said, in regard to Spygate: "The effect on the life of the nation of a president inventing conspiracy theories in order to distract attention from legitimate investigations or other things he dislikes is corrosive."

Aaron Blake, writing for The Washington Post, wrote that the "central problem" of the Spygate conspiracy theory is the "fact that these people who supposedly would do anything to stop Trump ... didn't". In the period before the election, the FBI "didn't use the information it had collected to actually prevent Trump from becoming president", as it did not publicly reveal it was already investigating links between George Papadopoulos, Carter Page, Paul Manafort and Russia. Rather, the reports before the election were that the FBI saw no clear link between Russia and the Trump campaign, instead believing that Russia was trying to disrupt the election without purposely trying to elect Trump.

Steven Poole, writing for The Guardian, wrote that the real scandal was Trump using the "-gate" suffix for the issue, as the Spygate allegations are about "purely imaginary things".

CNN's Josh Campbell and Slate's Dahlia Lithwick felt that Trump was carrying out the act of rebranding, with Trump describing an "informant" as a "spy", and describing legal counter-intelligence gathering as illegitimate "deep state spying" and "Spygate".

=== June 2018 ===
The New York magazine addressed the June 2018 allegations by stating: "It's not surprising or scandalous that FBI agents would be using espionage tradecraft. Gateway Pundit seems to have invented the crucial factual element of the conspiracy out of thin air" while "Trump is citing right-wing conspiracy theorists who operate at a full level further removed from reality than the right-wing conspiracy theorists he customarily cites."

Zack Beauchamp of Vox said that "the FBI's investigation into Trump didn't open until July 2016" and that Trump's June 2018 allegation that a counterintelligence operation into his campaign was active in 2015 was based on an interpretation of the Strzok-Page texts that was "entirely unfounded in the actual evidence." Beauchamp claimed that this was an instance of a pattern in which "Fox picks up on some random internet rumor, the president picks it up from Fox, and then Fox and other right-wing outlets leap to defend what the president tweeted, which only reinforces Trump's sense that he's right." After reporting on both Trump's May 2018 and June 2018 tweets, Beauchamp wrote that the "best way to analyze 'Spygate' is ... a conspiracy theory... a ginned-up controversy Trump has capitalized on to justify his argument that the FBI is hopelessly biased against him".

=== August 2018 ===
On August 31, 2018, Trisha B. Anderson, who was the Deputy General Counsel of the FBI's Office of General Counsel in the counterintelligence operation of the Trump campaign, testified that "To my knowledge, the FBI did not place anybody within a campaign but, rather, relied upon its network of sources, some of whom already had campaign contacts."

== 2019 Inspector General report ==
A December 2019 Justice Department Inspector General report "found no evidence that the FBI attempted to place any CHSs [confidential human sources] within the Trump campaign, recruit members of the Trump campaign as CHSs, or task CHSs to report on the Trump campaign." Several issues examined by the report were: the origins of the Crossfire Hurricane investigation, the FBI's usage of reports from Christopher Steele, the FBI's applications to the Foreign Intelligence Surveillance Court to surveil former Trump campaign adviser Carter Page, and the FBI's use of confidential human sources as part of the investigation, among other issues.

Attorney General Bill Barr, who had testified to Congress in April 2019, "I think spying did occur", issued a statement upon release of the inspector general's report in which he characterized the FBI's Crossfire Hurricane investigation as "intrusive," but within the context of the FBI wiretap on former Trump aide Carter Page, rather than on the question of whether any individual had been directed to spy on the campaign. The inspector general determined that the FBI made 17 errors or omissions – some of them severe – in its FISA warrant applications for Page, and attributed the warrant problems to "gross incompetence and negligence" rather than intentional malfeasance or political bias. Benjamin Wittes concluded that the inspector general's report exposed a "worst-case-scenario. No, it's not political spying on the Trump campaign or anything like that.... Rather, the problem is a far more general one: It appears that the facts presented in a lot of FISA applications are not reliably accurate."

Barr and his designated investigator John Durham also had for months been investigating a conspiracy theory "Mr. Trump's allies have asserted, without evidence", that Joseph Mifsud "was actually a C.I.A. agent working as part of an Obama administration plot" to contact and entrap Trump campaign advisor George Papadopoulos in order to establish a false predicate to justify opening Crossfire Hurricane. Bill Priestap told Congress "there was no F.B.I. conspiracy against Mr. Trump or his campaign" and denied "the F.B.I. was secretly working with" professor Mifsud.

== Other uses ==
Reports from ABC News, Fox News and NBC News in May 2018 state that Trump used the term 'Spygate' for the claim that the FBI spied on his campaign using a confidential informant.

Glenn Kessler of The Washington Post wrote in May 2018 that the term 'Spygate' "refers to the news that the FBI obtained information from an informant – Stefan Halper, an emeritus professor at the University of Cambridge – who met with at least three members of Trump's campaign staff suspected of having links to Russia." Kessler suggested that Trump's use of 'Spygate' was the latest in a series of Trump's attempts to discredit and obfuscate the Mueller investigation, and that, like the other attempts, this one may not "gain long-term traction".

Christina Zhao of Newsweek wrote in April 2019 that Spygate was a term that Trump "apparently coined to refer to allegations that the FBI had spied on his" 2016 presidential campaign. Zhao also noted that Attorney General William Barr had also discussed the claims while testifying to the Senate Appropriations subcommittee.

Zachary Basu of Axios wrote in April 2019 that the uncorroborated and "so-called 'spygate' scandal ... relates to alleged FISA abuses by the intelligence community", and "has been frequently promoted by defenders of President Trump".
