= Unmasking by U.S. intelligence agencies =

Unmasking by U.S. intelligence agencies typically occurs after the United States conducts eavesdropping or other intelligence gathering aimed at foreigners or foreign agents, and the name of a U.S. citizen or entity is incidentally collected. Intelligence reports are then disseminated within the U.S. government, with such names masked to protect those U.S. citizens from invasion of privacy.

The names can subsequently be unmasked upon request by authorized U.S. government officials under certain circumstances. Unmaskings occur thousands of times each year, totaling 10,012 in 2019.

== Jargon ==
When an intelligence agency spies on foreign citizens or agents, and information about innocent domestic citizens is uncovered even though they are not targets of investigation, that is called "incidental collection". If the intelligence agency is operating in a manner designed to protect privacy rights, then it normally addresses incidental collection by using a process called "minimization" which includes replacing names of innocent domestic citizens with designations like "U.S. Person One," "U.S. Person Two," et cetera, before the intelligence reports will be distributed within the government.

There are essentially two types of incidental collection. The first type is when legitimate foreign intelligence targets are speaking about a domestic person. The second type is when a legitimate foreign intelligence target is speaking with a domestic person. If the domestic person information is deemed not to have intelligence value then it is purged from government databases, but otherwise can be disseminated with minimization; in the first type of incidental collection the domestic names will be redacted, and in the second type of incidental collection everything the domestic person says will be redacted. As former CIA official Michael Morrell has put it, "In the second type of incidental collection, where the U.S. person is actually part of the conversation, typically nothing that U.S. person says can be disseminated."

== United States law ==
In the United States, the various intelligence agencies such as the CIA, FBI and National Counterterrorism Center have their own distinctive minimization procedures and unmasking procedures, which were partially declassified in August 2016. At the National Security Agency (NSA), about 20 people have authority to approve unmasking requests, according to NSA Director Michael S. Rogers. Former FBI Director James Comey said that his agency necessarily has many more than 20 people with unmasking authority, which he attributed to the fact that the scope of the FBI's mission includes domestic affairs.

The U.S. Government's minimization procedures stem primarily from the Foreign Intelligence Surveillance Act. Courts interpreting that statute have explained the purposes of minimization:

[M]inimization at the acquisition stage is designed to insure that the communications of nontarget U.S. persons who happen to be using a FISA target's telephone, or who happen to converse with the target about non-foreign intelligence information, are not improperly disseminated. Similarly, minimization at the retention stage is intended to ensure that information acquired, which is not necessary for obtaining, producing, or disseminating foreign intelligence information, be destroyed where feasible. Finally, the dissemination of foreign intelligence information needed for an approved purpose . . . should be restricted to those officials with a need for such information.

These minimization requirements complement and supplement traditional standards under the Fourth Amendment to the United States Constitution. If the surveillance is pursuant to a court order or warrant, the United States Foreign Intelligence Surveillance Court (FISA Court or FISC) must find that the proposed surveillance meets the statutory minimization requirements for information pertaining to U.S. persons, but intelligence agencies have broad discretion to spy without a court order or warrant, and so they must ensure compliance with those statutory minimization requirements under Section 702 of FISA.

When unmasking occurs, it must be based upon a valid reason, and only for the person who requests the unmasking; intelligence reports do not get re-disseminated with the name or statements of the U.S. person unmasked. NSA rules say that unmasking must be "necessary to understand foreign intelligence information or assess its importance", or be done with the consent of the U.S. person who would be unmasked, or be pursuant to a finding that the U.S. person is a foreign agent or terrorist, or the unmasked information includes evidence about a crime.

== Instances ==
Unmasking is common. According to the Office of the Director of National Intelligence (ODNI), 9,217 unmasking requests were fulfilled in 2016, 9,529 in 2017, 16,721 in 2018 and 10,012 in 2019.

=== Unmasking members of Congress ===
Members of Congress have in the past expressed concern that U.S. intelligence agencies have disseminated communications of nontarget U.S. persons (with or without naming them), including when those U.S. persons were members of Congress themselves. For example, in 2015 during the Obama administration, Representative Pete Hoekstra tweeted: "WSJ report that NSA spied on Congress and Israel communications very disturbing. Actually outrageous. Maybe unprecedented abuse of power." Likewise, in 2009, reports emerged that Representative Jane Harman had been involved in a similar incident, also involving Israel, during the George W. Bush administration.

Current practice is reportedly for the eight bipartisan leaders in Congress to receive alerts that members of Congress or their aides have been unmasked. Such an alert is known as a "Gates Notification" after former Defense Secretary and CIA Director Robert Gates, and they happen as often as once a month.

=== Unmasking aides to Donald Trump ===
In February 2017, during the Trump administration, Michael Flynn resigned his position as National Security Advisor, reportedly after communications he had with Russian Ambassador Sergey Kislyak were unmasked and leaked to the press. Flynn lost his job because the leaks led White House officials to believe that he had misled them about his discussion with Kislyak in December 2016. According to The New York Times, "The F.B.I. investigated four unidentified Trump campaign aides in those early months...[including]...Michael T. Flynn, Paul Manafort, Carter Page and Mr. Papadopoulos."

Former National Security Advisor Susan Rice made requests to unmask members of the Trump campaign and transition, which she has said were apolitical requests, and only to provide context for intelligence reports. Rice was not the person who unmasked Flynn's conversation with Kislyak, according to sources who spoke to the Wall Street Journal. Rice has said that she did unmask Trump aides at a December 2016 meeting at Trump Tower, unrelated to Kislyak or Russia. Fox News has reported that former ambassador to the United Nations Samantha Power requested 260 unmaskings during 2016, mostly toward the end of the Obama administration, which Power has denied, saying that other people requested some of the unmaskings in her name. Rice's September 2017 testimony before the House Intelligence Committee appeared to allay the concerns of Republicans, with Committee member Mike Conaway stating, "She was a good witness, answered all our questions. I'm not aware of any reason to bring her back."

The then top Democrat on the committee, Adam Schiff, says the investigation into unmasking is meant to divert attention from probes of Russian interference in the 2016 United States elections.

The list of Obama officials who sought to unmask Flynn was declassified by acting director of National Intelligence Richard Grenell. The list includes then Vice President Joe Biden, then-FBI Director James Comey, then-CIA Director John Brennan, then-Director of National Intelligence James Clapper, and Obama's then-chief of staff Denis McDonough; in addition, Samantha Power, at the time U.S. ambassador to the United Nations, appears on the unmasking records as having requested Flynn to be unmasked seven times. It is unclear whether she received Flynn's identity.

In May 2020, attorney general Bill Barr appointed U.S. attorney John Bash to examine unmaskings conducted by the Obama administration. The inquiry concluded in October 2020 with no findings of substantive wrongdoing.President Trump has claimed that the unmasking request was an act of espionage since the beginning of his presidency and has been emphatically hyping the probe as a potential October Surprise for the 2020 election. It was also revealed that unmasking requests have significantly increased under the Trump presidency according to statistical transparency reports by the Office of the Director of National Intelligence. Bash's 52-page report, previously classified top secret, was released in May 2022. Bash wrote he had found no evidence that any unmasking requests were made for any political or otherwise improper reasons during the 2016 election period or the ensuing presidential transition. He reported that "the FBI shared transcripts of the relevant communications outside the Bureau without masking General Flynn's name", but did not investigate further, because it would have been outside the scope of his inquiry. Bash said any potential misuse of nonpublic information "could be difficult to detect", and recommended "safeguards for unmasking requests that relate to presidential campaigns or transitions, including a more demanding substantive standard for granting those requests, special notification requirements, and a centralized approval process".

=== Declassifying Danchenko interview ===
In July 2020, the primary sub-source for the deeply flawed Steele dossier, Russian-trained Ukrainian attorney Igor Danchenko, was unmasked after declassification of the interview report by Attorney General William P. Barr, who, according to The New York Times, "has repeatedly been accused of abusing his powers to help Mr. Trump politically". Lindsey Graham had also "asked the F.B.I. to declassify the interview report", according to The Times. Immediately after Barr requested the FBI to declassify Danchenko's interview report, where Danchenko's name and other identifying information were blacked out, Graham posted it to the Senate Judiciary Committee's web site. Online sleuths were able to identify Danchenko based on clues left in the redacted report. The declassification order was criticized by former law enforcement officials as an unmasking that could endanger other sources and make the FBI's work harder. About two weeks after he was unmasked, Danchenko received a subpoena from Alfa-Bank, and his lawyer said that his client "fears for his life", since Russian agents are known to kill such informers. According to The New York Times, "Danchenko's identity is noteworthy because it further calls into question the credibility of the dossier", as Steele tried to dig up dirt on Trump and Russia using Danchenko, who lacked experience in working with Russian intelligence.

=== Unmasking Jensen Huang ===
In November 2026, CNN reported that the U.S. Intelligence Community had intercepted communications that an executive of Megaspeed, which was under investigation for possibly diverting sensitive technology to China was having an affair with a U.S. person. U.S. officials subsequently asked for the name to be unmasked after seeing the raw intelligence, which revealed the U.S. individual to be Nvidia CEO Jensen Huang. U.S. Secretary of State and National Security Advisor Marco Rubio subsequently drafted a memo which was relayed to very few senior officials in the White House. It also reported Rubio had briefed Trump on the issue on several occasions, including verbally in May 2026 aboard Air Force One, when they were travelling to Alaska as a stopover visit before Trump's state visit to China.

== See also ==
- De-anonymization
- Trump Tower wiretapping allegations
