= Stefan Halper =

American foreign policy scholar (born 1944)

Stefan A. Halper
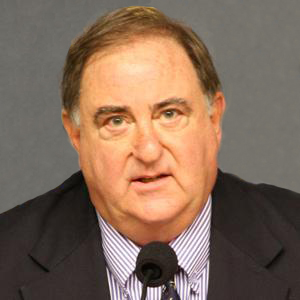
- Halper in 2010
- Born: June 4, 1944 (age 82)
- Education: Stanford University (BA); University of Oxford (PhD); University of Cambridge (PhD)
- Occupation: Professor

Stefan A. Halper (born June 4, 1944) is an American foreign policy scholar and retired senior fellow at the University of Cambridge where he is a life fellow at Magdalene College. He served as a White House official in the Nixon, Ford, and Reagan administrations, and was reportedly in charge of the spying operation by the 1980 Ronald Reagan presidential campaign that became known as "Debategate". Through his decades of work for the CIA, Halper has had extensive ties to the Bush family. Through his work with Sir Richard Billing Dearlove, he had ties to the British Secret Intelligence Service, MI6.

Halper acted as an FBI informant during the bureau's investigation into Russian interference in the 2016 United States elections. A subsequent Inspector General report later named Halper as a "confidential human source", reporting on the conversations of officials within the Trump campaign.

== Education ==
Halper graduated from Stanford University in 1967. He received a DPhil from the University of Oxford in 2001. He was appointed director of American Studies at the University of Cambridge's longstanding Department of Politics and International Studies in 2001. He received a second Ph.D. from the University of Cambridge in 2004.

== Career ==
=== United States government (1971–1984) ===
Halper began his United States government career in 1971 as a Special Assistant to the Director, Special Action Office for Drug Abuse Prevention, part of the executive office of the president, serving until 1973. He then served in the Office of Management and Budget until 1976, when he moved to the Ford Administration's Office of the Press Secretary as Staff Assistant for Communications. In 1977, Halper became special counsel to the Congressional Joint Economic Committee and legislative assistant to Senator William Roth (R-Del.). In 1979, he became national policy director for George H. W. Bush's presidential campaign and then in 1980 he became director of policy coordination for the Reagan-Bush Presidential campaign.

Halper played a central role in a scandal in the 1980 election. It was not until several years after Reagan's victory over Carter that this scandal emerged. In connection with his position Halper's name came up in the 1983/4 investigations into the Debategate affair, which was a spying scandal in which Central Intelligence Agency (CIA) officials passed classified information about Carter administration's foreign policy to Reagan campaign officials in order to ensure the Reagan campaign knew of any foreign policy decisions that Carter was considering (Iran hostage crisis). Reagan Administration officials cited by The New York Times described Halper as "the person in charge" of the operation. Halper called the report "just absolutely untrue".

In 1983, United Press International (UPI) suggested that Halper's handler for this operation was Reagan's vice presidential candidate, ex-CIA director George H. W. Bush, who worked with Halper's father-in-law, ex-CIA-Deputy-Director Ray S. Cline. After Reagan entered the White House, Halper became Deputy Assistant Secretary of State for Political-Military Affairs. Upon leaving the department in 1984, he remained a senior advisor to the Department of Defense and a senior advisor to the Department of Justice until 2001.

=== Business (1984–1990) ===
From 1984 to 1990 Halper was chairman and majority shareholder of the Palmer National Bank of Washington, D.C., the National Bank of Northern Virginia and the George Washington National Bank. Palmer National Bank was used to transfer money to Swiss Bank Accounts controlled by White House aid Oliver North.

According to Peter Dale Scott's book The Iran-Contra Connection: Secret Teams and Covert Operations in Reagan Era on the Iran–Contra affair, Ray Cline's son-in-law Roger Fontaine "made at least two visits to Guatemala in 1980 ... (with General Sumner) drafting the May 1980 Santa Fe Statement, which said that World War III was already underway in Central America against the Soviets and that Nicaragua was the enemy. And some Reagan aides felt that Halper "was receiving information from the CIA."

The Palmer National Bank, where Halper worked, was described as "the D.C. hub by which Lt. Col. Oliver North sent arms and money to the anti-Sandinista guerrilla Contras in Nicaragua. One of Palmer's founders, Stefan Halper, had no previous banking experience, but was George H.W. Bush's foreign policy director during Bush's unsuccessful 1980 presidential campaign.”

=== Academics and media (1986–2000) ===
From 1986 to 2000, Halper wrote a national security and foreign policy-focused weekly newspaper column, syndicated to 30 newspapers. Halper has worked as a senior foreign policy advisor to various think-tanks and research institutions, including the Center for Strategic and International Studies, and The Center for the National Interest, where he is a Distinguished Fellow. He has served on the Advisory Board of Directors of the Paul H. Nitze School of Advanced International Studies and contributed to various magazines, journals, newspapers and media outlets. These include: The Washington Post, Los Angeles Times, The Wall Street Journal, the BBC, CNN, SKY NEWS, ABC, CBS, NBC, C-Span, and a range of radio outlets. As a professor, Halper is a member of the Cosmos Club in Washington D.C., and the Travellers Club in London.

=== Historical research ===
Halper produced academic research on the political development of neoconservatism.

=== United States government research (2012–2016) ===
From 2012 to 2016 Halper received $1 million in contracts for “social sciences and humanities” research from the Defense department's Office of Net Assessment, some of which Halper subcontracted to other researchers. Forty percent of the money had been awarded before Trump announced his candidacy in 2015. However, declassified FBI documents reveal that $70,000 was paid to Halper by the FBI from August 2016 through February 2017 and a total of $1,181,064.44 from 1991 into early 2017.

=== Secretive opposition research for the 1980 Reagan campaign ===
The New York Times reported that for Ronald Reagan's 1980 campaign, Halper was the "person in charge" of running a "highly secretive" operation to get "inside information" about the Carter Administration's foreign policy and pass it to the Reagan campaign. Halper was running the operation out of Reagan's campaign headquarters according to Reagan Administrative officials. Those sources also said that several other retired Central Intelligence Agency officials were involved in the operation. Halper had been the deputy director of the State Department's Bureau of Political-Military Affairs shortly before taking on the operation research assignment. Halper was officially a campaign aide responsible for providing 24 hour news updates and policy ideas. Halper, worked under Robert Garrick, the director of campaign operations, who in a telephone interview said that Halper was "supposed to help with communications, but I kind of thought he had another agenda going -he was always on the phone with the door closed, and he never called me in and discussed it with me." David Prosperi, another Reagan campaign aide, said, "He provided us with wire stories and Carter speeches, but people talked about his having a network that was keeping track of things inside the Government, mostly in relation to the October Surprise." Ray S. Cline, Halper's then father-in-law and a former senior Central Intelligence official, dismissed the Reagan aides' disclosures as a "romantic fallacy."

=== FBI Operation Crossfire Hurricane ===
Halper acted as an FBI informant for Crossfire Hurricane, the FBI's investigation into Russian interference in the 2016 United States elections, and was a subject of the Spygate conspiracy theory initiated by President Donald Trump in May 2018. His FBI handler, initially identified only as "Case Agent 1", was later identified as Stephen M. Somma, a counterintelligence investigator. Trump's theory falsely alleges that the Obama administration implanted a paid spy in the 2016 Trump campaign "for political purposes" to gather information in support of Hillary Clinton's candidacy. Beginning in summer 2016, Halper spoke separately to three Trump campaign advisers – Carter Page, Sam Clovis and George Papadopoulos – but there is no evidence that Halper had actually joined Trump's campaign. Halper first met Carter Page at a symposium at the University of Cambridge organized by Steven Schrage.

Page said that he "had extensive discussions" with Halper on "a bunch of different foreign-policy-related topics", ending in September 2017. A former federal law enforcement official told The New York Times that their initial encounter at a London symposium on July 11–12, 2016 was a coincidence, rather than at the direction of the FBI. Clovis's attorney said that Clovis and Halper had discussed China during their sole meeting on August 31 or September 1, 2016. On September 2, 2016, Halper contacted Papadopoulos, inviting him to London and to write a paper on Mediterranean oil fields, which he did. On September 15, 2016, Halper asked Papadopoulos if he knew of any Russian efforts to disrupt the election campaign; Papadopoulos twice denied he did, despite Joseph Mifsud telling him the previous April that Russians had embarrassing Hillary Clinton emails, and Papadopoulos bragging about it to Alexander Downer in May. The New York Times reported in April 2019 that the FBI had asked Halper to approach Page and Papadopoulos, although it was not clear if he had been asked to contact Clovis. In May 2019, the Times reported that Page had urged Halper to meet with Clovis and that the FBI was aware of the meeting but had not instructed Halper to ask Clovis about Russia matters. The Times also reported that the FBI also sent an investigator using the name Azra Turk to meet with Papadopoulos, while posing as Halper's assistant. The Times stated that the FBI considered it essential to add a trained and trusted investigator like Turk as a "layer of oversight", in the event the investigation was ultimately prosecuted and the government needed the credible testimony of such an individual, without exposing Halper as a longtime confidential informant.

Trump's Spygate allegations were rebutted, despite renewed interest in April 2019 after Attorney General William Barr testified to Congress that "spying did occur" on the Trump campaign, although his characterization of "spying" was ambiguous and he was not specific. Prior to his 2016 activities, Halper had a February 2014 encounter at a London intelligence conference with Michael Flynn, then the head of the Defense Intelligence Agency (DIA) and later a Trump supporter and first national security advisor. Halper became so alarmed by Flynn's close association with a Russian woman that a Halper associate expressed concerns to American authorities that Flynn may have been compromised by Russian intelligence. Flynn was forced out of the DIA six months later, although public accounts at the time cited other reasons for his removal, including his management style and views on Islam.

In April 2025, FBI Director Kash Patel released documents related to the FBI’s Crossfire Hurricane investigation. The FBI records reveal that agents found Stefan Halper’s claims about Michael Flynn to be “not plausible” and “not accurate,”

==== Lawsuit ====
The "Russian" woman, former Cambridge academic Svetlana Lokhova sued Halper in 2019 for $25 million, alleging he had conspired with multiple news outlets to spread the false and salacious narrative that she had seduced Flynn on orders from the Russian government. Halper filed a response to the lawsuit in which he declared that he is entitled to the qualified immunity ordinarily afforded to federal agents, "even if the lawsuit's allegations are true". Halper's motion to dismiss stated in part: "Private individuals who participate in FBI investigations are subject to the federal common law qualified immunity applicable to government agents." The suit was dismissed by a three-judge panel of the Fourth Circuit Court of Appeals in April 2021.

=== Department of Justice Report ===
A 2019 Department of Justice report, according to The New York Times, reports that an undercover F.B.I. agent posed as Mr. Halper's assistant during a 2016 London meeting with George Papadopoulos. However, the report's author, Michael Horowitz, did not find any evidence that Mr. Halper tried to infiltrate the Trump campaign.

=== Consideration for Trump administration role ===
Axios reported in May 2018 that during the transition Trump top trade advisor Peter Navarro had recommended Halper for an ambassadorship.

== Personal life ==
Halper's former wife, Sibyl Cline, is the daughter of the former CIA deputy director for intelligence, Ray S. Cline. He retired from Cambridge University in 2015, and now lives in Virginia. He consults for Crossword Cybersecurity chaired by Sir Richard Dearlove, the former head of MI6.

== Books ==
He is the co-author of the bestselling book America Alone: The Neo-Conservatives and the Global Order, published by the Cambridge University Press in 2004, and also co-author of The Silence of the Rational Center: Why American Foreign Policy is Failing (2007). In April 2010, his book The Beijing Consensus: Legitimizing Authoritarianism in Our Time was published by Basic Books. Also a bestseller, it has been published in Japan, Taiwan, China, South Korea, and France.

== Awards ==
Halper is a recipient of the State Department's Superior Honor Award, the Justice Department's Director's Award, and the Defense Department's Superior Honor Award.
