= Crossfire Hurricane (FBI investigation) =

2016–2017 US counterintelligence investigation of Donald Trump's associates

Crossfire Hurricane was the code name for the counterintelligence investigation undertaken by the Federal Bureau of Investigation (FBI) from July 31, 2016, to May 17, 2017, into links between Donald Trump's presidential campaign and Russia and "whether individuals associated with Trump's presidential campaign were coordinating, wittingly or unwittingly, with the Russian government's efforts to interfere in the 2016 U.S. presidential election". Trump was not personally under investigation until May 2017, when his firing of FBI director James Comey raised suspicions of obstruction of justice, which triggered the Mueller investigation.

The investigation was officially opened on July 31, 2016, initially due to information on Trump campaign member George Papadopoulos's early assertions of Russians possessing damaging material on Trump's rival candidate Hillary Clinton which the Russians offered to anonymously release as assistance to the Trump campaign. From late July to November 2016, the joint effort between the FBI, the Central Intelligence Agency (CIA), and the National Security Agency (NSA) examined evidence of Russian meddling in the presidential election. The FBI's team enjoyed a large degree of autonomy within the broader interagency probe.

The FBI's work was taken over on May 17, 2017, by the Special Counsel investigation of 2017–2019, which eventually resulted in the Mueller Report. Mueller concluded that Russian interference occurred in a "sweeping and systematic fashion" and that there were substantial links between Russians and the Trump campaign, but the evidence available to investigators did not establish that the Trump campaign had "conspired or coordinated" with the Russian government.

Trump and his allies repeatedly alleged that the Crossfire Hurricane investigation was opened on false pretenses for political purposes. A subsequent review done by Justice Department Inspector General Michael E. Horowitz, released in redacted form in December 2019, found no evidence that political bias against Trump tainted the initiation of the investigation, but did find that the FBI made 17 errors or omissions in its FISA warrant applications to the Foreign Intelligence Surveillance Court (FISA Court) for surveillance of former Trump aide Carter Page.

On January 23, 2020, two of the four FISA warrants were declared invalid by the Department of Justice. James E. Boasberg, a Washington D.C. federal judge, also said that surveillance collected against Page lacked a legal basis. As a result of this and Attorney General William Barr's beliefs in conspiracy theories about the origins of Crossfire Hurricane, Barr assigned John Durham, the United States attorney for the District of Connecticut, to lead an investigation into Crossfire Hurricane's origins.

On August 19, 2020, a former FBI attorney pleaded guilty to making a false statement stemming from his alteration of an email connected to one of the FISA warrant applications. On October 19, 2020, Barr appointed Durham to be a Special Counsel, elevating the form of the investigation, in this probe. Upon release of his final report, Durham did not recommend charges against any new individuals or recommend wholesale changes to how the FBI conducts controversial investigations. However, he criticized the FBI and Justice Department, stating that they "failed to uphold their important mission of strict fidelity to the law in connection with certain events and activities described in this report" and argued that a full investigation never should have been launched, despite the December 2019 probe by the Justice Department inspector general, which found that sufficient evidence existed to launch the investigation.

== Origins ==
After working on the Ben Carson 2016 presidential campaign as a foreign policy adviser, in early February 2016 George Papadopoulos, codenamed "Crossfire Typhoon" by the FBI, left the Carson campaign. That same month, he moved to London to begin working for the London Centre of International Law Practice (LCILP), with which he had been associated for several months. On March 6, he accepted an offer to work with the Trump campaign. As part of his duties with the LCILP, on March 12 he traveled to the Link Campus University in Rome to meet officials with the university. While on this trip, on March 14 he met Maltese professor Joseph Mifsud and informed the professor about his joining the Trump campaign. On March 21, the Trump campaign told the Washington Post that Papadopoulos was one of five foreign policy advisers for the Trump campaign. Mifsud took more interest in Papadopoulos, and met him in London on March 24 with a Russian woman posing as "Putin's niece".

Mifsud traveled to Moscow in April 2016, and upon his return he told Papadopoulos that Russian government officials were in possession of "thousands of emails" that could be politically damaging to Hillary Clinton. According to reporting by Malta Today about FBI records, Mifsud told the FBI in his February 2017 interviews that he had no advanced knowledge of Russia having emails from the Democratic National Committee, and did not make any offers to Papadopolous. On May 6, Papadopoulos met Alexander Downer, the Australian High Commissioner to Britain in a London bar, and told him about the Clinton emails over drinks. After WikiLeaks released hacked Democratic National Committee (DNC) emails on July 22, the Australian government on July 26 advised American authorities of the encounter between Downer and Papadopoulos. Receipt of this information spurred the FBI's launch of the Crossfire Hurricane investigation on July 31.

In late July 2016, according to his May 2017 testimony to the House Intelligence Committee, CIA director John Brennan convened a group of officials from the CIA, NSA and FBI to investigate Russian interference. In a July 2017 interview, Brennan described this group effort as a "fusion cell". According to his later testimony, Brennan gave the FBI leads involving "contacts and interactions between Russian officials and U.S. persons involved in the Trump campaign" that were beyond the CIA's mandate to pursue. He said this information "served as the basis for the FBI investigation to determine whether such collusion [or] cooperation occurred".

In March 2017, FBI director James Comey confirmed in a congressional hearing that the FBI had been investigating Russian interference as part of its counterintelligence mission. He further confirmed that the probe included links between Trump campaign members and the Russian government, and "whether there was any coordination between the campaign and Russia's efforts". Comey added in a June Senate hearing that President Trump had not been personally under investigation until after Comey's departure from the FBI.

In February 2018, the Nunes memo, written by staff for U.S. representative Devin Nunes, stated: "The Papadopoulos information triggered the opening of an FBI counterintelligence investigation in late July 2016 by FBI agent Pete Strzok", rather than the Steele dossier as asserted by, among others, President Donald Trump, Nunes, and several Fox News hosts such as Tucker Carlson and Sean Hannity. A rebuttal memo by Democrats in the House Intelligence Committee confirmed that the investigation was opened on July 31, 2016, and stated that Christopher Steele's memos "played no role in launching the counterintelligence investigation into Russian interference and links to the Trump campaign". The counter-memo added that the FBI investigative team only received the Steele dossier in mid-September, "because the probe's existence was so closely held within the FBI". The New York Times reported in April 2019 that investigators received the dossier on September 19, 2016.

In April 2018, the House Intelligence Committee, then in Republican control, released a report on Russian interference in the 2016 election, as well as the American response to it. The report corroborated that the FBI opened its counterintelligence probe in late July 2016 "following the receipt of derogatory information about foreign policy advisor George Papadopoulos".

In June 2018, the Department of Justice's Office of the Inspector General released a report on its counter-investigation into the FBI's investigation of the Hillary Clinton email controversy. This report stated: "On July 31, 2016, just weeks after the conclusion of the Midyear investigation [into Clinton], the FBI opened its investigation of Russian interference in the ongoing presidential election [...] the Russia investigation, which touched upon the campaign of then candidate Trump."

The Mueller Report of the Special Counsel investigation, completed in March 2019, states that the Papadopoulos information about Russia having acquired damaging material on Clinton "prompted the FBI on July 31, 2016, to open an investigation into whether individuals associated with the Trump Campaign were coordinating with the Russian government in its interference activities".

A review of Crossfire Hurricane done by Justice Department Inspector General Michael E. Horowitz resulted in a report released in December 2019. The report stated that the following information from a Friendly Foreign Government triggered the investigation: George Papadopoulos "suggested the Trump team had received some kind of suggestion from Russia that it could assist this process with the anonymous release of information during the campaign that would be damaging to Mrs. Clinton (and President Obama)."

Horowitz's review also found that the FBI electronic communication opening the investigation into Papadopoulos said that Papadopoulos "made statements indicating that he is knowledgeable that the Russians made a suggestion to the Trump team that they could assist the Trump campaign with an anonymous release of information during the campaign that would be damaging to the Clinton campaign."

The "Crossfire Hurricane" codename was taken from the opening line of "Jumpin' Jack Flash", a Rolling Stones song. Trump's 2016 campaign had prominently featured another Rolling Stones song, "You Can't Always Get What You Want", at rallies and at the 2016 Republican National Convention.

== Investigations ==
The FBI's concerns became clear after Brennan shared intelligence about Russian interference with Comey in mid-August 2016. The FBI investigation, code named Crossfire Hurricane, had a large degree of independence from inter-agency efforts to investigate Russian interference. According to an April 2018 House Intelligence Committee report, a "fusion cell on Russian election interference, which was comprised of analysts from the CIA, FBI, and NSA [...] operated through the election". The report also wrote that the fusion cell itself stood down in mid-November 2016.

After receiving the Papadopoulos information from the Australian government, the Office of Inspector General reported that "...the initial investigative objective of Crossfire Hurricane was to determine which individuals associated with the Trump campaign may have been in a position to have received the alleged offer of assistance from Russia."(p. 59) The Senate Intelligence Committee took this to mean the Crossfire Hurricane team initially focused attention on confirming "'exactly who Papadopoulos spoke with' as 'it is implausible that Papadopoulos did not' share the offer with members of the Trump campaign."

Crossfire Hurricane initially targeted several people connected to the Trump campaign: Papadopoulos, Michael Flynn, Paul Manafort, Carter Page and Roger Stone.

During the investigation, the FBI used national security letters to obtain phone records and other documents. FBI agents, believing Trump would lose the election, and cognizant of Trump's false claims that the election was rigged against him, were careful to ensure the investigation did not become public, as they feared that if Trump lost he would blame his defeat on the revelation of the investigation. However, after the election, personal texts on December 15, 2016, from FBI lead investigator Peter Strzok to FBI attorney Lisa Page, with whom he was having an affair, showed Strzok was likely aware of what he took to be politically motivated leaks from other intelligence agencies, although the texts showed Strzok and Page themselves typically coordinated their public communications with the FBI press office.

On September 7, 2016, U.S. intelligence passed information to James Comey, director of the Federal Bureau of Investigation, and Peter Strzok, Deputy Assistant Director of Counterintelligence that in late July 2016, John Brennan, Director of the Central Intelligence Agency at the time, had briefed President Barack Obama that U.S. intelligence had indications that Russian intelligence was alleging that U.S. presidential candidate Hillary Clinton had invented a plan for a scandal to link candidate Trump to Vladimir Putin, the DNC email hack, and Wikileaks' release of the emails.

The Office of the Inspector General's June 2018 report states that Peter Strzok, Lisa Page, "and several others from the Midyear investigation [by the FBI into Hillary Clinton] were assigned to the Russia investigation, which [the Office was] told was extremely active during this September and October [2016] time period." Strzok "was assigned to lead the Russia investigation in late July 2016", and E. W. Priestap had a supervisory role over the Russia investigation during an unspecified time period.

This investigation's work continued into May 2017. In May 2019, House Intelligence Committee Chairman Adam Schiff told The Washington Post that after Comey was fired, congressmen were no longer briefed on the status of the FBI counterintelligence investigation into Trump associates, despite the multiple criminal investigations spawning from it.

=== FISA warrants ===
The FBI had surveilled Carter Page under a Foreign Intelligence Surveillance Act (FISA) warrant beginning in 2013 or 2014, on concerns that Russian intelligence was attempting to recruit him. Trump announced his candidacy for president in June 2015, and Page joined his campaign on March 21, 2016. After Michael Isikoff of Yahoo! News reported on September 23, 2016, that Page was being investigated by American intelligence for his contacts with Russian agents, Page immediately left the Trump campaign, while two campaign spokesmen denied he had ever been a part of it.

During the summer of 2016, the FBI applied for a warrant to conduct surveillance on four members of the Trump campaign, but this application was rejected by the FISA court as too broad. On October 21, 2016, the FBI filed a new FISA warrant application for Page alone, expressing the FBI's belief that the Russian government was collaborating with Page and possibly others associated with the Trump campaign, and that Page had been the subject of targeted recruitment by Russian intelligence agencies. The rationale advanced in support of this warrant relied in part on Page's prior activities, in part on intercepts of Russian communications or confidential human intelligence sources, and in part on a "dossier" of raw intelligence findings gathered by British former MI6 agent Christopher Steele.

The Steele dossier alleged that Page had originated the idea of leaking the DNC emails, and that he was negotiating a share of Rosneft in exchange for Trump lifting sanctions against Russia if elected. The application disclosed that the dossier had been compiled by someone "likely looking for information that could be used to discredit" the Trump campaign, but did not disclose that it was indirectly funded as opposition research by the DNC and the Clinton campaign. Steele had previously worked with the FBI and considered trustworthy.

The request was signed by Comey and Deputy Attorney General Sally Yates, and Judge Rosemary M. Collyer issued the warrant, concluding there was probable cause to believe Page was a foreign agent knowingly engaging in clandestine intelligence for the Russian government. The warrant on Page was renewed three times, each for an additional 90 days. The extensions were issued by three different District Court judges: Michael W. Mosman, Anne C. Conway, and Raymond J. Dearie. The first two extensions were signed by Comey, and the last one by his deputy, Andrew McCabe, after Comey was fired. In addition, Acting Attorney General Dana Boente signed the first extension, and Deputy Attorney General Rod Rosenstein signed the last two.

=== Confidential human sources and informants ===
Shortly after the opening of the Crossfire Hurricane investigation on July 31, 2016, the FBI used confidential human sources (CHS) to conduct meetings with individuals affiliated with the Trump campaign. During the 2016 Trump Campaign, the FBI used four CHSs and "a few" undercover agents as part of Crossfire Hurricane, and this "resulted in interactions with Carter Page, George Papadopoulos, and a high-level Trump campaign official who was not a subject of the investigation".

==== Stefan Halper, FBI's "Source 2" ====
The New York Times reported that agents involved in the Russia investigation asked Stefan Halper to approach Carter Page and George Papadopoulos, and it was unclear whether he had been asked to contact Sam Clovis, who was vice-chairman of the Trump campaign. Halper was a retired Cambridge professor at the time, and had long been an informant connected to the intelligence world. The IG report never uses Halper's name, but refers to a "Source 2", whom The Telegraph identified as Halper.

The IG report says "the Crossfire Hurricane team conducted three CHS operations prior to the team's initial receipt of Steele's reporting on September 19, 2016", and describes how FBI CHS "Source 2" contacted three individuals "who were still with the Trump campaign." Halper spoke separately to Page, Clovis, and Papadopoulos, and the three men have acknowledged that they agreed to meet with him. Halper's activities were reported by Andrew C. McCarthy in a May 12, 2018, National Review article, and Donald Trump referred to this report in a tweet accusing the Obama administration of planting a "spy" in his campaign, thus launching the Spygate conspiracy theory.

===== First FBI operation - Page - Crossfire Dragon =====
The first FBI CHS operation was at least four meetings between Halper and Carter Page. Page said he "had extensive discussions" with Halper on "a bunch of different foreign-policy-related topics". The Washington Post reported Page told The Daily Caller his last contact with Halper was in September 2017, which was the month the last FISA warrant on Page expired.

Page and Halper also met at a London symposium on July 11–12, 2016, before the meetings mentioned above, which led critics of the FBI to suspect that the probe started earlier than stated. An anonymous former federal law enforcement official told The New York Times that this earlier contact was coincidental.

===== Second FBI operation - Clovis =====
The second FBI CHS operation took place between "Source 2" and "a high-level official in the Trump campaign who was not a subject of the investigation" on September 1, 2016. The IG report never names that "high-level official", but Sam Clovis stated in a radio interview that he met a professor at a DoubleTree hotel in Arlington, Virginia on September 1, 2016, and that the professor had already met Carter Page and later met Papadopoulos.

The New York Times reported Page had urged Halper to meet with Sam Clovis, and, according to an anonymous source for the Times, the FBI was aware of the meeting but had not instructed Halper to ask Clovis about issues related to the Russia investigation. Clovis said that he and Halper discussed China, not Russia, during their sole meeting. Clovis also said that while Halper only indicated that he was offering his assistance to the Trump campaign, Clovis was concerned that Halper was creating an audit trail to justify continued surveillance of the campaign. The Washington Post reported that Halper requested a second meeting, but it never happened.

===== Third FBI operation - Papadopoulos - Crossfire Typhoon =====
The IG report describes two meetings between "Source 2" and Papadopoulos on September 15, 2016: a brunch meeting and a pre-dinner meeting. The Washington Post reports that Halper met Papadopoulos in London on September 15, 2016, after Halper invited Papadopoulos on September 2, 2016, to come to London and to write a paper on Mediterranean oil fields.

The New York Times reports that Halper was not alone in London; the FBI had sent a female investigator using the pseudonym Azra Turk to meet with Papadopoulos while posing as Halper's assistant. The Times states that Turk's assignment suggests that the FBI wanted a trained investigator to provide a "layer of oversight". The Times further suggests that Turk may have been assigned to serve as a witness in the event the investigation was ultimately prosecuted and the government needed the credible testimony of such an individual without exposing Halper as a longtime confidential informant. Papadopoulos said that Halper arranged for him to go out for drinks with Turk, who he said was a "Turkish National." The New York Times said that Halper accompanied Turk "in one of her meetings" with Papadopoulos.

The IG report says that, according to Crossfire Hurricane case agents, the September 15 meetings that it describes involved an attempt to recreate the conditions of an earlier meeting between Papadopoulos and an FFG (Friendly Foreign Government) official in which they said Papadopoulos had made comments about Russian assistance to the Trump Campaign. In May 2016, Australian FFG officials Alexander Downer and Erika Thompson had met Papadopoulos at a London bar, where Papadopoulos told them that the Russians were in possession of hacked Democratic Party emails containing derogatory information about Hillary Clinton. Two months later, Australian reports to the FBI about this meeting triggered the opening of the Crossfire Hurricane investigation.

During these meetings, Halper asked if Papadopoulos knew of any Russian efforts to interfere in the election; Papadopoulos said he did not. The Crossfire Hurricane team assessed that his denials seemed to be a "rehearsed response", and they "discounted Papadopoulos' denials for a number of reasons".

Stuart Evans, then head of the office of intelligence at DOJ, later said the denial was material to the FISA court case. The denials, and FBI team's assessment of the denials, "should have been shared with Justice Department's office of intelligence (OI) 'in order for [OI] to make the determination whether [those denials] should be in the application'" to the FISA court.

==== FBI "Source 3" - Jeff Wiseman ====
Another FBI CHS named "Source 3", "an individual with a connection to Papadopoulos", was used to interact with Papadopoulos "multiple times between October 2016 and June 2017". In a meeting with Source 3 in late October 2016, Papadopoulos denied that Russia was "playing a big game" in the American presidential election. When he was next asked whether Russia had "special interests", Papadopoulos declared: "that's all bullshit". He added that he knew "for a fact" that the Trump campaign was not involved in the DNC hack, adding that such involvement would have been illegal. When asked if Russia had "interest in Trump", Papadopoulos replied: "no one knows how a president's going to govern anyway". The FBI failed to include these statements in their subsequent FISA warrant applications. In his report, Horowitz included this failure as among the seventeen "inaccuracies or omissions" in the FBI's handling of the FISA warrant application.

==== Michael T. Flynn - Crossfire Razor ====
Walid Phares under code name Cross Wind was also involved in the story.

==== Jeff Sessions, Donald J. Trump - Unknown ====
In the Senate Select Committee on Intelligence (SSCI) report volume 5 on Russian interference it is mentioned that Jeff Sessions, Donald J. Trump have FBI investigations but codenames for them were redacted unlike other codenames that are not redacted.

==== Christopher Steele ====
Christopher Steele served as a paid CHS for the FBI prior to his work related to the election, receiving $95,000 for this work, which an FBI handling agent found "to be valuable and that it warranted compensation". Steele received no compensation from the FBI for the later work he did related to the election. The IG report found that Steele and the FBI had differing views about his role related to Crossfire Hurricane. The FBI initially considered him a CHS, a role in which he was told not to discuss what he found with the media. But Steele was also working for Fusion GPS, a private firm that directed him to share his findings with the media. Steele's contact with the media alarmed the leadership at the FBI, which led them to formally end the FBI's relationship with him in November 2016. However, the FBI continued to receive information from Steele indirectly via senior Justice Department official Bruce Ohr through May 2017.

In early August 2016, he made a trip to Rome, where he briefed four American FBI officials about some of his research, including the first memo from his dossier. During its intense questioning of Steele, the FBI "alluded to some of their own findings of ties between Russia and the Trump campaign" and asked Steele about Papadopoulos, but he said he knew nothing about him.

The agents also "raised the prospect of paying Steele to continue gathering intelligence after Election Day", but Steele "ultimately never received payment from the FBI for any 'dossier'-related information". The subsequent public release of the dossier interrupted discussions between Steele and the FBI. The IG report later confirmed the FBI had initially offered to pay Steele $15,000 for his trip to Rome, but the payment was halted in November 2016 when the FBI formally closed Steele as a CHS because they learned that Steele had shared his research with Mother Jones magazine.

==== Other sources ====
The Inspector General's report determined the FBI had "several other" confidential sources "with either a connection to candidate Trump or a role in the Trump campaign", but that the FBI did not task these sources as a part of the Crossfire Hurricane investigation. One of these FBI sources "held a position in the Trump campaign", but this source did not inform the FBI about their role until they had left the campaign, according to the Inspector General.

The Inspector General wrote his review "found no evidence that the FBI attempted to place any" FBI source in the Trump campaign. The review also "found no evidence" the FBI had tried to "recruit members of the Trump campaign" to serve as their sources. Finally, the review did not produce evidence "political bias or improper motivations influenced" the FBI's usage of confidential sources or undercover agents for interactions with members of Trump's campaign.

It also emerged that, according to one agent, one of these FBI CHSs was a Trump supporter, as were the FBI employees who cultivated this source. These FBI employees exchanged text messages supporting Trump in the 2016 election.

== Transition to Trump administration ==
On January 5, 2017, FBI Director James Comey, Director of National Intelligence James Clapper, CIA Director John Brennan, and NSA Director Mike Rogers briefed President Obama about an intelligence report on Russian interference in the 2016 election, which Obama had ordered in December. The discussion touched on the Steele Dossier and the relationship between incoming National Security Adviser Michael Flynn and Russian Ambassador Sergey Kislyak. Following that briefing, President Obama met with Comey, Vice President Joseph Biden, National Security Adviser Susan Rice, and Deputy Attorney General Sally Yates. Rice documented the meeting two weeks later, on January 20, in an email she sent just before leaving the White House for the last time. According to Rice's email, during the meeting, President Obama stressed that the continuing investigation should be handled "by the book" and that he was not "asking about, initiating, or instructing anything from a law enforcement perspective". The email also stated that Obama directed them to be "mindful to ascertain if there is any reason that we cannot share information fully as it relates to Russia" with members of the incoming administration.

On January 6, Comey, Clapper, Brennan, and Rogers briefed President-elect Trump on the intelligence report. Before the briefing, it was planned that Comey would separately brief Trump on the most salacious aspects of the Steele dossier "in the most discreet and least embarrassing way". As Comey later described it: "At the conclusion of that briefing, I remained alone with the president-elect to brief him on some personally sensitive aspects of the information assembled during the assessment." Comey also assured Trump he was not personally under investigation. He later testified that the FBI leadership had discussed the assurance in advance, and that one member of the team—later revealed to be FBI General Counsel James Baker—had raised concerns about it. Specifically, according to Comey's testimony, Baker felt that although "it was technically true [that] we did not have a counterintelligence file case open on then-President-elect Trump" nevertheless because of the scope of the investigation, Trump's "behavior, his conduct will fall within the scope of that work." Later, in August 2019, the Office of Inspector General released a report quoting witnesses who said Comey, along with the senior leadership at the FBI, "discussed Trump's potential responses to being told about the 'salacious' information, including that Trump might make statements about, or provide information of value to, the pending Russian interference investigation."

In February 2017, The New York Times published a report on Crossfire Hurricane, whose name had not been made public at the time. Citing current and former American officials commenting anonymously on the classified investigation, The New York Times reported that communications intercepts and logs showed that Trump campaign members and Trump associates, including Paul Manafort, had "repeated contacts" with senior Russian intelligence officials "in the year before the election". In June 2017, former FBI director James Comey stated that the February 2017 Times report was "in the main" not true, but did not specify what the inaccuracies were. In July 2020, the Senate Judiciary Committee revealed that FBI counterintelligence agent Peter Strzok, one of the leaders of the investigation, had earlier privately made annotations on the February 2017 Times report in which he stated that the FBI was "unaware of ANY Trump advisors engaging in conversations with Russian intelligence officials," but that they were aware that (a) Carter Page had contacts with Russian intelligence before he joined the Trump campaign, (b) an associate of Manafort had contacts with Russian intelligence, and (c) Trump campaign officials had contacts with the Russian ambassador and the Russian embassy's congressional liaison. The Senate Intelligence Committee ultimately uncovered that Manafort's associate Konstantin Kilimnik was in fact a Russian intelligence official who had contacts with the Trump campaign, though the FBI was apparently unaware of this in the earlier months of 2017 given Strzok's annotations.

== Takeover by special counsel ==
On May 8, 2017, Trump dismissed Comey from his tenure as FBI Director. More than 130 Democratic lawmakers of the United States Congress called for a special counsel to be appointed in reaction to Comey's firing.

On May 17, 2017, Rosenstein appointed Mueller as special counsel under the applicable Department of Justice regulation, and the Special Counsel investigation (also known as the Mueller probe) took over the Crossfire Hurricane efforts, which were still ongoing at the time. Rosenstein's authority to appoint Mueller arose due to Attorney General Jeff Sessions's March 2017 recusal of himself from investigations into the Trump campaign.

In June 2017, Peter Strzok, the FBI agent who had led the Crossfire Hurricane investigation up to this point, became a member of Mueller's team. In August 2017, Strzok was removed from the team and reassigned to the FBI's Human Resources department following the Inspector General's discovery of text messages from Strzok expressing a low opinion of Trump and stating his preference that Clinton should win the election by an overwhelming majority.

=== Criminal charges ===
George Papadopoulos pleaded guilty on October 5, 2017, to making false statements. On January 27, 2017, Papadopoulos had lied to FBI investigators regarding his contacts with Joseph Mifsud, a Maltese professor with connections to Russian government officials. The special counsel's office was unable to fully investigate Papadopoulos's activities with Sergei Millian, a Belarusian native turned American citizen, because Millian did not cooperate with investigators. Millian previously said he had "insider knowledge and direct access to the top hierarchy in Russian politics".

Flynn pleaded guilty on December 1, 2017, to making false statements. On January 24, 2017, Flynn had lied to FBI investigators regarding his contacts with Sergey Kislyak, the Russian Ambassador to the United States.

Manafort pleaded guilty on September 14, 2018, to one count of conspiracy to obstruct justice for witness tampering, and one count of participating in a conspiracy against the United States. NBC News wrote that Manafort's conspiracy charge was related to "money laundering, tax fraud, failing to file Foreign Bank Account Reports, violating the Foreign Agents Registration Act, and lying and misrepresenting to the Department of Justice".

Stone was arrested on January 25, 2019, and charged on seven counts, including witness tampering and lying to investigators.

Page was not charged with a crime by the special counsel investigation. Its report said: "The investigation did not establish that Page coordinated with the Russian government in its efforts to interfere with the 2016 presidential election". However, with incomplete "evidence or testimony about who Page may have met or communicated with in Moscow [...] Page's activities in Russia—as described in his emails with the [Trump campaign]—were not fully explained."

=== Conclusions ===
On March 22, 2019, the Special Counsel investigation was concluded, and the Mueller Report was submitted that day.

The Mueller Report concluded that Russian interference in the 2016 presidential election did occur "in sweeping and systematic fashion" and "violated U.S. criminal law". The first method detailed was "a social media campaign that favored presidential candidate Donald J. Trump and disparaged presidential candidate Hillary Clinton", which also sought to "provoke and amplify political and social discord in the United States". The second method of Russian interference saw the Russian military intelligence service, the GRU, hacking into email accounts owned by people associated with the Clinton presidential campaign or Democratic Party organisations, followed by the publication of damaging hacked material.

To establish whether a crime was committed by members of the Trump campaign with regard to Russian interference, the special counsel's investigators used conspiracy law, and not the concept of "collusion". They used the concept of "coordination": "an agreement—tacit or express—between the Trump campaign and the Russian government on election interference".

The Mueller Report found that the investigation "identified numerous links between the Russian government and the Trump campaign", that Russia "perceived it would benefit from a Trump presidency" and that the 2016 Trump presidential campaign "expected it would benefit electorally" from Russian hacking efforts. Ultimately, "the investigation did not establish that members of the Trump campaign conspired or coordinated with the Russian government in its election interference activities".

However, investigators had an incomplete picture of what had really occurred during the 2016 campaign, due to some associates of Trump campaign providing either false, incomplete or declined testimony, as well as having deleted, unsaved or encrypted communications. As such, the Mueller Report "cannot rule out the possibility" that information then unavailable to investigators would have presented different findings.

== 2019 Justice Department Inspector General report ==
In March 2018, the Justice Department's Inspector General, Michael E. Horowitz, announced that the Office of Inspector General (OIG) had opened a review of the origins of the FBI's Russia investigation, the informants used, and the process followed to authorize surveillance of Carter Page, a foreign policy adviser on the Trump campaign.

On December 9, 2019, Horowitz released his report on the findings of the DOJ OIG investigation. The OIG found no indication that the investigation of Trump and Russia was motivated by political bias, but did make 17 "basic and fundamental" errors and omissions in its warrant applications to the Foreign Intelligence Surveillance Court (FISA) to surveil Carter Page, a foreign policy adviser on the Trump campaign. The report found that the FBI's investigation had a factual basis and was initiated for an authorized purpose, stating: "We did not find documentary or testimonial evidence that political bias or improper motivation influenced" the agency's decision to open the investigation. The report did, however, criticize the FBI for mistakes related to the FBI's application to the FISA Court for a warrant to wiretap Carter Page, and found that in one application to renew the FISA warrant, an FBI lawyer had altered an email from a CIA liaison to make it appear Page had not been a source for the CIA, although Page had in fact "been approved as an operational contact for the [CIA] from 2008 to 2013". The report did not speculate on whether the warrant application would have been rejected had "any particular misstatement or omission, or some combination thereof" been corrected. During Senate testimony after the report's release, Horowitz attributed the warrant problems to "gross incompetence and negligence" rather than intentional malfeasance or political bias, and stated: "The activities we found don't vindicate anyone who touched this. The actions of FBI agents were not up to the standards of the FBI." As a result of the findings, Horowitz announced a broader review of the FBI's FISA warrant application process, to study whether problems with the process are systemic.

The report debunked claims, promoted by Trump and his allies, that the Steele dossier had prompted the Russia investigation, and reiterated that the FBI investigation had in fact started in late July 2016, based on a tip from Australian officials regarding Trump campaign adviser George Papadopoulos. The report also refuted Trump's assertions that Peter Strzok and Lisa Page had initiated the investigation; that decision was made by William Priestap, the assistant FBI director for the Counterintelligence Division. The report criticized the FBI, however, for relying on information from the Steele dossier even though one of Steele's sources told the agency that his statements had been mischaracterized or exaggerated. The OIG investigation found no support for Trump's claims that President Obama had ordered the wiretapping of Trump Tower. The OIG also found no support for Trump's claims that the FBI had implanted a "spy" within his 2016 campaign, finding "no documentary or testimonial evidence that political bias or improper motivations influenced the FBI's decision" to use informants (known within the FBI as "confidential human sources" or "undercover employees") "to interact with Trump campaign officials in the Crossfire Hurricane investigation".

FBI Director Christopher A. Wray said he accepted the OIG's findings and had "ordered more than 40 corrective steps to address the Report's recommendations", and added it was "important that the inspector general found that, in this particular instance, the investigation was opened with appropriate predication and authorization". Trump responded by attacking Wray by name on Twitter. Attorney General William Barr rejected the OIG's key conclusion and continued to assert that the FBI's investigation into Trump was unjustified. James Comey, the director of the FBI who oversaw the Trump-Russia investigation and was fired in May 2017 by Trump, acknowledged the "significant mistakes" identified by the inspector general, but staunchly defended the FBI and criticized Trump's attacks on investigators. In an op-ed published in the Washington Post, Comey wrote: "the truth is finally out, ... and those who smeared the FBI are due for an accounting" and called upon Attorney General Barr to "acknowledge the facts" and "stop acting like a Trump spokesperson."

== Durham special counsel investigation ==
In May 2019, Attorney General William Barr assigned John Durham, the United States Attorney for the District of Connecticut, to lead an investigation into the origins of the FBI probe, whether surveillance was adequately predicated, and potential overreach by FBI or Department of Justice leadership.

In December 2019, Justice Department Inspector General Michael E. Horowitz released findings that the investigation was properly opened on a factual and legal basis, while also identifying 17 "significant errors or omissions" in the FBI's FISA applications. Barr and Durham publicly disagreed, stating their belief the evidence justified opening only a preliminary rather than a full investigation.

On December 1, 2020, Barr revealed that on October 19, 2020, he had appointed Durham as a Special Counsel to examine whether "any federal official, employee, or any other person or entity violated the law in connection with the intelligence, counter-intelligence, or law-enforcement activities directed at the 2016 presidential campaigns."

On May 15, 2023, Durham released his final report. The report concluded that the FBI used "raw, unanalyzed, and uncorroborated intelligence" to launch a full investigation when only a preliminary investigation was warranted, and that the bureau applied a different standard when evaluating concerns about the Clinton campaign. Durham criticized the FBI and Justice Department for failing "to uphold their important mission of strict fidelity to the law." The report did not recommend additional indictments or significant changes to FBI practices.

== See also ==
- Russia investigation origins conspiracy theory
- Timelines related to Donald Trump and Russian interference in United States elections
