= George Papadopoulos =

American political advisor (born 1987)

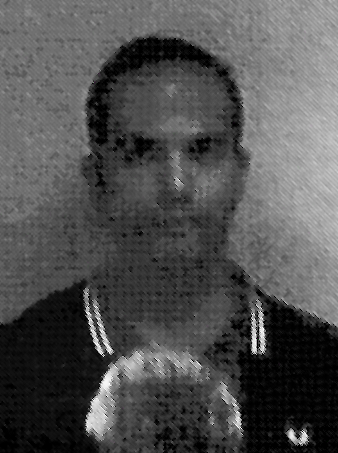
- Born: George Demetrios Papadopoulos; August 19, 1987 (age 39); Chicago, Illinois, U.S.
- Other name: Crossfire Typhoon
- Citizenship: United States; Greece
- Education: DePaul University (BA); University College London (MSc)
- Criminal status: Released from prison on December 7, 2018; pardoned on December 22, 2020
- Spouse: Simona Mangiante (m. 2018)

George Demetrios Papadopoulos (/ˌpæpəˈdɒpələs/ PAP-ə-DOP-əl-əs; born August 19, 1987) is an author and former member of the foreign policy advisory panel to Donald Trump's 2016 presidential campaign. On October 5, 2017, Papadopoulos pleaded guilty to a felony charge of making false statements to FBI agents about the timing and the possible significance of his contacts in 2016 relating to U.S.–Russia relations and the Trump presidential campaign. In 2018, he served twelve days in federal prison, then was placed on a 12-month supervised release.

During his supervised release from prison, he participated in the filming of a docuseries. In March 2019, Papadopoulos released his book, Deep State Target: How I Got Caught in the Crosshairs of the Plot to Bring Down President Trump. He was pardoned by Trump in December 2020.

He ran in the March 2020 primary for the November general election to replace the U.S. representative Katie Hill in California's 25th congressional district, after Hill resigned, but lost, receiving 2.3% of the vote. He is pending to announce a run for Illinois's 8th congressional district in the 2026 United States House of Representatives elections.

== Early life and education ==
George Papadopoulos was born August 19, 1987, at Swedish Hospital in Chicago, Illinois, to Greek immigrants parents originally from Thessaloniki. His father, Antonis, was heavily involved in the local politics of the Greek-American community and is the former president of the Pan-Macedonian Union of the United States. His mother, Kate (Kiki), was born in Greece, but later moved to Worcester, Massachusetts. He grew up in Lincolnwood, Illinois and attended Niles West High School in Skokie, Illinois, graduating in 2005. He then attended DePaul University, graduating with a Bachelor of Arts in political science in 2009. He earned a Master of Science in Security Studies in 2010 at University College London, writing his thesis about "deleterious effects of low governance and state capacity levels in the Middle East" in November 2010. He speaks Arabic, English, French and Greek. He lived in Europe until March 2016 when he moved back to Chicago.

== Career ==
Papadopoulos worked as an unpaid intern at the Hudson Institute from 2011 to 2015 specializing in the eastern Mediterranean and later worked as a contract research assistant to a senior fellow at the institute. Richard Weitz, a Wikistrat "expert", managed George Papadopoulos while he was at the Hudson Institute. According to CNN, Papadopoulos described himself as an "oil, gas, and policy consultant" on his LinkedIn profile.

In 2010, following the rupture in relations between Turkey and Israel due to the Mavi Marmara incident, Papadopoulos became involved in eastern Mediterranean energy development projects and policy focusing upon the relations of Israel, Cyprus and Greece, also known as the Energy Triangle. In 2014, Papadopoulos authored op-ed pieces in several Israeli publications. In one, published in the Arutz Sheva, Papadopoulos argued that the U.S. should focus on its "stalwart allies" Israel, Greece, and Cyprus to "contain the newly emergent Russian fleet"; in another, published in Haaretz, he contended that Israel should exploit its natural gas resources in partnership with Cyprus and Greece rather than Turkey. On 19 October 2015, Russian President Vladimir Putin and Israeli Prime Minister Benjamin Netanyahu agreed to allow major concessions for Gazprom to develop the Leviathan gas field; Putin told Netanyahu, "We will make sure there will be no provocation against the gas fields by Hezbollah or Hamas. Nobody messes with us."

Investigative reporting conducted by Haaretz in 2017 showed that Papadopoulos co-authored an expert opinion, on behalf of the Hudson Institute that was delivered to the Israeli Energy Ministry on June 20, 2015, about a proposed plan to develop the Leviathan offshore gas fields in Israel's territorial waters. Money was donated to Hudson by the CEO of Noble Energy and other staffers of the company. Houston-based Noble Energy is heavily invested in Israeli gas with the Israeli energy group Delek Drilling. Noble Energy was initially given permission on December 17, 2015, to develop the Leviathan gas field worth up to $120 billion (~$159 billion in 2025).

In September 2015, Papadopoulos left the Hudson Institute and joined Energy Stream, a London energy consultancy, as an oil and gas consultant for four months before joining Ben Carson's presidential campaign.

Beginning in December 2015 and while living in London, Papadopoulos served on the National Security and Foreign Policy Advisory Committee for Ben Carson's campaign for the 2016 Republican presidential nomination. In early February 2016, he began work as a director at the London Centre of International Law Practice but left the Carson campaign in mid-February 2016 and moved from London to Chicago in March 2016.

Former Trump campaign adviser Michael Caputo described Papadopoulos's role in the Trump's 2016 election campaign as a volunteer "coffee boy".

In 2019, Papadopoulos announced he had joined the board of advisors for the medical cannabis company C3, which manufactures the marijuana pill Idrasil.

In September 2024, reports emerged that George Papadopoulos had joined the editorial board of the website intelligencer.today, alongside contributors associated with Kremlin-affiliated media. The company associated with intelligencer.today lists a Los Angeles business address, which was provided by board member Igor Lopatonok. Lopatonok’s business address is in Moscow.

== Involvement in Donald Trump's presidential campaign ==
While living in London, Papadopoulos first reached out to Donald Trump's campaign on August 4, 2015, expressing interest in “an advisory role to Mr. Trump on matters of energy security and U.S. policy in the Eastern Mediterranean." Further unsuccessful emails in an effort to obtain a position in the Trump campaign followed, but in December 2015, with the Ben Carson campaign on the verge of suspending, Papadopoulos believed that parts of the Carson campaign would be assumed by the Trump campaign, and decided to pursue this route.

Papadopoulos sent his résumé to the Ben Carson presidential campaign, which hired him as a foreign policy adviser for two-and-a-half months, December 2015 through mid-February 2016. Sam Clovis, who at the time was national co-chairman of Trump's campaign team, approved him as an unpaid adviser. In his campaign job interview via Skype from London on March 6, Clovis allegedly told Papadopoulos that one of the campaign's foreign policy priorities was to improve U.S.–Russia relations, though Clovis later denied saying that.

Employed at that time with the London Centre of International Law Practice (LCILP), on March 12, 2016, Papadopoulos was part of an LCILP visiting delegation to the Link Campus University in Rome, a university associated with Italian intelligence agencies. There he met Joseph Mifsud, a Maltese academic with alleged ties to Russian intelligence who was at the time a teacher at the University of Stirling in Scotland.

=== Joins Trump team ===
On March 21, 2016, in an interview with the editorial board of The Washington Post, Trump announced Papadopoulos as one of his campaign's foreign policy advisers. Trump, reading from a list, said: "He's an oil and energy consultant, excellent guy."

On March 24, Papadopoulos met with Mifsud in London. Papadopoulos said that Mifsud was accompanied by a Russian woman, Olga Polonskaya, whom Mifsud falsely identified as the niece of the Russian President. On the same day, Papadopoulos performed nine internet searches of various combinations attempting to find Olga Polonskaya as a niece of President Putin or former President Medvedev. Mifsud, in a later interview, denied he said this.

On March 31, 2016, Papadopoulos joined candidate Trump as well as Senator Jeff Sessions and other campaign officials for a National Security Meeting at the Trump Hotel in Washington, D.C. Papadopoulos averred that he could facilitate a foreign policy meeting between candidate Trump and Russian President Vladimir Putin.

From March to August 2016, Papadopoulos "was identified as having contacts with senior members of the Trump campaign on at least a dozen occasions." Papadopoulos's wife, then his fiancée, said in 2017 that his job in the campaign was to set up meetings with foreign leaders and that he had been in regular contact with high-ranking campaign officials. Papadopoulos sent emails concerning meeting with Putin to at least seven campaign officials.

At a breakfast meeting at the Andaz London Liverpool Street hotel on April 26, 2016, Mifsud told Papadopoulos that he had information that the Russians have "dirt" on Hillary Clinton, namely, "the Russians had emails of Clinton, they have thousands of emails."

On May 10, 2016, at London's Kensington Wine Rooms, Papadopoulos allegedly told the Australian High Commissioner to the United Kingdom, Alexander Downer, who was accompanied by Australian diplomat Erika Thompson, that "one of the reasons [Trump would win] was that ... the Trump team had received some kind of suggestion from Russia that it could assist this process with the anonymous release of information during the campaign that would be damaging to Mrs Clinton (and President Obama)."

=== Greece ===
On May 21, campaign chairman Paul Manafort forwarded an email from Papadopoulos to his deputy Rick Gates requesting to arrange trips to Greece and to Russia for Trump, saying: "We need someone to communicate that [Donald Trump] is not doing these trips. It should be someone low-level in the campaign so as not to send any signal." Gates delegated the task to the campaign's correspondence coordinator, referring to him as "the person responding to all mail of non-importance."

Papadopoulos later said that he had told the Greek Foreign Minister, Nikos Kotzias, during a meeting on May 26, 2016, that the Russians had Clinton-related emails. He said his "biggest regret" was not immediately reporting Mifsud's comment to U.S. intelligence, and the "stupidest thing I did was actually gossiping about it with foreign diplomats".

=== Russia ===
Between March and September 2016, Papadopoulos made at least six requests for Trump or representatives of his campaign to meet in Russia with Russian politicians. Senator Richard Burr, the chair of the Senate Intelligence Committee, which investigated Russian interference in the 2016 United States elections, said in October 2017 that the panel was interested in Papadopoulos because he had sent e-mails attempting to set up meetings between Trump and Putin. The recipients of emails about outreach to the Russian government reportedly were Clovis, Corey Lewandowski, Manafort, Gates, representative of the Russian Ministry of Foreign Affairs Ivan Timofeev, and others.

Beginning in the spring of 2016, Papadopoulos met several times with Panos Kammenos, a Greek politician who allegedly had numerous close ties to Russian intelligence, Vladimir Putin, and the Kremlin group tasked with interfering in the 2016 United States elections. Kammenos formed the Athens-based Institute of Geopolitical Studies which in November 2014 signed a "memorandum of understanding" with the former SVR officer Leonid Reshetnikov headed the Russian Institute for Strategic Studies (RISI). In 2009, RISI, which had been an SVR operation, was placed under control of the Russian president with Reshetnikov regularly meeting with Putin and participated in Russian interference in the 2016 United States elections by developing plans of action: for example, with Russian intelligence assets and using a large disinformation campaign, Putin would support Republicans and the Trump campaign and disrupt Democrats and the Clinton campaign, and, if Trump were likely to lose the 2016 election, then Russia would shift its efforts to focus upon voter fraud in the United States in order to undermine the legitimacy of the United States electoral system and the elections. Kammenos' positions followed closely with the Kremlin's talking points.

After working on the Ben Carson 2016 presidential campaign as a foreign policy adviser, in early February 2016, Papadopoulos, later codenamed "Crossfire Typhoon" by the FBI, left the Carson campaign. That same month, he moved to London to begin working for the London Centre of International Law Practice (LCILP), with which he had been associated for several months. On March 6, he accepted an offer to work with the Trump campaign. As part of his duties with the LCILP, on March 12 he traveled to the Link Campus University in Rome to meet officials with the university.

While on this trip, he met Maltese professor Joseph Mifsud on March 14 and informed the professor about his joining the Trump campaign. On March 21, the Trump campaign told the Washington Post that Papadopoulos was one of five foreign policy advisers for the Trump campaign. Mifsud took more interest in Papadopoulos, and met him in London on March 24 with a Russian woman posing as "Putin's niece".

Mifsud traveled to Moscow in April, and upon his return he told Papadopoulos that Russian government officials were in possession of "thousands of emails" that could be politically damaging to Hillary Clinton. On May 6, Papadopoulos met Alexander Downer, the Australian High Commissioner to Britain in a London bar, and told him about the Clinton emails over drinks. This admission was important. Peter Strzok, former FBI deputy assistant director of counterintelligence, wrote:

Papadopoulos's admission predated the release of the stolen Democratic email on the website DCLeaks, and Julian Assange and WikiLeaks hadn't yet made comments about the future release of Clinton's email. None of the information about Russia's cybertheft was in the public domain. In other words, Papadopoulos had somehow learned about the hacking operation before the public did and had advance knowledge of the Russian plan to use that information to hurt Clinton's campaign. Even the FBI hadn't known about it at that time. (p. 110)

Despite his communications with members of the Trump campaign regarding Russia, the Mueller Report found no evidence that Papadopoulos ever shared information with the Trump campaign regarding Russia having "dirt" on Hillary Clinton in the form of her emails or that Russia could assist the campaign through the anonymous release of information about Clinton.

After receiving the Papadopoulos information from the Australian government, the Office of Inspector General reported that "...the initial investigative objective of Crossfire Hurricane was to determine which individuals associated with the Trump campaign may have been in a position to have received the alleged offer of assistance from Russia."(p. 59) The Senate Intelligence Committee took this to mean the Crossfire Hurricane team initially focused attention on confirming "'exactly who Papadopoulos spoke with' as 'it is implausible that Papadopoulos did not' share the offer with members of the Trump campaign."

On June 19, Sam Clovis, as Trump national campaign co-chairman, encouraged Papadopoulos to fly to Russia to meet with agents of the Russian Foreign Ministry. This occurred after Papadopoulos had been told by Joseph Mifsud that Russia had "dirt" on Clinton in the form of thousands of stolen emails that Russia wanted to share with Trump's campaign, but before there was public knowledge of the hacks of the Democratic National Committee and John Podesta's emails, the latter two hacks believed by U.S. intelligence agencies to have been carried out by Russian hackers.

On July 26, after WikiLeaks released the hacked Democratic National Committee (DNC) emails, the Australian government advised American authorities of the encounter between Downer and Papadopoulos. Receipt of this information spurred the FBI's launch of the Crossfire Hurricane investigation on July 31.

On August 10, the FBI opened a FARA case on Papadopoulos based largely upon information it received on July 26, from the Australian government originating from an Australian diplomat meeting with Papadopoulos in early May in London. The FBI counterintelligence expert Bill Priestap informed Congress in June 2018 that as there was a predicated counterintelligence operation in effect, the FBI did not spy on the Trump campaign but did investigate possible ties to Russia. British intelligence was informed of the FBI FARA case on Papadopoulos and did not halt the FBI's operation from being conducted on the soil of the United Kingdom where GCHQ could assist with the FBI in the FARA case involving Papadopoulos but the GCHQ gave no comment about its role according to a May 2, 2019, New York Times article.

After arriving in London on September 15, Papadopoulos met in a private London club with a United States citizen, FBI informer, and Cambridge professor, Stefan Halper, and a female posing as Halper's female research assistant who had invited Papadopoulos for drinks. The research assistant was an FBI investigator with the pseudonym "Azra Turk", but Papadopoulos later stated that he believed she "was CIA" with ties to "Turkish intel" and was tasked to learn about his work in the Energy Triangle which involves Cyprus-Greece-Israel, and competes with the interests of Northern Cyprus and Turkey.

As foreign policy adviser during Trump's campaign, Papadopoulos helped set up a September 23, 2016, New York meeting between Trump and Abdel Fattah el-Sisi, the Egyptian president.

In early October 2016, Papadopoulos was dismissed from the campaign following a poorly-received interview with Interfax.

On January 20, 2017, just hours before Trump was going to be inaugurated, Papadopoulos and incoming White House Chief of Staff Reince Priebus met with Greek Defense Minister Panos Kammenos. Two days later, Papadopoulos met with the head of Israel's Shomron Regional Council, Yossi Dagan, in Washington, D.C. Papadopoulos was reported to have communicated to Dagan the Trump administration's desire to work closely with Israel on the question of Israel's West Bank settlements.

== Arrest and guilty plea ==
The Statement of Facts of Guilt, filed October 5, 2017, and unsealed October 30, 2017, showing the facts admitted by Papadopoulos as part of his guilty plea

December 2020 pardon granted by Trump

Papadopoulos was interviewed by FBI agents on January 27, 2017, regarding any Trump campaign connections with Russia. After the interrogation, on the advice of his counsel, Papadopoulos deactivated his Facebook account, which contained correspondences with Russians, and created a new account. On July 27, 2017, Papadopoulos was arrested upon landing at Washington-Dulles International Airport, placed in handcuffs and leg shackles, and put in a prison cell overnight for his arraignment the following day. He was released without bail and subsequently cooperated with Special Counsel Robert Mueller in his investigation.

On October 5, 2017, Papadopoulos pleaded guilty in the U.S. District Court for the District of Columbia to making false statements to FBI agents relating to contacts he had with agents of the Russian government while working for the Trump campaign. The guilty plea was part of a plea bargain reflecting his cooperation with the Mueller investigation. Papadopoulos's arrest and guilty plea became public on October 30, 2017, when court documents showing the guilty plea were unsealed. Following his guilty plea, Trump described Papadopoulos as a "young, low level volunteer named George, who has already proven to be a liar" and said few people in his campaign had heard about Papadopoulos. FactCheck.org and PolitiFact, among others, noted that during the campaign, Trump, reading from a script, named Papadopoulos as one of his five foreign policy advisers—alongside Keith Kellogg, Carter Page, Walid Phares and Joseph Schmitz—and described Papadopoulos as an "excellent guy".

In a sentencing memorandum released on August 17, 2018, prosecutors stated that a sentence of zero to six months was "appropriate and warranted," noting that Papadopoulos had repeatedly lied to investigators and did not provide "substantial assistance" to the investigation, and that his lies had interfered with the investigators' ability in their February 11, 2017 interview of Joseph Mifsud to question and if necessary detain him. Mifsud left the United States about two weeks after Papadopoulos's January 27 interview with the FBI. On September 7, 2018, Papadopoulos was sentenced to 14 days in prison, 12 months of supervised release, and 200 hours of community service; he was also fined $9,500 (~$12,180 in 2025). He began serving his 14-day sentence on November 26, 2018, at FCI Oxford in Oxford, Wisconsin, and was released 12 days later on December 7, 2018.

== Allegations of entrapment ==
Papadopoulos has consistently stated his belief that he was entrapped by people in various government intelligence agencies in order to justify FBI surveillance of the Trump campaign. He fleshed out this belief in his 2019 book Deep State Target. Papadopoulos's theory is that the plan was for Mifsud, whom he characterized as a Western intelligence operative, to give Papadopoulos information about Russian hacking of Hillary Clinton's emails, and then for Downer to get Papadopoulos to repeat those same allegations to Downer, in order to establish that the Trump campaign was secretly working with the Russians and begin surveillance. Papadopoulos believes that Downer was recording the conversation with his phone in an obvious manner. Downer has denied all of these charges. In an August 2017 interview, Mifsud denied telling Papadopoulos about his Russian connections, saying that he had "absolutely no contact with the Russian government."

Papadopoulos has claimed that this alleged entrapment was indirectly coordinated via the London Centre for International Law Practice, an organization that hired him and were among the first to find out, in 2016, that he was planning to join the Trump campaign. A 2017 investigation by reporters for The Washington Post found that no one was there at the supposed address for the LCILP during regular business hours, and that some of the people listed on the LCILP website as being members of the organization had no knowledge of it.

Papadopoulos has also pointed to another 2016 meeting, with Stefan Halper, a Cambridge University professor with ties to the FBI and CIA, that he believes was designed to elicit incriminating statements from him. Papadopoulos has said that Halper brought with him an attractive, flirtatious woman, who introduced herself as "Azra Turk", who Papadopoulos believes was meant to serve as a honeypot to elicit information. A 2019 article in The New York Times described Turk as an FBI informant, but the FBI has refused to comment on the matter.

In May 2018, Trump described Halper's efforts as "Spygate", a debunked conspiracy theory.

=== Status of Joseph Mifsud ===
Much of the discussion about the veracity of Papadopoulos's claims has centered around Joseph Mifsud, the Maltese professor who first met Papadopoulos about a week after Papadopoulos joined the Trump campaign. Papadopoulos has described him as working for Western intelligence, while others have called this a conspiracy theory and some have even called Mifsud an asset of Russian intelligence. Mifsud has not made any public statements since October 2017. In September 2018, a court filing said that Mifsud was missing, had not been heard from in months, and "may be deceased". He officially remains missing, although in April 2019 the Italian newspaper Il Foglio stated that he was still alive and hiding out in an apartment in Rome.

Stephan Roh, Mifsud's lawyer, has repeatedly stated that Mifsud was working for Western intelligence, and that he is hiding out for his own protection as a result. Roh co-wrote, with Thierry Pastor, the book The Faking of Russia-Gate: The Papadopoulos Case: An Investigative Analysis, which argued this case; the book was self-published in June 2018.

The Justice Department inspector general aggressively investigated the allegation by Papadopoulos that Mifsud had been directed to entrap him, but found no information that Mifsud was part of an FBI operation. The New York Times reported that its sources claimed Mifsud was a Russian agent. American law enforcement believes Mifsud is connected to Russian intelligence.

Some critics of the Russia investigation have embraced Papadopoulos's view of Mifsud. During Robert Mueller's testimony to two congressional committees on July 24, 2019, Republican Congressmen Jim Jordan and Devin Nunes sought to portray Mifsud as a central figure in what they asserted was an investigation based on false and politically motivated premises, while Democrats characterized their assertion as a diversion and conspiracy theory.

Papadopoulos's view has been echoed by Trump allies, including former New York City Mayor Rudy Giuliani and U.S. Senator Lindsey Graham. In October 2019, Senator Graham, as chairman of the Senate Judiciary Committee, wrote a letter to the leaders of Britain, Australia and Italy, asserting that both Mifsud and Downer had been directed to contact Papadopoulos, and asking for their help in continuing the investigation. Joe Hockey, the Australian ambassador to the United States, sharply rejected Graham's characterization of Downer. A former Italian government official told The Washington Post in October 2019 that during a meeting the previous month, Italian intelligence services told Barr they had "no connections, no activities, no interference" in the matter; Italian prime minister Giuseppe Conte later affirmed this.

A December 2019 report on the FBI's Russia investigation, headed by Department of Justice Inspector General Michael E. Horowitz, found no evidence that Mifsud had ever worked for the FBI.

== Personal life ==
As of October 2017, Papadopoulos had lived for the past few years with his mother and brother in the Ravenswood neighborhood of Chicago. In March 2018, he married Simona Mangiante, an Italian lawyer who used to work for the European Parliament. He had met her through Mifsud. During the months between his guilty plea and his sentencing, she became his public spokeswoman. In a September 9 interview on This Week, she said her previous work as a diplomat at the European Parliament could have raised a "red flag" with Mueller's investigation. She commented, "I always said I respect Mueller's interest in my profile because clearly it's quite alarming, the fact that I marry George Papadopoulos in the middle of this storm." George Papadopoulos said that even his family had been concerned that she might be a Russian spy and that "everyone was a little paranoid throughout this past year".

In 2018 his wife predicted that Papadopoulos's role in the Russia investigation would be similar to that of John Dean of the Watergate scandal. Democrats on the United States House Permanent Select Committee on Intelligence later arranged for her to testify before the committee, but the plans fell through when the Republican majority refused to reimburse her for travel expenses from Chicago.

== Book authored ==
- Papadopoulos, George (March 26, 2019). Deep State Target: How I Got Caught in the Crosshairs of the Plot to Bring Down President Trump. Diversion Books. ISBN 978-1635764932.

== See also ==
- 2016 Democratic National Committee email leak
- Durham special counsel investigation
- Mueller report
- Russian interference in the 2016 United States elections
