= Bruce Ohr =

American government official

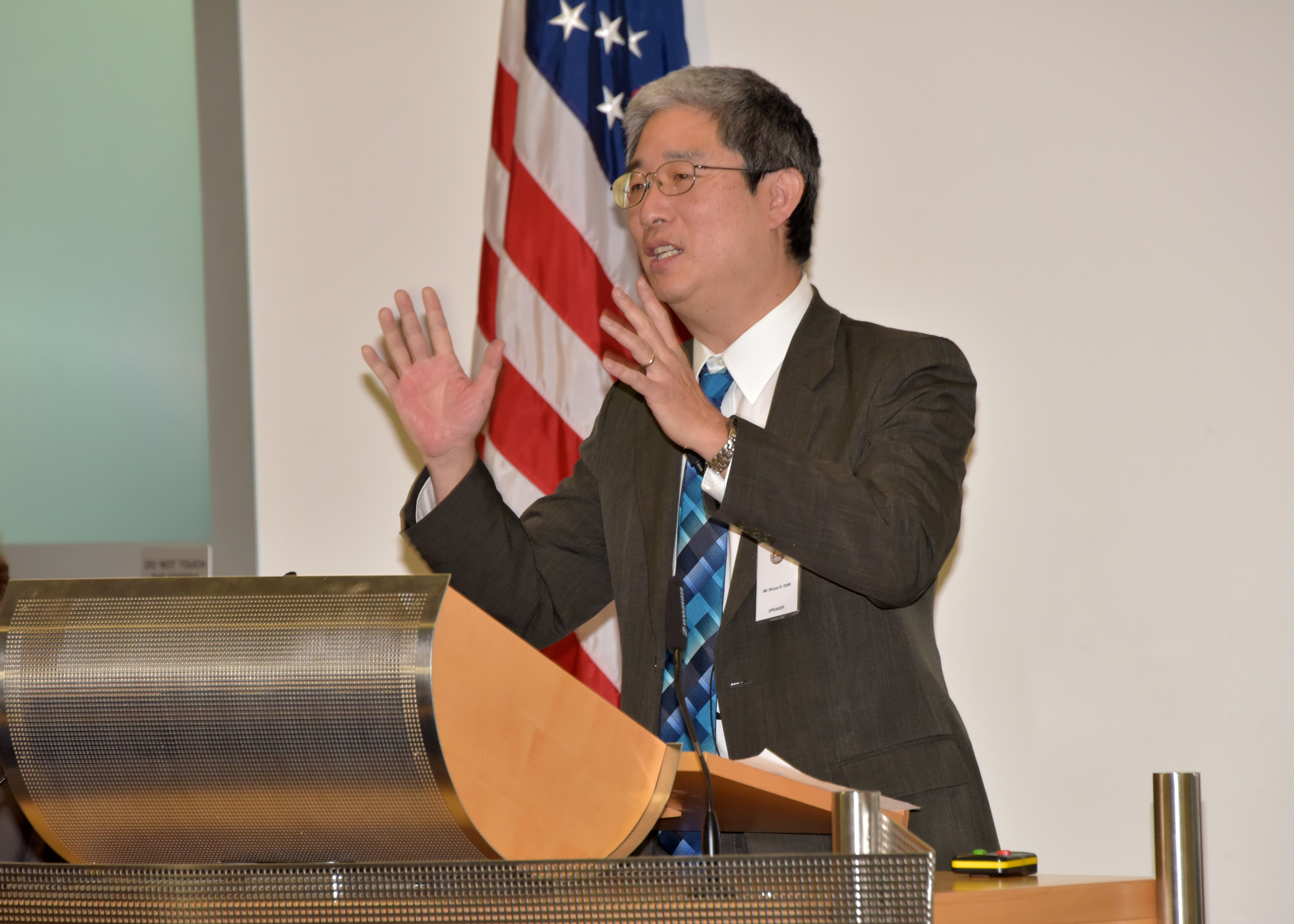
- Born: Bruce Genesoke Ohr
- Citizenship: American
- Education: Oak Ridge High School (Tennessee); Harvard University

Bruce Genesoke Ohr is a former United States Department of Justice official. A former associate deputy attorney general and former director of the Organized Crime Drug Enforcement Task Force (OCDETF), as of February 2018 Ohr was working in the Justice Department's Criminal Division. He is an expert on transnational organized crime and has spent most of his career overseeing gang and racketeering-related prosecutions, including Russian organized crime.

Ohr was little-known until 2018, when he became the subject of scrutiny when he was involved in the start of the probe into Russian interference in the 2016 election. He was criticized by President Donald Trump, who accused him of helping Christopher Steele compile the dossier and criticized his wife's work for Fusion GPS The Department of Justice Inspector General found that Ohr had made "consequential errors in judgment" in failing to inform his supervisors about his contacts with Steele and the FBI, and referred his conduct to the Department's Office of Professional Responsibility. On September 30, 2020, Ohr retired from his position at DOJ "after his counsel was informed that a final decision on a disciplinary review being conducted by Department senior career officials was imminent".

== Early life and education ==
Bruce Ohr is of Korean heritage, being the child of Korean immigrants. He graduated from Oak Ridge High School in Oak Ridge, Tennessee, in 1980. He graduated from Harvard College in 1984 with a degree in physics and graduated from Harvard Law School in 1987.

== Career ==
Ohr worked for a law firm in San Francisco before becoming a career civil servant at the U.S. Department of Justice, ultimately rising to the rank of associate deputy attorney general. He was an assistant U.S. Attorney in the Southern District of New York from 1991 to 1999, and was head of the office's Violent Gangs Unit before joining the Justice Department's Washington headquarters as the head of the Organized Crime and Racketeering Section of the Criminal Division, where Ohr managed teams investigating and prosecuting crime syndicates in Russia and eastern Europe. In 2006, Ohr was one of a number of U.S. government officials who made the decision to revoke the visa of Oleg Deripaska, a Russian oligarch and Vladimir Putin ally.

In 2010, Ohr moved to a new position as counsel for international relations in DOJ's Transnational organized crime and international affairs section. In 2014 he became director of the Organized Crime Drug Enforcement Task Force (OCDETF).

In 2014–2016, Bruce Ohr was involved in a wide–ranging clandestine effort by the U.S. government to recruit Russia's richest men close to Vladimir Putin, such as Oleg Deripaska, as informants for the U.S. government. During this time, Ohr had contacts with the former British intelligence officer Christopher Steele, whom he had first met in 2007. Steele was also involved in this effort. Steele later authored the Steele dossier in 2016. The New York Times reported that this recruitment effort did not "appear to have scored any successes"; and in Deripaska's case, Deripaska is said to have even notified the Russian authorities about the American effort to recruit him.

Ohr later became associate deputy attorney general, but lost that position in late 2017, although he remained director of OCDETF for a time. Ohr was later demoted by the Department of Justice amid the Senate Intelligence Committee's discovery of his meetings with Christopher Steele and Fusion GPS founder Glenn Simpson.

== Russia probe ==
Ohr had repeated contacts with FBI agents during the fall and winter of 2016–2017, where he shared information he had received from Steele's dossier research. During this time, Ohr failed to inform his supervisors in the Justice Department of his role. The dossier was prepared under a contract to the DNC and the Clinton campaign, by the opposition research firm Fusion GPS. During the 2016 election, Bruce's wife, Nellie Ohr, a Russia specialist, worked for Fusion GPS as an independent contractor. Nellie Ohr, according to a Republican-led investigation, conducted "research and analysis" of Donald Trump for Fusion GPS. A 2018 ABC News report cited a source familiar with her work as saying Nellie Ohr "was not directly involved in the dossier project." In her October 2018 congressional testimony, Nellie Ohr denied having knowledge of the Justice Department's Russia investigation and denied sharing her research with anyone outside Fusion GPS. However, according to a Senate Judiciary Committee press release reported on by the Washington Examiner and other outlets, a 2019 FBI analysis declassified in 2025 found that she "may have been involved in drafting aspects of the Steele Dossier," noting an analytical error in her research identical to one in the dossier, and that she provided a thumb drive of her Fusion GPS research to her husband, who gave it to the FBI.

Steele had been an official source of intelligence for the FBI in the Russian-interference probe before the election, until he was terminated as a source in November 2016 for unauthorized contacts with the media. Following the election, Steele continued to provide information to Ohr at the Justice Department, who forwarded this information to the FBI. FBI agents interviewed Ohr a dozen times regarding contacts with Steele, recording interviews in classified form "302 reports". These were provided to Senator Chuck Grassley on May 21, 2018, along with "63 pages of unclassified emails and notes documenting Mr. Ohr’s interactions with Mr. Steele".

Ohr's contacts with Steele were mentioned in the controversial Nunes memo, written by Devin Nunes, chair of the Republican-led House Intelligence Committee, which was released in February 2018.

The Nunes memo, which focused on the Justice Department's process for obtaining a FISA warrant on Trump associate Carter Page in October 2016, accused Steele of being biased against Trump, stating he was "desperate" and "passionate" that Trump would lose. The memo said Ohr knew about this bias and that it was not reflected in the FISA applications. Ohr was not assigned to counterintelligence matters and was not thought to have played a direct role in obtaining the warrants.

The Inspector General later found that Ohr met with the Crossfire Hurricane team 13 times, passing information from Steele after the FBI had terminated Steele as a source.BBC News theorized that Ohr's documentation of Steele's opinions "somewhat [undercuts] the accusation of rampant bias within the department." However, the IG found that although Ohr documented Steele's bias, this information was not adequately disclosed to the FISA court.

In 2018, Ohr became the subject of political controversy over his role in the Russia investigation. Republicans alleged that Ohr's contacts with Steele indicated bias in the investigation's handling. The New York Times asserted that FBI officials had kept the investigation quiet during the campaign "in part to ensure that it did not hurt his electoral chances." President Trump and many Republicans claimed that the Steele dossier was used to start the investigation; however, the Inspector General found that the investigation was triggered by information about George Papadopoulos, though the dossier later played a "central and essential role" in the FISA applications. This origin of the probe is additionally confirmed in the Nunes memo itself. Deputy Attorney General Rod Rosenstein initially stated that as far as he knew, Ohr was not involved with the Russia investigation, and told the House Judiciary Committee that Ohr had "no role" in the investigation; he later told the Inspector General that learning of Ohr's operational involvement was "shocking" to him.

Trump called Ohr a "disgrace" in a tweet in August 2018 and suggested that he would revoke Ohr's security clearance. Trump's threat to strip Ohr of his security clearance came amid threats to revoke the security clearances of a number of current and former officials who had criticized Trump or been involved in the Russia probe. According to The Washington Post, White House press secretary Sarah Huckabee Sanders and her deputy Bill Shine discussed the best timing to announce the revocations as a way of distracting from unfavorable news cycles. Rep. Jim Jordan, a critic of the probe into Russian interference in the 2016 election, called for Ohr's firing.

On August 28, 2018, Ohr gave testimony in a closed hearing to two Republican-led House committees looking into decisions made by the DOJ ahead of the 2016 presidential election.

The Inspector General Michael E. Horowitz later found that Ohr had "committed consequential errors in judgment" by failing to inform supervisors of his contacts with Steele and the FBI, and referred Ohr's conduct to the Department's Office of Professional Responsibility. Ohr resigned from the Justice Department in 2020 while under disciplinary review.

== See also ==
- Crossfire Hurricane (FBI investigation)
- Steele dossier
- Foreign Intelligence Surveillance Court
- Russian interference in the 2016 United States elections
