= Inspector General report on the Crossfire Hurricane investigation =

2019 OIG Report on Russia-Trump Election Ties

PDF of this report

Review of Four FISA Applications and Other Aspects of the FBI's Crossfire Hurricane Investigation is a report by the United States Department of Justice Office of the Inspector General which was released on December 9, 2019, by Inspector General Michael E. Horowitz. The report reviewed the Crossfire Hurricane investigation by the Federal Bureau of Investigation (FBI), which looked into whether people associated with the Donald Trump 2016 presidential campaign coordinated with Russian interference in the 2016 United States elections.

Several issues examined by the report were: the origins of the Crossfire Hurricane investigation, the FBI's usage of reports from Christopher Steele, the FBI's applications to the Foreign Intelligence Surveillance Court to surveil former Trump campaign adviser Carter Page, and the FBI's use of confidential human sources as part of the investigation, among other issues.

== Basis of the report ==
In July 2016, the Crossfire Hurricane investigation was started by the Federal Bureau of Investigation (FBI). The investigation looked into whether people associated with the Donald Trump 2016 presidential campaign coordinated with Russian interference in the 2016 United States elections.

On March 18, 2018, Department of Justice Inspector General Michael Horowitz announced that his office would initiate a review in response to requests from the Attorney General Jeff Sessions and members of Congress. This announcement came in the wake of allegations by conservative politicians of misconduct by the FBI and the United States Department of Justice (DOJ). The Republican Party's Nunes memo alleged that the DOJ and FBI abused the Foreign Intelligence Surveillance Act (FISA) in their applications to the Foreign Intelligence Surveillance Court (FISC) to surveil Carter Page, a former member for the 2016 Trump campaign. The Nunes memo also alleged that it was not disclosed that the Steele dossier used to justify the applications was indirectly funded in part by the Hillary Clinton 2016 presidential campaign, and that the dossier had unconfirmed information. President Donald Trump criticized Sessions' decision to have Horowitz lead the review, calling it "DISGRACEFUL" as he labelled Horowitz "an Obama guy".

The report was based on a review of over 1 million Justice Department and FBI documents, as well as 170 interviews of over 100 witnesses.

The Office of Inspector General (OIG) does not have the power to subpoena individuals who are not current employees of the government. As such, the investigation was unable to interview Glenn Simpson of the company Fusion GPS, as well as ex-Department of State employee Jonathan Winer, because they denied interview requests by the OIG.

The OIG also does not have the power to prosecute individuals, but is limited to making criminal referrals to the Department of Justice.

== Findings ==
=== Origins of Crossfire Hurricane ===
The Inspector General stated that the review did not find evidence that "political bias or improper motivation influenced" the opening of the Crossfire Hurricane investigation. It was also determined that the opening of the overall investigation "was in compliance" with policies set by the FBI and the Department of Justice. Likewise, the review did not produce evidence that "political bias or improper motivation influenced the decisions to open the four individual investigations" of George Papadopoulos, Paul Manafort, Michael Flynn and Carter Page, who were either associated or formerly associated with Donald Trump's 2016 presidential campaign.

The review found that there was an "authorized purpose" and "adequate factual predication" for launching the Crossfire Hurricane investigation. It was confirmed that the investigation was opened due to information shared by a foreign government on George Papadopoulos, which indicated that Papadopoulos was aware of Russia's possession and potential release of information damaging to Trump's rival presidential candidate Hillary Clinton. Meanwhile, information provided by Christopher Steele was confirmed to have "played no role" in the investigation's opening. The information on Papadopoulos, which "reasonably indicated activity constituting either a federal crime or a threat to national security" may have happened, "was sufficient to predicate the investigation" given the "low threshold" needed to open such an investigation.

=== FISA applications ===
While the review did not find evidence that "political bias or improper motivation influenced the FBI's decision to seek FISA authority on Carter Page", it did find 17 "significant inaccuracies and omissions" in the FBI's four FISA applications made to the Foreign Intelligence Surveillance Court to obtain warrants for the surveillance of Page. According to the Inspector General, "serious performance failures" reflected badly on "the FBI chain of command's management and supervision" of the FISA processes. The report specifically highlighted the FBI's reliance on information provided by former British intelligence officer Christopher Steele, finding that these reports played a crucial role in justifying surveillance of Page, but that, after gathering information that called Steele's reliability into question, the FBI failed to properly disclose the issues with his reports.

In the FISA applications, there was an omission of information that Carter Page had been approved as an "operational contact" (Note: "which meant that the agency could ask Page questions about things he may have learned in the normal course of his activities, but could not assign him to go out and gather information.") for the Central Intelligence Agency (CIA) from 2008 to 2013, and that Page provided information to the CIA about his contacts with Russian intelligence officers. This information was provided by the CIA to the FBI in August 2016. Instead, the FBI claimed that Page had a "dated" relationship with the CIA in 2007 or earlier.

In a FISA application, Kevin Clinesmith, a lawyer for the FBI, altered an email from the CIA to say that Page was "not a source" for the CIA, despite the CIA representative stating that Page was a direct source of information to the agency. As a result, the Department of Justice did not approach the CIA to determine Page's connection to them. The alteration of the email ultimately lead to Clinesmith pleading guilty to one count of making a false statement.

The judge at his plea hearing asked Clinesmith if, when he added "and not a source" to the email, that he knew it was "in fact not true". Clinesmith told the court: "At the time I thought the information I was providing was accurate, but I am agreeing the information I inserted was not originally there, and I inserted the information." Judge James Boasberg said that Clinesmith "'likely believed' that the information he inserted into the email was true, and that he was just 'taking an inappropriate shortcut' to save himself some work....[and that] Clinesmith obtained no personal benefit from his actions, and that the Justice Department's inspector general had found no evidence that Clinesmith acted out of political bias."

There was an assertion by the FBI to the court that previous information from Christopher Steele had been "corroborated and used in criminal proceedings", when in actuality, the OIG reported that Steele's reporting "was never used in a criminal proceeding", while a group within the FBI had reviewed Steele's past work as "minimally corroborated". Also there was an omission of information that discrepancies between Steele's statements and those of some sources "raised doubts about the reliability" of some of Steele's reporting to the FBI.

=== Use of confidential human sources ===
The Inspector General determined that the FBI had "several" confidential sources "with either a connection to candidate Trump or a role in the Trump campaign". These sources were "not tasked as part of" the Crossfire Hurricane investigation by the FBI, concluded the Inspector General. One of these FBI sources "held a position in the Trump campaign", but this source did not inform the FBI about their role until they had left the campaign, according to the Inspector General.

The Inspector General wrote that his review "found no evidence that the FBI attempted to place any" FBI source in the Trump campaign. The review also "found no evidence" that the FBI had tried to "recruit members of the Trump campaign" to serve as their sources. Finally, the review did not produce evidence that "political bias or improper motivations influenced" the FBI's usage of confidential sources or undercover agents for interactions with members of Trump's campaign.

It also emerged that one of the sources who provided information to the FBI was a Trump supporter, as were the FBI employees handling this source. These FBI employees exchanged pro-Trump and anti-Clinton text messages.

== Reactions ==
After the report was released, Attorney General William Barr rejected the report's key conclusion that Crossfire Hurricane was justified. Barr opined that the Crossfire Hurricane investigation was launched "on the thinnest of suspicions that, in my view, were insufficient to justify the steps taken. It is also clear that, from its inception, the evidence produced by the investigation was consistently exculpatory."

U.S. Attorney John Durham, who is conducting the Durham special counsel investigation a similar investigation at the behest of Barr, also disagreed with the report's findings, stating that: "Based on the evidence collected to date, and while our investigation is ongoing, last month we advised the Inspector General that we do not agree with some of the report's conclusions as to predication and how the FBI case was opened." After Durham's statement received significant criticism, Barr said the statement "was necessary to avoid public confusion" because the media was reporting "that the issue of predication was sort of done and over".

After the report's release, Horowitz attributed the warrant problems to "gross incompetence and negligence" rather than intentional malfeasance or political bias, and stated: "The activities we found don't vindicate anyone who touched this. The actions of FBI agents were not up to the standards of the FBI." in a Senate hearing As a result of the findings, Horowitz announced a broader review of the FBI's FISA warrant application process, to study whether problems with the process are systemic. Horowitz reacted to Barr and Durham's statements in congressional testimony by stating that his office stands by their finding. Horowitz expressed surprise at Durham's statement, and in subsequent testimony stated his view that conclusions should not be announced until an investigation is complete. Horowitz testified that he had met Durham in November 2019 and requested from Durham any information relevant to the review by his office. Horowitz also testified that he was not given information by Barr or Durham that would change his finding that the investigation was justified. According to Horowitz, Durham's opinion at the time of their meeting was that the information on Papadopoulos was "sufficient to support [a] preliminary investigation", but not necessarily the "full counterintelligence investigation" that Crossfire Hurricane was. A preliminary investigation allows the FBI to use confidential human sources, but not the court-ordered surveillance which Carter Page was subjected to.

James Comey, who had been the FBI Director during the Crossfire Hurricane investigation, claimed in a Washington Post op-ed and on cable news shows that he was vindicated by the report's findings. In subsequent congressional testimony, when asked whether the report vindicates Comey, Horowitz said that it "doesn't vindicate anyone at the FBI who touched this, including the leadership". Horowitz also stated that it would be "fair" to wonder how the 17 events in the FISA applications his office discovered "could be purely incompetence". Comey later responded to the report's findings of 17 "significant errors and omissions" made by the FBI in the FISA applications involving Page and conceded that he had been wrong: Horowitz "was right, I was wrong. I was overconfident, as director, in our procedures." He admitted that members of the FBI were sloppy and that the Horowitz report did find "mistakes and negligence", but staunchly defended the FBI and criticized Trump's attacks on investigators. In an op-ed published in the Washington Post, Comey wrote: "the truth is finally out, ... and those who smeared the FBI are due for an accounting" and called upon Attorney General Barr to "acknowledge the facts" and "stop acting like a Trump spokesperson."

Foreign Intelligence Surveillance Court presiding judge Rosemary Collyer reacted to the report by stating that it "calls into question whether information contained in other FBI applications [to the Foreign Intelligence Surveillance Court] is reliable." Judge Collyer ordered the FBI to explain how the FBI will address problems with the FISA process that were uncovered by the report. On January 10, 2020, the FBI responded to the court by providing a list of 12 changes to procedures regarding its applications to the court, which included having more training, and improving checklists. This response was released to the public. The court subsequently appointed David S. Kris, a former senior official in the Obama administration and an expert on FISA, to advise the court on the proposed changes in the FBI's procedures. On January 15, 2020, Kris filed a 15-page brief with the court in which he stated that the proposed changes do not appropriately address the problems uncovered by the IG report.

FBI director Christopher A. Wray said he accepted the OIG's findings and had "ordered more than 40 corrective steps to address the Report's recommendations", and added it was "important that the inspector general found that, in this particular instance, the investigation was opened with appropriate predication and authorization". Trump responded by attacking Wray by name on Twitter.

== See also ==
- Bruce Ohr
- Spygate (conspiracy theory)
- Steele dossier
