= Christopher Steele =

British intelligence officer, author of Steele dossier

- Born: Christopher David Steele; 24 June 1964 (age 62); Aden, South Arabia (now Yemen)
- Citizenship: United Kingdom
- Education: Girton College, Cambridge (BA)
- Occupations: Secret Intelligence Service (1987–2009); Private intelligence consultant
- Known for: Steele dossier
- Spouses: Laura Hunt (m. 1990; died 2009) Katherine Steele (m. 2012)
- Children: 4

Christopher David Steele (born 24 June 1964) is a British former intelligence officer with the Secret Intelligence Service (MI6) from 1987 until his retirement in 2009. He ran the Russia desk at MI6 headquarters in London between 2006 and 2009. In 2009, he co-founded Orbis Business Intelligence, a London-based private intelligence firm.

Steele became the focus of controversy after he authored a 35-page series of memos for a controversial political opposition research report known as the Steele dossier. It was prepared for Fusion GPS, a firm hired by an attorney associated with the Hillary Clinton 2016 presidential campaign. The dossier claims, based on anonymous sources, that Russia collected a file of compromising information on Donald Trump and that his presidential campaign conspired to cooperate with Russian interference in the 2016 United States elections.

Trump and his allies have falsely claimed the Crossfire Hurricane FBI probe into Russian interference was launched due to Steele's dossier. The Republican-controlled House Intelligence Committee concluded in an April 2018 report that the FBI probe had been triggered by previous information from Trump adviser George Papadopoulos; the February 2018 Nunes memo reached the same conclusion.

== Early life ==
Christopher David Steele was born in the Yemeni city of Aden (then part of the British-controlled Federation of South Arabia), on 24 June 1964. His parents, Perris and Janet, met while working at the Met Office, the United Kingdom's national weather service. His paternal grandfather was a coal miner from Pontypridd in Wales. Steele was raised in Aden, the Shetland Islands, and Cyprus, attending a British forces school in Cyprus, a sixth form college in Berkshire, and then spending a 'seventh' or additional term at Wellington College, Berkshire.

Steele matriculated at Girton College, Cambridge in 1982. While at the University of Cambridge, he wrote for the student newspaper, Varsity. In the Easter term of 1986, Steele was president of the Cambridge Union debating society. He graduated with a degree in social and political sciences in 1986.

== Career ==
Steele was recruited by MI6 directly following his graduation from Cambridge, and initially worked in London at the Foreign and Commonwealth Office (FCO) from 1987 to 1989. From 1990 to 1993, Steele worked under diplomatic cover as an MI6 officer in Moscow, serving at the Embassy of the United Kingdom in Moscow. Steele was an "internal traveller", visiting newly-accessible cities such as Samara and Kazan.

He returned to London in 1993, working again at the FCO until his posting with the British Embassy in Bangkok in 1998 and then shortly after to Paris in the same year, where he served under diplomatic cover until 2002. The identity of Steele as an MI6 officer and those of a hundred and sixteen other British spies were revealed in an anonymously published list.

Steele spent time teaching new MI6 recruits. From 2004 to 2009, he served as a senior officer under John Scarlett, Chief of the Secret Intelligence Service (MI6). Steele was a counterintelligence specialist and was selected as case officer for Alexander Litvinenko, participating in the investigation of the Litvinenko poisoning in 2006. Between 2006 and 2009, he headed the Russia Desk at MI6. Steele worked for MI6 for a total of 22 years.

Since 2009, Steele has avoided travel to Russia. In 2012, an Orbis informant quoted an FSB agent describing him as an "enemy of Mother Russia". Steele has also refrained from travelling to the United States since his authorship of the Steele dossier became public, citing the political and legal situation. In 2018, Russian double agent Boris Karpichkov alleged that Steele was included on a hit list of the Russian Federal Security Service, along with Sergei Skripal who was poisoned that year.

== Private sector career ==
In March 2009, Steele and fellow MI6-retiree Chris Burrows co-founded the private intelligence agency Orbis Business Intelligence, Ltd., based in Grosvenor Square Gardens.

In 2010, The Football Association (FA), England's domestic football governing body, organised a committee in the hope of hosting the 2018 or 2022 World Cups. The FA hired Orbis to investigate FIFA. In advance of the FBI launching its 2015 FIFA corruption case, members of the FBI's Eurasian Organized Crime Task Force met with Steele in London to discuss allegations of possible corruption in FIFA. Steele's research indicated that Russian Deputy Prime Minister Igor Sechin had rigged the bidding of the 2018 World Cups by employing bribery.

In 2012, Orbis was subcontracted by a law firm representing Oleg Deripaska. Between 2014 and 2016, Steele cooperated with the FBI and Justice Department in unsuccessful efforts to recruit Deripaska as an informant.

Between 2014 and 2016, Steele created over 100 reports on Russian and Ukrainian issues, which were read within the United States Department of State, and he was viewed as credible by the United States intelligence community. The business was commercially successful, grossing approximately $20,000,000 in the first nine years of operation.

Steele ran an investigation dubbed "Project Charlemagne", which noted Russian interference in the domestic politics of France, Italy, Germany, Turkey, and the United Kingdom. In April 2016, Steele concluded that Russia was engaged in an information warfare campaign with the goal of destroying the European Union.

In November 2018, Steele sued the German industrial group Bilfinger, alleging that the company owed €150,000 for an investigation into Bilfinger's activities in Nigeria and Sakhalin.

According to the Organized Crime and Corruption Reporting Project (OCCRP), in 2023, Texas-based Steward Health Care hired Audere International, a London-based private intelligence firm, to target Fraser Perring, a critic of Steward and the founder of Viceroy Research, a short-selling firm. Audere paid Steele 29,000 British pounds to advise British Member of Parliament Liam Byrne on how to ask a parliamentary question about Perring and alleged Russian short-selling attacks. According to the OCCRP, Audere provided text for a proposed question to Steele, who confirmed he had sent the question to Byrne with minor changes. The OCCRP wrote:

A private intelligence firm working for a disgraced U.S. healthcare operator fed what appears to be false information to a British politician, leading him to claim in parliament that a well-known businessman was a Russian agent, leaked communications show.

== Steele dossier ==
=== Background and Fusion GPS ===
In September 2015, The Washington Free Beacon, a conservative publication, retained Fusion GPS, a Washington D.C. political research firm, to conduct research on Republican primary candidates including Trump. The research was not primarily related to Russia and ended once Trump secured the nomination.

Fusion GPS was subsequently hired by the Hillary Clinton campaign and the Democratic National Committee through their attorney Marc Elias at Perkins Coie. Fusion GPS then hired Steele to investigate possible Russia-related activities by Trump. This investigation produced what became known as the Steele dossier.

In July 2016, Steele provided a report to an FBI agent in Rome, the same agent with whom he had worked on the FIFA investigation. Two individuals affiliated with Russian intelligence were also aware of Steele's election investigation at this time.

In September 2016, Steele held off-the-record meetings with journalists from The New York Times, The Washington Post, Yahoo! News, The New Yorker, and CNN. In October 2016, Steele spoke with David Corn of Mother Jones; Corn's October 31 article was the first to publicly reference information from the dossier, though it did not identify Steele or publish the dossier itself.

=== Stated motivations ===
Steele said he provided the dossier to both British and American intelligence officials because he believed the material represented a national security concern for both countries. According to Glenn Simpson, the Fusion GPS co-founder who hired Steele, Steele approached the FBI because he was concerned that Trump was being blackmailed by Russia.

In a 2018 procedural ruling in the Gubarev defamation case, Senior Master Barbara Fontaine said Steele was "in many respects in the same position as a whistle-blower" in his actions sharing the dossier with Senator John McCain and briefing sections to the media.

=== End of cooperation with FBI ===
Steele first became a confidential human source (CHS) for the FBI in 2013 in connection with the FIFA corruption case, though he considered the relationship contractual rather than a formal CHS arrangement. The Inspector General report on the Crossfire Hurricane investigation noted "divergent expectations about Steele's conduct," as Steele considered his first duty to his paying clients rather than to the FBI.

At the Durham trial in October 2022, FBI supervisory counterintelligence analyst Brian Auten testified that, shortly before the 2016 election, the FBI offered Steele "up to $1 million" if he could corroborate allegations in the dossier, but that Steele could not do so. Steele disputed this characterization, stating on Twitter that the funds were offered to resettle sources willing to testify publicly, not to "prove up" the reporting.

In November 2016, after Steele discussed his findings with the press, the FBI formally closed him as a confidential human source, though the FBI continued contact with Steele through DOJ official Bruce Ohr.

=== Post-election work on the dossier ===
Steele continued to work for Fusion GPS on the dossier without a client to pay him. After the election, Steele's dossier "became one of Washington's worst-kept secrets, and journalists worked to verify the allegations". On 18 November 2016, Sir Andrew Wood, British ambassador to Moscow from 1995 to 2000, met with U.S. Senator John McCain at the Halifax International Security Forum in Canada, and told McCain about the existence of the dossier. Wood vouched for Steele's professionalism and integrity. In early December, McCain obtained a copy of the dossier from David J. Kramer, a former U.S. State Department official working at Arizona State University. On 9 December 2016, McCain met with FBI Director James Comey to pass on the information.

In a second memo Steele wrote in November 2016, after the termination of his contract with Fusion GPS, he reported that Russian officials had claimed that Russia had blocked Donald Trump from nominating Mitt Romney to be his Secretary of State, due to Romney's hawkishness on Russia.

=== Revealed identity ===
On 11 January 2017, The Wall Street Journal revealed that Steele was the author of the dossier about Trump, citing "people familiar with the matter". Although the dossier's existence had been "common knowledge" among journalists for months at that point and had become public knowledge during the previous week, Steele's name had not been revealed. The Telegraph asserted that Steele's anonymity had been "fatally compromised" after CNN published his nationality.

The Independent reported that Steele left his home in England several hours before his name was published as the author of the dossier, as he was fearful of retaliation by Russian authorities. In contrast, The Washington Post reported that he left after he had been identified earlier in the day by the initial The Wall Street Journal report.

On 7 March 2017, as some members of the United States Congress were expressing interest in meeting with or hearing testimony from Steele, he re-emerged after weeks in hiding, appearing publicly on camera and stating, "I'm really pleased to be back here working again at Orbis's offices in London today".

=== Disclosure and reactions ===
In early January 2017, a two-page summary of the dossier was presented to US President Barack Obama and incoming US President Donald Trump in meetings with Director of National Intelligence James Clapper, FBI Director James Comey, CIA Director John Brennan, and NSA Director Admiral Mike Rogers.

On 10 January 2017, BuzzFeed News was the first media outlet to publish the full 35-page dossier. In publishing the Trump dossier, BuzzFeed said it had been unable to verify or corroborate the allegations. The UK issued a DSMA notice on 10 January 2017, requesting that the media not reveal Steele's identity, although the BBC and other UK news media released the information in news stories the same day. Trump said the dossier's allegations were "fake news" during a press conference. Vladimir Putin also dismissed the claims.

Ynet, an Israeli online news site, reported that US intelligence advised Israeli intelligence officers to be cautious about sharing information with the incoming Trump administration, until the possibility of Russian influence over Trump, suggested by Steele's report, has been fully investigated.

Former British ambassador to Russia, Sir Tony Brenton, read Steele's report. Speaking on Sky News he said, "I've seen quite a lot of intelligence on Russia, and there are some things in it which look pretty shaky". Brenton expressed some doubts due to discrepancies in how the dossier described aspects of the hacking activities, as well as Steele's ability to penetrate the Kremlin and Russian security agencies, given that he is an outsider.

On 15 March 2017, former Acting CIA Director Michael Morell raised questions about the dossier. He was concerned about the accuracy of the information, due to the approach taken by Steele to gather it. Steele gave money to intermediaries and the intermediaries paid the sources. Morell said, "Unless you know the sources, and unless you know how a particular source acquired a particular piece of information, you can't judge the information—you just can't." Morell, described as a "Clinton ally" by NBC News, strongly believes that Russia attempted to influence the election via social media, but that there is "smoke but no fire" on Trump's collusion with Russia. In a 2020 Washington Post editorial, Morell summarized his view that Russia launched a "human intelligence operation" against the Trump campaign, and that several officials in the Trump campaign may have passed on information due to "naivete".

=== Relationship to Crossfire Hurricane investigation ===
The dossier did not trigger the opening of the FBI's Crossfire Hurricane investigation; that investigation was opened on July 31, 2016, based on information about Trump campaign adviser George Papadopoulos. However, the dossier was subsequently used in applications for FISA surveillance warrants on Trump campaign adviser Carter Page, with the December 2019 DOJ Inspector General report finding the dossier "played a central and essential role" in those applications.

In early February 2018, the Nunes memo, written by staff of Republican U.S. Representative Devin Nunes (who was at the time Chair of the House Intelligence Committee), acknowledged that information on George Papadopoulos "triggered the opening of" the FBI's counterintelligence investigation in late July 2016. However, the memo argued that the Steele dossier "formed an essential part" of the FISA warrant application for Carter Page and that the FBI had not adequately disclosed Steele's political motivations to the FISA court.

In late February 2018, a rebuttal memo by Democrats on the committee, led by ranking member Adam Schiff, agreed that Steele's reporting "played no role in launching the counterintelligence investigation," noting it "did not reach the counterintelligence team investigating Russia at FBI headquarters until mid-September 2016, more than seven weeks after the FBI opened its investigation." However, the Democratic memo disputed the Nunes memo's characterization of the FISA process, arguing that the FBI had disclosed Steele's potential political bias to the court and that "DOJ cited multiple sources to support the case for surveilling Page" beyond the dossier.

Subsequent government investigations examined the FBI's use of the dossier. The December 2019 DOJ Inspector General report identified 17 significant errors and omissions in the FISA applications that relied on the dossier, including the FBI's failure to disclose Steele's potential political motivations and information from Steele's primary sub-source that contradicted the dossier's claims. Special Counsel John Durham's May 2023 report concluded that the FBI used Steele's reports in FISA applications "within days of receipt" despite being "unvetted and unverified," and that the FBI "did not and could not corroborate any of the substantive allegations" contained in the dossier.

=== Role in subsequent investigations ===
In the summer of 2017, two Republican staffers for the United States House Permanent Select Committee on Intelligence travelled to London to investigate the dossier, visiting the office of Steele's lawyer but not meeting with Steele. In August 2018, Representative Devin Nunes, Chair of the House Intelligence Committee, travelled to London in an attempt to meet with the heads of MI5, MI6, and GCHQ for information about Steele, but was rebuffed by the three agencies.

Steele reportedly revealed the identities of the sources used in the dossier to the FBI. Investigators from Robert Mueller's Special Counsel investigation team met with Steele in September 2017 to interview him about the dossier's claims. The United States Senate Select Committee on Intelligence was in contact with lawyers representing Steele.

Over the course of two days in June 2019, Steele was interviewed in London by investigators from the United States Department of Justice Office of the Inspector General regarding the Steele dossier. They found his testimony surprising and his "information sufficiently credible to have to extend the investigation".

=== Legal action ===
Several Russian individuals and entities named in the dossier filed defamation and data protection lawsuits against Steele, BuzzFeed, and Fusion GPS in the United States and United Kingdom.

==== Gubarev litigation ====
Russian tech entrepreneur Aleksej Gubarev sued both BuzzFeed (in Florida) and Steele (in the UK) after the dossier accused him and his company Webzilla of having "knowing involvement" in the hacking of Democratic Party computer systems.

In December 2018, a federal judge in Florida granted BuzzFeed's motion for summary judgment on First Amendment grounds, ruling that the dossier was a document of public concern that had been briefed to two successive presidents. BuzzFeed had redacted references to Gubarev and issued a public apology shortly after the original publication. Gubarev's lawyer noted that the ruling did not suggest the allegations were true.

In October 2020, the UK High Court dismissed Gubarev's lawsuit against Steele. Justice Mark Warby ruled that the allegations were defamatory and their publication "caused serious harm to his reputation," finding Gubarev "would have been entitled to substantial damages" had he proven the defendants were responsible for the publication. However, the court concluded that Steele could not be held legally responsible for BuzzFeed's publication of the dossier.

==== Alfa Bank litigation ====
Alfa Bank executives Mikhail Fridman, Petr Aven, and German Khan sued Steele in both Washington, D.C. and the UK over claims in the dossier that they had delivered "large amounts of illicit cash" to Vladimir Putin when Putin was deputy mayor of St. Petersburg. The U.S. lawsuit was dismissed in August 2018 on First Amendment grounds.

In July 2020, the UK High Court ruled against Steele in what was his first defeat in dossier-related litigation. Justice Mark Warby found that claims in the dossier were "inaccurate or misleading as a matter of fact." The court found that the allegation about a former Alfa executive delivering payments to Putin was inaccurate because documentary evidence showed the individual did not begin working for Alfa until after Putin left the deputy mayor position. Steele acknowledged in cross-examination that the allegation was inaccurate. The court ordered Steele's firm, Orbis Business Intelligence, to pay £18,000 (approximately $23,000) each to Fridman and Aven for violating the UK Data Protection Act.

The Alfa Bank executives also sued Fusion GPS in October 2017. That lawsuit was voluntarily dismissed in March 2022 after Alfa Bank was sanctioned by the United States and European Union following Russia's invasion of Ukraine.

=== Senate Republicans' referral for a criminal investigation ===
On January 5, 2018, Senate Judiciary Committee Chairman Chuck Grassley and Subcommittee Chairman Lindsey Graham referred Steele to the Justice Department for investigation of potential violations of 18 U.S.C. § 1001 (false statements to federal authorities). Both senators stated the referral was "for further investigation only" and was "not intended to be an allegation of a crime."

The referral alleged that Steele had made inconsistent statements to the FBI about his contacts with the media. Specifically, a September 2016 Yahoo News article by Michael Isikoff containing information similar to the dossier was cited in the FISA application as apparent corroboration, but Grassley and Graham alleged Steele had denied being Isikoff's source when he in fact was. The referral noted that the FISA application "relied more heavily on Steele's credibility than on any independent verification or corroboration for his claims."

Committee Democrats, led by ranking member Dianne Feinstein, released a rebuttal arguing the referral "provides no evidence that Steele was ever asked about the Isikoff article, or if asked that he lied." Feinstein noted the FBI had suspended its relationship with Steele in October 2016 after learning of his media contacts with a different reporter, and had informed the FISA court of this in subsequent renewal applications. Steele was not charged as a result of the referral.

=== U.S. Inspector General findings ===
On December 9, 2019, the DOJ Office of the Inspector General released a 434-page report examining the FBI's Crossfire Hurricane investigation and FISA applications targeting Carter Page. Inspector General Michael E. Horowitz found that the FBI had adequate predication to open the Crossfire Hurricane investigation and found no documentary evidence that political bias influenced the decision to open the investigation. However, the report identified 17 "significant inaccuracies and omissions" in the four FISA applications used to surveil Page. Horowitz concluded that the Steele dossier "played a central and essential role" in the FBI's decision to seek the FISA order, with FBI and DOJ officials telling investigators the Steele reporting "pushed [the FISA proposal] over the line" in terms of establishing probable cause.

The report found that the FBI did not have corroborating information for the specific allegations against Page in Steele's reporting when it submitted the first FISA application or subsequent renewals. When the FBI interviewed Steele's primary sub-source in January 2017, the sub-source provided information that "raised significant questions about the reliability" of the Steele reporting, stating that Steele had "misstated or exaggerated" some of his statements. Despite this, the FBI did not share this information with the DOJ attorneys preparing the subsequent FISA renewal applications, and continued to seek and obtain renewals without disclosing these concerns to the FISA court.

Among the 17 errors, the report found that an FBI attorney had altered an email from the CIA to conceal that Page had previously served as a CIA source, making Page's contacts with Russian officials appear more suspicious than warranted. The FBI attorney, later identified as Kevin Clinesmith, was referred for criminal prosecution and subsequently pleaded guilty to making a false statement.

== Public statements and media ==
In October 2018, Steele broke his public silence, criticizing Trump and referencing "strange and troubling times."

In October 2021, Steele gave his first on-camera interview in an ABC News documentary aired on Hulu, maintaining that his sources were credible and confirming that one source had faced repercussions but was still alive.

In 2024, Steele published Unredacted: Russia, Trump, and the Fight for Democracy.

In February 2026, Steele told LBC "that it is 'quite likely' that Jeffrey Epstein had compromising information about Donald Trump, as he suggested that the paedophile financier was 'recruited by Russian organised criminals'".

In 2026, Steele took part in a TV series called The Wargame, hosted by Cathy Newman, in which members of the cast "reflect on the pressures of decision-making at the highest level and explore the wider questions raised from this thrilling documentary series".

== Personal life ==
Steele was first married to Laura Hunt in July 1990. They had three children; Hunt died in 2009 after a long illness. He remarried in 2012. He and his second wife Katherine have one child and are raising all four children together. He lives in Farnham, Surrey.

== See also ==
- Crossfire Hurricane (FBI investigation)
- Igor Danchenko
- Russian interference in the 2016 United States elections
