= Evgeny Buryakov =

Russian spy

- Евгений Евгеньевич Буряков
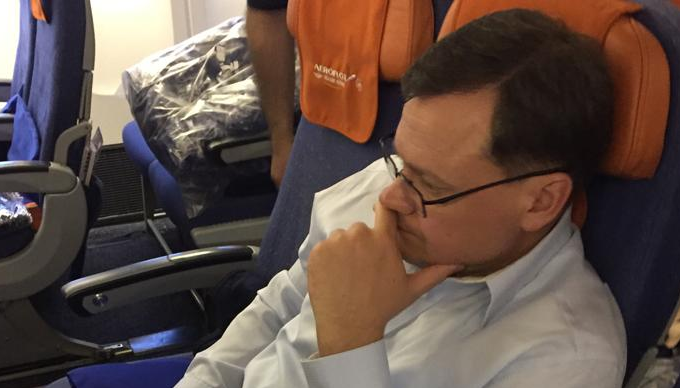
- Buryakov in 2017
- Born: Evgeny Evgenyevich Buryakov; March 2, 1975; Krasnodar Krai
- Other name: Zhenya
- Occupation: Deputy Representative of Vnesheconombank
- Known for: Espionage against the United States
- Spouse: Marina Buryakova
- Children: 1 son, 1 daughter
- Conviction: Conspiracy
- Criminal charges: Conspiracy
- Penalty: 30 months in prison

Evgeny Evgenievich Buryakov (Russian: Евгений Евгеньевич Буряков; born March 2, 1975) is a convicted Russian spy. He was arrested on January 26, 2015, charged with, and pleading guilty to, spying on the United States for the Russian Foreign Intelligence Service (SVR). Buryakov was a New York-based Deputy Representative of Vnesheconombank, Russia's state-owned national development bank. Buryakov operated with non-official cover, and was thus not entitled to diplomatic immunity. Buryakov conducted his espionage with the assistance of Igor Sporyshev, trade representative of the Russian Federation to New York, and Victor Podobnyy, an attaché to the Permanent Mission of the Russian Federation to the United Nations. In exchange for pleading guilty, Buryakov received a reduced sentence of 30 months in federal prison and fined $100,000. He was released early from prison on March 31, 2017, and deported from the United States six days later.

== Early life and family ==
Buryakov was born on March 2, 1975, in Krasnodar Krai, and previously worked at a tax office in Moscow before coming to America. His father, Yevgeny Petrovich Buryakov, is an engineer at the Russian Embassy in Tunis.

His wife, Marina, said they met in Kushchevskaya in 1994 in when she was in high school. They married in May 1999. They have one son and one daughter. After Buryakov's arrest in 2015, his mother, Tatiana, returned from Tunis to Moscow to help look after his children.

== Espionage ==
Prior to working in New York City, Buryakov worked in Pretoria under non-official cover from October 1, 2004, to April 30, 2009. Beginning around March 2012, in dozens of occasions at locations in and around Manhattan and the Bronx, Buryakov began meeting with Sporyshev and Podobnyy for the purpose of exchanging information related to their work as intelligence officers operating within the United States at the direction of the Russian SVR. They tasked Buryakov with attempting to recruit New York City residents as intelligence sources, as well as gathering information about U.S. sanctions on Russia and U.S. efforts to develop alternative energy resources. Buryakov worked for Directorate ER of the SVR, which is focused on economic intelligence. Buryakov also came up with questions for the Russian News Agency TASS to ask at the New York Stock Exchange regarding high-frequency trading, exchange-traded funds (ETFs) and automatic trading robots.

Beginning in 2013, an undercover agent of the Federal Bureau of Investigation (FBI), posing as an analyst for an energy firm, began providing Sporyshev with binders containing industry analyses and bugged with hidden microphones, allowing the FBI to record Sporyshev, Podobnyy, and other Russian intelligence personnel. The undercover agent met Buryakov at a Manhattan office, as well as at casinos in Atlantic City.

On April 3, 2017, Carter Page revealed to BuzzFeed that he is "Male-1" in the January 2015 indictments against Evgeny Buryakov, Viktor Podobnyy, and Igor Sporyshev and that Page had met with Podobnyy beginning in 2013. In January 2015, the three Russians were charged with overtly conspiring against the United States and that Buryakov had been an unregistered agent of a foreign government. In absentia, 40 year old Podobnyy and 27 year old Sporyshev were charged also with aiding and abetting Buryakov, but were not arrested because Podobnyy and Sporyshev, as officials of the Russian government, left the United States under diplomatic immunity. During the investigations of the three Russians, the United States government used recorded transcripts of their conversations. Later, during October 2016 when the FBI and the Justice Department officials obtained a 90-day warrant for electronic surveillance of Carter Page who had ceased being an adviser to Donald Trump's 2016 election campaign, the Foreign Intelligence Surveillance Act (FISA) application included Page's relationships with Buryakov, Podobnyy, and Sporyshev as part of the basis for obtaining the warrant.

== Conviction ==
Buryakov's defense, financed by Vnesheconombank, argued that he was protected from the charges by virtue of being an official employee of the Russian government, though this argument was rejected by Judge Richard M. Berman. Buryakov ultimately pleaded guilty to the charges against him, and was sentenced to 30 months in prison and a $100,000 fine. He served his sentence at the minimum-security Federal Correctional Institution in Elkton, Ohio. He was released early, on March 31, 2017, and deported back to Russia on April 5, 2017.

== See also ==
- Nunes memo
