= Nunes memo =

2018 memo alleging FBI misconduct

Nunes memo

The U.S. Justice Department warned that the public release of a classified memo alleging abuses in FBI surveillance tactics would be "extraordinarily reckless without giving the Department and the FBI the opportunity to review the memorandum".

The Nunes memo (formally titled Foreign Intelligence Surveillance Act Abuses at the Department of Justice and the Federal Bureau of Investigation) is a four-page memorandum written for U.S. Representative Devin Nunes by his staff and released to the public by the Republican-controlled House Intelligence Committee on February 2, 2018. The memo alleges that the Federal Bureau of Investigation (FBI) "may have relied on politically motivated or questionable sources" to obtain a Foreign Intelligence Surveillance Act (FISA) warrant in October 2016 and in three subsequent renewals on Trump adviser Carter Page in the early phases of the FBI's investigation into Russian interference in the 2016 United States elections.

Nunes was the chairman of the committee at the time and was a supporter of FISA surveillance extension. Former Trump campaign CEO and chief strategist Steve Bannon has described Nunes as Trump's second-strongest ally in Congress. In April 2017, Nunes stepped aside from chairing the House Intelligence Committee's Russia investigation while the House Ethics Committee conducted an inquiry into whether Nunes had violated applicable ethics rules with respect to his apparent secret coordination with White House officials. The Ethics Committee investigation ended in December 2017, after following consultation with experts, it determined that the information Rep. Devin Nunes shared was not classified.

Republican legislators who favored public release of the memo argued that the memo presents evidence that a group of politically biased FBI employees abused the FISA warrant process for the purpose of undermining the Donald Trump presidency. These congressmen alleged that there was excessive and improper dependence on the Steele dossier, which was funded in part by the Clinton campaign and Democratic National Committee, when the Justice Department applied to the FISA court to conduct electronic surveillance on former Trump campaign aide Carter Page. Political allies of Donald Trump attempted to use the memo to pivot attention away from the Special Counsel investigation of the Trump presidential campaign's role in Russian interference in the 2016 United States elections. Prior to release of the memo, news media reported that Trump told his associates that release of the memo would discredit the investigation.

A social media campaign, under the hashtag #ReleaseTheMemo, emerged in mid-January 2018 to publicly release the memo despite some of its classified contents. The Alliance for Securing Democracy's Hamilton 68 project reported that Russian-linked bots on Twitter helped spread the hashtag. Twitter stated it found no significant Russian activity connected to the hashtag. Trump approved release of the Republican document over the objections of the FBI and the U.S. Intelligence Community. The FBI issued a rare statement expressing "grave concerns" about factual omissions and the accuracy of the memo.

Inspector General Horowitz's December 2019 report identified 17 "significant errors or omissions" in the FBI's FISA applications, though it found no evidence that political bias motivated the investigation's opening. The Columbia Journalism Review characterized the IG report as having "confirmed" the memo's "allegations of abuse," while Lawfare assessed that the memo "turns out to have been correct on important points" regarding FISA errors, though its claim that the investigation was politically motivated was not substantiated.

Within Congress, anticipation of the release of the memo sparked controversy, mainly along political lines. House Republicans released the memo on February 2, 2018. Democrats on the House Intelligence Committee prepared a classified 10 page rebuttal of claims in the Nunes memo, which was initially blocked for release. After the Nunes memo was released to the public, the House Intelligence Committee voted unanimously to release the Democrats' memo. On February 9, Trump blocked release of the Democrats' memo, saying the committee should redact classified and sensitive material before releasing it to the public. A redacted version of the Democratic memo was ultimately released on February 24.

== Contents ==
The memo states that a FISA warrant on Carter Page was sought and obtained on October 21, 2016, and that there were three subsequent 90-day renewals. The memo notes that FISA submissions are classified information.

The memo "raise[s] concern as to the legitimacy and legality" of the FISA application process relating to Page, and that probable cause was not made in the warrant application. It makes five main points:

First, the memo stated that the Steele dossier "formed an essential part of the Carter Page FISA application"; the DOJ Inspector General Michael E. Horowitz later found that the dossier "played a central and essential role" in the decision to seek the surveillance warrant. The memo asserted that Christopher Steele was paid $160,000 by the Democratic National Committee and the Clinton campaign. The payments were made through intermediaries: Perkins Coie, which represented the DNC and Clinton campaign, paid Fusion GPS $1.02 million in fees and expenses, $168,000 of which Fusion GPS paid to Steele's firm Orbis to produce the dossier. In 2022, the Federal Election Commission fined the Clinton campaign $8,000 and the DNC $105,000 for misreporting these payments as "legal services" rather than opposition research.

The memo also alleged that information about the payment was not disclosed in the initial October 2016 FISA application or subsequent renewals. However, the FBI's application for a FISA warrant did describe, in a footnote, the origins and political background of the funders of the dossier, a fact conceded by Nunes and other Republican leaders on February 5, after the memo's release.

Second, the memo alleges that the FISA application relied "extensively" on a Yahoo! News report from September 2016 by Michael Isikoff, which referenced Page's July 2016 trip to Moscow and used information from Steele. It asserts that the article was "derived from information leaked by Steele himself to Yahoo News". Isikoff responded that the information he received from Steele was information the FBI already had. The Inspector General later found that the FBI told the FISA court it "did not believe" Steele was the source for the Yahoo article, based on the FBI's assurance that Steele was "a professional" who would not leak; however, Steele had in fact briefed Yahoo News at Fusion GPS's direction.

Third, the memo accuses Steele of being biased against the candidacy of Donald Trump, stating he was "desperate" and "passionate" that Trump would lose. It goes on to say Bruce Ohr knew about this bias and that it was not reflected in the FISA applications. Ohr was not assigned to counterintelligence matters and was not thought to have played a direct role in obtaining the warrants. The Inspector General later found that Ohr met with the Crossfire Hurricane team 13 times, passing information from Steele after the FBI had terminated Steele as a source, and referred Ohr's conduct to the Department's Office of Professional Responsibility.

Fourth, the memo quotes Bill Priestap saying that the corroboration efforts of the Steele dossier were in their "infancy" in October 2016 during the FISA application. The memo further alleges that Andrew McCabe testified that "no surveillance warrant would have been sought from the Foreign Intelligence Surveillance Court (FISC) without the Steele dossier information". Representative Eric Swalwell alleged the memo "misquoted" McCabe's testimony, which was given in private. The IG later concluded that the Steele dossier played "a central and essential role" in the FBI's decision to seek the FISA order.

The memo also confirms that the trigger that started the FBI investigation into potential collusion between Trump's campaign and the Russians was not the Steele dossier, but rather the comments made by Trump adviser George Papadopoulos, who told an Australian diplomat in May 2016 that the Russians possessed "dirt" on Hillary Clinton in the form of hacked emails. That confirmation contradicts earlier claims by some that the investigation had been triggered by the Steele dossier. The memo notes that Papadopoulos is mentioned in the Page FISA application, and says "there is no evidence of any cooperation or conspiracy between Page and Papadopoulos". It also says the FBI's Russia investigation was opened nearly three months before the FISA surveillance application in late July 2016 by Peter Strzok, who is accused of having "a clear bias against Trump and in favor of Clinton".

The memo also shows that the FISA warrant on Page was renewed three times. In each instance, the FBI had to show the signing judge that the warrant had merit. News accounts in 2017 indicated that because of the nature of his ties to Russia, Page had been under FBI scrutiny and had already been the subject of a FISA warrant in 2014, at least two years before the Trump campaign.

Finally, the memo asserts that former FBI Director James Comey testified to Congress that the Steele dossier was "salacious and unverified". However, Comey's prepared remarks show that he was referring specifically to "some personally sensitive aspects" of the dossier, not the entire dossier.

== Background ==
The memo was produced by a small group of House Republicans and staff, led by Devin Nunes, as part of an investigation into how the FBI used the Steele dossier. Democratic committee members were not informed about the investigation into the FBI or the preparation of the memo. Democrats alleged this violated committee Rule 9(a), which requires investigations be conducted "only if approved by the chair in consultation with the ranking minority member"; Nunes's spokesman stated the process was "absolutely procedurally sound and in accordance with House and committee rules".

Adam Schiff, the ranking member of the House Intelligence Committee, said "The chairman never bothered to go read these underlying materials. After months and months of making this argument that the FBI and DOJ are involved in some sort of conspiracy, he didn't even bother to read the materials himself." Nunes admitted he did not read the applications for surveillance warrants, explaining that under a DOJ agreement limiting review to one member, he delegated it to Rep. Trey Gowdy, a former federal prosecutor, who shared his notes with the committee.

Nunes had previously recused himself from the committee's investigation into Russia's interference in U.S. elections due to a House ethics investigation into Nunes' coordination with the Trump administration. The House Ethics Committee stated that "Nunes may have made unauthorized disclosures of classified information, in violation of House Rules, law, regulations, or other standards of conduct" (the Ethics Committee stated the investigation ended after classification experts in the intelligence community determined the information Nunes disclosed was not classified; three anonymous sources told The Atlantic the panel was unable to review the relevant classified information) However, after offering to step aside from the investigation into Russian interference, Nunes began what Fusion GPS characterized as a "parallel" investigation. Democrats alleged its purpose was to undermine the Russia investigation; Republicans said the goal was to investigate what they characterized as "FISA abuse" by the FBI and DOJ.

Since January 18, 2018, a growing number of Republicans began calling for the release of the memo.

Adam Schiff released a statement and a letter to Nunes on January 31, 2018, stating that Nunes had "made material changes to the memo he sent to White House – changes not approved by the Committee" and that the White House was "reviewing a document the Committee has not approved for release". In response Peter King, who also sits on the Intelligence Committee, stated, "My understanding is this was agreed on beforehand among Republicans. There's one small part in the memo which in no way affects the substance in the memo." He said it involved removing only "three or four words" and came at the request of the FBI.

=== Social media influence ===
A social media campaign under the hashtag "#ReleaseTheMemo" emerged on January 19, 2018, to publicly release the memo despite some of its classified contents.

Clint Watts, one of the founding researchers of ASD, said the social media campaign started trending after Julian Assange advocated for the memo's release, which was then repeated by Russian influence networks. Twitter stated that a "preliminary analysis of available geographical data for tweets with the hashtag #ReleaseTheMemo ... has not identified any significant activity connected to Russia with respect to tweets posting original content to this hashtag."

=== Historical background ===
Carter Page originally came to the attention of the FBI counterintelligence unit in 2013, prior to his becoming a Trump campaign adviser, when the unit learned that Russian spies were trying to use Page as a source of information and to recruit him as an agent; this resulted in Page being interviewed by the FBI in June 2013. Page claimed that the information he provided to the Russians was innocuous. News reports in August 2017, citing anonymous officials, indicated Page had been under FISA surveillance since 2014 related to his contacts with Russian intelligence officers. In March 2016, then-candidate Donald Trump listed the little-known Page as one of his foreign policy advisers.

Fusion GPS, the firm that later produced the Steele dossier, began research into Trump in October 2015 with funding from Paul Singer's conservative news outlet The Washington Free Beacon as part of the Never Trump movement. The outlet stopped funding this research in May 2016 when Trump became the presumptive nominee. Attorney Marc Elias then hired Fusion GPS on behalf of the Democratic National Committee and the Clinton campaign; Fusion GPS subsequently retained Christopher Steele, who produced the dossier. The Free Beacon stated that "none of the work product that the Free Beacon received appears in the Steele dossier."

In a May 2016 meeting in London, Trump foreign policy adviser George Papadopoulos told the Australian High Commissioner to the United Kingdom, Alexander Downer, that the Russians possessed "dirt" on Hillary Clinton in the form of hacked emails. Two months later, Australian officials passed this information to American officials. This began the inquiry into Trump's relationship to Russia.

In July 2016, Page traveled to Moscow for five days, delivering a public speech in which he criticized US policy as too antagonistic toward the Kremlin. Page had received permission from the Trump campaign to make the trip. On July 8, Page emailed Trump campaign officials about his presentation at the New Economic School in Moscow and described meeting Russian Deputy Prime Minister Arkady Dvorkovich. He said Dvorkovich "expressed strong support for Mr. Trump and a desire to work together toward devising better solutions in response to the vast range of current international problems". Page was later forced, under oath, to reveal he had met Dvorkovich during the visit.

The dossier alleged Page met Rosneft chairman Igor Sechin, and discussed the possible lifting of sanctions against Russia. In his congressional testimony, Page denied meeting with the Russians named in the dossier. He said he met Sechin's associate Andrey Baranov, but said "nothing that this gentleman said to me ever implied or asked for anything related to sanctions. Again, there may have been some general reference ... but no kind of negotiations in any format".

In September, after reports surfaced about Page's July trip to Russia, the Trump campaign said Page was not part of the campaign and never had been. Page then said he was taking a leave of absence.

A month later, in October 2016, and after Page left the campaign, the FBI sought a FISA warrant to investigate his connections to Russia. The warrant was granted by a FISA court judge and has since been renewed thrice, with each 90-day extension requiring new evidence "pertinent to intelligence-related collection" in order to back up the original application and to show that the warrant continues to be productive.

Shortly after the release of the memo, Time magazine reported that in 2013, Carter Page bragged about being an "informal adviser to the Kremlin" in a letter to the editor. Page was asked about this on February 6, 2018, on ABC's Good Morning America, where he described it as participation in "an informal group" that met in locations including the New York Stock Exchange. Page also claimed that he, despite being named foreign policy adviser, had never actually met Trump, contradicting his earlier statements in which he said he had been in a "number of meetings" with Trump and had "learned a tremendous amount from him".

=== Purpose ===
The memo argued that the FBI improperly obtained a FISA warrant on Carter Page by relying heavily on the Steele dossier without adequately disclosing to the FISA court that the dossier was funded by the Hillary Clinton presidential campaign and the Democratic National Committee. Republicans characterized this as evidence that politically biased FBI employees sought to undermine the Trump presidency.

== Responses ==
=== U.S. intelligence community ===
As expressed during our initial review, we have grave concerns about material omissions of fact that fundamentally impact the memo's accuracy.

— The FBI's statement on the Nunes memo, CNBC

Shortly after becoming a trending topic, the memo drew polarizing reactions from government officials and the media, and generally along party lines for lawmakers. The Justice Department (DOJ) released a letter to Congress calling a release of the memo without review "reckless" because it could expose intelligence sources and methods. FBI Director Christopher Wray was allowed to read the memo and did so on January 28. On January 29, the majority of the House Intelligence Committee disregarded the DOJ's warnings and voted to approve the memo's release. In response, Democrats on the House Intelligence Committee drafted a ten-page rebuttal memo on January 24. Both memos were released to the full House. The Republicans voted against making public the competing memo Democrats had crafted, and rejected a proposal to give the Justice Department and FBI more time to vet the document. The President then had up to five days to review it before it could be officially released.

Republicans sought a committee vote that would request the release through the President, which would keep the memo confined to committee members until the President responded. The memo could be made public by a vote in the House of Representatives if the President did not act or denied the request, but no vote was scheduled for the full House.

Nunes and the House Intelligence Committee denied access to the memo by the Senate Intelligence Committee and the FBI, which expressed a desire to investigate any alleged wrongdoing. The Department of Justice sent a letter to Nunes and called the release of the memo "extraordinarily reckless". Nunes' panel refused to allow the FBI and the Justice Department to view the memo despite their requests.

Adam Schiff, ranking member of the House Intelligence Committee, issued a statement saying it was "[r]ife with factual inaccuracies" and was "meant only to give Republican House members a distorted view of the FBI". Schiff also said the memo omits key information on evidence other than Steele's dossier, used in the application for the FISA warrant.

On July 21, 2018, the Justice Department released a heavily redacted version of the October 2016 FISA warrant application for Carter Page, which stated in part "The FBI believes that Page has been collaborating and conspiring with the Russian government" and "the FBI believes that the Russian government's efforts are being coordinated with Page and perhaps other individuals associated with Candidate #1's campaign."

On December 9, 2019, Inspector General Michael E. Horowitz released a report that did not find evidence of political bias during the investigation of Trump and Russia. However, in a Senate hearing, Horowitz stated he could not rule out political bias as a possible motivation.

Nor did the report find any evidence that the FBI attempted to place people inside the Trump campaign or report on the Trump campaign; but it did find numerous errors and omissions. According to the Columbia Journalism Review, the Inspector General's report "confirmed" the "allegations of abuse by Nunes".

=== Trump administration ===
On January 24, 2018, Trump expressed support for releasing the Nunes memo. He reportedly told close advisers that he believed the memo would reveal the FBI's bias against him, and provide grounds for him to fire Rod Rosenstein. White House Counsel Don McGahn wrote that "the memorandum reflects the judgments of its congressional authors" and that the reason for its release was "significant public interest in the memorandum". After its release, Trump claimed in a tweet that the memo "totally vindicates" him.

=== Republicans ===
Before the memo was released, House Speaker Paul Ryan warned his fellow Republicans against overplaying the contents of the memo and tying it to the Mueller investigation. After the memo was released, Ryan said, "The matter of concern outlined in this memo is a specific, legitimate one. Our FISA system is critical to keeping America safe from real and evolving threats. It is a unique system with broad discretion and a real impact on Americans' civil liberties." Ryan also supported the release of the Democrats' counter-memo.

Representative Trey Gowdy said the FISA application cited other material besides the dossier, but in his opinion the warrant would not have been authorized without the dossier.

=== Democrats ===
Democrats' rebuttal memo

Democratic leaders in Congress—House Minority Leader Nancy Pelosi and Senate Minority Leader Chuck Schumer—called upon House Speaker Paul Ryan to remove Nunes from the House Intelligence Committee, accusing him of abusing his position as committee chairman and of working in coordination with the White House that the committee is supposed to be investigating. Pelosi referred to the document as a "bogus" memo which was part of a Republican cover-up campaign; she also said Nunes had disgraced the House committee. Schumer said that the memo aimed to spread "conspiracy theories" and attacked federal law enforcement in order to protect Trump from investigation. Democratic House Whip Steny Hoyer also called for Nunes to be removed, saying Nunes' behavior had undermined the American people's trust in his chairmanship of the committee.

Jerry Nadler of New York, the ranking member of the House Judiciary Committee, issued a six-page analysis rebutting the memo's legal basis and accusing Republican House members of being part of "an organized effort to obstruct" Mueller's investigation. Nadler, who reviewed the classified material used to obtain the FISA warrant, called the memo "deliberately misleading and deeply wrong on the law". He argued the FISA Court had probable cause to believe Page was acting as "an agent of a foreign power".

Adam Schiff has stated that the "Nunes memo is designed to ... ["put the government on trial"] by furthering a conspiracy theory that a cabal of senior officials within the FBI and the Justice Department were so tainted by bias against President Donald Trump that they irredeemably poisoned the investigation."

==== Rebuttal memo ====
Democrats on the House Intelligence Committee drafted a classified ten-page rebuttal memo on January 24. However, when the committee voted along partisan lines to release the Nunes memo, it also voted not to release the Democratic memo. On February 5 the committee voted unanimously to release the Democrat's minority memo, subject to Trump's approval. On February 9, Trump declined to release the rebuttal memo, with the White House suggesting sensitive sections be removed before the memo is made public. McGahn stated this was because of its "numerous properly classified and especially sensitive passages". After redactions in consultation with the FBI, the Democratic memo, titled Correcting the Record -- The Russia Investigation, was released on February 24. This rebuttal memo has also been referred to as the Schiff memo after Adam Schiff.

=== Subsequent government evaluations ===
Subsequent government investigations produced mixed assessments of both memos. In December 2019, Inspector General Michael Horowitz found 17 "significant errors or omissions" in the FISA applications. Lawfare noted that the IG report "validated aspects of the Nunes memo and contradicted Schiff," while the Washington Post fact-check observed that the Democratic memo had asserted the FBI did not "omit material information," but the IG report found 17 significant errors or omissions. However, the IG did not find evidence that political bias motivated the investigation's opening or the decision to seek FISA warrants.

Lawfare characterized the overall assessments as "complicated": the Nunes memo "turns out to have been correct on important points" and the IG "sustained many of the specific facts Nunes asserted," but its "animating principle", that the FISA warrant was part of a politically motivated effort by the FBI to spy on Trump, was not substantiated. Conversely, Lawfare noted that the Schiff memo "turned out to be wrong on a lot of points," but on the central question of whether the warrants were politically motivated, Schiff was "arguing (using a lot of bad facts) for what still turns out to be the truth" that it was not so motivated.

Special Counsel Robert Mueller completed his investigation in March 2019 and was not fired; Deputy Attorney General Rod Rosenstein served until May 2019.

=== Criticism ===
Revelations about the Nunes memo and its surrounding controversy, including speculation about the potential firing of Mueller or Deputy Attorney General Rod Rosenstein, gave rise to comparisons to the Saturday night massacre, alluding to the firing of special prosecutor Archibald Cox by President Richard Nixon during the Watergate scandal.

Glenn Greenwald called the Republican-led campaign to release the memo "a bizarre spectacle" since the Republicans were "holding a document that only they can release, while pretending to be advocating for its release".

In response to the release of Nunes's document, former FBI director James Comey wrote:

That's it? Dishonest and misleading memo wrecked the House intel committee, destroyed trust with Intelligence Community, damaged relationship with FISA court, and inexcusably exposed classified investigation of an American citizen. For what?

In an interview on Meet the Press, former CIA director John O. Brennan said that Nunes had presented only "one side, in a very selective, cherry-picked memo". He said that for Nunes and the Republicans to deny the Democratic minority the ability to release their own memo "is just appalling, and it clearly underscores just how partisan Mr. Nunes has been". Brennan accused Nunes of an abuse of power in the use of his position on the House Intelligence Committee. "I don't say that lightly," he added.

Three former CIA analysts (Jeff Asher, Nada Bakos and Cindy Otis) wrote that the "politically motivated, recklessly drafted" Nunes memo "does not support its main thesis" alleging abuse by the FBI and Department of Justice regarding their investigation of Carter Page as it "doesn't offer any evidence of the potential abuse and, in fact, the memo undermines itself".

Senator Sheldon Whitehouse has accused the authors of the memo of "using selective declassification as a tactic—they use declassified information to tell their side, and then the rebuttal is classified". Jane Mayer stated that this leaves Christopher Steele's defenders no possibility "to respond without breaching national-security secrets".

Vox argued that by highlighting Deputy Attorney General Rod Rosenstein's approval of a FISA renewal application, the memo was "trying to imply Rosenstein has an anti-Trump bias".

Paul Rosenzweig, former Deputy Assistant Secretary for Policy at the Department of Homeland Security and former Whitewater investigator, has analyzed the Nunes memo and explained several reasons for why he believes "it makes no sense", is "not a serious effort at oversight", and "fails to make its case": the timing of the FISA warrant shows that any findings would first have come to light after the election and thus could not have affected it; Carter Page was no longer a member of the Trump campaign at the time of the application; it ignores that Page was under FISA surveillance as early as 2013 because of his proven Russian connections; the attempt to tie the October FISA application to Deputy Attorney General Rosenstein is flawed because Rosenstein was a U.S. attorney for the district of Maryland at the time and had nothing to do with that application; the memo "uses language that is intended to create a misimpression" by implying that the Steele dossier was central to the FISA application, when it was only a part of it; and that the memo "tries to bury" its "admission deep in the document", in the final paragraph, that the investigation into Russian interference in the 2016 United States elections was not triggered by the Steele dossier but by information from Trump advisor Papadopoulos.

== Release of Carter Page FISA warrant applications ==
Carter Page FISA warrant applications

On July 21, 2018, the Justice Department released heavily redacted versions of four FISA warrant applications for Carter Page.

The Nunes memo:

- The memo claimed the applications did not "disclose or reference the role of the DNC, Clinton campaign, or any party/campaign in funding Steele's efforts". The applications did not name these entities; a footnote stated that the person who hired Steele was "likely looking for information to discredit" the Trump campaign. Democrats argued this constituted adequate disclosure; Republicans maintained it was insufficient. In December 2019, Inspector General Michael Horowitz found 17 "significant errors or omissions" in the FISA applications, concluding they made "the information supporting probable cause...appear stronger than was actually the case".
- Faulted the application for not identifying Hillary Clinton or the DNC by name. However, the application showed the standard practice of omitting the names of American individuals and organizations. For example, Trump and Clinton were identified only as "Candidate #1" and "Candidate #2," respectively. While Hillary Clinton was identified as Candidate #2 in the application, it was not in reference to the dossier.
- Asserted the DOJ referenced a Yahoo News article as corroboration of Steele's information, even though it later became known that Steele had been a source for the article, an assertion rebutted by Democrats. However, the application actually cited the Yahoo News article only to show that Carter Page had denied allegations against him, under a section entitled "Page's Denial of Cooperation With the Russian Government."

The October 2016 warrant was the first FISA application targeting Page in the Russia investigation. Page had been the subject of a previous FISA warrant in 2014.

The day after the applications were released, Trump asserted that they confirmed the Justice Department and FBI had misled the FISA court and as a result his campaign had been illegally spied on to benefit the Clinton campaign. Trump also quoted notable writer Andrew McCarthy, who had called into question the integrity of the FISA court itself. Republican Senator Marco Rubio disagreed, stating: "I don't believe that them looking into Carter Page means they were spying on the campaign." Following the December 2019 Inspector General report, Rubio revised his assessment, stating in May 2020 that FBI agents "omitted exculpatory information, they lied to the court, they left things out, they in fact doctored and altered material to present to the court."

== See also ==
- Dismissal of James Comey
- Inspector General report on the Crossfire Hurricane investigation
- Links between Trump associates and Russian officials
- Trump Tower wiretapping allegations
