= Perjury trap =

Prosecutorial strategy in which a witness is coerced into lying under oath

In United States criminal law, a perjury trap is a form of prosecutorial strategy, which is sometimes claimed to be prosecutorial misconduct in which a prosecutor calls a witness to testify, typically before a grand jury, with the intent of coercing the witness into perjury (intentional deceit under oath). Courts on state and federal levels almost never recognize such as inappropriate to avoid in essence condoning perjury.

As an example, suppose that a person committed a crime for which they were never prosecuted, but the statute of limitations on that crime has expired. A prosecutor could set a perjury trap for them by calling them as a witness before a grand jury in a case about a different crime and ask them about the expired crime. If the witness lies about the expired crime, that would be perjury, and the new crime could then be prosecuted. Prosecution for perjury elicited in this manner violates due process of law since the investigatory powers of the grand jury are exploited to reach beyond their legal limits. It has been argued by legal scholars whether it constitutes a form of entrapment.

Claims of a perjury trap are common when perjury charges result from testimony before a grand jury but are rarely proven. No US federal court has ever accepted a motion to dismiss because of claimed perjury trap. The defense is extremely difficult because the question that elicited the perjured testimony must be immaterial to the case in which it was asked, and courts construe very broadly the questions that count as material to a case.
