= Links between Trump associates and Russian officials =

Links of associates of US President

Since Donald Trump was a 2016 candidate for president of the United States, multiple suspicious links between Trump associates and Russian officials were discovered by the FBI, a special counsel investigation, and several United States congressional committees, as part of their investigations into Russian interference in the 2016 United States elections. Following intelligence reports about the Russian interference, Trump and some of his campaign members, business partners, administration nominees, and family members were subjected to intense scrutiny to determine whether they had improper dealings during their contacts with Russian officials. Several people connected to the Trump campaign made false statements about those links and obstructed investigations. These investigations resulted in many criminal charges and indictments.

Starting in 2015, several allied foreign intelligence agencies began reporting secret contacts between Trump campaigners and known or suspected Russian agents in multiple European cities. In November 2016, Russian Deputy Foreign Minister Sergei Ryabkov contradicted Trump's denials by confirming the Trump campaign had been in contact with Russia, stating in a 2016 Interfax news agency interview: "Obviously, we know most of the people from his entourage," adding "I cannot say that all of them but quite a few have been staying in touch with Russian representatives."

The bipartisan Senate Intelligence Committee Russia report described how "secretive meetings and communications with Russian representatives... signaled that there was little intention by the incoming administration to punish Russia for the assistance it had just provided in its unprecedented attack on American democracy." Ultimately, Mueller's investigation "did not establish that members of the Trump campaign conspired or coordinated with the Russian government in its election interference activities".

== Overview ==
=== 1977–1987 alleged cultivation and recruitment of Trump by KGB ===
For many years, there has been intensive public scrutiny of Trump's ties to Russia. In a book excerpt published in Politico, former Guardian Russia correspondent Luke Harding stated that files declassified in 2016 indicated that Czech spies closely followed Trump and then-wife Ivana Trump in Manhattan and during trips to Czechoslovakia in the time after their marriage in 1977. Claims made by ex-KGB official Yuri Shvets were a basis of these allegations. Natalia and Irina Dubinin, daughters of then-Soviet ambassador Yuri Dubinin, are cited as indicating that a seemingly chance meeting of their father with Trump in the autumn of 1986 was part of Dubinin's assignment to establish contact with America's business elite and a determined effort by the Soviet government to cultivate Trump in particular.

This effort extended through a series of subsequent events, also documented in Donald Trump's ghost-written book The Art of the Deal, including a meeting in 1986 between the Ambassador and Trump at Trump Tower and Dubinin's subsequent invitation to Trump to visit Moscow (which was handled via KGB-affiliated Intourist and the future Russian Permanent Representative to the United Nations Vitaly Churkin). Harding also asserts that the "top level of the Soviet diplomatic service arranged his 1987 Moscow visit. With assistance from the KGB... The spy chief [Vladimir Kryuchkov] wanted KGB staff abroad to recruit more Americans." Harding cited Trump as writing in The Art that the trip included a tour of "a half dozen potential sites for a hotel, including several near Red Square" and that he "was impressed with the ambition of Soviet officials to make a deal".

In February 2025, The Hill reported on three cases where claims were made by ex-KGB officials that Trump had been cultivated, recruited (with the codename "Krasnov" (Note: "Krasnov")) in 1987, and/or compromised. The aforementioned claims by Shvets, which were also a significant basis for Craig Unger's best-selling book, American Kompromat: How the KGB Cultivated Donald Trump, and Related Tales of Sex, Greed, Power, and Treachery, were also backed by Alnur Mussayev, former head of Kazakhstan's intelligence service, and Sergei Zhyrnov, an ex-KGB officer living in France. Mussayev also asserted that Trump is compromised:

I have no doubt that Russia has kompromat on the US President, that over the course of many years the Kremlin has been promoting Trump to the post of President of the main world power.

=== Number of contacts by Trump associates with Russians ===
By April 19, 2019, The New York Times had documented that "Donald J. Trump and 18 of his associates had at least 140 contacts with Russian nationals and WikiLeaks, or their intermediaries, during the 2016 campaign and presidential transition."

The Moscow Project – an initiative of the Center for American Progress Action Fund – had, by June 3, 2019, documented "272 contacts between Trump's team and Russia-linked operatives ... including at least 38 meetings.... None of these contacts were ever reported to the proper authorities. Instead, the Trump team tried to cover up every single one of them."

=== 2015–2016 foreign surveillance of Russian targets ===
In late 2015, the British eavesdropping agency GCHQ, during the course of routine surveillance of "known Kremlin operatives already on the grid", used "electronic intelligence" to collect information from these Russian targets. They found that "Russians were talking to people associated with Trump...According to sources in the US and the UK, [the conversations] formed a suspicious pattern." The British passed this information about "suspicious 'interactions'" between "members of Donald Trump's campaign team" and "known or suspected Russian agents" to US intelligence agencies.

Over the next six months, European and Australian allies began to "pass along information about people close to Mr. Trump meeting with Russians in the Netherlands, Britain and other countries." Reports of these "contacts between Trump's inner circle and Russians" were shared by seven allied foreign intelligence agencies (reportedly those of the United Kingdom, Germany, Estonia, Poland, Australia, France, and the Netherlands). The New York Times also reported that British and Dutch agencies had evidence of meetings between "Russian officials – and others close to Russia's president, Vladimir V. Putin – and associates of President-elect Trump".

James Clapper confirmed that the following information was "accurate" and "also quite sensitive": "Over the spring of 2016, multiple European allies passed on additional information to the United States about contacts between the Trump campaign and Russians."

Later, U.S. intelligence overheard Russians, some of them within the Kremlin, discussing contacts with Trump associates, with some Russian officials arguing about how much to interfere in the election.

Then cyber attacks on state electoral systems led the Obama administration to directly accuse the Russians of interfering.

Because they are not allowed to surveil the private communications of American citizens without a warrant, the "FBI and the CIA were slow to appreciate the extensive nature of these contacts between Trump's team and Moscow."

=== 2016 campaign ===
During the 2016 campaign, Trump repeatedly praised Russian president Vladimir Putin as a strong leader. Peter Conradi, in GQ magazine, described this relationship as a "bromance".

Between 2013 and 2015, Trump stated "I do have a relationship with" Putin, "I met him once", and "I spoke indirectly and directly with President Putin, who could not have been nicer." From 2016, during his election campaign, his stance changed. During a press conference in July 2016, he claimed, "I never met Putin, I don't know who Putin is ... Never spoken to him", and in a July interview said, "I have no relationship with him."

In November 2016, Russian Deputy Foreign Minister Sergei Ryabkov told the Interfax news agency, "Obviously, we know most of the people from his entourage", and "I cannot say that all of them but quite a few have been staying in touch with Russian representatives."

=== 2017 ===
Several Trump advisers, including former National Security Advisor Michael Flynn and former campaign manager Paul Manafort, have been connected to Russian officials, or to Viktor Yanukovich and other pro-Russian Ukrainian officials.

The New York Times wrote on May 24, 2017, citing intelligence sources, that Russian agents were overheard during the campaign saying they could use Manafort and Flynn to influence Trump. Members of Trump's campaign, and later his White House staff, particularly Flynn and Jared Kushner, were in contact with Russian government officials both before and after the November election, including some contacts which they initially did not disclose.

==== Newspaper reports ====
The Wall Street Journal reported that United States intelligence agencies monitoring Russian espionage found Kremlin officials discussing Trump's associates in the spring of 2015. At the time, U.S. intelligence analysts were reportedly confused, but not alarmed, by these intercepted conversations. In July 2017, the conversations were re-examined in light of a recently disclosed Trump Tower meeting involving Donald Trump Jr. and Russian lawyer Natalia Veselnitskaya.

The New York Times reported that multiple Trump associates, including Manafort and other members of his campaign, had repeated contacts with senior Russian intelligence officials during 2016, although officials said that, so far, they did not have evidence that Trump's campaign had cooperated with the Russians to influence the election. Manafort said he did not knowingly meet any Russian intelligence officials.

==== Meetings with Kislyak ====
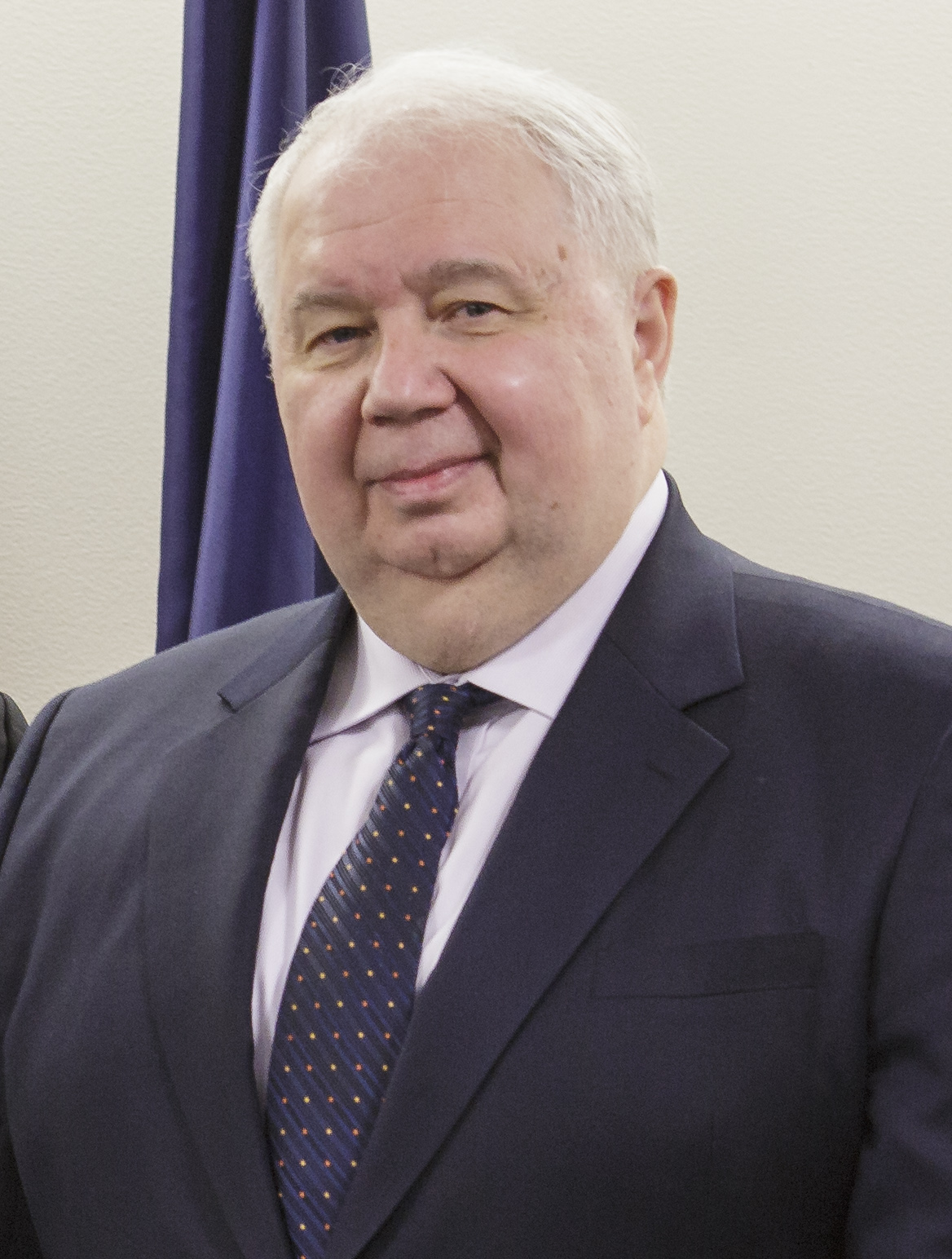
Russian diplomat Sergey Kislyak met with a number of U.S. officials.

After Senator Jeff Sessions, who was part of the Trump campaign, first denied he had any contact with Russians during the campaign, even though he had met with Russian ambassador Sergey Kislyak, and Michael Flynn, also a member of the campaign, lied twice about meetings with Kislyak, the media focused negative attention on Kislyak. National security experts "generally agree that Sessions and other Trump campaign officials have handled the Russia issue poorly. Sessions, they say, should have told Congress about his meeting with Kislyak. And they say Flynn was reckless and wrong to speak with Russian diplomats about sanctions during the transition period when Obama was still president."

Kremlin spokesman Dmitry Peskov told CNN that the "electoral process" was not discussed during these meetings, and that Kislyak had also met with "people working in think tanks advising Hillary or advising people working for Hillary" during the campaign.

In particular, Kislyak met with several Trump campaign members, transition team members, and administration nominees. Involved people dismissed those meetings as routine conversations in preparation for assuming the presidency. Trump's team has issued at least twenty denials concerning communications between his campaign and Russian officials; several of which later turned out to be false.

The Trump administration reportedly asked the FBI for help in countering the news reports about alleged contacts with Russia.

Former ambassadors Michael McFaul and John Beyrle said they were "extremely troubled" by the evidence of Russian interference in the U.S. election. Both supported an independent investigation into the matter, but dismissed as "preposterous" the allegations that Kislyak participated in it, particularly through his meetings with the Trump campaign: "Kislyak's job is to meet with government officials and campaign people," McFaul stated. "People should meet with the Russian Ambassador and it's wrong to criminalize that or discourage it."

==== December 2016 Trump Tower meeting ====
In March 2017, Trump's White House disclosed that Kushner, Kislyak, and Flynn had met at Trump Tower in December 2016. At that meeting, the Washington Post reported that Kushner requested that a direct, Russian-encrypted, communications back-channel be set up to allow secret communication with Russia and to circumvent safeguards in place by the United States intelligence community. Some sources told the Post that the purpose of such a link would have been to allow Flynn to speak directly to Russian military officials about Syria and other issues, while others pointed out that there would be no reason for such discussions to be concealed from appropriate US government officials. According to the sources, no such communications channel was actually set up.

After the meeting, Kislyak sent a report of the meeting to the Kremlin using what he thought were secure channels, but the report was intercepted by American intelligence. Kislyak was reportedly taken aback by the request and expressed concern about the security implications at stake in having an American use a secret communications back-channel between the Kremlin and diplomatic outposts.

==== March 2017 ====
In March 2017 former Acting CIA Director Michael Morell stated that he had seen no evidence of conspiracy between Trump and the Kremlin: "On the question of the Trump campaign conspiring with the Russians here, there is smoke, but there is no fire, at all."

In a March 2017 interview with Chuck Todd, James Clapper, who had been the Director of National Intelligence under President Obama until January 20, 2017, revealed the state of his knowledge at that time:

CHUCK TODD: Were there improper contacts between the Trump campaign and Russian officials?

JAMES CLAPPER: We did not include any evidence in our report, and I say, "our," that's N.S.A., F.B.I. and C.I.A., with my office, the Director of National Intelligence, that had anything, that had any reflection of collusion between members of the Trump campaign and the Russians. There was no evidence of that...

CHUCK TODD: I understand that. But does it exist?

JAMES CLAPPER: Not to my knowledge.

Todd pressed him to elaborate.

CHUCK TODD: If [evidence of collusion] existed, it would have been in this report?

JAMES CLAPPER: This could have unfolded or become available in the time since I left the government.

Clapper had stopped receiving briefings on January 20 and was "not aware of the counterintelligence investigation Director Comey first referred to during his testimony before the House Permanent Select Committee for Intelligence on the 20th of March". CNN stated that Clapper had "taken a major defense away from the White House."

=== 2017–2018 Trump DOJ investigations of opposition politicians ===
The New York Times reported in June 2021 that in 2017 and 2018 Trump's Justice Department subpoenaed metadata from the iCloud accounts of at least a dozen people associated with the House Intelligence Committee, including that of Democratic ranking member Adam Schiff and Eric Swalwell, and family members, to investigate leaks to the press about contacts between Trump associates and Russia. Records of the inquiry did not implicate anyone associated with the committee, but upon becoming attorney general William Barr revived the effort, including by appointing a federal prosecutor and about six others in February 2020. The Times reported that, apart from corruption investigations, subpoenaing communications information of members of Congress is nearly unheard-of, and that some in the Justice Department saw Barr's approach as politically motivated. Justice Department inspector general Michael Horowitz announced an inquiry into the matter the day after the Times report.

=== 2019 ===
After 22 months of investigation, Special Counsel Robert Mueller submitted his report to the Justice Department on March 22, 2019. The investigation "did not establish that members of the Trump campaign conspired or coordinated with the Russian government in its election interference activities".

Attorney General William Barr ordered the United States Department of Justice Office of the Inspector General under Michael E. Horowitz to investigate the FBI investigation of the 2016 Donald Trump campaign. The investigation was largely based on a May 2016 conversation between Trump campaign adviser George Papadopoulos and Australian diplomat Alexander Downer in London. Papadopolous reportedly said he heard that Russia had thousands of emails from Democratic nominee Hillary Clinton. The Inspector General released his report on December 9, 2019, concluding that the investigation was justified and done correctly, although some mistakes were made. Barr rejected key findings from the report, although he could not order Horowitz to alter his report because the inspector general operates independently from the department. President Trump called the report "a disgrace" and said he was waiting for the Durham special counsel investigation to produce a report. The investigation is being headed up by John Durham, the United States Attorney for the District of Connecticut.

=== 2020 ===
On August 17, 2020, Roger Stone dropped his appeal of seven felony convictions related to the House of Representatives investigation into ties between the Trump campaign and Russia. This came after Trump commuted Stone's 40-month prison term and $20,000 fine.

The United States Senate Select Committee on Intelligence released its final report on August 18, 2020. The report concluded that there were significant ties between the 2016 Trump presidential campaign and Russia. In particular, they noted that Paul Manafort had hired Konstantin V. Kilimnik, a "Russian intelligence officer," and that Kilimnik was possibly connected to the 2016 hack and leak operation. The investigation was led by Senator Richard Burr (R-NC) until Burr stepped aside for an unrelated investigation into allegedly illegal stock trades: Senator Marco Rubio (R-FL) then led the committee.

=== 2022 ===
On November 17, 2022, Republican political operative Jesse Benton was convicted by a federal jury for a 2016 scheme to funnel Russian money to the Donald Trump campaign. According to court documents, Benton caused a Russian foreign national to wire $100,000 to his consulting firm, of which $25,000 of the money from the Russian national was contributed to the Trump campaign. Benton had been pardoned by President Trump on December 23, 2020.

=== 2023 ===
In March 2023, The Guardian reported that since October 2022, prosecutors in the US Attorney for the Southern District of New York were investigating alleged Russian financial ties to Trump Media & Technology Group. In December 2021, two loans totaling $8 million were paid to Trump Media from obscure Putin-connected entities as the company was "on the brink of collapse". $2 million was paid by Paxum Bank, part-owned by Anton Postolnikov, a relation of Aleksandr Smirnov, a former Russian government official who now runs the Russian shipping company Rosmorport. $6 million was paid by an ostensibly separate entity, ES Family Trust, whose director was the director of Paxum Bank at the same time.

== Trump administration members ==
=== Michael Flynn ===
Flynn statement of offense

In December 2015, Michael Flynn was paid $45,000 by Russia Today, a Kremlin-supported television channel, for delivering a talk in Moscow, and Russia provided him a three-day, all-expenses-paid trip. As a retired military intelligence officer, Flynn was required to obtain prior permission from the Defense Department and the State Department before receiving any money from foreign governments; Flynn apparently did not seek that approval before the RT speech. Two months later, in February 2016 when he was applying for renewal of his security clearance, he stated he had received no income from foreign companies and had only "insubstantial contact" with foreign nationals. Glenn A. Fine, the acting Defense Department Inspector General, confirmed he was investigating Flynn.

On November 10, 2016, President Obama warned President-elect Trump against hiring Flynn. Trump appointed Flynn as National Security Advisor on November 18, 2016, but Flynn was forced to resign on February 13, 2017, after it was revealed that on December 29, 2016, the day Obama announced sanctions against Russia, Flynn discussed the sanctions by phone with Russian ambassador Sergey Kislyak. Flynn had earlier acknowledged speaking to Kislyak but denied discussing the sanctions.

On March 2, 2017, The New York Times reported that Flynn and Kushner met with Kislyak in December 2016 to establish a secret back-channel line of communication between the Trump administration and the Russian government. In May 2017, it was further reported that at that December meeting, Kushner and Flynn asked the Russians to set up a direct, encrypted communications back-channel with Moscow, so that Flynn could speak directly to Russian military officials about Syria and other matters without the knowledge of American intelligence agencies. Kislyak was hesitant to allow Americans access to Russia's secure communications network, and no such secret back-channel was actually set up.

On May 31, 2017, the House Intelligence Committee served Flynn with subpoenas for testimony and production of personal documents and business records. On September 13, The Wall Street Journal reported that Flynn promoted a Russian-backed, multibillion-dollar Middle Eastern nuclear plant project while working in the White House. The project involved building 40 nuclear reactors across the Middle East, with security provided by Rosoboron, a Russian state-owned arms exporter that is under American sanctions. On September 15, BuzzFeed reported that Flynn, Kushner, and Bannon secretly met with King Abdullah II of Jordan on January 5, 2017, to press for the nuclear power plant project.

On December 1, 2017, Flynn pleaded guilty to lying to the FBI and was later pardoned by Trump.

=== Jared Kushner ===
The special counsel investigated Kushner's finances, business activities, and meetings with Russian banker Sergey Gorkov and Russian ambassador Sergey Kislyak.

In April 2017, it was reported that Donald Trump's son-in-law and senior advisor, Jared Kushner, on his application for top secret security clearance, failed to disclose numerous meetings with foreign officials, including Sergey Kislyak and Sergey Gorkov, the head of the Russian state-owned bank Vnesheconombank. Kushner's lawyers called the omissions "an error". Vnesheconombank said the meeting was business-related, in connection with Kushner's management of Kushner Companies. The Trump administration said it was a diplomatic meeting.

According to U.S. officials, investigators believe that Kushner has important information regarding the FBI investigation. In mid-December 2016, when Trump "was openly feuding with American intelligence agencies", Kushner met for thirty minutes with Russian banker Sergey N. Gorkov, "whose financial institution was deeply intertwined with Russian intelligence" and is "under sanction by the United States". By late May 2017, the meeting had "come under increasing scrutiny" by the Senate Intelligence Committee, as "current and former American officials" said "it may have been part of an effort by Mr. Kushner to establish a direct line to Mr. Putin outside established diplomatic channels."

=== Wilbur Ross ===
As reported in the Paradise Papers, Secretary of Commerce Wilbur Ross has shares in Navigator, a publicly traded shipping company that has contracts with Russian gas company Sibur, held in off-shore accounts. Co-owners of Sibur have ties to Vladimir Putin and are under U.S. sanctions.

=== Anthony Scaramucci ===
In July 2017, Anthony Scaramucci, a Trump campaign member who was appointed White House Communications Director, was involved in discussions about joint investments between his firm and a sanctioned Russian government fund. Scaramucci met with Kirill Dmitriev, head of the Russian Direct Investment Fund, a $10 billion state investment firm under U.S. government sanctions. Scaramucci confirmed the meeting took place, saying he had "long known" Dmitriev, and criticized American sanctions as ineffective. In June 2017, CNN published a story about an alleged congressional investigation into Scaramucci's relationship with the fund. The story was quickly retracted as "not solid enough to publish as-is", and resulted in the resignation of three CNN employees.

=== Jeff Sessions ===
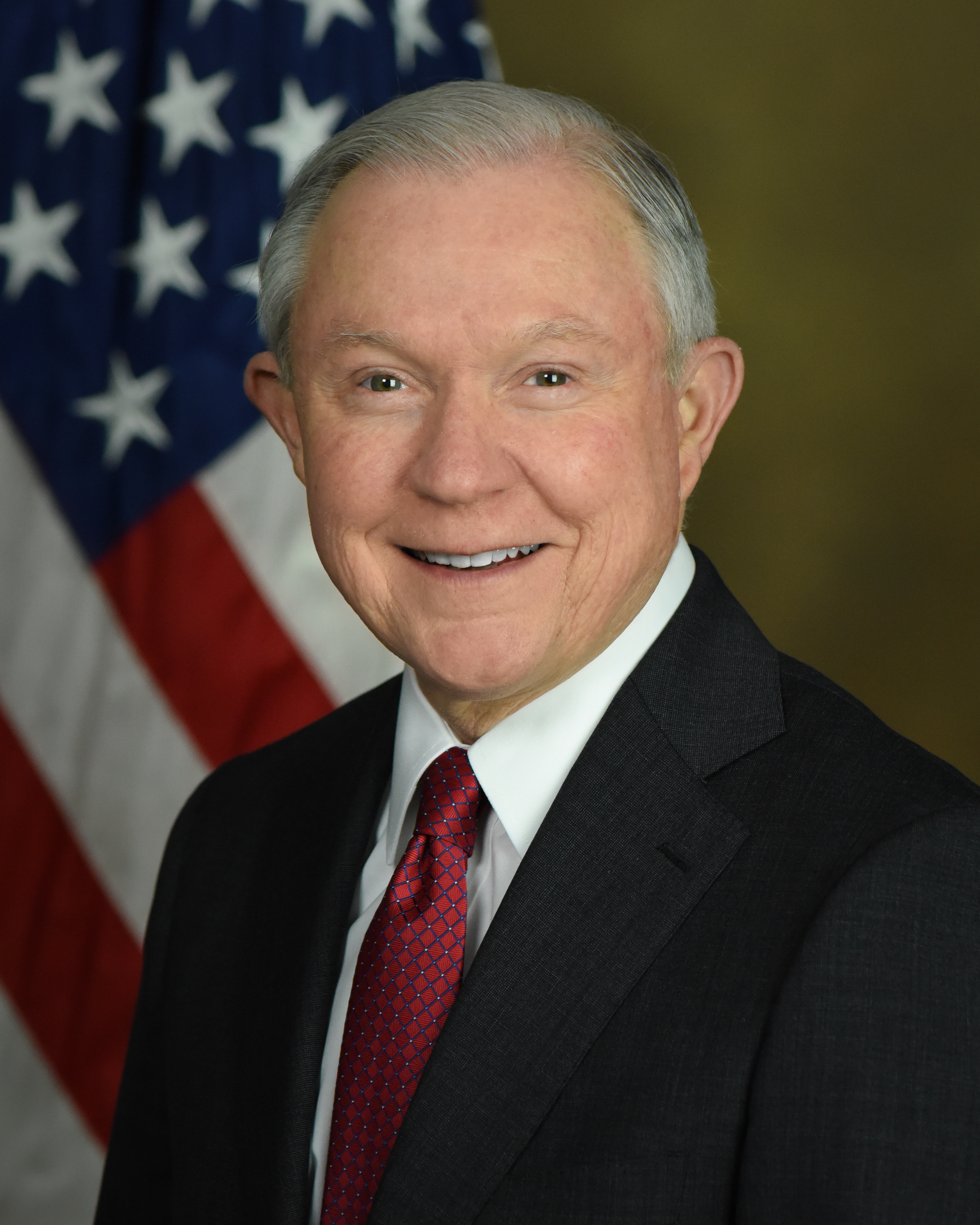
Attorney General Jeff Sessions

In March 2017, it was revealed that while still a U.S. Senator, Attorney General Jeff Sessions, an early and prominent supporter of Trump's campaign, spoke twice with Russian ambassador Kislyak before the election – once in July 2016 and once in September 2016. At his January 10 confirmation hearing to become attorney general, he stated he was not aware of any contacts between the Trump campaign and the Russian government, adding that he "did not have communications with the Russians." On March 1, 2017, he stated his answer had not been misleading, clarifying that he had "never met with any Russian officials to discuss issues of the campaign." On March 2, 2017, after meeting with senior career officials at the Justice Department, Sessions announced that he would recuse himself from any investigations into Russia's interference in the 2016 presidential election. In such investigations, Deputy Attorney General Rod Rosenstein has served as the Acting Attorney General. On January 23, 2018, The New York Times reported that Sessions had been interviewed by Mueller's team the previous week.

=== Rex Tillerson ===
Former ExxonMobil CEO Rex Tillerson, who was appointed Secretary of State by President Trump, had close ties to Russia and Vladimir Putin. He managed the Russia account of ExxonMobil, and was appointed Exxon CEO in 2006 largely on the strength of his Russian relationships. In 2011, Tillerson struck a major deal with Russia and its state-owned oil company Rosneft, giving ExxonMobil access to oil resources in the Russian Arctic. In recognition, Tillerson was awarded the Russian Order of Friendship, Russia's highest decoration for foreign citizens. Tillerson has known Putin since his work in Russia during the 1990s, and according to John Hamre, "he has had more interactive time with Vladimir Putin than probably any other American with the exception of Henry Kissinger".

== Trump campaign members ==
=== Michael R. Caputo ===
Republican public relations and media consultant Michael R. Caputo worked for Gazprom in Russia, and later as an adviser on the Trump campaign. Caputo lived in Russia from 1994 to 2000, employed by Gazprom-Media, and at the end of that period he contracted with Gazprom to do public relations work oriented toward raising Vladimir Putin's support level in the U.S. He returned to the U.S. where his former mentor Roger Stone convinced him to move to Miami Beach, Florida; there Caputo founded a media advising company. Caputo moved back to Europe in 2007 while advising a politician's campaign for parliament in Ukraine. Caputo worked as the campaign manager for Carl Paladino's 2010 run for Governor of New York state. Caputo was put in charge of the Trump campaign's communications for the New York state Republican primary from approximately November 2015 to April 2016, then left the campaign in the summer of 2016. In an inquiry by the House Intelligence Committee as part of their investigation into Russian interference in the 2016 U.S. presidential election, Caputo denied having ties to the Russian government while working on the Trump campaign. On June 18, 2018, Caputo admitted in a CNN interview that he told the Mueller investigation about his contacts with Henry Greenberg, a Russian claiming to have information about Hillary Clinton, in contrast to what he told the House Intelligence Committee in 2017. Caputo has since modified his testimony to the now closed House Intelligence Committee investigation to reflect his contact with Henry Greenberg.

=== Paul Manafort ===
Grand jury indictment against Paul J. Manafort Jr. and Richard W. Gates III, unsealed October 30, 2017

On February 14, 2017, The New York Times reported that Paul Manafort had repeated contacts with senior Russian intelligence officials during 2016. Manafort said he did not knowingly meet any Russian intelligence officials. Intercepted communications during the campaign show that Russian officials believed they could use Manafort to influence Trump. On June 2, 2017, special counsel Robert Mueller assumed the criminal probe into Manafort, which predated the 2016 election and the counterintelligence probe that in July 2016 began investigating possible collusion between Moscow and associates of Trump. Manafort was forced to resign as Trump campaign chairman in August 2016 amid questions over his business dealings in Ukraine years earlier. On September 18, 2017, CNN reported that the FBI wiretapped Manafort from 2014 until an unspecified date in 2016 and again from the fall of 2016 until early 2017, pursuant to two separate Foreign Intelligence Surveillance Act (FISA) court orders. It has not been confirmed that Trump's conversations with Manafort were intercepted as part of this surveillance. CNN also confirmed that "Mueller's team ... has been provided details of these communications."

In October 2017, Manafort was indicted by a federal grand jury and arrested on twelve criminal charges including conspiracy, money laundering, failure to register as an agent of a foreign power, and false statements. The charges arose from his consulting work for a pro-Russian government in Ukraine and are unrelated to the Trump campaign. Manafort pleaded not guilty and was placed under house arrest. On February 22, 2018, Manafort was indicted on 32 federal charges including tax evasion, money laundering and fraud relating to their foreign lobbying before, during and after the 2016 campaign. The following day, after Rick Gates pleaded guilty to some charges, he was indicted on two additional charges relating to pro-Russian lobbying in the United States.

On September 14, Manafort entered a plea deal with prosecutors, pleading guilty to a charge of conspiracy against the United States and a charge of conspiracy to obstruct justice, while also agreeing to co-operate with the Special Counsel investigation. Mueller's office stated in a November 26, 2018, court filing that while supposedly co-operating Manafort had repeatedly lied about a variety of matters, breaching the terms of his plea agreement. On December 7, 2018, the special counsel's office filed a document with the court listing five areas in which they say Manafort lied to them. In January 2019, Manafort's lawyers submitted a filing to the court in response to this accusation. Through an error in redacting, the document accidentally revealed that while he was campaign chairman, Manafort met with Konstantin Kilimnik, who is believed to be linked to Russian intelligence. The filing says Manafort gave him polling data related to the 2016 campaign and discussed a Ukrainian peace plan with him.

In December 2020, President Trump pardoned Manafort for all convictions (bank and tax fraud, illegal foreign lobbying and witness tampering).

=== Rick Gates ===
Rick Gates, a longtime business partner and protégé of Paul Manafort, was a senior member of the Trump campaign. He continued to work for Trump after Manafort's resignation and Trump's election as president, but in April 2017 was forced to resign from a pro-Trump lobbying group "amid new questions about Russian interference in the 2016 election". Records reviewed by The New York Times showed that Gates held meetings in Moscow with associates of Russian oligarch Oleg Deripaska, and "His name appears on documents linked to shell companies that Mr. Manafort's firm set up in Cyprus to receive payments from politicians and businesspeople in Eastern Europe." Gates worked with Manafort to promote Viktor Yanukovych and pro-Russian factions in Ukraine. Deripaska was the biggest investor in Davis Manafort, a lobbying and investment firm that employed Gates.

In October 2017, Gates was indicted by a federal grand jury and arrested on twelve criminal charges including conspiracy, money laundering, failure to register as an agent of a foreign power, and false statements. The charges arose from his consulting work for the pro-Russian government in Ukraine and are unrelated to the Trump campaign. Gates pleaded not guilty and was placed under house arrest. On February 22, 2018, Gates was indicted on 38 federal charges including tax evasion, money laundering and fraud relating to their foreign lobbying before, during and after the 2016 campaign. The following day, Gates pleaded guilty to making false statements to the FBI and conspiracy to defraud the United States and agreed to cooperate with Mueller's investigation. The second set of indictments were to stand pending Gates' cooperation and assistance in the Mueller investigation.

=== Carter Page ===
In a March 2016 interview, Trump identified Carter Page, who had previously been an investment banker in Moscow, as a foreign policy adviser in his campaign. Page became a foreign policy adviser to Trump in the summer of 2016. During the investigation into Russian interference in the 2016 U.S. elections, Page's past contacts with Russians came to public attention. In 2013, Page met with Viktor Podobnyy, then a junior attaché at the Permanent Mission of the Russian Federation to the United Nations, at an energy conference, and provided him with documents on the U.S. energy industry. Page later said he provided only "basic immaterial information and publicly available research documents" to Podobnyy. Podobnyy was later one of a group of three Russian men charged by U.S. authorities for participation in a Russian spy ring. Podobnyy and one of the other men were protected by diplomatic immunity from prosecution; a third man, who was spying for Russia under non-diplomatic cover, pleaded guilty to conspiring to act as an unregistered foreign agent and was sentenced to prison. The men had attempted to recruit Page to work for the SVR, a Russian intelligence service. The FBI interviewed Page in 2013 as part of an investigation into the spy ring, but decided that he had not known the man was a spy, and never accused Page of wrongdoing. Page has been the subject of four Foreign Intelligence Surveillance Act (FISA) warrants, the first in 2014, at least two years earlier than was indicated in the stories concerning his role in the 2016 presidential campaign of Donald Trump. 2017 news accounts about the warrant indicated it was granted because of Page's ties to Buryakov, Podobnyy, and the third Russian who attempted to recruit him, Igor Sporyshev.

Page was dropped from the Trump team after reports that he was under investigation by federal authorities. The FBI and the Justice Department obtained a FISA warrant to monitor Page's communications during October 2016, after they made the case that there was probable cause to think Page was acting as an agent of a foreign power. Page told The Washington Post that he considered that to be "unjustified, politically motivated government surveillance." According to the Nunes memo, the 90-day warrant was renewed three times.

In February 2017, Page stated he had no meetings with Russian officials during 2016, but two days later did not deny meeting with Russian Ambassador Sergey Kislyak during the 2016 Republican National Convention in Cleveland. Page's revised account occurred after news reports revealed that Attorney General Jeff Sessions had likewise met with Kislyak. In March 2017, Page was called on by the Senate Intelligence Committee investigating links between the Trump campaign and Russian government. On March 9, 2017, Hope Hicks, a Trump spokesperson, distanced the campaign from Page, stating that Page was an "informal foreign policy adviser" who did "not speak for Mr. Trump or the campaign."

In September 2017, Page filed a defamation lawsuit against the media company Oath Inc. for its outlets' reporting of his alleged meetings with Russian officials. The suit was dismissed in March 2018 for lacking factual accusations of defamation. On February 11, 2021, Page lost a defamation suit he had filed against Yahoo! News and HuffPost for their articles which described his activities mentioned in the Steele dossier. The judge said that Page admitted the articles about his potential contacts with Russian officials were essentially true.

In January 2021, an FBI lawyer, Kevin Clinesmith, was sentenced to probation for "making a false statement" by intentionally altering an internal FBI email in connection with a FISA request to continue government surveillance on former Trump campaign official Carter Page in 2016 and 2017.

=== George Papadopoulos ===
George Papadopolous, of Chicago, Illinois, pleaded guilty on October 5, 2017, to making false statements to FBI agents, in violation of 18 U.S.C. 1001. The case was unsealed on October 30, 2017.

In March 2016, George Papadopoulos, a foreign policy adviser on the Trump campaign, sent an email to seven campaign officials with the subject line "Meeting with Russian Leadership – Including Putin", offering to set up "a meeting between us and the Russian leadership to discuss US-Russia ties under President Trump". Trump campaign advisers Sam Clovis and Charles Kubic objected to this proposed meeting. In May 2016, Ivan Timofeev, an official for the Russian International Affairs Council, emailed Papadopoulos about setting up a meeting with Trump and Russian officials in Moscow. Papadopoulos forwarded the email to Paul Manafort, who responded, "We need someone to communicate that [Trump] is not doing these trips."

Papadopoulos was arrested in July 2017 and subsequently cooperated with Special Counsel Robert Mueller's investigation. In October 2017 he pleaded guilty to a single charge of making a false statement to FBI investigators. The guilty plea was part of a plea bargain in which he agreed to cooperate with the government and "provide information regarding any and all matters as to which the Government deems relevant."

Following this, on September 7, 2018, Papadopoulos was sentenced to 14 days in prison, 12 months supervised release, 200 hours of community service and was fined $9,500. He was later pardoned by Trump in December 2020.

=== Roger Stone ===
Roger Stone, a former adviser to Donald Trump and self-proclaimed political "dirty trickster", said in March 2017 that during August 2016, he had been in contact with Guccifer 2.0, a hacker persona who publicly claimed responsibility for at least one hack of the DNC, believed to be operated by Russian intelligence. In a 2019 filing, prosecutors claimed Stone communicated with Wikileaks, and sought details about the scope of information stolen from the Democratic Party. Just prior to the election, the Clinton campaign accused Stone of having prior knowledge of the hacks, after he wrote, "Trust me, it will soon [sic] the Podesta's time in the barrel" on Twitter shortly before Wikileaks released the Podesta emails. Stone claimed he was actually referring to reports of the Podesta Group's own ties to Russia. In his opening statement before the United States House Permanent Select Committee on Intelligence on September 26, 2017, Stone reiterated this explanation: "Note that my tweet of August 21, 2016, makes no mention whatsoever of Mr. Podesta's email, but does accurately predict that the Podesta brothers' business activities in Russia ... would come under public scrutiny." Stone has reportedly stated privately to some Republican colleagues that he has communicated with Julian Assange on at least one occasion, although Stone and his two attorneys have since denied this. Instead, Stone has "clarified ... that the two have a mutual journalist friend", who Stone ultimately named as Randy Credico.

On January 25, 2019, Stone was arrested at his Fort Lauderdale, Florida, home in connection with Robert Mueller's Special Counsel investigation and charged in an indictment with witness tampering, obstructing an official proceeding, and five counts of making false statements. He pleaded not guilty and denied wrongdoing in press interviews. Stone was convicted on all seven counts on November 15, 2019, and sentenced to 40 months in prison.

Before Stone's sentence began, President Trump first commuted the sentence and then pardoned Stone, December 23, 2020.

=== Donald Trump Jr. ===
In May 2016, Donald Trump Jr. met with Aleksandr Torshin and Maria Butina at a National Rifle Association of America-sponsored dinner. Both Torshin and Butina worked to broker a secret meeting between then-candidate Trump and Russian president Putin.

On June 9, 2016, Donald Trump Jr., Jared Kushner and Paul Manafort had a meeting with Russian lawyer Natalia Veselnitskaya after being promised information about Hillary Clinton. Trump Jr. told The New York Times the meeting was about the Magnitsky Act. In emails proposing the meeting, publicist Rob Goldstone did not mention the Magnitsky Act and instead promised "documents and information that would incriminate Hillary" as "part of Russia and its government's support for Mr. Trump", to which Donald Trump Jr. responded, "if it's what you say I love it."

On October 9, 2017, CNN reported that Scott S. Balber, formerly a lawyer for Donald Trump and now the billionaire Aras Agalarov's lawyer, obtained a memo from Veselnitskaya which showed that her focus at the meeting was repealing the Magnitsky Act sanctions, "not providing damaging information on Clinton". Subsequently, Foreign Policy published the full memo she took to the meeting.

=== Elon Musk ===
Elon Musk was the largest donor of the Donald Trump 2024 presidential campaign. Since 2025, he has been a senior advisor to the United States president and the de facto head of the Department of Government Efficiency (DOGE) until July 4 2026. According to former FBI agent Johnathan Buma, Elon Musk and Peter Thiel have been targets of Russian intelligence. Buma notes that, while Thiel cooperated with the FBI to identify the foreign espionage network, the Russians were able to take advantage of Musk's proclivities for drugs and women to approach Musk, and that Musk had repeated direct contacts with Putin. Multiple sources of The Wall Street Journal also confirmed that there were regular phone calls between Musk and "high-level Russians," including Putin. According to political scientist Ian Bremmer, Musk had told him he had spoken with Putin and Kremlin officials about Ukraine.

== Trump business partners ==
=== Michael Cohen ===
On May 30, 2017, as inquiries into alleged Russian meddling in the U.S. election expanded, both the House and Senate congressional panels asked President Donald Trump's personal lawyer Michael Cohen, who was one of Trump's closest confidants, to provide information and testimony about any communications he had with people connected to the Kremlin.

On May 31, 2017, the House Intelligence Committee subpoenaed Cohen to testify and produce personal documents and business records.

The FBI investigated Cohen receiving funds in a shell company account from a firm connected to Russian oligarch Viktor Vekselberg.

== Trump supporters ==
=== Nigel Farage ===
On June 1, 2017, The Guardian reported that Nigel Farage, former leader of the United Kingdom Independence Party and one of the first non-American political figures to meet Trump following the election, was a person of interest in the FBI investigation, which Farage denied. Farage had previously met the Russian Ambassador to the United Kingdom Alexander Yakovenko, Roger Stone and Julian Assange, and The Guardian's source was quoted as saying, "If you triangulate Russia, WikiLeaks, Assange and Trump associates, the person who comes up with the most hits is Nigel Farage".

=== Andrei Nikolaev ===
Andrei Nikolaev, son of Russian billionaire businessman Konstantin Nikolaev who financially supported foreign agent Maria Butina from 2012 to 2014, worked at the Trump Campaign headquarters and was in the Washington, D.C. Trump International Hotel during Trump's inauguration in January 2017.

=== Erik Prince ===
On April 3, 2017, The Washington Post reported that around January 11, 2017, nine days before Donald Trump's inauguration, Erik Prince, founder of the Blackwater security company, secretly met with an unidentified Russian who was close to Vladimir Putin, in the Seychelles. The Trump administration said it was "not aware of any meetings" and said that Prince was not involved in the Trump transition. According to U.S., European, and Arab officials, the meeting was arranged by the United Arab Emirates and the purpose was to establish a back-channel link between Trump and Putin. The UAE and Trump's associates reportedly tried to convince Russia to limit its support to Iran and Syria. Prince also appeared to have close ties to Trump's chief strategist, Stephen Bannon. The Seychelles meeting took place after previous meetings in New York between Trump associates and officials from Russia and the Emirates, while official contacts between the Trump administration and Russian agents were coming under close scrutiny from the press and the U.S. intelligence community. U.S. officials said the FBI is investigating the Seychelles meeting; the FBI refused to comment.

Two intelligence officials confirmed to NBC News that the Seychelles meeting took place. One of them corroborated The Washington Post's account, but said it is not clear whether the initiative to arrange a meeting came from the UAE or Trump's associates and that no Trump transition people were directly involved. A second official said that the meeting was about "Middle East policy, to cover Yemen, Syria, Iraq and Iran", not Russia.

Prince's spokesperson said, "Erik had no role on the transition team, this is a complete fabrication. The meeting had nothing to do with President Trump. Why is the so-called under-resourced intelligence community messing around with surveillance of American citizens when they should be hunting terrorists?" A senior Trump administration official called the story of a Trump-Putin back-channel "ridiculous", and White House Press Secretary Sean Spicer said "We are not aware of any meetings and Erik Prince had no role in the transition."

The New York Times reported on May 19, 2018, that Donald Trump Jr. met with intermediary George Nader, Erik Prince, and Joel Zamel in Trump Tower on August 3, 2016. Nader reportedly told Trump Jr. the crown princes of Saudi Arabia and the UAE were eager to help his father win the election, and Zamel pitched a social media manipulation campaign. Trump Jr. reportedly responded favorably and Nader subsequently had frequent meetings with Steve Bannon, Michael Flynn and Jared Kushner. The Times reported that Prince had arranged the August 2016 meeting; Prince had stated in his November 30, 2017, testimony to the House Intelligence Committee that he had no formal communications or contact, nor any unofficial role, with the Trump campaign.

== FBI and congressional Intelligence Committee investigations ==
FBI investigations began in late July 2016. In May 2017, former FBI Director Robert Mueller was appointed as a special counsel in an expansion of the FBI's investigation. The Senate Intelligence Committee and the House Intelligence Committee also conducted inquiries.

The Senate Intelligence Committee described its concerns with secret meetings:

Finally, the Committee's bipartisan Report shows that almost immediately following Election Day in 2016, the Trump transition responded to Russia's election interference not by supporting punitive action, but rather by holding a series of secretive meetings and communications with Russian representatives that served to undercut the outgoing administration's efforts to hold Russia accountable. The transition's openness to this private Russian outreach prior to taking office, so soon after Russia's interference on Trump's behalf, combined with Trump publicly questioning Russia's involvement, signaled that there was little intention by the incoming administration to punish Russia for the assistance it had just provided in its unprecedented attack on American democracy."

The House Intelligence Committee also conducted an investigation. Adam Schiff described how

... we have learned a great deal about countless secret meetings, conversations and communications between Trump campaign officials and the Russians, all of which the Trump Administration initially denied, would later misrepresent, and finally be forced to acknowledge. Thirteen Russians have been indicted in a far reaching conspiracy in which the Russians sought to influence our election by helping Donald Trump, hurting the Hillary Clinton campaign and sowing discord in the United States. Most significant, high-ranking Trump campaign and Administration officials have also been indicted, including the President’s national security advisor, his campaign chair and deputy campaign chair, as well as one of his foreign policy advisors, and three of those have already pled guilty.

In May 2017, Glenn A. Fine, the acting Defense Department Inspector General, confirmed he was investigating Michael Flynn for misleading Pentagon investigators about his income from companies in Russia and contacts with officials there when he applied for a renewal of his top-secret security clearance. In October 2017, Paul Manafort and Rick Gates were indicted and arrested. George Papadopoulos and Flynn pleaded guilty to lying to the FBI during the Russia investigation. Papadopolous served a sentence. Flynn was pardoned by President Trump following the decision by the Department of Justice to drop the charges but Judge Emmet Sullivan delayed granting the dismissal.

After 22 months of investigation, Special Counsel Robert Mueller submitted his report to the Justice Department on March 22, 2019. The investigation "did not establish that members of the Trump campaign conspired or coordinated with the Russian government in its election interference activities".

== Media reports ==
The New York Times reported on February 14, 2017, that phone records and communications intercepts showed that Trump associates—including members of the Trump campaign—had "repeated contacts" with senior Russian intelligence officials during the 2016 campaign. Paul Manafort was the only Trump associate who was specifically identified as participating in these communications. In congressional testimony the following June, former FBI director James Comey, regarding the report by the New York Times, stated “in the main, it was not true”. The Times reported that during the intervening months, its sources continued to believe the reporting was "solid." In July 2020, the Senate Judiciary Committee released notes taken contemporaneously with the Times report by FBI Counterintelligence Division chief Peter Strzok indicating his skepticism about the Times' reporting, writing, "We have not seen evidence of any officials associated with the Trump team in contact with [intelligence officers]" and "We are unaware of ANY Trump advisors engaging in conversations with Russian intelligence officials." Despite this, the Times still stood by its account, claiming that the released notes did not provide a fully accurate representation of Strzok's knowledge. CNN reported on March 23, 2017, that the FBI was examining "human intelligence, travel, business and phone records and accounts of in-person meetings" indicating that Trump associates may have coordinated with "suspected Russian operatives" to release damaging information about the Hillary Clinton campaign. CNN reported on September 19, 2017, that Manafort had been a target of a FISA wiretap both before and after the 2016 election—beginning sometime after he became the subject of an FBI investigation in 2014—and extending into early 2017. Some of the intercepted communications raised concerns among investigators that Manafort had solicited assistance from Russians for the campaign, although the evidence was reportedly inconclusive. On April 30, 2018, The New York Times published a list of interview questions for Trump that the Mueller investigation had provided to the president's attorneys. Among the questions was "What knowledge did you have of any outreach by your campaign, including by Paul Manafort, to Russia about potential assistance to the campaign?"

== Steele dossier ==
The Steele dossier, also known as the Trump–Russia dossier, is a largely unsubstantiated political opposition research report written from June to December 2016 containing allegations of misconduct, conspiracy, and co-operation between Donald Trump's presidential campaign and the government of Russia prior to and during the 2016 election campaign. The media, the intelligence community, and most experts have treated the dossier with caution due to its unverified allegations, while Trump denounced it as fake news.

Lawfare has noted that the "Mueller investigation has clearly produced public records that confirm pieces of the dossier. And even where the details are not exact, the general thrust of Steele's reporting seems credible in light of what we now know about extensive contacts between numerous individuals associated with the Trump campaign and Russian government officials."

CNN described Paul Manafort's role in its report of intercepted communications among "suspected Russian operatives discussing their efforts to work with Manafort ... to coordinate information that could damage Hillary Clinton's election prospects ... The suspected operatives relayed what they claimed were conversations with Manafort, encouraging help from the Russians." These reported intercepts are considered "remarkably consistent with the raw intelligence in the Steele Dossier ... [which] states that the 'well-developed conspiracy of co-operation between [the Trump campaign] and the Russian leadership ... was managed on the TRUMP side by the Republican candidate's campaign manager, Paul MANAFORT'."

David A. Graham, staff writer at The Atlantic, has written: "It's no wonder Trump is upset about the dossier, but his mantra that 'there was no collusion [and] everybody including the Dems knows there was no collusion' rings false these days. While there's not yet any public evidence to indicate a crime was committed, or that Trump was involved, it is clear that the Trump campaign and later transition were eager to work with Russia, and to keep that secret." (See also: Mueller report#False "no collusion" claims)

== See also ==
- Foreign electoral intervention
- IP3 International
- Nunes memo
- Russian espionage in the United States
- Timeline of Russian interference in the 2016 United States elections
- Timeline of Russian interference in the 2016 United States elections (July 2016–election day)
- Timeline of post-election transition following Russian interference in the 2016 United States elections
- Timeline of investigations into Trump and Russia (January–June 2017)
- Timeline of investigations into Trump and Russia (July–December 2017)
- Timeline of investigations into Trump and Russia (January–June 2018)
- Timeline of investigations into Trump and Russia (July–December 2018)
- Timeline of investigations into Trump and Russia (2019–2020)
- Trump campaign–Russian meeting on June 9, 2016
