= Carter Page =

American oil industry consultant (born 1971)

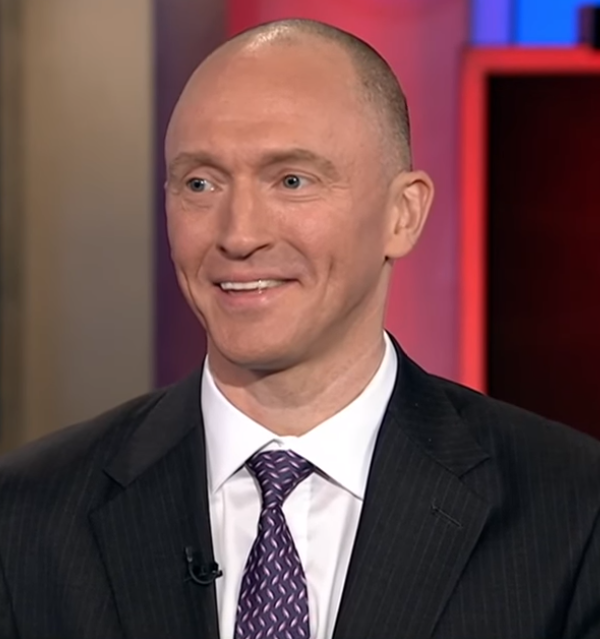
- Page in 2017

Personal details
- Born: Carter William Page; June 3, 1971 (age 55) Minneapolis, Minnesota, U.S.
- Party: Republican
- Education: United States Naval Academy (BS); Georgetown University (MA); New York University (MBA); SOAS, University of London (PhD); Fordham University (LLM)

Military service
- Allegiance: United States
- Branch/service: United States Navy
- Years of service: 1993–98 (Navy); 1998–2004 (Navy Reserve)
- Rank: Lieutenant

Carter William Page (born June 3, 1971) is an American petroleum industry consultant and a former foreign-policy adviser to Donald Trump during his 2016 presidential election campaign. Page is the founder and managing partner of Global Energy Capital, a one-man investment fund and consulting firm specializing in the Russian and Central Asian oil and gas business.

Page was a focus of multiple government investigations examining the 2016 Russian election interference and possible links to the Trump campaign. The FBI obtained four FISA warrants to surveil Page beginning in October 2016; in 2019, the Justice Department determined the final two warrants were invalid. In April 2019, the Mueller report concluded that the investigation "did not establish that Page coordinated with the Russian government" in its interference efforts.

DOJ Inspector General Michael E. Horowitz identified 17 significant errors and omissions in the FISA applications in December 2019. The bipartisan Senate Intelligence Committee found in August 2020 that despite FISA problems, Page's "previous ties to Russian intelligence officers, coupled with his Russian travel, justified the FBI's initial concerns." Special Counsel John Durham prosecuted FBI attorney Kevin Clinesmith, who pleaded guilty in August 2020 to altering a CIA email used in the warrant process. Durham's May 2023 report concluded that the FBI "did not and could not corroborate any of the substantive allegations" in the Steele dossier used to support the warrants, characterizing the Page surveillance as a "dry hole."

Page was never charged with any crime. He has filed four lawsuits related to the investigations; all were dismissed by courts.

== Life and career ==
Carter Page was born in Minneapolis, Minnesota, on June 3, 1971, the son of Allan Robert Page and Rachel (Greenstein) Page. His father was from Galway, New York, and his mother was from Minneapolis. His father was a manager and executive with the Central Hudson Gas & Electric Company.

=== Education and military service ===
Page was raised in Poughkeepsie, New York, and graduated from Poughkeepsie's Our Lady of Lourdes High School in 1989. Page graduated with a Bachelor of Science from the United States Naval Academy in 1993; he graduated with distinction (top 10% of his class) and was chosen for the Navy's Trident Scholar program, which gives selected officers the opportunity for independent academic research and study. During his senior year at the Naval Academy, he worked in the office of U.S. Representative Les Aspin as a researcher for the House Armed Services Committee. He served in the U.S. Navy for five years, including a tour in western Morocco as an intelligence officer for a United Nations peacekeeping mission, and attained the rank of lieutenant. In 1994, he completed an MA degree in National Security Studies at Georgetown University. After leaving active duty in 1998, Page was a member of the Navy's inactive reserve until 2004.

=== Further education and business ===
After leaving the Navy, Page completed a fellowship at the Council on Foreign Relations, and in 2001 he received an MBA degree from New York University. In 2000, he began work as an investment banker with Merrill Lynch in the firm's London office, was a vice president in the company's Moscow office, and later served as COO for Merrill Lynch's energy and power department in New York. Page has stated that he worked on transactions involving Gazprom and other leading Russian energy companies. According to business people interviewed by Politico in 2016, Page's work in Moscow was at a subordinate level, and he himself remained largely unknown to decision-makers.

After leaving Merrill Lynch in 2008, Page founded his own investment fund, Global Energy Capital, with partner James Richard and a former mid-level Gazprom executive, Sergei Yatsenko. The fund operates out of a Manhattan co-working space shared with a booking agency for wedding bands, and as of late 2017, Page was the firm's sole employee. Other businesspeople working in the Russian energy sector said in 2016 that the fund had yet to actually realize a project. The building which contains Page's working space is connected to Trump Tower by an atrium, a fact Page referenced when describing his work for the 2016 Trump campaign in a 2017 letter to the Senate Intelligence Committee.

Page received a PhD degree from SOAS, University of London in 2012, where he was supervised by Shirin Akiner. His doctoral dissertation on the transition of Asian countries from communism to capitalism was rejected twice before ultimately being accepted by new examiners. One of his original examiners later said Page "knew next to nothing" about the subject matter and was unfamiliar with "basic concepts" such as Marxism and state capitalism. He sought unsuccessfully to publish his dissertation as a book; a reviewer described it as "very analytically confused, just throwing a lot of stuff out there without any real kind of argument." Page blamed the rejection on anti-Russian and anti-American bias. He later ran an international affairs program at Bard College and taught a course on energy and politics at New York University. In more recent years, he has written columns in Global Policy Journal, a publication of Durham University. In 2022, he earned an LLM (cum laude) from Fordham University School of Law.

=== Foreign policy and ties to Russia ===
In 1998, Page joined the Eurasia Group, a strategy consulting firm, but left three months later. In 2017, Eurasia Group president Ian Bremmer recalled on his Twitter feed that Page's strong pro-Russian stance was "not a good fit" for the firm and that Page was its "most wackadoodle" alumnus. Stephen Sestanovich later described Page's foreign-policy views as having "an edgy Putinist resentment" and a sympathy to Russian leader Vladimir Putin's criticisms of the United States. Over time, Page became increasingly critical of United States foreign policy toward Russia, and more supportive of Putin, with a United States official describing Page as "a brazen apologist for anything Moscow did". Page is frequently quoted by Russian state television, where he is presented as a "famous American economist".

In August 2013, Page wrote, "Over the past half year, I have had the privilege to serve as an informal advisor to the staff of the Kremlin in preparation for their Presidency of the G-20 Summit next month, where energy issues will be a prominent point on the agenda." Page described his role differently in 2018: "I sat in on some meetings, but to call me an advisor is way over the top."

Also in 2013, Evgeny Buryakov and two other Russians attempted to recruit Page as an intelligence source, and one of them, Victor Podobnyy, described Page as enthusiastic about business opportunities in Russia but an "idiot". "I also promised him a lot," Podobnyy reported to a fellow Russian intelligence officer at the time, according to an FBI transcript of their conversation, which was covertly recorded. "How else to work with foreigners?" Podobnyy added.

Page was the subject of a Foreign Intelligence Surveillance Act (FISA) warrant in 2014, at least two years earlier than was indicated in the stories concerning his role in the 2016 presidential campaign of Donald Trump. 2017 news accounts about the warrant indicated it was granted because of Page's ties to Buryakov, Podobnyy, and the third Russian who attempted to recruit him, Igor Sporyshev.

=== Trump 2016 presidential campaign ===
Trump announced Page as a foreign policy adviser in his campaign on March 21, 2016. On September 23, 2016, Yahoo News reported U.S. intelligence officials investigated alleged contacts between Page and Russian officials subject to U.S. sanctions, including Igor Sechin, the president of state-run Russian oil conglomerate Rosneft. Page promptly left the Trump campaign. Upon his departure, Trump campaign communications director Jason Miller said of Page, "He’s never been a part of our campaign. Period." Another campaign spokesman, Steven Cheung, stated, "we are not aware of any of his activities, past or present."

Shortly after Page left the Trump campaign, the Federal Bureau of Investigation obtained another warrant from the United States Foreign Intelligence Surveillance Court (FISC) in October 2016 to surveil Page's communications and read his saved emails. To issue the warrant, a federal judge concluded there was probable cause to believe that Page was a foreign agent knowingly engaging in clandestine intelligence for the Russian government. The initial 90-day warrant was subsequently renewed three times. The New York Times reported on May 18, 2018, that the surveillance warrant expired around October 2017. The FBI did not use a so-called "filter team" to prevent irrelevant information from being seen by investigators, and it was later determined that use of such a team is not required.

In January 2017, Page's name appeared repeatedly in the Steele dossier containing allegations of close interactions between the Trump campaign and the Kremlin. By the end of January 2017, Page was under investigation by the Federal Bureau of Investigation, the Central Intelligence Agency, the National Security Agency, the Director of National Intelligence, and the Financial Crimes Enforcement Network. Page was not accused of any wrongdoing.

The Trump Administration attempted to distance itself from Page, saying that he had never met Trump or advised him about anything, but a December 2016 Page press conference in Russia contradicts the claim that Page and Trump never met. Page responded to a question about his contact with Trump saying, "I've certainly been in a number of meetings with him and I've learned a tremendous amount from him." The Mueller Report found that Page produced work for the campaign, traveled with Trump to a campaign speech and "Chief policy adviser Sam Clovis expressed appreciation for Page's work and praised his work to other Campaign officials".

In October 2017, Page said he would not cooperate with requests to appear before the Senate Intelligence Committee and would assert his Fifth Amendment right against self-incrimination. He said this was because they were requesting documents dating back to 2010, and he did not want to be caught in a "perjury trap". He expressed the wish to testify before the committee in an open setting.

On July 21, 2018, the Justice Department released a heavily redacted version of the October 2016 FISA warrant application for Page, which expressed in part the FBI's belief that Page "has been collaborating and conspiring with the Russian government", as well as that Page had been the subject of targeted recruitment by Russian intelligence agencies. The application also said that Page and a Russian intelligence operative had met in secret to discuss compromising material (kompromat) the Russian government held against "Candidate #2" (presumed to be Hillary Clinton) and the possibility of the Russians giving it to the Trump campaign. Former U.S. Attorney for the District of Columbia Joseph diGenova, who was under consideration to join Trump's legal team in 2018, argued before and after release of the Mueller Report that the FISA warrants to surveil Page were obtained illegally. Other observers opposed diGenova's view, pointing out that the warrants were approved by four different judges, all of whom were appointed by Republican presidents.

The FBI applications to the FISA court to wiretap Page were partly founded on the Steele dossier, and the dossier "played a central and essential role" in the FBI applications to the FISA court to wiretap Page.

In 2019 the Justice Department determined the last two of four FISA warrants to surveil Page were invalid.

=== House Intelligence Committee testimony ===
On November 2, 2017, Page testified to the House Intelligence Committee that he had kept senior officials in the Trump campaign such as Corey Lewandowski, Hope Hicks, and J. D. Gordon informed about his contacts with the Russians and had informed Jeff Sessions, Lewandowski, Hicks and other Trump campaign officials that he was traveling to Russia to give a speech in July 2016.

Page testified that he had met with Russian government officials during this trip and had sent a post-meeting report via email to members of the Trump campaign. He also indicated that campaign co-chairman Sam Clovis had asked him to sign a non-disclosure agreement about his trip. Elements of Page's testimony contradicted prior claims by Trump, Sessions, and others in the Trump administration. Lewandowski, who had previously denied knowing Page or meeting him during the campaign, said after Page's testimony that his memory was refreshed and acknowledged that he had been aware of Page's trip to Russia.

Page also testified that after delivering a commencement speech at the New Economic School in Moscow, he spoke briefly with one of the people in attendance, Arkady Dvorkovich, a Deputy Prime Minister in Dmitry Medvedev's cabinet, contradicting his previous statements not to have spoken to anyone connected with the Russian government. In addition, while Page denied a meeting with Sechin as alleged in the Steele dossier, he did admit he met with Andrey Baranov, Rosneft's head of investor relations. The dossier alleges that Sechin offered Page a brokerage fee from the sale of up to 19 percent of Rosneft if he worked to roll back Magnitsky Act economic sanctions that had been imposed on Russia in 2012. Page testified that he did not "directly" express support for lifting the sanctions during the meeting with Baranov, but that he might have mentioned the proposed Rosneft transaction.

== Government investigation findings ==
=== Mueller report findings ===
When the Mueller Report was released in April 2019, it described Page's testimony about his role in the 2016 Trump campaign and connections to individuals in Russia as contradictory and confusing, and his contacts with Russians before and during the campaign as tangential and eccentric. He was not charged with any crimes, though the report indicated there were unanswered questions about his actions and motives: "The investigation did not establish that Page coordinated with the Russian government in its efforts to interfere with the 2016 presidential election." However, with incomplete "evidence or testimony about who Page may have met or communicated with in Moscow", "Page's activities in Russia – as described in his emails with the [Trump campaign] – were not fully explained."

=== Horowitz report findings ===
In December 2019, Michael E. Horowitz, the Inspector General for the Department of Justice, concluded an investigation into the circumstances of the FBI's investigation into the 2016 Trump campaign and its ties to Russia, codenamed Crossfire Hurricane. On December 9, 2019, US Inspector General Michael Horowitz testified to Congress that the FBI showed no political bias at the initiation of the investigation into Trump and possible connections with Russia. However, he also stated in a Senate hearing that he could not rule out political bias as a potential motivation. Horowitz said he had no evidence the warrant problems were caused by intentional malfeasance or political bias rather than "gross incompetence and negligence", adding his report was not an exoneration: "It doesn't vindicate anybody at the F.B.I. who touched this, including the leadership."

Horowitz did fault the FBI for overreaching and mistakes during the investigation. These included failing to disclose, when applying for a FISA warrant to surveil Page in October 2016, that he had provided the Central Intelligence Agency (CIA) details of his prior contacts with Russian officials, including an incident the FBI indicated made Page's conduct suspicious. In June 2017, FBI received written confirmation from the CIA that Page was an "operational contact" (a source who reported information from routine activities in foreign countries) of the CIA from 2008 to 2013. However, FBI attorney Kevin Clinesmith illegally doctored the email from the CIA liaison by inserting the words "and not a source", before forwarding it to another FBI agent who provided the written material for the fourth FISA application, which was submitted later in the month. According to the Horowitz Report, if the FISA court judges had been informed of Page's CIA relationship, his conduct might have seemed less suspicious, although the Report did not speculate on "whether the correction of any particular misstatement or omission, or some combination thereof, would have resulted in a different outcome." Horowitz referred Clinesmith to prosecutors for potential criminal charges.

In a December 10, 2019, interview on Hannity, Page indicated that he had retained attorneys to review the Horowitz Report and determine whether he has grounds to sue.

In December 2019, the Justice Department secretly notified the FISA court that in at least two of the 2017 warrant renewal requests "there was insufficient predication to establish probable cause" to believe Page was acting as a Russian agent.

In a subsequent analysis of 29 unrelated FISA warrant requests, Horowitz found numerous typographical errors but just two material errors, which were determined not to impact the justifications for the resulting surveillance.

=== Senate Intelligence Committee findings ===
The Republican-controlled committee released its final report on 2016 Russian election interference in August 2020, finding that despite problems with the FISA warrant requests used to surveil him, the FBI was justified in its counterintelligence concerns about Page. The committee found Page evasive and his "responses to basic questions were meandering, avoidant and involved several long diversions." The committee found that although Page's advisory role in the Trump campaign from March 2016 to September 2016 was insignificant, Russian operatives may have thought he was more important than he actually was.

=== Durham report findings ===
In May 2023, Special Counsel John Durham released his final report on the FBI's Crossfire Hurricane investigation. The report found that "within days of their receipt, the unvetted and unverified Steele Reports were used to support probable cause in the FBI's FISA applications targeting (Carter) Page," and that this occurred "at a time when the FBI knew that the same information Steele had provided to the FBI had also been fed to the media and others in Washington, D.C."

Durham concluded that the Crossfire Hurricane investigation "did not and could not corroborate any of the substantive allegations" contained in the Steele dossier. The report characterized the Page surveillance as a "dry hole," with agents concluding that "Page was not a witting agent of the Russian government." On August 14, 2020, Clinesmith pleaded guilty to a felony for making a false statement by altering the email. On January 29, 2021, Clinesmith was sentenced to 12 months federal probation and 400 hours of community service after pleading guilty in August to making a false statement.

Page was never charged with any crime.

== Lawsuits ==
=== Against DNC and Perkins Coie ===
In October 2018, Carter Page unsuccessfully sued the Democratic National Committee (DNC), Perkins Coie, and two Perkins Coie partners, for defamation. The lawsuit was dismissed on January 31, 2019. Page said he intended to appeal the decision.

On January 30, 2020, Page filed another defamation lawsuit (Case: 1:20-cv-00671, Filed: 01/30/20) against the DNC and Perkins Coie, naming Marc Elias and Michael Sussmann as defendants. The suit was dismissed.

=== Against Oath Inc. (Yahoo! News and HuffPost). Filed by Carter Page ===
On February 11, 2021, Page lost a defamation suit he had filed against Yahoo! News and HuffPost for their articles that described his activities mentioned in the Steele dossier. The judge wrote: "The article simply says that U.S. intelligence agencies were investigating reports of plaintiff's meetings with Russian officials, which Plaintiff admits is true."

Page's suit targeted Oath for 11 articles, especially one written by Michael Isikoff and published by Yahoo! News in September 2016. The judge dismissed the suit on February 11, 2021, noting that "Page's arguments regarding Isikoff's description of the dossier and Steele were 'either sophistry or political spin'." He also said that Page "failed to allege actual malice by any of the authors, and that the three articles written by HuffPost employees were true". Page was represented by attorneys John Pierce and L. Lin Wood, who was denied permission to represent Page because of his actions in the attempts to overturn the 2020 United States presidential election in favor of President Donald Trump.

In January 2022, Page lost an effort to revive the defamation case over Isikoff's article. Chief Justice Collins J. Seitz Jr. said "the article at the crux of the case—by Yahoo News reporter Michael Isikoff—was either completely truthful or, 'at a minimum,' conveyed a true 'gist,' even if it included some 'minor' or 'irrelevant' incorrect statements." Bloomberg Law reported that "The court dismissed as far-fetched Page's theories about a conspiracy among interconnected media and political figures to tarnish Trump by concocting the Russia investigation from thin air."

On May 16, 2022, the U.S. Supreme Court refused to hear a defamation suit filed by Page.

=== Against USA, DOJ, FBI, and several officials ===
On November 27, 2020, Page filed a $75 million (approximately $91.8 million in 2025) suit against the United States, DOJ, FBI, and several former leading officials alleging they violated "his Constitutional and other legal rights in connection with unlawful surveillance and investigation of him by the United States Government". The defendants included James Comey, Andrew McCabe, Kevin Clinesmith, Peter Strzok, Lisa Page, Joe Pientka III, Stephen Soma, and Brian J. Auten.

The suit was dismissed on September 1, 2022, by United States district court judge Dabney L. Friedrich, who wrote:

To the extent these allegations are true, there is little question that many individual defendants, as well as the agency as a whole, engaged in wrongdoing. Even so, Page has brought no actionable claim against any individual defendant or against the United States.

On April 22, 2026, Page was awarded a settlement of $1.25 million.

== U.S. House of Representatives candidacy ==
In September 2025, Page entered Texas's 18th congressional district special election as a Republican. The election was held on November 4 and resulted in Democrats Christian Menefee and Amanda Edwards advancing to a runoff election scheduled for January 31, 2026, which Menefee won

== See also ==
- Michael Flynn
- Paul Manafort
- Rick Gates (political consultant)
- Roger Stone
- Timeline of investigations into Trump and Russia
- Durham special counsel investigation

== Publications ==
- Page, Carter (2020). Abuse and Power: How an Innocent American Was Framed in an Attempted Coup Against the President. Regnery Publishing. ISBN 978-1-68451-121-1.
