= Conspiracy theories in United States politics =

In United States politics, conspiracy theories are beliefs that a major political situation is the result of secretive collusion by powerful people striving to harm a rival group or undermine society in general.

Such theories draw from actual conspiracies, in which individuals work together covertly in order to unravel a larger system. Often, the struggle between a real conspiracy theory and a misconception of one leads to conflict, polarization in elections, distrust in government, and racial and political divisions.

Many political conspiracy theories begin and spread from politically charged circumstances, individuals' partisan affiliations, and online platforms that form echo chambers with like-minded individuals. Belief in American political conspiracy theories applies to all parties, ideologies, races, ethnicities, socioeconomic levels, and genders.

== Contributions ==
=== Circumstantial fear ===
Conspiracy theories often arise during new political or social circumstances in which one group of people feels threatened by another group that is politically, religiously, ethnically, racially, or economically different from them. Theories began as early as the European colonization of the Americas when colonists deemed Native Americans as threats. As a result, many colonists, including Cotton Mather, speculated that Native Americans were controlled by the devil. Some even believed in the "myth of the super-chief," in which every Indigenous attack was orchestrated by a tribal chief, who controlled thousands of Native American fighters and strove to wipe out the whites.

Northern Republicans in the mid-1860s believed President Andrew Johnson was conspiring with ex-Confederates to undo the abolition of slavery.

Theories also arose in response to the counterculture, feminist, and anti-war era of the 1960s. Many (but not all) conservatives felt threatened and began to believe that the movements had been formed with communist motivations to undermine the U.S. government. During the 1990s, many right-wing conspiracy theorists also feared that the Clintons were involved in drug cartels and assassinations. Some have theorized that the government is planting drugs in predominantly-black neighborhoods to breed a greater rate of incarceration and crime in the community. In 2020, many conspiracy theories circulated during the coronavirus pandemic partly because of the increased anxiety, larger number of people staying at home, and greater focus on the Internet and social media outlets. One such conspiracy that proliferated from the 2020 Presidential election was QAnon.

Conspiracy theories exist because of fear of the other or frustration with one's own disenfranchisement. They correlate with an increase in social, political, or economic changes in society and are often responses to rationalize anxiety about such events. Conspiracy theories tend to be brought into context with the country's ideals and laws. Frank Donner, a 1980s civil liberties lawyer, claimed:

Especially in times of stress, exaggerated febrile explanations of unwelcome reality come to the surface of American life and attract support. [The new conspiratorial movements] illuminate a striking contrast between our claims to superiority, indeed our mission as a redeemer nation to bring a new world order, and the extraordinary fragility of our confidence in our institutions. [That] has led some observers to conclude that we are, subconsciously, quite insecure about the value and permanence of our society.

Conspiracy theories arise among all races and parties because of the fear of a society and a country destabilizing and how that would affect one's own life. Conspiracy theories, according to Benedictine University Professor of Psychology James Davis, come in three related types:

A recent review proposes three categories of motivations underlying belief in conspiracy theories.... The motivation people have to seek causal explanations to reduce uncertainty... and to feel in control and safe in their lives.... A third motivation for conspiracy theory endorsement is the desire for individuals to see themselves and their group in a more positive light.

==== Class structures and lack of trust in government ====
The class structure is also likely to influence one's belief in a political conspiracy theory. Those with a low income, a lack of higher education, or a lack of secure employment are more likely to believe in conspiracy theories due to a general feeling of helplessness. This lack of control is correlated with class: individuals from higher classes have been proven to feel more in control of their lives, employment, education, and standard of living. A low socioeconomic status can generate political and economic anxiety and a desire to explain the dire circumstances. That helplessness may lead several to find a psychologically-soothing explanation: the idea that a group of government actors is plotting against them.

Those with higher education or a higher IQ level still engage in conspiracy theories. In fact, many conspiracy theories require substantial mental effort to understand. Believers are defined by more than just their class; they also engage in the psychological phenomenon of confirmation bias in which they accept information validating their beliefs and reject information that is inconsistent with their theories.

Many individuals also live in positions in which specific government policies may cause economic distress. For example, many Americans believe that the government is forcing health industries to hide the cure for cancer. They also have been taking drugs that are not approved by the Food and Drug Administration because they do not trust the medical industry. This likely stems from a fear of and frustration with current U.S. policies on public health. Many ill Americans cannot afford healthcare and may look to sources that blame the medical industry, including conspiracies. This may also originate from a history of fear about the government's lack of transparency or truth in terms of medication since American doctors once approved mercury, radioactive material, and cigarettes and falsely deemed them to be healthy.

According to the Pew Research Center 22% of Americans trust their government to do what is right "just about always" or "most of the time" as of April 2024. The moving average of this percentage has not been above 50% since the Bush administration (2001) displaying a massive distrust across the nation in the 21st century.

=== Partisan affiliations ===
Partisan affiliations sometimes help determine belief in conspiracy theories, but this depends on the theory. There is a correlation between political parties and beliefs in the "birther" conspiracy, the Kennedy assassination conspiracy, the "truther" conspiracy, the "levee breach" theory, and the "death panel" conspiracy. Partisanship loyalty affects beliefs in some theories, and "conspiratorial thinking," a general paranoia about the government, determines others. Conspiracy theories directly affiliated with the Obama administration (e.g., the "birthers" and "death panel" conspiracy theories) leaned politically to the right, and Democrats were less likely to believe in theories that lobbied against Obama and his policies. As for the "levee breach," "truther," and Kennedy assassination conspiracy theories, both political parties had a similar number of people believing in them. Individuals who believed in those specific theories also had a previous affinity for conspiratorial thinking or questioning the credibility of governmental actors. However, it has also been studied that conspiratorial thinkers may be more focused on an anti-governmental mindset because of their lack of trust in higher authority rather than a specific theory or party.

Each partisan group is partial to believing in conspiracies that target the opposite party because it disbelieves the other party's ideologies and policies. Therefore, conspiracy theories can come from both political affiliations. In fact, the University of Miami political scientist Joseph Uscinski stated that "both sides are equally conspiratorial in their thinking... No one has a monopoly."

=== Intuitionist versus rationalist model ===
University of Chicago Political Science Professor Eric Oliver has created a theory that intuitionism and rationalism are two psychological patterns of thought that can shape specific conspiracy theories and perhaps even catalyze partisan divisions. Intuitionism is individuals relying on their emotional responses to current events and then using heuristics to create an explanation for why the events are happening. Rationalists instead determine the causes and effects of events based on quantitative evidence. Both intuitionists and rationalists believe in conspiracies, Oliver argues, but intuitionists more commonly associate themselves with conspiracies for their association with more qualitative emotional data stemming from anxiety about society.

==== Polarization ====
Oliver speculates that the current polarization occurs because of increasingly far-right and far-left thinking, but it also might come from the conflict between intuitionists and rationalists. Throughout history, the right-wing has become increasingly intuitionist, often using Biblical or Christian themes to justify political beliefs or trust in the existence of conspiracies. The left-wing has been commonly associated with basing belief on quantitative thought rather than religious affiliation. Conspiratorial beliefs may stem from a misinterpretation of numerical data.

Often, political parties engage in an us versus them mentality when understanding theories and believing that the opposite party started the conspiracy. By tying specific theories to political affiliation, many party members become polarized. In fact, Steven Smallpage, Adam Enders, and Joseph Uscinski, political researchers and authors of Research and Politics, explained:

Although conspiracy theories are often attributed to cognitive hiccups, psychological traits, or psychopathologies, they actually follow the contours of more familiar partisan battles in the age of polarization... Many conspiracy theories function more like associative partisan attitudes than markers of alienated psychology.

=== Political ignorance ===
Lack of awareness of political issues may also perpetuate belief in conspiracy theories. Often, because individuals believe that they have "just one vote" with little impact, they have little motivation to look at politics objectively or to discover credible information about current events. Individuals apathetic towards politics may remain ignorant about issues. As voters latch onto ignorance and apathy, some may care little whether political information is biased or sometimes even true. Lack of knowledge about how political systems function or about a given political candidate makes people much more likely to believe extreme or false claims, such as conspiracy theories.

=== Echo chambers and spread ===
Conspiracy theories have evolved with the media. YouTube, Facebook, Instagram, Twitter, Pinterest, and other social media sites use algorithms to bring up posts, videos, and news that correlate with past searches and interests. Conservative users commonly receive conservative information, liberal users usually receive liberal news, and every opinion in between likely receives likewise. Social media is a key element in creating echo chambers for conspiracy theorists.

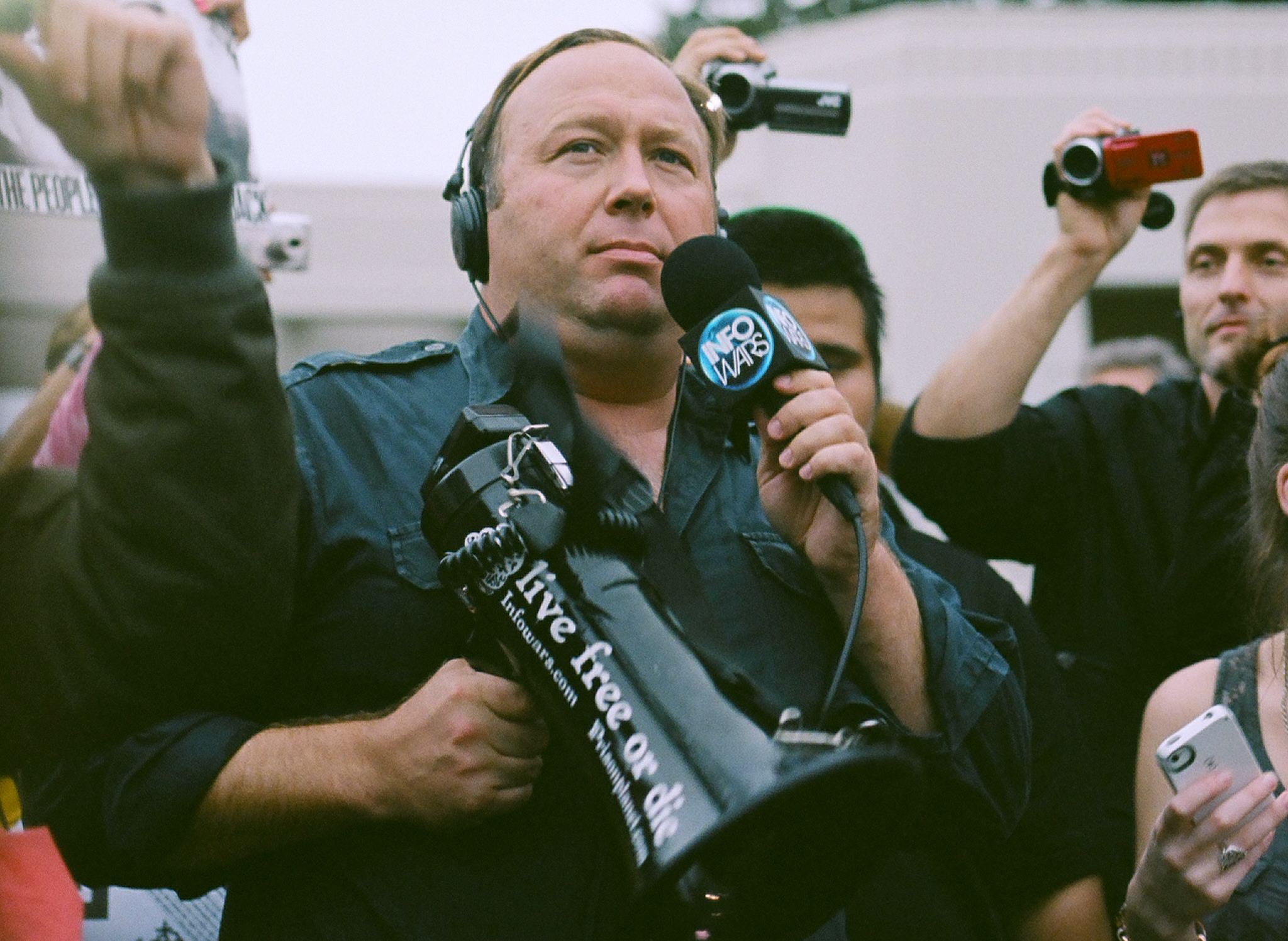
Alex Jones, the creator of InfoWars

One example of echo chambers is Alex Jones, the talk show host of InfoWars. A far-right host who discusses and analyzes political issues, Jones has frequently brought up information that was deemed extreme and sometimes even false, several times with little evidence to back up his claims. Because of the ability of YouTube, Twitter, Facebook, Instagram, and other social media platforms to connect individuals with similar thinking and beliefs, InfoWars and its community grew quickly, and like-minded individuals were given extreme information that they were more likely to believe because of their political affiliations.

=== Nationalism and multiculturalism ===
The fear of a divided nation, or the definition of what it means to be "American" also causes several conspiracies. Often, whenever a nationality, ethnicity, sexual orientation, or gender differs from specific identities with which someone already affiliates, fear of national overthrow, oppression by a separate group, or attack on one's own way of life form a distinct "us versus them" mentality. As such fears and mentalities proliferate within like-minded groups, conspiracy theories form on the opposing party to justify the group's existence and beliefs. For example, conspiracy theories have been perpetuated in the African-American community that the U.S. government instigated AIDS or cocaine into the population, which follows the fear of one group oppressing another (in this case, white Americans). Conspiracy theories have also been created concerning Native Americans that either argues against or advocates for them.

Robert Alan Goldberg, a University of Utah professor of history, also states that both stigmatized and more privileged groups struggle with conspiracy theories about the other:

"Recall a uniquely American word – Un-American. There are no unFrench, or UnSwedish, or UnIsraeli counterparts. Americans harbor this suspicion, the danger of betrayal from within...."

Americans are afraid of having their identity as "Americans," compromised by the "other" group that is different from them culturally, ethnically, racially, or religiously. Thus, several conspiracy theories have affected the social life of the Indigenous, blacks, and whites.

== Impacts ==
=== Elections ===
Several conspiracy theories have been generated out of elections. One such theory involves claims of large-scale election fraud. Allegations that ballots have been faked or altered spans political parties, genders, and races. Partisan affiliations and conspiratorial thinking are both to blame.

Before a given election, belief in widespread voter fraud influencing the election outcomes commonly derives from conspiratorial thinking and distrust in higher authority. After an election, belief in fraud generally derives from partisan affiliations and usually originate in the losing party. While both Democrats and Republicans believe in the existence of election fraud, they generally allege different types of fraud. Republicans more often allege the casting of illegal ballots, such as from noncitizens, while Democrats generally allege that their supporters will be prevented from voting by voter suppression. Conspiracy theories, the fear of an opposite party, and their influence as a result may drive citizens to vote and influence the outcomes of an election.

==== 2016 ====
During the 2016 presidential election between Hillary Clinton and Donald Trump, many conspiracy theories developed and spread on social media about the opposite candidate, particularly theories against Clinton or Trump's other opponents. Social media platforms, especially Facebook, were accused of fanning the flames of fake news. Because 44% of Americans receive their news from Facebook, and some claim that if Facebook does not filter disinformation in extreme posts, the conspiracy theories could be dangerous. Others argue that such filtering works as censorship that might conflict with the First Amendment.

==== 2020 ====
Symbol of QAnon

Both during and after the 2020 presidential election, several conspiracy theories spread on social media, particularly on Facebook and Twitter. The QAnon conspiracy theory originated in the U.S. and alleges that Trump is fighting against a deep state cabal of "child sex-abusing" and "Satan-worshipping" Democrats. QAnon generated over 100 million comments and likes on Facebook in the year 2020 alone.

Although the actual number of QAnon adherents is unclear, the group maintains a large online following. Many expressed the fear that QAnon's influence and its belief that Donald Trump will save the world constituted support for Trump's threats to prevent a peaceful transfer of power. Since the Associated Press declared Biden the winner of the 2020 presidential election, however, QAnon followers have experienced a crisis of faith or been in denial and believe that Trump is working behind the scenes to defeat the "shadowy forces" that determined Biden's win.

Facebook has banned over 790 QAnon-related groups, 100 pages, and 1,500 advertisements in an attempt to dispel it. Instagram has also taken action by restricting over 10,000 accounts for which QAnon could affect population and the election. To avoid the creation of echo chambers and further political polarization, Facebook prevents QAnon groups from forming but allows individuals to post their support occasionally. Facebook has also prevented followers from organizing fundraisers and selling merchandise to raise money for the organization. After Trump lost the election to Biden, updates from Q declined dramatically, with the last post by Q made in December 2020. QAnon beliefs became a part of attempts to overturn the election and culminated in Trump supporters attacking the United States Capitol. That has led to a further crackdown on QAnon-related content on social media.

The stolen election conspiracy theory claims that the 2020 United States presidential election was "stolen" from Donald Trump, who lost that election to Joe Biden. It justifies attempts to overturn the 2020 United States presidential election, including the 2021 storming of the United States Capitol. A particular variant of this theory is the conspiracy theory that claims George Soros stole the election from Trump. Polls conducted since the aftermath of the 2020 election have consistently shown that the majority of Republicans believe that the election was "stolen" from Trump. A 2024 YouGov poll showed that a majority (75%) of Republicans still believe that the 2020 election was "stolen" from Donald Trump.

==== 2024 ====
During the 2024 presidential election campaign, supporters of Donald Trump and the candidate himself resurrected false claims from 2020 that the election could not be trusted, including allegations of mail-in voting fraud, widespread noncitizen voting, and "vote-flipping" by voting machines. Many political observers have noted that once the election was called for Trump, claims of fraud "vanished."

Election law expert Richard Hasen said Trump's voter fraud claims "were never serious. They were a way to delegitimize Democratic victories and to provide a pretext for possibly seeking to contest or overturn the results in a close election in which a Democrat won," adding, "I expect the claims will be revived again when they might serve a political purpose."

Following the re-election of Donald Trump in November 2024, conspiracy theories began to emerge among some supporters of the Kamala Harris campaign alleging that the election had been stolen by bad actors supporting Trump's candidacy. Though unsupported by Harris or her campaign representatives and significantly smaller in scale than Republican denialism following the 2020 election, the claims bear the same earmarks of conspiratorial thinking as GOP denialism: a lack of evidence, and the suggestion of a vast network of hidden actors undermining what was in fact (like 2020) a secure and verified election.

NewsGuard, a service that tracks and assesses online misinformation, identified unevidenced allegations claiming that Trump had won by fraud within hours of the election being called. NewsGuard CEO Gordon Crovitz told Wired magazine, "There are 92,100 mentions of 'Trump cheated' on X since midnight" on the day after Election Day.

One theory alleges that Elon Musk's satellite internet company Starlink was used to rig the election in favor of Trump, a claim refuted by the Cybersecurity and Infrastructure Security Agency. Statements from secretaries of state of both major parties in swing states including Georgia, Wisconsin, Michigan, and Pennsylvania note that their systems are not connected to the internet during voting and therefore are not vulnerable to an online hack.

A second claim alleges that 14-20 million Democratic votes were "missing" from the final tally compared to Biden's popular vote total in 2020. In fact, the claim first surfaced shortly after the race was called, with millions of votes still uncounted in California and elsewhere. As of Nov. 19, 2024, the gap between Biden and Harris had shrunk to 7.34 million votes, a number explained by lower Democratic turnout.

Trump himself, as well as the current Vice President JD Vance, has been credibly linked to the Dark Enlightenment conspiracy, with founder Curtis Yarvin having attended his 2021 inaugural gala as reported by Politico

=== Harm ===
Conspiracy theories in the United States have been known to cause harm.

- The false conspiracy theory regarding the Sandy Hook school shooting led to the harassment of the victims' families.
- False claims of election fraud led to the January 6 United States Capitol attack. They also undercut trust in the infrastructure of democracy in a way that former US "disinformation czar" Nina Jankowicz notes can "[set] us up for more disinformation and disengagement." Election law expert David Becker warns that "the damage that's been done to voter confidence [by false fraud claims]...is long-lasting."
- Certain conspiracy theories have tapped into racism to further spread their messages.

== List of conspiracy theories ==
Peter Knight, ed. Conspiracy theories in American history: an encyclopedia (2 vol. ABC-CLIO, 2003) contains 300 entries by 123 experts in 925 pages.

- AIDS and the African American community: Statements that the AIDS epidemic was actually started by the U.S. government to disenfranchise and weaken the African American community. These ideas have been promoted by mainstream Black media and celebrities, furthering conspiratorial beliefs. Some of the theories state that a cure for the disease already exists, but pharmaceutical companies are withholding it from the general public. Some attribute the popularity of this conspiracy theory to historically consistent mistreatment of the African American community and say that such mistreatment has led to mass anxiety and distrust of American governmental systems.
- Vaccine hesitancy is reluctance and often refusal to vaccinate oneself or one's children, from fear of rare vaccination complications. It is often encouraged by conspiracy theories. A belief that a link exists between vaccines and autism has been widely disproven, but false information continues to circulate and to found such claims of conspiracy. Opposition to vaccination was named one of the top ten threats to public health in 2019 by the World Health Organization and its prevalence is increasing.
- Area 51, also known as Dreamland and Paradise Ranch, is a U.S. Air Force base located within the Nevada Test and Training Range, about 120 miles northwest of Las Vegas. Originally created for the purposes of surveillance development, Area 51 has become a conspiracy topic. Many believe it to be a center for testing crashed alien spacecraft and a meeting center for extraterrestrials. Though such theories have been disproved and explained by the U.S. military, its real purpose is still unclear as it remains shrouded in secrecy.
- Barack Obama citizenship conspiracy theories: The term birther refers to someone who subscribes to the conspiracy theory that former President Barack Obama was not born in the United States. The false allegation was initially made in 2004 by Andy Martin, who claimed that Obama was a hidden Muslim rather than a Protestant Christian, as he publicly stated. The theory was amplified by Donald Trump in 2011 amid speculation about a presidential run, when he claimed that there was something wrong with Obama's birth certificate. Obama later publicly released his birth certificate, which showed that he was actually born in Honolulu, Hawaii.
- The Biden–Ukraine conspiracy theory stems from an April 2015 email to Hunter Biden from Vadym Pozharskyi, an adviser to a Ukrainian privately owned energy company, to thank Hunter Biden for inviting him to meet his father, Joe Biden, then the U.S. vice-president. Joe Biden has been accused of participating in corrupt activities involving Ukraine as well as influence-peddling to serve his son's career. Donald Trump and some of his conservative supporters pointed to that conspiracy theory in the hopes of derailing Biden's 2020 presidential campaign.
- COVID-19 misinformation: After the COVID-19 pandemic started in early 2020, false information regarding the virus's place of origin, treatment, diagnosis, etc. has been widely spread through social media, news outlets, and political biases. That caused an "infodemic," as dubbed by the World Health Organization. The numerous false claims regarding the treatment of the virus have caused harm on various fronts in the fight to subdue it.
- Deep state: The term deep state refers to the belief that hidden figures within U.S. power structures such as the CIA and the FBI control U.S. policy instead of the nation's elected officials.
- Death panel: First coined by former Alaska Governor and 2008 Republican vice-presidential candidate Sarah Palin, death panel refers to the politically charged theory that government healthcare will lead to government control and ultimately result in panels of politicians and doctors to decide the fates of America's elderly, disabled, and physically vulnerable. No change or implementation of policy then or since has factually proved any such claims to be true.
- False flags: The term false flag originated with pirate ships flying literal false flags with the colours of recognized nations to convince merchant ships into thinking that they were safe in interacting with them. Since then, the term has been adopted to describe an operation that is carried out by one nation or people and then attributed to another to deflect or hide blame. Documented false flag operations have been carried out by numerous nations in different eras of war. While some such instances have proved to be real, some attribute certain occurrences to the U.S. government under the guise of a false flag operation; an example is 9/11 conspiracy theories.

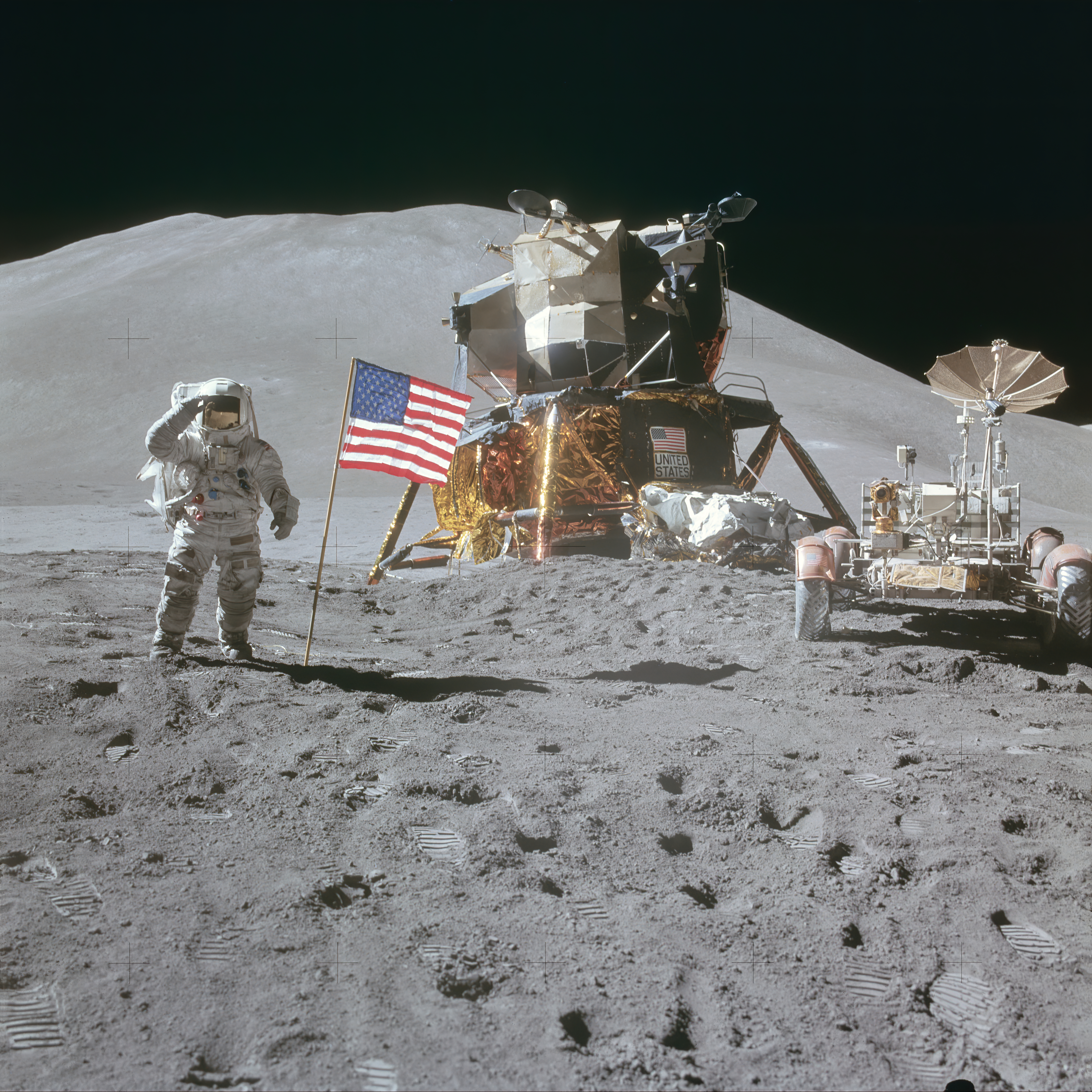
The Moon landing is one of the most commonly known conspiracy theories. It theorizes that the government staged the landing.

- FEMA camps conspiracy theory: The belief that the Federal Emergency Management Agency is preparing concentration camps around the United States to hold its citizens once martial law is declared. Such ideas first emerged in a 1982 newsletter sponsored by a far-right group that believed that the most patriotic citizens are most at risk to be imprisoned, tortured, and even killed. Conspiracy theories involving FEMA still persist in chatrooms and social media of today's ultraconservatives.
- Death of Jeffrey Epstein: Jeffrey Epstein was a convicted sex offender, sex trafficker, and financial broker. Shortly after his New York arrest and sentencing, he was taken and placed in the Metropolitan Correctional Center, in Lower Manhattan. On August 10, 2019, he was found in his cell with significant neck bruising. Unconscious and in cardiac arrest, Epstein was taken to the New York Downtown Hospital, where he was later pronounced dead by suicide. Epstein was well-connected among political, cultural, and fiscal elites and had friends and enemies in high places, so many believe that he did not take his own life. The conspiracy theories surrounding his death have attributed it to both the Clinton family and Donald Trump, supposedly motivated by information that Epstein might have had that would harm powerful figures. Multiple investigations have been launched by the Federal Bureau of Investigation and the Bureau of Prisons into the death of Epstein, but no definitive conclusion has been reached.
- John F. Kennedy assassination conspiracy theories: On November 22, 1963, U.S. President John F. Kennedy was shot in the head on a campaigning trip in Dallas, Texas. He died at 1:00 pm that afternoon at the Parkland Memorial Hospital. The conspiracy theories surrounding Kennedy's death have ranged from the involvement of the Cuban government to that of Vice President Lyndon B. Johnson.
- Malcolm X assassination: Malcolm X, a black nationalist leader and prominent member of the Nation of Islam (NOI), was assassinated on February 21, 1965, while he was giving a speech in Manhattan. His killer has yet to be identified, which fuels conspiracy theories surrounding his death. The most prominent theory is that his death was sponsored by the Nation of Islam, since he had a dispute with it. His family members are still actively searching for answers to his untimely death.
- Martin Luther King Jr. assassination conspiracy theories: On April 4, 1968, the civil rights activist and leader Martin Luther King Jr. was assassinated. There have been numerous conspiracy theories concerning his death, some even involving the U.S. government. The King family openly opposed the sentencing of the supposed assassin, James Earl Ray, and believes that King's death was caused by "mightier forces." His wife, Coretta Scott King, strongly maintained that his death was wrapped in "high-level conspiracy" that possibly involved the American Mafia and the U.S. government.
- Moon landing conspiracy theories: On July 20, 1969, the astronauts Neil Armstrong and Buzz Aldrin became the first human beings to set foot on the Moon. Over 530 million people watched one of the greatest human achievements occur. In the following years, some Americans came to believe that the entire event had been a very expensive hoax created by the U.S. government. Conspiracy theories regarding the Moon landing began and were popularized in the mid-1970s after numerous demonstrations of governmental dishonesty such as the Pentagon Papers and the Watergate scandal. Many of the claims of the Moon landing being faked have to do with various "errors" in the photographs and video taken during the event. One theory, based on the depiction of space in his 1968 film 2001: A Space Odyssey, is that the famed director Stanley Kubrick actually staged and filmed the Moon landing. Such claims have since been debunked by various experts but they continue to live in American cinema, popular culture, and websites.
- 1980 October Surprise theory: The term October surprise was coined by the Reagan administration during the tumultuous 1980 election. Minutes after the completion of Reagan's inaugural address, the Islamic Republic of Iran released the 66 Americans whom it had been holding hostage since November 4, 1979. The incredible timing of that release made many believe that the Reagan administration had worked out a deal with the Iranian government to hold off on releasing the hostages until after the inauguration. Since that incident, the term October surprise has been used to describe attention-grabbing information and events that occur in the final days prior to a presidential election, like Hillary Clinton being affected by WikiLeaks releasing her Wall Street speeches and Donald Trump being affected by a video coming out in which he brags about sexually assaulting women.
- Pizzagate conspiracy theory: A month before the 2016 presidential election, some far-right followers of Donald Trump used a Reddit forum and 4chan message board to pore through a hacked email account of John Podesta, Hillary Clinton's former campaign chairman, in search of a potential scandal. What they found was correspondence about a dinner between Podesta and his brother, with language involving pizza. The conservative devotees connected the phrase cheese pizza with c.p. for child pornography, an abbreviation often used in pedophile chatrooms. The connection between Podesta and James Alefantis, the owner of Comet Ping Pong, a Washington, DC, pizza restaurant, quickly led internet users to start conspiracy theories about a child sex trafficking ring involving Hillary Clinton, Barack Obama, and other high-profile Democrats. Other theories involved underground tunnels, kill rooms, Satanism, and even cannibalism. On December 4, 2016, a 28-year-old man, Edgar M. Welch, drove from North Carolina with a military-style gun in the hope of freeing the child sex slaves he supposed were being held captive in the Washington restaurant. He was quickly apprehended and arrested after he had fired a shot but injured no one. The restaurant was searched, and evidence of such a sex trafficking ring was not found, but Pizzagate theories still persist on social media.
- QAnon is a conspiracy theory created by far-right devotees of Donald Trump. QAnon followers believe that the western world is being run by a group of elite "deep state" Satan-worshipping pedophiles and that it is Trump's charge to defeat them, which he will supposedly do on a day dubbed "The Storm". The term QAnon stemmed from an anonymous 4chan user "Q," who claimed to be a government insider with high-level "Q" clearance and special information involving the Trump administration. Millions now subscribe to the QAnon theory including some politicians, celebrities, and many others.
- Sandy Hook Elementary School shooting conspiracy theories: On December 14, 2012, a man named Adam Lanza shot and killed his own mother as well as 20 Sandy Hook Elementary School students, six staff members, and then himself. Almost immediately after the tragedy, conspiracy theories started to circulate about the cause of the attack. Fueled by far-right conspiracy theorists like Alex Jones, many subscribed to the idea that the entire event had been orchestrated by the U.S. government to promote the enforcement and strengthening of gun laws. After he was sued by many of the victims' parents, Jones retracted his previous statements. Such conspiracy theories, though disputed, continue to harm the Sandy Hook victims. Jones was later successfully sued for defamation by the victims.
- Stop the Steal: A far-right conspiracy theory that alleges the 2020 U.S. presidential election was rigged to support the election of Joe Biden. It falsely claims that there was widespread voter fraud to stop Donald Trump from winning reelection such as rigged voting machines and millions of votes being cast fraudulently. Having been promoted by Trump as well as many of his allies, these beliefs led to attempts to overturn the 2020 election and the January 6th Capitol attack.
- Illuminati: The Illuminati, also known as the New World Order, is the supposed group of elites that secretly controls the entire world. The term was at first the name of a free thought group for secularist thinkers in Bavaria. It was eventually shut down by the Catholic Church, but many believe that it merely went into hiding and that it eventually evolved into today's New World Order. Supporters of such conspiracy theories believe that certain symbols often used in American imagery are secret communication used by the Illuminati like the Eye of Horus on the U.S. dollar. Another belief is that specific celebrities (Beyoncé, Jay-Z, Eminem, etc.) have been killed and replaced with clones to brainwash society. None of those claims are grounded in fact, but the Illuminati conspiracy theory has continued to be one of the most popular ones in America.
- Trump-Ukraine affiliations: The Trump-Ukraine conspiracy theory refers to Trump and associates attributing voter fraud in the 2016 U.S. presidential election to Ukraine rather than Russia contrary to evidence from various historically reliable sources. In conjunction with those theories are accusations against Joe Biden and his son, Hunter Biden, in affiliation with Ukraine. In August 2019, a CIA officer-turned-whistleblower filed a complaint that Trump was soliciting for foreign electoral intervention in the 2020 U.S. presidential election. A formal inquiry was then made by the U.S. House of Representatives, and Trump was later impeached and put on trial. No evidence of Ukrainian interference in the 2016 election was found. Trump was acquitted.
- 9/11 conspiracy theories: On September 11, 2001, almost 3,000 Americans died in the wake of terrorist attacks on the World Trade Center and The Pentagon. Four commercial planes were hijacked by Islamic extremists, crashed into the Pentagon, a Pennsylvania field, and the Twin Towers, which changed New York City's skyline forever. Shortly after that tragic event, conspiracy theories formed and spread. Many believe that al-Qaeda was not entirely to blame for the attacks and that the U.S. government was partly responsible by not acting on advanced information that it had received regarding the attacks. One of the most popular theories is that the plane crashes were used to cover up controlled demolitions inside the buildings.

== Historical conspiracy theories ==
=== Colonial era ===
With slavery operational in all the colonies, owners often showed anxiety about slave conspiracies that drew on older English fears about Catholic political plots in the sixteenth and seventeenth centuries. However actual slave revolts were not politically motivated and typically bore little resemblance to the highly structured plots that those involved in these trades believed they would be. Settlers on the frontier often connected isolated incidents to indicate Indian conspiracies to attack them, but these lacked a French diplomatic dimension after 1763, or a Spanish connection after 1820.

=== American Revolution ===
Thomas Hutchinson, the royal governor of Massachusetts, was a leader of the forces loyal to the King and focused his attention on uncovering Patriot conspiracies by the likes of James Otis Jr. and Samuel Adams. The Patriot cause through speeches, pamphlets and newspapers presented a well-developed hyperbolic rhetoric focused on the conspiracy of Parliament to deny Americans the rights of Englishmen.

In 1783, after the war ended, unpaid officers met with General George Washington and asked him to force Congress to satisfy their demands. Washington squelched the threat, which historians have called the Newburgh Conspiracy. According to a reviewer of A Crisis of Peace: George Washington, the Newburgh Conspiracy, and the Fate of the American Revolution, (2019) by David Head, the book:

casts doubt on the existence of any conspiracy, at least in the sense of an organized challenge to Washington's command of the army. Head believes the appearance of conspiracy was the product of gossip and private conversations among officers and members of Congress intent on using the officers' demands to promote a stronger national government. If Head discounts the conspiracy of legend, he makes clear that the disputes over officers' pay and pensions threatened the legitimacy of the Confederation Congress and the balance of state and federal power, and that Washington sought to protect both.

=== 19th century ===
==== Freemasons and Anti-Masons ====
The Freemasons are a secret fraternal society. In the 1820s it became a target of politicians who denounced it as a conspiracy to control politics, and alleged it murdered an opponent. In 1826, William Morgan disappeared from Batavia, New York, after threatening to expose Freemasonry's secrets, causing some to claim that he had been murdered by Masons. What exactly occurred has never been conclusively proven. However, Morgan's disappearance – and the minimal punishment received by his kidnappers – sparked a series of protests against Freemasons throughout the United States, especially in New York and neighboring states. The protracted backlash led to many masons quitting.

Under the leadership of Thurlow Weed, an anti-Masonic and anti-Andrew Jackson (Jackson was a Mason) movement grew to become the Anti-Masonic Party and made the ballot for the presidency in 1828 while gaining the support of such notable politicians as William H. Seward. Its influence was such that other Jackson rivals, including John Quincy Adams, denounced the Masons. In 1847, Adams wrote a widely distributed book titled Letters on the Masonic Institution that was highly critical of the Masons. In 1832, the party fielded William Wirt as its presidential candidate. Wirt was secretly a Freemason, and even gave a speech at the Anti-Masonic convention defending the organization. The party even received seven electoral votes. Three years later, the party had disbanded in every state save Pennsylvania. Most activists joined the new and more mainstream Whig Party.

==== Slave Power conspiracy ====
A main theme of the antislavery and abolitionists movements was that the Southern slave owners had combined to exercise a dominant control over national policy. They largely controlled the White House, the nation's foreign policy, the Supreme Court and the westward expansion. Historians have examined the claims and agree that although there were some exaggerations, the Slave Power was real. The new Republican Party formed in 1854 in reaction to the repeal of the anti-slavery provisions of the Missouri Compromise of 1820, thereby allowing slavery into Kansas and Nebraska territories. Thus by 1854 for the first time a major party was built around the principle that slavery cannot be allowed to expand into fresh lands—a program that won majority support among the voters of the North by the late 1850s, along with almost no support in the South.

The term Slave Power thus referred to the supposed political power held by American slaveowners before 1860. Historian David Blight states, "The idea of a Slave Power conspiracy was at least as old as the 1820s, but in the 1850s it became the staple of antislavery rhetoric. [Frederick] Douglass plied these waters before the Republicans made it their own." Antislavery campaigners, led by Frederick Douglass bitterly decried what they saw as disproportionate and corrupt influence wielded by wealthy Southerners. The argument was that this small group of wealthy enslavers had seized political control of their states and were trying to take over the federal government illegitimately to expand and protect slavery. At the time antislavery speakers said the Slave Power caused the War with Mexico, but historians point out that President Polk and the expansionist Democrats were not concerned with slavery but with California. Whig pro-slavery spokesmen opposed the war.

The term was popularized by antislavery writers such as Frederick Douglass, John Gorham Palfrey, Josiah Quincy III, Horace Bushnell, James Shepherd Pike, and Horace Greeley. Politicians who emphasized the theme included John Quincy Adams, Henry Wilson and William Pitt Fessenden. Abraham Lincoln used the concept after 1854, but not the term. Through a combination of passionate argument and hard statistical data, they showed that the South had long held a disproportionate level of power in the United States.

=== 20th century ===
- First Red Scare, 1919
- Pearl Harbor advance-knowledge conspiracy theory
- Second Red Scare, also known as McCarthyism, 1950s
- John F. Kennedy assassination conspiracy theories
- Malcolm X assassination conspiracy theories
- Martin Luther King Jr. assassination conspiracy theories
- Robert F. Kennedy assassination conspiracy theories
- New World Order (conspiracy theory)
- Clinton body count conspiracy theory

=== 21st century ===
- 9/11 conspiracy theories
- Saddam Hussein and al-Qaeda link allegations
- Barack Obama citizenship conspiracy theories
- Barack Obama religion conspiracy theories
- Deep state conspiracy theory in the United States
- Great Replacement conspiracy theory in the United States
- QAnon
- Dark Enlightenment
- Russia investigation origins conspiracy theory
- Stop the steal, election denial by Donald Trump and the MAGA movement
- Vaccines and autism
- Charlie Kirk assassination conspiracy theories

== See also ==
- Among the Truthers: A Journey Through America's Growing Conspiracist Underground
  - Ancient Aliens
- History of homeland security in the United States
- List of conspiracy theories, worldwide
  - Ancient astronauts
- List of conspiracy theories promoted by Donald Trump
- Post-truth politics
- The Paranoid Style in American Politics, 1964 essay by Richard Hofstadter
- Xenophobia in the United States
  - Christian fundamentalism and conspiracy theories
- Wingnut (politics)

== Sources ==
Richards, Leonard L. (2000). The Slave Power: The Free North and Southern Domination 1780–1860. Baton Rouge: Louisiana State University Press. ISBN 978-0-8071-2537-3.
