= Ukrainian conspiracy theories in US politics =

Conspiracy theories alleging Ukrainian interference in US politics include:

- Conspiracy theories related to the Trump–Ukraine scandal
- Biden–Ukraine conspiracy theory
- Russia investigation origins conspiracy theory
