= List of conspiracy theories promoted by Donald Trump =

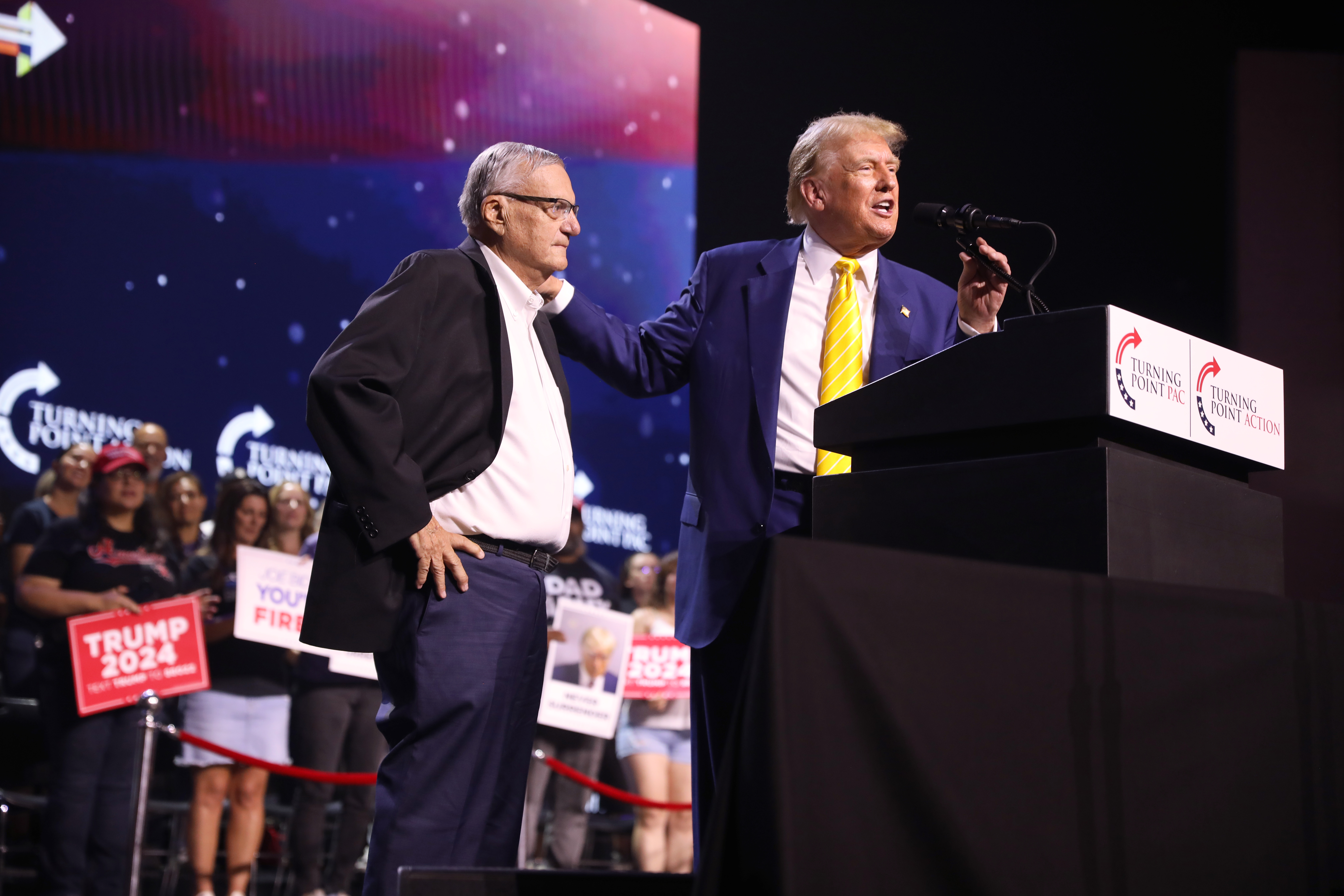
Trump with Sheriff Joe Arpaio, a prominent supporter of the "birther" conspiracy theory falsely alleging that President Barack Obama was not born in the United States

Donald Trump, the 45th and 47th president of the United States, has created or promoted many deceptive or disproven conspiracy theories, to a degree unprecedented in American politics.

== Conspiracy theories ==
=== Attacks on political opponents ===
==== Barack and Michelle Obama ====
- Conspiracy theories about the citizenship of Barack Obama, aka "Birtherism", later retracted
- Theory that Bill Ayers wrote Obama's memoir Dreams from My Father
- False claims of fraud in the 2012 election
- Pushed conspiracy theory that Obama supported ISIS
- Claim that Obama secretly controlled the Biden administration
- False accusation that Obama and other officials committed "treason" against him
- Shared a video from Alex Jones that had a caption claiming that “Michelle Obama may have used Biden’s autopen in the final days of his administration to pardon key individuals”.

==== Bill and Hillary Clinton ====
- False accusation that Hillary Clinton started the birther conspiracy theory
- Clinton body count conspiracy theory
- Retweeted the false accusation that Jeffrey Epstein's death was arranged by Bill Clinton.
- Said at CPAC on February 27, 2015, when asked about his thoughts about Bill Clinton: "Nice guy, got a lot of problems coming up in my opinion with the famous island with Jeffrey Epstein, a lot of problems." ^{(Remarks start at 22:50)}
- Support of the Pizzagate conspiracy theory and portrayals of the Clintons as pedophiles
- Suicide of Vince Foster
- Murder of Seth Rich
- Claimed that Hillary Clinton gave uranium rights to Russia in exchange for donations to the Clinton Foundation
- Claimed that Hillary Clinton "meets in secret with international banks to plot the destruction of U.S. sovereignty"
- Clinton plan intelligence conspiracy theory claims that Hillary Clinton made false claims connecting Trump to Russian interference.

==== Ted Cruz ====
- Assassination of John F. Kennedy – alleged Rafael Cruz, the father of Texas Senator and Republican presidential candidate for the 2016 elections Ted Cruz, had ties to Lee Harvey Oswald. Trump later stated that he did not actually believe the story.

==== Joe and Hunter Biden ====
- Biden–Ukraine conspiracy theory
- Osama bin Laden death conspiracy theories, explicitly claiming Biden and Obama staged killing with body double, and may have had SEAL Team 6 killed
- Hunter Biden laptop controversy and China business dealings conspiracy theory
- Hunter Biden cocaine conspiracy theory, specifically relating to the cocaine found in the White House in July 2023
- Baseless accusation that Joe Biden is being controlled by "People that you've never heard of, people that are in the dark shadows."
- False accusation that the Biden administration had been ready to kill him during the FBI search of Mar-a-Lago
- False accusation that disaster relief agency FEMA spent money on housing illegal immigrants, leaving it unable to fund hurricane disaster response.
- Claimed that the Biden administration directed federal agencies to bribe news organizations for positive coverage
- Shared a post that Biden was executed in 2020 and replaced by a robotic clone
- Claimed that the Epstein files are falsified documents created by his political opponents, such as the Biden administration.

==== Kamala Harris ====
- Harris citizenship conspiracy theories
- Accused Harris of paying celebrities for endorsements, including Bruce Springsteen, Oprah Winfrey, and Bono, falsely claiming that $11 million was paid to Beyoncé

==== Joe Scarborough ====
- Joe Scarborough conspiracy theory

==== Others ====
- Claimed that Canadian prime minister Justin Trudeau was secretly the son of Cuban leader Fidel Castro
- Posted a screenshot of a story claiming that Nikki Haley was disqualified from being president
- Spread false conspiracy theories about the attack on Paul Pelosi, suggesting it could have been staged
- Suggested that Ruth Bader Ginsburg's dying wish may have been manufactured by the Democratic political leadership in Congress
- Claimed that the United States House Select Committee on the January 6 Attack had "deleted and destroyed all the evidence"
- Said that James Comey "was calling for the assassination of the president" when he posted an image of seashells spelling "86 47"
- Reposted a false claim on Truth Social asserting that Tim Walz was connected to the 2025 shootings of Minnesota legislators.
- Suggested that Ilhan Omar staged a syringe spraying attack in a town hall meeting, saying "she probably had herself sprayed, knowing her".

=== Claims about clandestine opposition ===
==== Deep State ====
- Claims of a "deep state" conspiracy resisting Trump administration objectives and proper prosecution of Trump foes

==== QAnon ====
- Expressions of support for QAnon adherents

==== Antifa ====
- Claiming those resisting authoritarianism and fascism in the USA are led by an organization identified as "Antifa", an abbreviation for anti-fascism
- Attribution of Buffalo police shoving incident to antifa
- Claimed that a plane full of "thugs in dark uniforms", implying antifa, had recently flown from one unidentified city to another with the intention of fomenting riots

==== Anarchists ====
- Retweeted a One America News Network tweet that ongoing George Floyd protests constituted a "coup attempt" that was "led by a well funded network of anarchists".

=== Russian interference, Robert Mueller investigation deflections ===
- Allegations of Obama spying on Trump, including Spygate and Trump Tower wiretapping allegations
- Allegations of Hillary Clinton spying on Trump
- Russiagate hoax. Trump and his defenders have used terms like "Russia hoax", "Russian collusion hoax", and "Russiagate hoax" to delegitimize accusations and investigations of alleged impropriety, cooperation, collusion, or conspiracy between the Trump campaign and the government, officials, and intelligence agencies of Russia. They assert that such accusations are a hoax perpetrated against Trump by his critics and that he is the victim of a witch hunt. Trump and his supporters have produced no evidence of such a hoax.

The "hoax" accusation has been debunked by numerous sources and is contradicted by investigative findings of what "the president, members of his campaign and his associates actually did".

- Pursued the theory that Ukraine, rather than Russia, interfered in the 2016 election

=== 2016, 2020, 2024 and 2026 election claims ===
To sow election doubt, Trump escalated the use of "rigged election" and "election interference" statements in advance of the 2024 election compared to the previous two elections—the statements described as part of a "heads I win; tails you cheated" rhetorical strategy.

Through early October 2026, Trump had attacked the integrity of US elections on more than 70% of the days following his 2025 inauguration, repeatedly making false claims.

- Voter conspiracy theories, repeatedly since 2016
- Claimed he won the popular vote during the 2016 presidential election, saying "I think there was tremendous cheating in California, there was tremendous cheating in New York and other places".
- Claimed that Google manipulated votes in the 2016 election
- Cited an unverified report that between three and five million non-citizens voted in the 2016 elections
- Claimed that videos produced by James O'Keefe proved Hillary Clinton and Barack Obama had "hired people" and "paid them $1,500" to "be violent, cause fights, [and] do bad things" at Trump rallies.
- Tweeted that Google results were "RIGGED" against him, 2018.
- Trump's false claim of a stolen election, 2020; Stop the Steal and other attempts to overturn the 2020 United States presidential election
- Italygate, 2020
- Tweeted about a conspiracy theory that voting machines made by Dominion Voting Systems had deleted millions of Trump votes.
- Referred to the first release of the Twitter Files, 2022, as proof of "Big Tech companies, the DNC, & the Democrat Party" rigging the 2020 United States presidential election against him, declaring that "the termination of all rules, regulations, and articles, even those found in the Constitution" was necessary.
- Claimed that the 2026 California primary elections were rigged.
- Joked that if the U.S. lost to Belgium without Balogun, he would say the World Cup match was rigged, just like the 2020 election was rigged.
- Questioned the integrity of the 2026 United States elections

=== Claims of corrupt science, medicine, and statistics ===
- Claimed COVID-19 deaths systematically overcounted
- Allegations of collusion between Anthony Fauci and the pharmaceutical industry
- Claims that Bill Gates and Anthony Fauci profited from COVID-19 vaccinations
- Global warming conspiracy theory, claimed that "The concept of global warming was created by and for the Chinese in order to make U.S. manufacturing non-competitive."
- Hurricane Maria death toll controversy
- Claimed Mob responsible for movement against asbestos
- Frequent claims that Vaccines cause autism: tweeted "Healthy young child goes to doctor, gets pumped with massive shot of many vaccines, doesn't feel good and changes - AUTISM. Many such cases!" Tweeted, "I am being proven right about massive vaccinations—the doctors lied. Save our children & their future" and that parents "know far better than fudged-up reports." At Republican debate, claimed "Just the other day, two years old, 2½ years old, a child, a beautiful child went to have the vaccine, and came back, and a week later got a tremendous fever, got very, very sick, now is autistic."
- Claimed that wind turbines cause cancer
- Accused Erika McEntarfer of rigging labor statistics for political reasons to make him look bad, and had her fired.

=== Claims about national, ethnic, religious or racial groups ===
- Great replacement conspiracy theory, alleging that non-white immigrants from Latin America are seeking to displace American citizens in areas of employment, housing, and education.
- Tweeted infographic falsely stating that whites killed by blacks constitute 81% of crime, citing the nonexistent "Crime Statistics Bureau — San Francisco"
- Alleged actions by Muslims as claimed by Britain First
- Claimed to have witnessed Muslims in Jersey City cheering the 9/11 terrorist attack
- Syrian refugee as ISIS members conspiracy
- Mexican government forces criminals across border
- White genocide conspiracy theory
- Haitian immigrants in Springfield, Ohio eating cats and dogs
- Claimed that ISIS members were hiding within the Central American migrant caravans

=== Claims of paid protesters ===
- Suggested violent protesters were being funded by "some very stupid rich people"
- Alleging that antifa activists were being funded by Democrats, George Soros or "other people".
- Claimed that protesters against his crackdown in Washington D.C. were paid by the Democrats
- Accused California Governor Gavin Newsom and Los Angeles Mayor Karen Bass of paying protesters in Los Angeles.
- Repeated a claim that Renée Good was part of a “left-wing network” of paid agitators trying “to incite violence” against ICE and federal agents in Minneapolis.
- Accused protesters outside the Delaney Hall private prison of being paid protesters, saying "These aren’t protesters. These people are fake."

=== Claims about George Soros ===
- That Soros was backing the protests against Kavanaugh's Supreme Court nomination.
- That Soros funded the Central American migrant caravans heading toward the United States.
- That district attorney Alvin Bragg was "bought and paid for" by Soros.

=== Questioning terrorism ===
- 9/11 conspiracy theories
- Negationism regarding the January 6 Capitol attack
- Claim that Hamas terrorists are "pouring into our once beautiful USA, through our TOTALLY OPEN SOUTHERN BORDER"
- Claimed that the FBI had planted 274 agents in the January 6 crowd and implied they helped provoke the attack on the Capitol.

=== Other ===
- Referenced a conspiracy theory about Antonin Scalia's death, saying "they say they found a pillow on his face, which is a pretty unusual place to find a pillow."
- Claimed that the FBI knows the identity of the individual who placed two pipe bombs outside the DNC and RNC on January 6th.
- Claimed that Venezuelan President Nicolás Maduro controls Tren de Aragua, which Trump says is invading the U.S.
- Cast doubt on whether the U.S. gold reserves were still at Fort Knox.
- Alluded to the conspiracy theory that Imran Awan was hiding “missing” DNC servers in the middle of remarks about Russian election interference, asking “What happened to the servers of the Pakistani gentleman that worked on the DNC? Where are those servers?”
- Shared and then deleted an apparently AI-generated video, starring himself, promoting “medbeds”, a pseudoscientific medical device popularised by QAnon.
- Accused the Supreme Court of being influenced by "foreign interests" after the Court ruled against him on tariff powers.
- After an escalator in the United Nations General Assembly Building stopped as he and Melania Trump were stepping onto it, Trump demanded an investigation alleging sabotage and called for the arrest of those responsible for the escalator incident.

== Conspiracy theorists endorsed by Trump ==
Donald Trump has encouraged individuals who spread conspiracy theories.

- Had dinner with Kanye West after he had promoted antisemitic conspiracy theories and had vowed to go "death [sic] con 3 On JEWISH PEOPLE" on his Twitter account. His dinner guest was Nick Fuentes, a well-known Holocaust denier.
- Alex Jones, publisher of Infowars, a climate change denialist who has said that the World Bank invented the "hoax" of climate change, falsely claims that vaccines cause autism and who encouraged his listeners to harass the victims of the Sandy Hook elementary school shooting, which he called a "hoax". Trump appeared on Infowars, where he praised Jones's "amazing reputation", and repeated Jones's claims on the campaign trail.
  - Paul Joseph Watson, who worked for Alex Jones' Infowars and whose conspiracy theory interests include chemtrails, the New World Order and the Illuminati.
- Laura Loomer, who has made false claims about several U.S. mass shootings, including that they were affiliated with ISIS or that the shootings were entirely staged
- Jack Posobiec, known for promoting the Pizzagate conspiracy theory.
- Sidney Powell, an attorney who joined the Trump legal team in 2020, although the team distanced itself from her after she publicly claimed that the 2020 election had been rigged by an elaborate international communist plot. She filed and lost four federal cases, alleging voter fraud of "biblical" proportions and claiming that voting machines had been secretly programmed to switch votes from Trump to Biden.
- Rudy Giuliani, the former Mayor of New York City during the September 11 attacks, best known in more recent years for his role as Donald Trump's attorney in various lawsuits pertaining to and a leading proponent of conspiracy theories about the 2020 presidential election, such as that between 65,000 and 165,000 ballots in Georgia were illegally cast by underage voters, that between 32,000 and "a few hundred thousand" illegal immigrants voted in Arizona, and that from 8,021 to 30,000 votes in Pennsylvania were cast fraudulently by people voting in the names of deceased persons whose names had yet to be purged from voter rolls.
- L. Lin Wood, an attorney who promoted conspiracy theories about the 2020 presidential election, claiming that Trump had won the election with 70% of the vote, and that a secret cabal of international communists, Chinese intelligence, and Republican officials had contrived to steal the election from Trump. Wood also claims that "no planes" hit the World Trade Center and Pentagon on September 11, 2001, and that planes visible in the footage are "CGI". He announced that he had "entered the public debate around the 'flat earth' issue", endorsing the belief that it is flat.
- Kelly Townsend, an Arizona Senator sought out Trump in 2011 pushing the Obama birther conspiracy. Townsend along with Roger Stone associate Jerome Corsi, Sheriff Joe Arpaio, and 2020 Maricopa County Sheriff candidate and then chief Arpaio staffer Jerry Sheridan, worked with informant Dennis Montgomery. In 2020, Townsend worked again with Jerome Corsi claiming the election was stolen from Donald Trump and emailed Corsi a document of Arizona Senators endorsing Trump electors for Vice President Pence, in an attempt to overturn the 2020 election. In November 2020, Townsend assisted Sidney Powell along with her birther conspiracy associate Dennis Montgomery who back in 2011 alleged Hammer and Scorecard was spying and used to hack into government computers and change Obama's birth certificate, and in 2020 with Townsend and Powell shifted his claims stating the supercomputer was being used to hack and flip votes in favor of Biden in 2020, and Townsend was listed as a key witness in Powell's Arizona election fraud case. In the lead up to January 6, 2021, Townsend sponsored a bill that would designate Trump electors to Arizona and promoted the Arizona audit and stolen election claims. Townsend has also been a leader of the anti-vax movement, claiming in 2019 that all vaccines are communist.
- Rick Wiles, founder of TruNews was granted press credentials by the Trump administration. Wiles is known for pushing homophobic and antisemitic conspiracy theories, including that the Jews seek to take control of the United States to "kill millions of Christians" and stated, "9/11 wasn't done by the Muslims. It was done by a wildcard, the Israeli Mossad, that's cunning and ruthless and can carry out attacks on Americans and make it look like Arabs did it." In July 2018, during the Trump administration, he claimed that Anderson Cooper and Rachel Maddow were going to lead a "homosexual coup on the White House" that would result in the nationally televised decapitation of the Trump family on the White House lawn.
- Roger Stone, long-term political advisor to Donald Trump. Suggested Seth Rich’s parents were paid off to avoid pursuing an investigation into his murder. Posted a screenshot from Laura Loomer and claimed that Nikki Haley was "Constitutionally ineligible to be President". Pardoned by Trump in connection with the Mueller investigation.
- Michael Flynn, retired U.S. Army lieutenant general and former National Security Advisor to Trump. Pledged an oath to the QAnon movement. Asserted the COVID-19 pandemic was fabricated as "a distraction to what happened on 3 November," referring to the 2020 presidential election which he maintains was stolen.
- Marjorie Taylor Greene, member of the United States House of Representatives. Supported the QAnon conspiracy theory. Promoted the theory that the Sandy Hook Elementary School shooting was staged.
- Tucker Carlson, political commentator. Promoted "the Great Replacement" conspiracy theory, that Democrats are importing immigrants to replace the current electorate with more "obedient" voters. Alleged that the January 6th Capitol attack was a "false flag" FBI operation.
- Donald Trump Jr., businessman, political activist and eldest child of Donald Trump. During the 2020 presidential election he called for "total war" as the results were counted. Amplified Russian propaganda which claimed that the US and Ukraine were developing biological weapons.
- Lou Dobbs, political commentator, author, and television host. Gave air time to birtherism theories as early as 2009. One of three Fox Corporation program hosts named in a $2.7 billion defamation lawsuit by Smartmatic. Supported the claim that Dominion’s machines were rigged to switch votes from Trump to Biden.
- Candace Owens, commentator and political activist. Endorsed the conspiracy theory that Brigitte Macron, wife of French President Emmanuel Macron, was secretly transgender. Claimed on Twitter that the gunman involved in the Robb Elementary School shooting could be transgender and said that he was "cross-dressing".
- Mike Lindell, businessman and political activist. Directed and starred in Absolute Proof, in which he claimed that hackers infiltrated local election office computer systems to alter vote counts — which he calls the “largest cyber-crime in global history.”
- Christina Bobb, lawyer, television personality and Republican Party official. Named in a $1.6 billion defamation lawsuit by Dominion Voting Systems against OANN. Promoted the 2021 Maricopa County presidential ballot audit. Said during a podcast that she believed the political left sought to "normalize pedophilia."
- Dinesh D'Souza, political commentator, author, and filmmaker. Produced the film "2000 Mules”, which claims that 2,000 “mules” illegally collected and delivered 400,000 mail ballots to drop boxes across several key swing states during the 2020 presidential election.
- Rush Limbaugh, radio talk show host. Suggested that the October 2018 United States mail bombing attempts were likely a false flag operation carried out by a "Democratic operative". Suggested that the Christchurch mosque shootings of March 2019 may have been a false-flag attack.

=== Conspiracy theorists in the second Trump administration ===
- Donald Trump, President of the United States
- Kash Patel, Director of the Federal Bureau of Investigation
- Robert F. Kennedy Jr., Secretary of Health and Human Services
- Peter Navarro, senior counselor for trade and manufacturing
- Devin Nunes, Chair of the President's Intelligence Advisory Board
- Joe Kent, Director of the National Counterterrorism Center (resigned )
- Gregg Phillips, Director of the Office of Response and Recovery
- Laura Loomer, informal advisor to President Trump
- Kurt Olsen, Director of Election Security and Integrity
- Tulsi Gabbard, Director of National Intelligence

== See also ==
- Conspiracy theories in United States politics (in 2016, in 2020, in 2024)
  - False or misleading statements by Donald Trump
    - Election denial movement in the United States (in 2016, in 2020, in 2024)
      - 2000 Mules
      - Absolute Proof
  - Post-truth politics
- Rhetoric of Donald Trump
