= Justin Trudeau–Fidel Castro conspiracy theory =

Conspiracy theory on Prime Minister of Canada

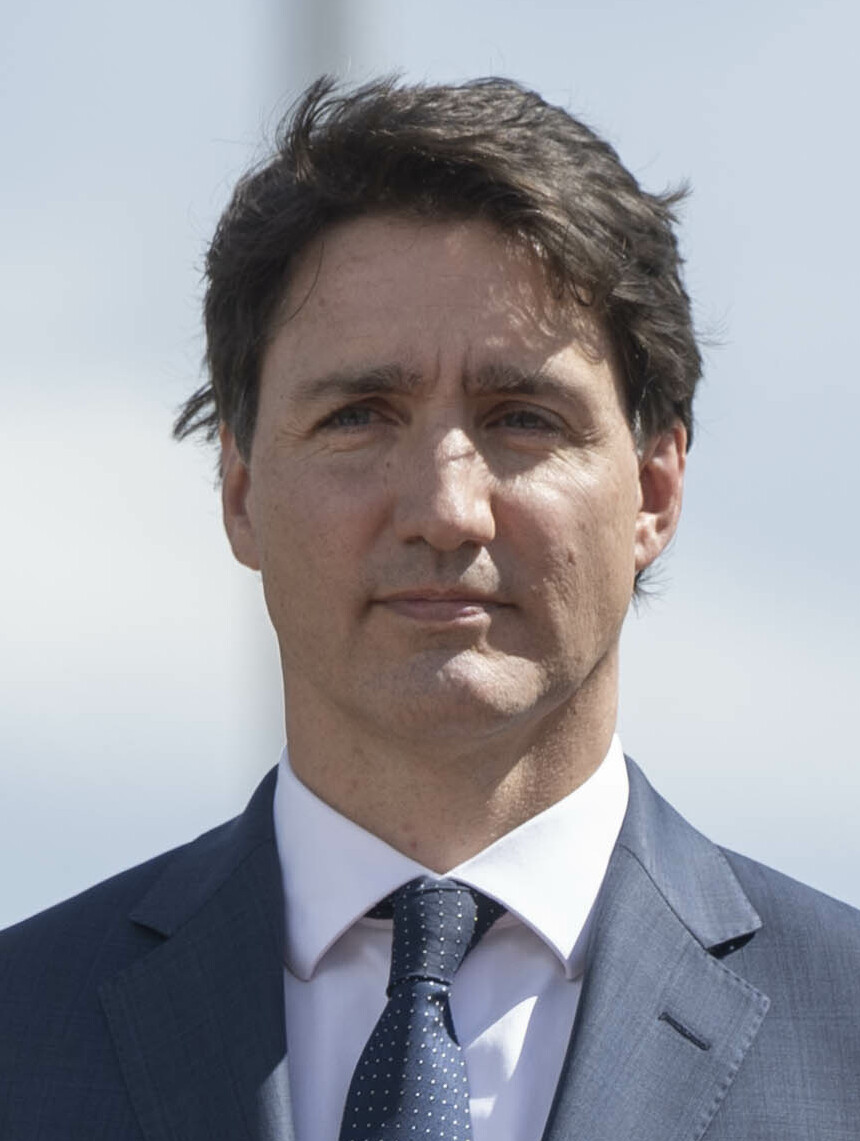
Justin Trudeau (2018)

Fidel Castro (c. 1950s)

During his premiership as Prime Minister of Canada, a conspiracy theory emerged that Justin Trudeau is secretly the biological son of Cuban leader Fidel Castro. This claim has been promoted by Donald Trump and by several fake news websites. Conspiracy theorists cite alleged similarities in appearance between Trudeau and Castro, as well as the fact that Trudeau's mother (wife of prime minister Pierre Trudeau), visited Cuba several times. However, the Trudeaus did not make their first official visit until 1976, five years after Justin was born in 1971.

== Origin ==
Following Fidel Castro's death in November 2016, Justin Trudeau's office released a statement on the matter which stated that Castro was a "controversial figure" and that "both Mr. Castro's supporters and detractors recognized his tremendous dedication and love for the Cuban people who had a deep and lasting affection for [Castro]". This was criticized by conservatives for being too supportive of Castro. On conservative, pro-Trump online platforms, such as the Reddit community r/The_Donald, this criticism evolved into conspiracy theories alleging that the two were related.

== Further spread ==
The conspiracy theory gained further attention during the 2022 Canada convoy protest against the Trudeau administration's COVID-19 policies. In a 2024 interview with livestreamer Adin Ross, Donald Trump said that the conspiracy theory "could be" accurate because "anything [is] possible in this world".

In a 2026 interview with Katie Pavlich for the news channel NewsNation, Alina Fernández, Castro's estranged daughter, was asked about the conspiracy theory. She responded, "The only thing I can say is that his mother used to visit the country very often." This led to a renewal in the conspiracy theory from tabloid outlets.

== Evidence contradicting the conspiracy theory ==
There is significant evidence against the theory, including documentation that Pierre and Margaret Trudeau did not visit Cuba in the period when Justin Trudeau could have been conceived (c. March–April 1971), and that they first visited the island after Justin was born. Additionally, the Trudeau family was subject to a large amount of media attention during Pierre's premiership, and therefore it is not likely that the family could have visited Cuba in secret.
