= Mike Lofgren =

American writer

Mike Lofgren is an American author and a former Republican U.S. Congressional aide. He retired in May 2011 after 28 years as a Congressional staff member. His writings, critical of politics in the United States, particularly the Republican Party, were published after his retirement and garnered widespread attention.

== Personal life ==
Lofgren has a B.A. and M.A. in history from the University of Akron. He was awarded a Fulbright Scholarship to study European history at the University of Bern and the University of Basel in Switzerland. He also completed the strategy and policy curriculum at the Naval War College.

== Political career ==
Lofgren began his legislative career as a military legislative assistant to then-Representative John Kasich in 1983. In 1994, he was a professional staff member of the Readiness Subcommittee of the House Armed Services Committee.

From 1995 to 2004, he was budget analyst for national security on the majority staff of the House Budget Committee. From 2005 until his retirement in 2011, Lofgren was the chief analyst for military spending on the Senate Budget Committee.

Since his retirement, Lofgren has written about politics, budgets, and national security issues. His work has appeared in the Los Angeles Times, Washington Monthly, Truthout, and CounterPunch.

== Writings ==
In September 2011, Lofgren published an essay on the website Truthout, entitled Goodbye to All That: Reflections of a GOP Operative Who Left the Cult. In it he explains why he retired when he did, writing that he was "appalled at the headlong rush of Republicans to embrace policies that are deeply damaging to this country’s future; and contemptuous of the feckless, craven incompetence of Democrats in their half-hearted attempts to stop them." He charged that both major American political parties are "rotten captives to corporate loot," but that while Democrats are merely weak and out of touch, the Republican Party is "becoming more like an apocalyptic cult." He particularly described Republicans as caring exclusively about their rich donors; being psychologically predisposed toward war; and pandering to the anti-intellectual, science-hostile, religious fundamentalist fringe. Lofgren wrote that the Tea Party is "filled with lunatics" and that lawmakers used the "routine" vote to raise the debt limit, which Congress has done 87 times since the end of World War II, to create "an entirely artificial fiscal crisis." The essay received widespread media attention because of Lofgren's status as a long-term, respected Republican civil servant. Truthout reported the piece received "over a million views."

Mike Lofgren first used the term Deep State in an essay, referring to a "web of entrenched interests in the US government and beyond (most notably Wall Street and Silicon Valley, which controls access to our every click and swipe) that dictate America’s defense decisions, trade policies and priorities with little regard for the actual interests or desires of the American people."

Lofgren called the reaction to his essay "bewildering," saying he wrote it not to settle scores but because he felt he had a uniquely privileged view of the machinery of government that Americans deserved to know about. He added that he had had "a good career" and no personal problems on Capitol Hill.

In 2012, Lofgren published the book The Party Is Over: How Republicans Went Crazy, Democrats Became Useless and the Middle Class Got Shafted, receiving a starred review from Booklist, which described the book as a "pungent, penetrating insider polemic." The Washington Post called it "forceful, hard-hitting and seductive." "I wrote the book," he said in a 2012 bookstore appearance, "because I am a concerned citizen."

Since the publication of his book, Lofgren has appeared in various news media, discussing a number of issues regarding the Republican Party and current American politics.

Lofgren's second book, The Deep State: The Fall of the Constitution and the Rise of a Shadow Government, was published on January 5, 2016. In this book, Lofgren takes his deep state argument a step further than he had put forward first in his essay: "he paints a gripping portrait of the dismal swamp on the Potomac and the revolution it will take to reclaim our government and set us back on course." Usage of the term deep state increased rapidly after Lofgren's book was published, though rarely in the way he intended.

== See also ==
- Deep state in the United States
