= Russia investigation origins conspiracy theory =

Conspiracy theory concerning the 2016 US elections

The Russia investigation origins conspiracy theory or Russia counter-narrative is a conspiracy theory created by Donald Trump, Rudy Giuliani, Republican Party leaders, and right-wing conservatives that attacks the legitimacy and conclusions of multiple investigations into Russian interference in the 2016 elections and the public and secretive links between Russian intelligence and Trump associates. Trump in particular has attacked the origins and conclusions of the Crossfire Hurricane and Mueller investigations and ordered Attorney General William Barr and U.S. attorney John Durham to conduct reviews of the investigations.

The narrative includes conspiracy theories such as Trump's Spygate theory, accusations of a secretive, elite "deep state" network, descriptions of the Russian interference investigations as an illegal "Russian collusion hoax", that the "real collusion" was between Hillary Clinton, Democrats, and Russia – and later, Ukraine.

Giuliani and Trump alleged the Russian government had been framed, and that it was the Ukrainian government that had interfered to benefit Hillary Clinton. It was later revealed in court by lawyers for Julian Assange that Dana Rohrabacher, acting on behalf of Trump, had made a quid pro quo offer of a presidential pardon to Assange, in exchange for Assange covering up Russian involvement by declaring that "Russia had nothing to do with the DNC leaks".

A further investigation by the Republican-controlled Senate Intelligence Committee published in 2020 confirmed the intelligence community's claim that Putin's "interference in the 2016 U.S. presidential election" in favor of Trump was unprecedented in its "manner and aggressiveness". The following allegations have been publicly corroborated by U.S. intelligence agencies, the January 2017 ODNI report, and the Mueller report: "that the Russian government was working to get Mr. Trump elected"; (Note: "Parts of the dossier have proved prescient. Its main assertion – that the Russian government was working to get Mr. Trump elected – was hardly an established fact when it was first laid out by Mr. Steele in June 2016. But it has since been backed up by the United States' own intelligence agencies – and Mr. Mueller's investigation. The dossier's talk of Russian efforts to cultivate some people in Mr. Trump's orbit was similarly unknown when first detailed in one of Mr. Steele's reports, but it has proved broadly accurate as well.") that Russia sought "to cultivate people in Trump's orbit"; that Trump campaign officials and associates had secretive contacts with Russian officials and agents; that Putin favored Trump over Hillary Clinton; that Putin personally ordered an "influence campaign" to harm Clinton's campaign and to "undermine public faith in the US democratic process"; and that he ordered cyberattacks on both parties.

== Background ==
Official U.S. government investigations into Russian election interference and links between Russian intelligence and Trump associates started when the Federal Bureau of Investigation (FBI) launched the Crossfire Hurricane investigation (July 31, 2016, to May 17, 2017), and continued with the "Mueller investigation" (or Special Counsel investigation, 2017–2019) established after Trump fired FBI director James Comey (raising suspicions of obstruction of justice).

The FBI opened the Crossfire Hurricane investigation in July 2016, including a special focus on links between Trump associates and Russian officials and suspected coordination between the Trump campaign and the Russian government. Russian attempts to interfere in the election were first disclosed publicly by members of the United States Congress in September 2016, confirmed by US intelligence agencies in October 2016, and further detailed by the Director of National Intelligence office in January 2017. The dismissal of James Comey, the FBI director, by President Trump in May 2017, was partly because of Comey's investigation of the Russian interference.

The Mueller investigation concluded that Russian interference was "sweeping and systematic" and "violated U.S. criminal law", and indicted Russian citizens and Russian organizations. The investigation "identified numerous links between the Russian government and the Trump campaign". The investigation resulted in charges against 34 individuals and 3 companies, 8 guilty pleas, and a conviction at trial. It concluded that though the Trump campaign welcomed the Russian activities and expected to benefit from them, there was insufficient evidence to bring any "conspiracy" or "coordination" charges against Trump or his associates, and that they were prevented from reaching a conclusion on whether Trump had obstructed justice by a Justice Department guideline prohibiting the federal indictment of a sitting president.

Our investigation found multiple acts by the President that were capable of exerting undue influence over law enforcement investigations, including the Russian-interference and obstruction investigations. The incidents were often carried out through one-on-one meetings in which the President sought to use his official power outside of usual channels. These actions ranged from efforts to remove the Special Counsel and to reverse the effect of the Attorney General's recusal; to the attempted use of official power to limit the scope of the investigation; to direct and indirect contacts with witnesses with the potential to influence their testimony.

The report did not recommend the prosecution of Trump because, based on the opinion by the Office of Legal Counsel, it did not have the authority to do so. According to the Office, "the indictment or criminal prosecution of a sitting President would impermissibly undermine the capacity of the executive branch to perform its constitutionally assigned functions" in violation of "the constitutional separation of powers... Accordingly, while this report does not conclude that the President committed a crime, it also does not exonerate him."

An investigation by the United States Department of Justice Office of the Inspector General published in 2019 found the origin of the FBI investigation was properly predicated on a legal and factual basis, and found no support for several conspiracy theories about the origin promoted by conservatives. On November 22, 2019, The Washington Post reported that the forthcoming report had found the origin of the FBI investigation was properly predicated on a legal and factual basis, and the report did not support several conservative conspiracy theories about the origin. On December 9, 2019, US Inspector General Michael E. Horowitz testified to Congress that the FBI showed no political bias at the initiation of the investigation into Trump and possible connections with Russia; In a Senate hearing on December 11, 2019, he stated that he "could not rule out political bias as a possible motivation for the 17 errors the FBI made in applications for the Carter Page surveillance." In a subsequent analysis of 25 unrelated FISA warrant requests, Horowitz found a pattern of similar errors that suggested systemic sloppiness by the FBI, rather than an effort to single out Page.

A further investigation by the Republican-controlled Senate Intelligence Committee published in 2020 confirmed the intelligence community's claim that Putin's "interference in the 2016 U.S. presidential election" in favor of Trump was unprecedented in its "manner and aggressiveness".

== Trump's "Russiagate hoax" conspiracy theory claims ==
Trump and his defenders have used terms like "Russia hoax", "Russian collusion hoax", and "Russiagate hoax" to delegitimize accusations and investigations of alleged impropriety, cooperation, collusion, or conspiracy between the Trump campaign and the government, officials, and intelligence agencies of Russia. They assert that such accusations are a hoax perpetrated against Trump by his critics and that he is the victim of a witch hunt and a "conspiracy theory … invented, funded, and spread by President Trump's political rivals".

According to Trump, the Russia investigation should never have happened in the first place, and that it was a plot by law enforcement and intelligence officials to prevent him from winning the 2016 election, and then, once he won the election, to frustrate his "America First" agenda. Trump rejects the conclusion of US intelligence agencies that Russia interfered in the 2016 election on his behalf, suggesting, without evidence, that hostile American officials may have planted false information that led to the Russia inquiry.

Trump frequently expressed that those findings called into question the legitimacy of his presidency. He attacked the Russia investigation over 1,100 times by February 2019, claiming that it was fabricated as an excuse for Hillary Clinton losing the Electoral College in 2016, that it was an "illegal hoax", and that the FBI had refused to investigate the "real collusion" between the Democrats and Russia – and later, Ukraine. However, three years after the election the FBI Director appointed by Trump, Christopher A. Wray, stated: "We have no information that indicates that Ukraine interfered with the 2016 presidential election. ... [A]s far as the [2020] election itself goes, we think Russia represents the most significant threat."

From the outset, conservatives tried to delegitimize the Mueller investigation. Republican Party leaders suggested that Robert Mueller's inquiry stemmed from a plot by members of the Obama Administration and career intelligence officials—an alleged "deep state"—to undermine Trump.

On April 2, 2019, Trump personally urged investigation into the origins of the Mueller investigation. In response, Democrats and some former law enforcement officials expressed concern that Attorney General William Barr was "using the justice department to chase unsubstantiated conspiracy theories" that could cast doubt on the Mueller report's findings.

== Claims about origins ==
Core elements of the conspiracy theory include these false claims:

- That the Steele dossier had a key role in triggering the overall Russian interference investigation. Arguments against the dossier are irrelevant to this claim as the FBI did not possess or use the dossier when they opened the investigation. The Inspector General concluded that it did not play any role in the initiation of the Crossfire Hurricane Investigation; the accusation that it was fraudulent, and that "the dossier's partisan associations" were "obscured" from the FISA court in the application for surveillance Carter Page. In fact, the first FISA application did contain a footnote added at the insistence of Deputy Assistant Attorney General Stuart Evans about the potential political bias of the Steele material. Conservatives also question the FBI's assessment of the credibility of Christopher Steele, a former British intelligence officer who ran the MI6 Russia desk from 2006 to 2009. This concern was irrelevant to the question of the origins of the investigation.
- That the investigations and surveillance were illegal and treasonous "spying" (the spygate conspiracy theory) – a "FISA abuse" narrative, notably involving Susan Rice. The use of the term "spying" in this context is disputed. James Comey and James A. Baker have described the investigations as necessary, appropriate, legal, and apolitical, and FBI Director Christopher A. Wray testified that he saw "no evidence the FBI illegally monitored President Donald Trump's campaign during the 2016 election."
- That the FBI and other institutions are "dangerously biased" against Trump (the deep state conspiracy theory), that Robert S. Mueller III's investigation was run by "13 [or 18] angry Democrats" and that Mueller was "highly conflicted", a claim debunked by Trump's own aides, and the investigation was part of a failed "attempted coup", based on private texts sent by Peter Strzok expressing opposition to a Trump presidency and speculation over removal of Trump under the Twenty-fifth Amendment to the United States Constitution following his firing of James Comey.
- That anti-Trump forces inside the FBI actually entrapped his advisers, such as Michael Flynn and may have even planted evidence of Russian collusion.
- That Russian interference was not directed by Putin, was not as significant as the president's opponents insisted, or even decisive in the outcome of the election. Proponents point to the discrepancy in the intelligence community's report on Russian interference between the FBI and CIA's high confidence and the National Security Agency's moderate confidence.
- That the Mueller investigation ended in "the complete and total exoneration of President Trump". This line was used by Kayleigh McEnany shortly after she became White House Press Secretary. About a year earlier, Trump himself tweeted 'NO COLLUSION – NO OBSTRUCTION' on the day the Mueller report came out. FactCheck.org states that while it is true that the investigation "did not establish that the [Trump] Campaign conspired and coordinated with the Russian government in its election-interference activities," on the issue of obstruction of justice, the report itself specifically says the investigation "does not exonerate him". (See also: Mueller report#False "no collusion" claims)

== Role of Mifsud ==
The narrative expanded to include the claim that Joseph Mifsud was not a Russian asset, but was a Western intelligence agent used as a counterintelligence trap for the Trump campaign, and elements of the conspiracy theories related to the Trump–Ukraine scandal; it posits that Ukraine, not Russia, was responsible for election interference. The theory further claimed that Ukraine had interfered in the elections at the behest of the Democratic Party to benefit Hillary Clinton's election campaign, and that they had planted evidence that Russia was responsible and had sought to help Trump. US Attorney General William Barr reportedly traveled to the United Kingdom and twice to Italy to try to build support for this claim. Italian Prime Minister Giuseppe Conte contradicted this, stating that Italy had "played no role in the events leading to the Russia investigation".

== Trump's quid pro quo offer to Assange ==
On February 19, 2020, numerous sources revealed that lawyers for WikiLeaks founder Julian Assange told Westminster Magistrates' Court that Trump had Dana Rohrabacher visit Assange at the Ecuadoran Embassy in London on August 16, 2017. Assange had been in court fighting extradition to the United States on charges of computer intrusion as WikiLeaks had posted sensitive documents provided by whistleblower Chelsea Manning. During the August 16 meeting, Assange stated that Rohrabacher had made a quid pro quo offer of a presidential pardon to him, in exchange for Assange covering up Russian involvement by declaring that "Russia had nothing to do with the DNC leaks". Assange's lawyer said that he had evidence "that a quid pro quo was put to Assange by Rohrabacher, who was known as Putin's favorite congressman." White House Press Secretary Stephanie Grisham stated that Assange's claims were "a complete fabrication and a lie" and added that "the president barely knows Dana Rohrabacher other than he's an ex-congressman." Rohrabacher had previously confirmed the August 16 meeting, saying he and Assange talked about "what might be necessary to get him out" and discussed a presidential pardon in exchange for information on the theft of DNC emails that were published by WikiLeaks before the 2016 presidential election.

== Notable proponents ==
The most notable proponent is Donald Trump himself. Following the May 2018 disclosure that FBI informant Stefan Halper had spoken with Trump campaign aides Carter Page, George Papadopoulos, and Sam Clovis, Trump advanced a conspiracy theory dubbed as Spygate, which claimed that the previous administration under Barack Obama paid to plant a spy inside Trump's 2016 presidential campaign to assist his rival, Hillary Clinton, win the 2016 US presidential election. With no actual supporting evidence produced, Trump's allegations were widely described as blatantly false. Trump's allegations prompted the US Justice Department (DOJ) and the FBI to provide a classified briefing regarding Halper to several Congressmen, including Republicans Trey Gowdy and Paul Ryan, who concluded that the FBI did not do anything improper, and that Russia, not Trump, was the target of the FBI.

In June 2018, Trump claimed that a report by DOJ Inspector General Michael E. Horowitz "totally exonerates" him and that "the Mueller investigation has been totally discredited", despite the report having nothing to do with the special counsel investigation, the Trump campaign or Russia. The report was instead focused on the FBI's 2016 investigation of the Hillary Clinton email controversy.

Sean Hannity, a strong supporter of Trump, a vocal and persistent critic of the Mueller investigation on his Fox News television show and syndicated radio program, described Mueller as "corrupt, abusively biased and political". Hannity had asserted that the investigation arose from an elaborate, corrupt scheme involving Hillary Clinton; the Steele dossier, which he asserts is completely false although parts of it have been reported as verified; former DOJ officials James Comey, Andrew McCabe, Bruce Ohr, and others; and a wiretap on former Trump aide Carter Page that Hannity asserted was obtained by misrepresentations to the United States Foreign Intelligence Surveillance Court, characterizing the wiretap as an abuse of power that is "far bigger than Watergate" and "the weaponizing of those powerful tools of intelligence and the shredding of our Fourth Amendment, constitutional rights."

Jeanine Pirro, a long-time friend of Trump, described Mueller, current FBI Director Christopher Wray (a Trump appointee), former FBI Director James Comey and other current/former FBI officials as a "criminal cabal," saying "There is a cleansing needed in our FBI and Department of Justice – it needs to be cleansed of individuals who should not just be fired, but who need to be taken out in cuffs."

In May 2025, Elon Musk promoted the conspiracy theory.

== See also ==
- Alternative media (U.S. political right)
- Cyberwarfare by Russia
  - Cyberwar: How Russian Hackers and Trolls Helped Elect a President
- Fox News controversies
- List of conspiracy theories promoted by Donald Trump
- Social media in the 2016 United States presidential election
- Timelines related to Donald Trump and Russian interference in United States elections
