= Absolute Proof =

2021 film by Mike Lindell

- Title card
- Directed by: Mike Lindell
- Produced by: Mike Lindell; Brannon Howse; Mary Fanning
- Starring: Mike Lindell; Brannon Howse; Mary Fanning; Phil Waldron; Matthew DePerno
- Distributed by: One America News Network
- Release date: February 5, 2021
- Running time: 120 minutes
- Language: English

Absolute Proof is a 2021 right-wing conspiracy propaganda film directed by and starring Mike Lindell. It was distributed by One America News Network and promotes the conspiracy theory that Donald Trump won the 2020 presidential election instead of Joe Biden. Around the time of their release the documentary was removed by video hosting sites YouTube and Vimeo for violating their community standards, though a reupload of the film has since reappeared on YouTube after YouTube announced in June 2023 that it would no longer remove videos falsely claiming the 2020 U.S. presidential election was stolen.

Absolute Proof won two Golden Raspberry Awards: Worst Picture and Worst Actor (for Lindell). Lindell has since released three sequels: Scientific Proof, Absolute Interference, and Absolutely 9-0. He also interviewed Trump about the 2020 election and election conspiracy theories in November 2021.

== Premise ==
In the documentary, Lindell hosts numerous cybersecurity experts and anonymous persons whose testimonies allegedly support his claim that Chinese and Iranian hackers hacked into voting machines in order to influence the results of the election in favor of Biden.

== Participants ==
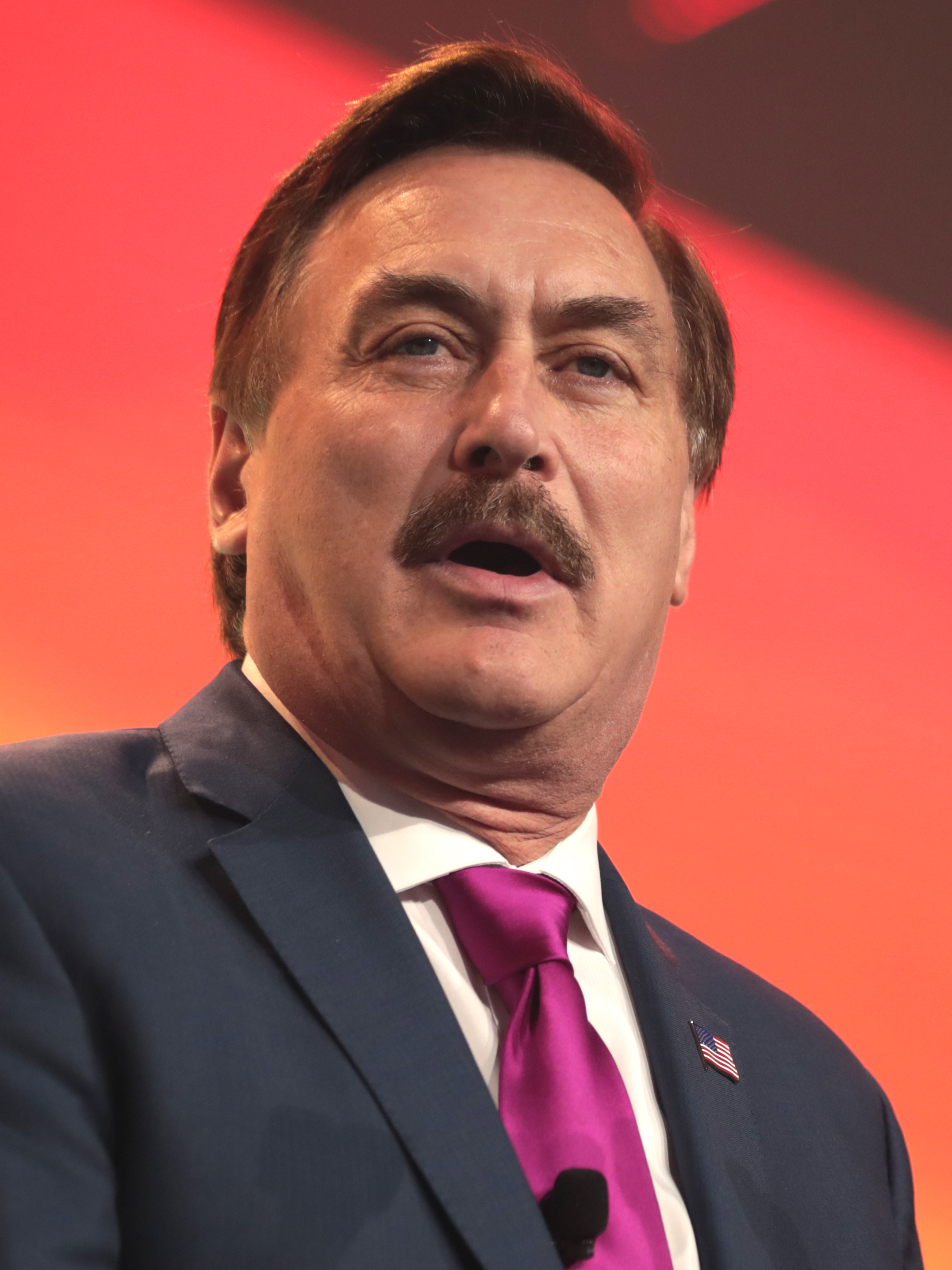
Lindell in December 2020

- Mike Lindell
- Brannon Howse
- Mary Fanning
- Phil Waldron
- Matthew DePerno
- Mellissa Carone
- Russell Ramsland
- Shiva Ayyadurai

== Background ==
On November 7, 2020, Joe Biden was declared the winner of the 2020 U.S. Presidential election. Alleging that voter fraud switched several million votes for Joe Biden, Trump's campaign and Republican allies challenged the election results. At least 63 lawsuits were filed, although none were successful. Trump and his allies unsuccessfully urged officials in states that Biden won to disqualify some ballots and to challenge vote certification processes. Even after Biden was inaugurated as the 46th President of the United States on January 20, 2021, Trump and others, including Lindell, continued to maintain that Trump had actually won the election.

== Release ==
On February 5, 2021, One America News Network live streamed the film on its website. Introduced with a disclaimer, the film shortly afterward went viral. Several hours after the live stream, YouTube and Vimeo removed all recordings of the film from their sites, citing violations of their community standards, but not before it had tens of thousands of views.

== Reception ==
The film was widely criticized by fact-checkers as being full of "debunked, unsubstantial claims." Mainstream news outlets such as The New York Times disputed its claims as well.

Lindell's staff confirmed in August 2021 that the data shown in the film was given to Lindell by Dennis L. Montgomery, a software designer with a documented history of fraud.

== Awards ==
In April 2021, Absolute Proof received two Golden Raspberry Awards, which parody traditional awards by honoring a year's worst films.

Year	Association	Category	Nominee(s)	Result	Ref.
2020	Golden Raspberry Awards	Worst Picture	Mary Fanning, Brannon Howse and Mike Lindell	Won	
2020	Golden Raspberry Awards	Worst Actor	Mike Lindell	Won	

== Sequels ==
In the months following the release of the film in February 2021, Lindell released Scientific Proof, an hour-long interview with Douglas G. Frank; Absolute Interference, a two-hour-long documentary starring Michael Flynn, which The Dispatch fact check says "recycles many familiar voter fraud claims that lack evidence"; and Absolutely 9-0, a 26-minute-long interview with an anonymous "white hat hacker" who purported to show packet captures from voting machines used in the 2020 election. In reality, the data presented was a hex-encoded version of publicly available voter registration data from Pennsylvania. In November 2021 Lindell also interviewed Trump himself at Mar-a-Lago which was later broadcast on Right Side Broadcasting Network during which Trump expressed support for Lindell's idea to melt down Dominion voting machines to turn them into prison bars.

== "Cyber Symposium" ==
On August 10, 11, and 12, 2021, Lindell hosted a "cyber symposium" in Sioux Falls, South Dakota, which he promised would produce "irrefutable evidence" for his claims that the election had been stolen by foreign hackers. However, the cyber expert he had hired to analyze his evidence said he could not confirm that claim. Lindell promised to make the purported packet captures available to attendees and offered a $5 million "bounty" to any attendee who could prove that they did not originate from the 2020 election. Just as the symposium was about to start on August 10, Lindell's website, LindellTV, was inoperative for about an hour – a problem Lindell says, without providing proof, was the result of a hack. Lindell had predicted that because of the irrefutable evidence his symposium would reveal, Trump would be recognized as the true winner of the 2020 election and reinstated as president on August 13, the day after his symposium ended. When that did not occur, he moved the predicted date of Trump's reinstatement to September 13, which also did not result in Trump being reinstated. The packet captures were never presented at the symposium and one attendee described Lindell's supposed evidence as "random garbage that wastes our time". Renowned election cybersecurity expert Harri Hursti, who attended the symposium, characterized the data presented as "a big fat nothing and a distraction". In April 2023, an arbitration panel unanimously awarded the $5 million "bounty" to cybersecurity expert Robert Zeidman, agreeing with Zeidman's assertion that Lindell had not produced any valid data from the 2020 election. Lindell subsequently refused to pay, resulting in Zeidman suing Lindell in an attempt to recover the award.
