= Joseph Uscinski =

American political scientist

Joseph E. Uscinski
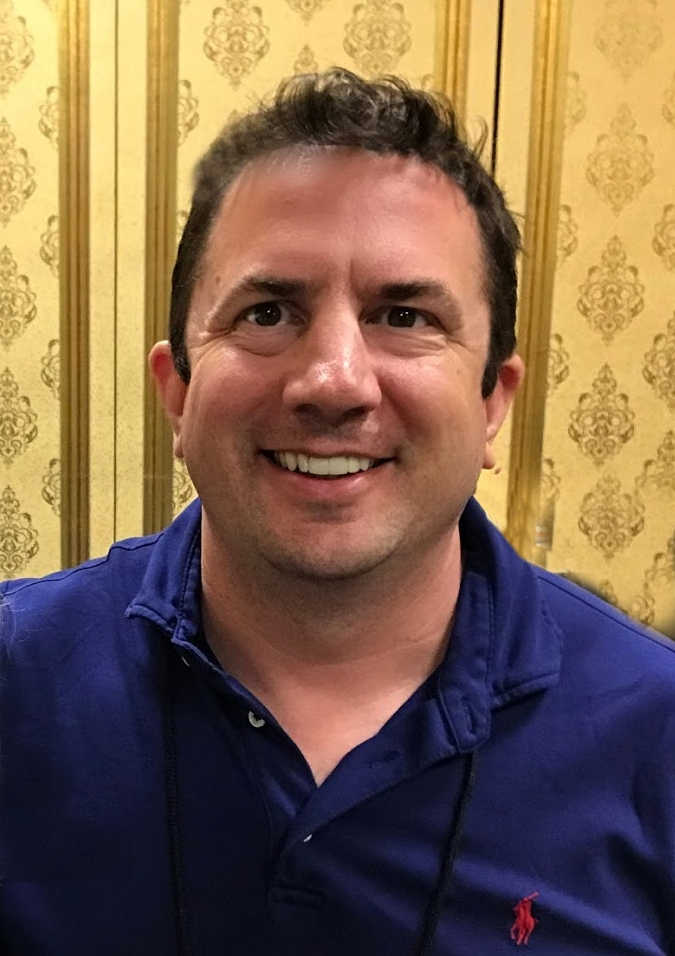
- Born: 1975 (age 50–51); Connecticut, U.S.
- Education: Plymouth State University; University of New Hampshire; University of Arizona
- Occupation: Political scientist
- Website: joeuscinski.com

Joseph E. Uscinski (born 1975) is an American political scientist specializing in the study of conspiracy theories. His most notable work is American Conspiracy Theories (Oxford, 2014) co-authored with Joseph M. Parent. He is an associate professor at the University of Miami's Political Science department, and author of several academic publications. He was named a Fellow of the Committee for Skeptical Inquiry in 2020.

== Career ==
=== Teaching ===
Uscinski is originally from New England. He received his BA in political science from Plymouth State University, his MA from University of New Hampshire, and his Ph.D. from University of Arizona. He has been a member of the University of Miami political science department since 2007.

Uscinski offers courses yearly, featuring prominent journalists and activists, with topics including the elections and immigration reform. Notable past guests have included political and prominent media figures Tom Tancredo, Mark Wallace, Joe Garcia, Carlos Cuerbelo, Herman Cain, Ileana Ros-Lehtinen, Jorge Ramos, Donna Shalala, Roger Stone, Bernie Goldberg, and Joy Reid.

He is a frequent contributor to The Washington Post Monkey Cage, and has written several academic journal articles and op-eds in publications such as Politico, Vox, and Newsweek.

=== Research ===
In 2015, Uscinski organized and convened the first international conference on conspiracy theory research in Miami. The conference featured more than fifty scholars from ten countries. Uscinski was frequently consulted by journalists during the 2016 U.S. election for his commentary on the rise of campaign-fueled conspiracy theories. and for his criticism of their use by politicians. Uscinski has said that "Conspiracy theories are in many ways a battle between insiders and outsiders over truth".

In 2018, a survey conducted with Sofia Gaston of Centre for Social and Political Risk at the Henry Jackson Society reported widespread anxiety about Americans' perceived impact of immigration. It found that 55% of Americans believe the government is concealing the true cost of immigration, which Gaston and Uscinski say indicates that conspiratorial thinking on immigration is mainstream. The survey also found that Republicans are most conspiratorial about immigration, but that 33-50% of Democrats share the same views. This survey was then similarly replicated in the United Kingdom, revealing that 58% of British adults believe the government is concealing the cost of immigration, and that 59% believe those who have spoken out about immigration have been treated unfairly.

== Publications ==
=== The People's News: Media, Politics, and the Demands of Capitalism ===
Uscinski's first book, The People's News: Media, Politics, and the Demands of Capitalism, was published by New York University Press in 2014. In it, he discusses ways in which consumer demands influence American journalism (and vice versa). He argues that profit motives are a major factor driving American journalism, and that pleasing an audience often overwhelms journalistic and democratic values. He suggests specific changes to journalistic practice.

Determining whether to cover or republish a story is determined not only by the importance of the events involved, but also by whether the audience is likely to be interested in them. To quantify this idea, Uscinski and his collaborators looked at the likelihood that regional newspapers would reprint stories depending on whether or not the stories focused on dogs. Stories that mentioned dogs were identified from the front page and the back of the national section of the New York Times over a 12-year period. They were compared to stories of similar length and visibility that did not mention dogs. The researchers then checked ten other local and national newspapers to see how many newspapers reprinted the stories. Their study found that dog stories were 2.6 times more likely to be reprinted elsewhere than equivalent dog-free news.

=== American Conspiracy Theories ===
Uscinski's second book, co-authored with Joseph M. Parent, American Conspiracy Theories, was published by Oxford University Press in 2014. In this book, Uscinski and Parent study the waxing and waning of conspiracy theorizing over time in the United States. Their research included the examination of more than 100,000 letters printed in the New York Times between 1890 and 2010, to see how conspiracy beliefs have changed with time. They identified 875 letters that alleged conspiracies: most involved geopolitical or domestic political conspiracies, while others were "just bizarre", While the data showed a spike during the McCarthy era, there was no evidence to support an increase in conspiracy theories over the years surveyed.

The main hypothesis of the book is that "conspiracy theories are for losers". The authors argue that those who are out of power tend to use conspiracy theories to consolidate resources, focus attention on an enemy, and aim at redemption. This manifests itself particularly after elections. According to Uscinski, "in the U.S., conspiracy theories tend to swing back and forth. When a Democrat is in the White House, the most resonant conspiracy theories accuse Democrats and their allies of conspiring. When a Republican is in the White House, the accusations focus on Republicans and their allies." The book has been widely reviewed and discussed. Recent survey evidence taken before and after the 2016 election provides positive evidence for the "conspiracy theories are for losers" theory.

More controversially, Uscinski argues that Republicans and Democrats are equally taken to conspiracy theorizing, and that Americans may not be engaging in conspiracy theorizing more than in previous decades. Surveys also found that the less educated the respondent, the more likely he or she was to be predisposed to conspiratorial thinking, and that the poor tended to be more conspiratorially inclined than the rich.

Uscinski has also found that there are individual differences in our more general proneness toward conspiracy theory thinking. "Some people see events and circumstances and immediately think that a conspiracy is behind them. Other people don't. Our propensity to see conspiracies lurking behind every corner is largely determined by processes that occurred during our formative years. People's world views are solidified as they move into adulthood."

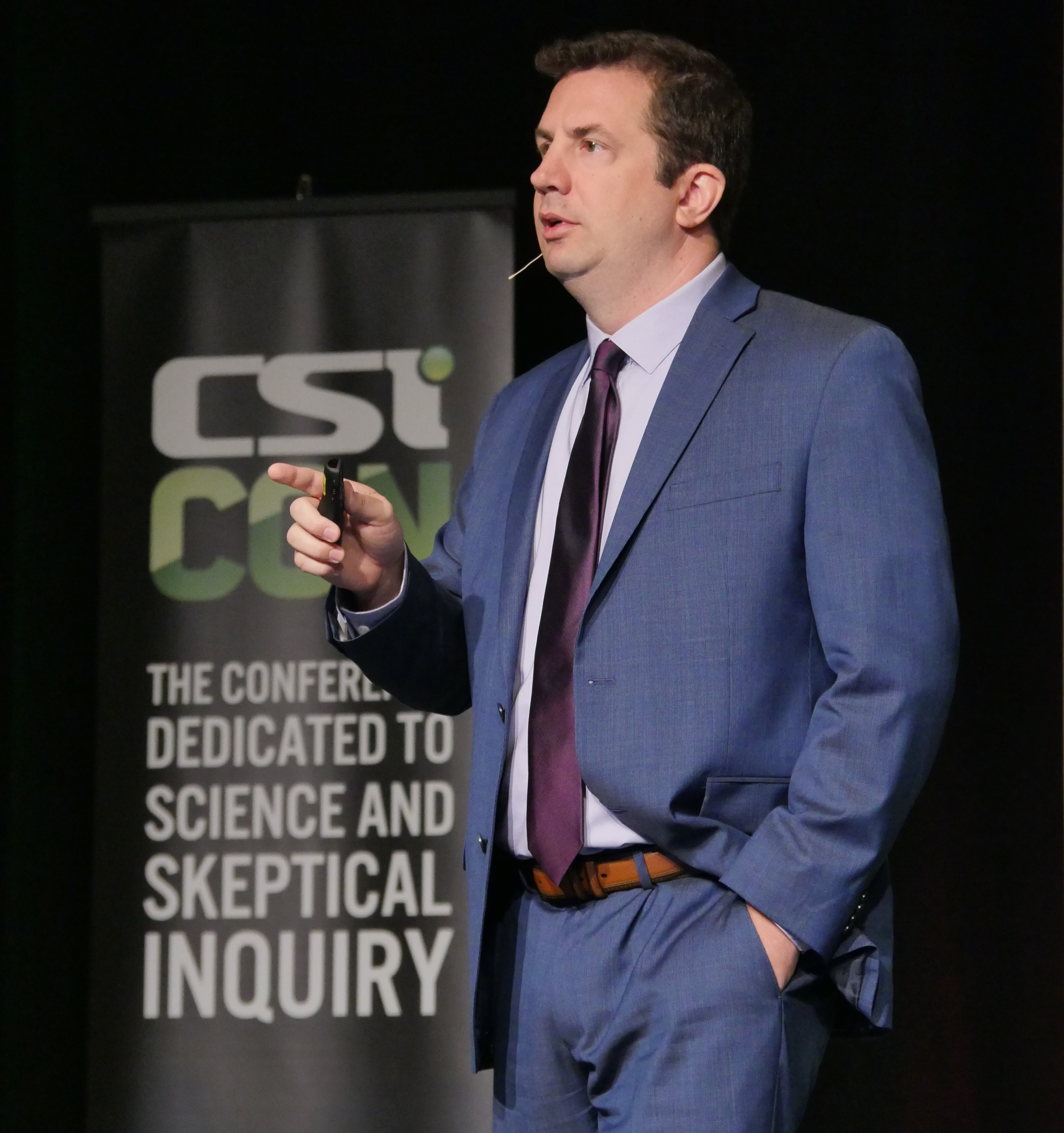
Joseph Uscinski speaking at CSICon 2018

Uscinski prominently discussed the use of conspiracy theories in the 2016 election. He argued that President Trump was using conspiracy theories to mobilize sectors of the electorate that did not trust mainstream candidates. Since the election, Uscinski has spoken against fake news, but has suggested that fake news may not be a new problem.

=== Conspiracy Theories and the People Who Believe Them ===
Uscinski's third book, Conspiracy Theories and the People Who Believe Them, was published by Oxford University Press in 2018. The book explores the dark corners of conspiracy theories, how people and democracies act on them, and how the phenomenon affects politics and society.

== Personal life ==
Uscinski was born in Connecticut and lived there until 1983 until his family moved to New Hampshire. Since he was a Yankees fan and found himself in Red Sox territory, Uscinski said he was tormented by classmates. "Keep in mind, the Red Sox back then were the biggest losers on the planet, and their fans were terribly angry. Once they started winning in 2004, they went into therapy to deal with the fact that they were no longer losers. Because of this, it's much easier to visit home now...."
