= Deep state conspiracy theory in the United States =

Alleged conspiracy theory of clandestine networks

In the United States, a political conspiracy theory posits the existence of a deep state within the US federal government, primarily composed of members of the FBI and CIA. Proponents argue that a clandestine network of conspirators within the leadership of the financial and industrial sectors exercise power alongside or within the elected government.

There have been precursors to the idea of a deep state conspiracy since at least the 1950s. The term deep state originated in the 1990s as a reference to high-level anti-democratic coalitions in Turkey, but began to be used to refer to the American government as well, including during the Obama administration. Allegations of a deep state conspiracy reached mainstream recognition under the first presidency of Donald Trump, who claimed the "deep state" was working against him and his administration's agenda, but public opinion pointed out as inaccurate.

== Origins of the concept ==
Although the term deep state is thought to have originated in Turkey in the 1990s, belief in the concept of a deep state has been present in the United States since at least the 1950s. A 1955 article in the Bulletin of the Atomic Scientists, quotes Americans sharing their belief in the existence of a "dual state": a hidden national security hierarchy and shadow government that monitors and controls elected politicians.

President Dwight Eisenhower warned in his 1961 farewell address:

In the councils of government, we must guard against the acquisition of unwarranted influence, whether sought or unsought, by the military-industrial complex. The potential for the disastrous rise of misplaced power exists and will persist. We must never let the weight of this combination endanger our liberties or democratic processes. We should take nothing for granted. Only an alert and knowledgeable citizenry can compel the proper meshing of the huge industrial and military machinery of defense with our peaceful methods and goals, so that security and liberty may prosper together.

== Usage by Donald Trump and allies ==
U.S. Attorney General Merrick Garland (pictured) has been targeted by numerous "deep state" conspiracy theorists and Donald Trump supporters for the 2022 FBI search of Mar-a-Lago.

During his first presidency, Donald Trump and his strategists alleged that the deep state was interfering with his agenda and that the United States Department of Justice was part of the deep state because it did not prosecute Huma Abedin or James Comey. Some Trump allies and right-wing media outlets alleged that Obama was coordinating a deep state resistance to Trump. Rebecca Gordon, an author and teacher at the University of San Francisco, writes that Trump has used the term deep state to refer to the U.S. government, in particular government Institutions that "frustrate" him, as well as block or fail to implement his government policy such as courts, the Justice Department, and the news media.

Trump's supporters have used the term deep state to refer to allegations that intelligence officers and executive branch officials were influencing policy via leaks or other internal means. Political commentator and former presidential adviser David Gergen has said that the term has been appropriated by Steve Bannon, Breitbart News, and other supporters of the Trump administration in order to delegitimize the critics of the Trump presidency. The concept of a deep state is a central tenet of the QAnon pro-Trump conspiracy theory movement.

Journalist Tim Sullivan, writing on the Associated Press website, described Trump's talk of a deep state as "repeating a longtime [John Birch Society] talking point." Commentators and academics have warned that use of the term in the United States could undermine public confidence in institutions and be used to justify suppression of dissent. Journalist Niall Stanage has described how critics of Trump's use of the term deep state maintain that it is a conspiracy theory with no basis in reality. Fox News panelist Charles Krauthammer has ridiculed the idea of the deep state, arguing that the United States government is controlled by a bureaucracy, rather than a government-wide conspiracy.

== Analysis ==
Compared with developing governments such as Egypt, Pakistan, and Turkey, governmental power structures in the United States are "almost entirely transparent". According to UCLA School of Law professor Jon D. Michaels, the American 'deep state', which is really the 'American bureaucracy', includes federal agencies responsible for regulation, welfare, crime prevention, and defense, and the employees who operate them, fundamentally differs from Trump's use of the term in five important respects:

- Not Elitist – In the US, bureaucrats come from a diverse range of socio-economic backgrounds, especially when compared to those in the Middle East, and even Western Europe.
- Not Shadowy – American agencies are generally "transparent and accessible", in comparison to those of the Middle East, Asia, and Europe.
- Not Monolithic – the American deep state is "internally diverse and fragmented."
- A Bulwark, Not a Battering Ram – actions of civil servants in the US are inherently defensive, not proactive.
- Not an Extraconstitutional Force – the bureaucracy should be seen as part of the constitutional system of checks and balances in the US, which often serves as a final check on presidential or agency overreach.

Political scientist George Friedman writes that the so-called "deep state" is no secret and the civil service was created by law to limit the power of the president.

In an interview for The Intercept, historian Alfred W. McCoy responded to a question by Jeremy Scahill about "what people loosely call the deep state right now" that the increase in the power of the United States Intelligence Community since the September 11 attacks "has built a fourth branch of the U.S. government" that is "in many ways autonomous from the executive, and increasingly so".

Tufts University professor Michael J. Glennon stated that President Barack Obama did not succeed in resisting or changing what he calls the "double government" and points to Obama's failure to close Guantanamo Bay detention camp, a major campaign promise, as evidence of the existence of a deep state.

According to Stephen Walt, professor of international relations at Harvard University, there is no deep state and that "to the extent that there is a bipartisan foreign-policy elite, it is hiding in plain sight".

Journalist Marc Ambinder has suggested that a myth about the deep state is that it functions as one entity; in reality, he states "the deep state contains multitudes, and they are often at odds with one another".

Linguist Geoffrey Nunberg has said that "deep state" is an "elastic label" in that "its story conforms to the intricate grammar of those conspiracy narratives", referencing the transition of conservative rhetoric regarding "big government" from "meddlesome bunglers" to "conniving ideologues".

== Public attitudes ==
According to journalist David S. Rohde, belief in the "deep state" is an increasingly partisan issue: while the term "deep state" is frequently used by American conservatives to refer to an administrative state which they believe has grown too large and powerful and which threatens individual liberty, American liberals are more apt to point to the "military–industrial complex", a cabal of military generals and defense industry corporations whom they believe enrich themselves by promoting endless wars and mass surveillance of Americans.

According to an ABC News/Washington Post poll of Americans in April 2017, about half (48%) thought there was a "deep state", defined as "military, intelligence and government officials who try to secretly manipulate government", while about a third (35%) of all participants thought it was a false conspiracy theory, and the remainder (17%) had no opinion. Of those who believe a deep state exists, more than half (58%) said it was a major problem, a net of 28% of those surveyed.

A March 2018 poll by Monmouth University found most respondents (63%) were unfamiliar with "deep state" but a majority believe that a deep state likely exists in the United States when described as "a group of unelected government and military officials who secretly manipulate or direct national policy". Three-fourths (74%) of the respondents say that they believe this type of group probably (47%) or definitely (27%) exists in the federal government.

An October 2019 The Economist/YouGov poll found that, without giving a definition of "deep state" to respondents, 70% of Republicans, 38% of independents, and 13% of Democrats agreed that a deep state was "trying to overthrow Trump".

A December 2020 National Public Radio/Ipsos poll found that 39% of Americans believed that there was a deep state working to undermine president Trump.

== Related concepts ==
In his 2015 book The State: Past, Present, Future, academic Bob Jessop comments on the similarity of three constructs:

1. The deep state, for which he cites former Republican congressional aide Mike Lofgren: "a hybrid association of elements of government and parts of top-level finance and industry that is effectively able to govern... without reference to the consent of the governed as expressed through the formal political process."
2. The dark state, or "networks of officials, private firms, media outlets, think tanks, foundations, NGOs, interest groups, and other forces that attend to the needs of capital, not of everyday life" while "concealed from public gaze" or "hidden in plain sight," citing political scientist Jason Lindsay's 2013 article.
3. The 4th branch of U.S. government, which consists of "an ever more unchecked and unaccountable centre... working behind a veil of secrecy," citing Tom Engelhardt's 2014 book.

== See also ==
- Cabal
- Elite capture
- Fifth column
- Parallel state
- Power behind the throne
- Shadow government (conspiracy theory)
- Smoke-filled room
