= Conspiracy theories related to the 2019 Trump–Ukraine scandal =

Dispute about Russian interference in the 2016 U.S. elections

Since 2016, 45th and 47th president of the United States Donald Trump and his allies have promoted several conspiracy theories related to the 2019 Trump–Ukraine scandal. One such theory seeks to blame Ukraine, instead of Russia, for interference in the 2016 United States presidential election. Also among the conspiracy theories are accusations against Joe Biden and his son Hunter Biden, and several elements of the right-wing Russia investigation origins conspiracy theory.

American intelligence agencies believe that Russia engaged in a years-long campaign to frame Ukraine for the 2016 election interference, that the Kremlin is the driving force behind the promotion of the fictitious alternative narratives, and that these conspiracy theories are harmful to the United States. FBI director Christopher A. Wray stated to ABC News that "We have no information that indicates that Ukraine interfered with the 2016 presidential election" and that "as far as the [2020] election itself goes, we think Russia represents the most significant threat."

On August 18, 2020, the Republican-controlled Senate Intelligence Committee released its final report on Russian interference in the 2016 campaign, finding that while he was Trump's campaign manager, Paul Manafort worked with a close associate, who was a Russian intelligence officer, "on narratives that sought to undermine evidence that Russia interfered in the 2016 U.S. election" and to direct such suspicions toward Ukraine.

== Background ==
According to FBI witness interview notes released in October 2019, upon hearing news of a hack of a Democratic National Committee server in June 2016, Trump campaign chairman Paul Manafort speculated that Ukraine rather than Russia was culpable, a narrative that was also promoted by Konstantin Kilimnik, thought to be a Russian intelligence asset with whom Manafort was working along with Lev Parnas and Igor Fruman.

The Republican-controlled Senate Intelligence Committee report concluded in August 2020 that during the campaign Manafort actively worked with Kilimnik, whom the report called a "Russian intelligence officer," to deflect interference suspicions from Russia onto Ukraine, characterizing Manafort's activities as a "grave counterintelligence threat".

The New Yorker found that reporting of the conspiracy in the right-wing media was initiated by Peter Schweizer, a former Breitbart News contributor and president of the Government Accountability Institute, "a self-styled corruption watchdog group chaired and funded by conservative mega-donor Rebekah Mercer" and founded by Steve Bannon.

=== Adoption by Trump ===
President Trump had long felt that the conclusion of the United States Intelligence Community and the Mueller Report – that the Russian government had interfered in the 2016 election to benefit him – might undermine the legitimacy of his election as president.

Trump and his allies – most notably his personal attorney Rudy Giuliani – promoted the alternative narrative that the Ukrainian government, not Russia, had interfered to benefit Hillary Clinton, in coordination with Democrats, the digital forensics company CrowdStrike, and the FBI, and asserted that the Russian government had been framed.

Trump also sought to use Julian Assange and WikiLeaks to promote the idea that Russia was innocent. On 16 August 2017, U.S. Republican congressman Dana Rohrabacher visited Assange and told him that Trump would pardon him on condition that he would agree to say that Russia was not involved in the 2016 Democratic National Committee email leaks. At his extradition hearings in 2020, Assange's defence team alleged in court that this offer was made "on instructions from the president". Trump and Rohrabacher subsequently said they had never spoken about the offer and Rohrabacher said he had made the offer on his own initiative.

The New York Times reported in November 2019 that American intelligence determined Russia conducted a years-long campaign to frame Ukraine for the 2016 election interference. Contrary to Trump's allegations, it is the consensus judgment of the American intelligence community and the Senate Intelligence Committee that it was Russia, not Ukraine, that interfered in the 2016 elections.

Trump also falsely asserted that CrowdStrike, a publicly owned American company, was owned by an unnamed wealthy Ukrainian oligarch. The conspiracy theory claimed that the company — which had investigated a hack of a Democratic National Committee (DNC) server — had planted evidence on the server to implicate Russia, and that the FBI had failed to take possession of the server to verify that claim. Although the FBI did not take possession of the server, CrowdStrike had provided the FBI with an exact disk image and traffic logs of the server to conduct its own analysis, which led the Mueller Report to concur with the intelligence community that the server had been hacked by Russian intelligence. Two weeks prior to taking office, Trump was briefed by top American intelligence officials that American, British and Dutch intelligence had attributed the DNC hack to Russia by hacking into Russian intelligence networks and observing stolen DNC emails there. Trump was also told at that meeting that a Russian mole the CIA had cultivated for decades and who had reached the highest levels of the Kremlin told the CIA that Putin personally ordered and orchestrated the Russian interference in the 2016 election.

Trump also asserted without evidence that Ukraine was in possession of the DNC server, as well as Hillary Clinton's deleted emails. Trump and Giuliani falsely asserted that Ukraine's involvement also included the Steele dossier, which was echoed by congressman Devin Nunes, a staunch Trump defender, during an impeachment inquiry hearing in September 2019. One former senior White House official said Trump explicitly stated Ukraine was culpable because "Putin told me." The conspiracy theory later evolved to include baseless allegations of corruption by Joe Biden and his son Hunter Biden in their activities in Ukraine. In November 2019, Trump ally senator Rand Paul extended the conspiracy theory by asserting without evidence that the anonymous whistleblower who had triggered the Trump-Ukraine scandal "is a material witness to the possible corruption of Hunter Biden and Joe Biden," adding, "[the whistleblower] might have traveled with Joe Biden to Ukraine for all we know." Bloomberg News reported in January 2020 that American intelligence and law enforcement were examining whether Russia was involved in promoting disinformation to undermine Biden as part of a campaign to disrupt the 2020 election. In August 2020, CNN reported that intelligence officials had briefed senators, representatives and both the Biden and Trump campaigns with information "indicating Russia is behind an ongoing disinformation push targeting" Biden.

This led Trump to pressure Ukrainian president Volodymyr Zelenskyy to open an investigation into the matters, which triggered the Trump–Ukraine scandal, which in turn led to the opening of an impeachment inquiry into Trump. During an October 16, 2019, press meeting in the Oval Office, Trump asked about the DNC server eight times in rapid succession, which "they say, is held by a company whose primary ownership, individual, is from Ukraine." His staff had repeatedly attempted to persuade Trump that the conspiracy theory had no merit, including his former homeland security advisor Tom Bossert, who later remarked, "the DNC server and that conspiracy theory has got to go...If he continues to focus on that white whale, it's going to bring him down."

During November 2019 hearings for the impeachment inquiry, Fiona Hill — until August 2019 the top Russia expert on the National Security Council — criticized Republicans for promulgating a "fictional narrative":

Based on questions and statements I have heard, some of you on this committee appear to believe that Russia and its security services did not conduct a campaign against our country — and that perhaps, somehow, for some reason, Ukraine did. This is a fictional narrative that has been perpetrated and propagated by the Russian security services themselves.

— Fiona Hill

As Trump and other Republicans used the hearings to promote the Ukraine interference conspiracy theory, Russian president Vladimir Putin remarked, "We see what is going on there in the U.S. now. Thank God nobody is accusing us anymore of interfering in the U.S. elections. Now they're accusing Ukraine." During the weeks leading to Hill's testimony, American intelligence officials had briefed senators and their staffs about a yearslong campaign by Russia to frame Ukraine for the 2016 election interference.

=== Propagators among Republican members of Congress ===
Republican representatives and senators who have promoted the idea that Ukraine interfered in the 2016 election despite conclusions that there is no evidence of this from the Senate Intelligence Committee and U.S. intelligence agencies include the following:

==== Representatives ====
- Devin Nunes (R-CA)
- Jim Jordan (R-Ohio)
- Matt Gaetz (R-Florida)
- Louie Gohmert (R-Texas)

==== Senators ====
- Chuck Grassley (R-IA)
- John Kennedy (R-LA)
- Richard Burr (R-NC)
- Lindsey Graham (R-SC)
- Ted Cruz (R-TX)
- Ron Johnson (R-WI)
- John Barrasso (R-WY)

In response to these statements by Republican senators, as well as making other unsubstantiated claims including about the Mueller investigation, Senate minority leader Chuck Schumer (D-NY) said on December 10, 2019, that the Senate GOP is becoming the "conspiracy caucus". Schumer said that Trump, Attorney General William Barr and GOP lawmakers should stop "pushing baseless conspiracy theories and instead work in a bipartisan fashion to ensure the FBI and the Intelligence Community have the full support and resources necessary to stop Putin and any other foreign adversary from interfering in the 2020 elections." On December 20, 2019, former Senator Jeff Flake (R-AZ), an ardent critic of President Trump, published an opinion piece in The Washington Post admonishing House and Senate Republicans for "attempting to shift blame with the promotion of bizarre and debunked conspiracy theories", and asked them to administer impartial justice in the upcoming impeachment trial of Donald Trump.

=== Statements by Cabinet-level officials ===
==== Appearing to support conspiracy theories ====
===== Secretary of State Mike Pompeo =====
On November 26, 2019, Secretary of State Mike Pompeo appeared to grant legitimacy to the notion that Ukraine, rather than or in addition to Russia, was behind interference in the 2016 United States elections. He had been asked by a reporter "Do you believe that the U.S. and Ukraine should investigate the theory that it was Ukraine and not Russia that hacked the DNC emails in 2016?" Pompeo responded "Any time there is information that indicates any country has messed with American elections, we not only have a right but a duty to make sure we chase that down," adding, "to protect our elections, America should leave no stone unturned." This is despite Pompeo's former role personally briefing President Trump as CIA director that Russia was behind the interference, as well as his May 2017 testimony to the Senate.

===== Attorney General William Barr =====
On December 10, 2019, the day following the publication of a Justice Department inspector general report on the origins of the Mueller investigation, Barr claimed in an interview with NBC news that the Russia investigation was "completely baseless" and said he believed the FBI's investigation was conducted in "bad faith". Unlike FBI Director Christopher Wray's remarks the day prior, Barr refused to refute the conspiracy theory of Ukrainian interference in the 2016 election. Barr again asserted the FBI investigation was opened "without any basis" in April 2020.

==== Denying conspiracy theories ====
===== FBI Director Christopher A. Wray =====
On December 9, 2019, following the release of the DoJ inspector general's report into the origins of the FBI-Mueller Russia investigation, FBI Director Christopher A. Wray was interviewed by ABC News. In the interview, Wray pushed back on the conspiracy theory that Ukraine interfered in the 2016 presidential election, stating "We have no information that indicates that Ukraine interfered with the 2016 presidential election" and "as far as the [2020] election itself goes, we think Russia represents the most significant threat." Wray added, "there's all kinds of people saying all kinds of things out there. I think it's important for the American people to be thoughtful consumers of information and to think about the sources of it and to think about the support and predication for what they hear."

== Distraction using Russian interference investigation ==
President Trump directed attorney general Bill Barr to "investigate the investigators" who opened the FBI investigation into Russian interference, supposedly for partisan political motives to harm Trump; allied intelligence services are alleged to have been part of the scheme. That FBI investigation led to the Mueller investigation, resulting in convictions of some 2016 Trump campaign associates. In September 2019 it was reported that Barr has been contacting foreign governments to ask for help in this inquiry. He personally traveled to the United Kingdom and Italy to seek information, and at Barr's request Trump phoned the prime minister of Australia to request his cooperation. One British official with knowledge of Barr's requests observed, "it is like nothing we have come across before, they are basically asking, in quite robust terms, for help in doing a hatchet job on their own intelligence services."

Barr sought information related to a conspiracy theory that had circulated among Trump allies in conservative media claiming that Joseph Mifsud was a Western intelligence operative who was supposedly directed to entrap Trump campaign advisor George Papadopoulos in order to establish a false predicate for the FBI to open its investigation. That investigation was initiated after the Australian government notified American authorities in July 2016 that its diplomat Alexander Downer had had a chance encounter with Papadopoulos in May 2016 – two months before the DNC website hacking became known – and that Papadopoulos told him that the Russian government had "dirt" on Clinton in the form of emails.

On October 2, 2019, Senator Lindsey Graham, a staunch Trump supporter and chairman of the Senate Judiciary Committee, wrote a letter to the leaders of Britain, Australia and Italy, asserting as fact that both Mifsud and Downer had been directed to contact Papadopoulos. Joe Hockey, the Australian ambassador to the United States, sharply rejected Graham's characterization of Downer. A former Italian government official told The Washington Post in October 2019 that during a meeting the previous month, Italian intelligence services told Barr they had "no connections, no activities, no interference" in the matter; Italian prime minister Giuseppe Conte later affirmed this. The Washington Post reported on November 22, 2019, that the Justice Department inspector general had aggressively investigated the allegation that Mifsud had been directed to entrap Papadopoulos, but found it was without merit. American law enforcement believes Mifsud is connected to Russian intelligence.

The New York Times reported in December 2019 that Barr's designated investigator John Durham was examining the role of former CIA director John Brennan in assessing Russian interference in 2016, requesting emails, call logs and other documents. Brennan had been a vocal critic of Trump and a target of the president's accusations of improper activities toward him. The Times reported Durham was specifically examining Brennan's views of the Steele dossier and what he said about it to the FBI and other intelligence agencies. Brennan and former director of national intelligence James Clapper had testified to Congress that the CIA and other intelligence agencies did not rely on the dossier in preparing the January 2017 intelligence community assessment of Russian interference, and allies of Brennan said he disagreed with the FBI view that the dossier should be given significant weight, as the CIA characterized it as "internet rumor." Politico reported in July 2019 that after becoming CIA director in 2017, Trump loyalist Mike Pompeo intensely challenged CIA analysts on their findings that Russian interference was designed to help Trump, but he found no evidence to dispute it. The Times reported in February 2020 that Durham was examining whether intelligence community officials, and specifically Brennan, had concealed or manipulated evidence of Russian interference to achieve a desired result. FBI and NSA officials told Durham that his pursuit of this line of inquiry was due to his misunderstanding of how the intelligence community functions.

== CrowdStrike ==
Numerous conspiracy theories falsely assert that CrowdStrike is actually owned by a wealthy Ukrainian oligarch. In fact, CrowdStrike is not owned by a wealthy Ukrainian oligarch, but is a publicly traded company headquartered in California, and the DNC server is actually 140 individual servers, decommissioned and located in the United States, rather than being in Ukraine, as Trump has claimed.

The conspiracy theory additionally falsely asserts that FBI agents were not allowed to examine the server because such action would expose the DNC plot, when in fact (and as documented in the Mueller Report), system images and traffic logs of the DNC servers were provided to the FBI, making it unnecessary for them to actually possess the 140 physical servers.

This conspiracy theory, that originated from a "GRU (Glavnoye razvedyvatel'noye upravleniye; 'Main Intelligence Directorate') persona, 'Guccifer 2.0'", was created "to cast doubt on Russia's culpability in the DNC [intrusion]".

== Political quid pro quo ==
During a White House press briefing on October 17, 2019, acting chief of staff Mick Mulvaney linked the DNC server conspiracy theory to the Barr inquiry, as well as to a quid pro quo for the withholding of military aid to Ukraine, stating, "Did [Trump] also mention to me in passing the corruption related to the DNC server? Absolutely. No question about that. But that's it, and that's why we held up the money." While the Justice Department had previously indicated that the Barr inquiry was examining whether Ukraine played any role in the opening of the 2016 FBI investigation into Russian interference, a department official declined to comment on whether that included the DNC server theory. The New York Times reported Justice Department officials were confused and angered by Mulvaney's linkage of the DNC server, a possible quid pro quo, with Ukraine and the Barr inquiry. Hours later, Mulvaney released a statement denying he had made any suggestion of a quid pro quo.

== See also ==
- List of conspiracy theories
- Biden–Ukraine conspiracy theory
- Russia investigation origins conspiracy theory
- Russian interference in the 2016 United States elections
- Ukraine biolabs conspiracy theory
