= ROI Community =

Jewish innovation network (2006–2026)

- Formation: 2006
- Defunct: 2026
- Type: Nonprofit organization
- Headquarters: Jerusalem, Israel
- Key people: Lynn Schusterman (founder); Stacy H. Schusterman (final chair)
- Parent organization: Charles and Lynn Schusterman Family Philanthropies
- Website: schusterman.org/roi-community (defunct)

The ROI Community was a global network of young Jewish innovators, social entrepreneurs, artists, activists, and communal professionals founded in 2006 by the Charles and Lynn Schusterman Family Philanthropies. The name stood for "return on investment." Over nearly two decades, it grew to more than 1,700 members in 60 countries, convening annually at a summit in Jerusalem and supporting members through micro-grants and year-round programming. The program closed on July 1, 2026.

== History ==
The ROI Community was established in 2006 by Lynn Schusterman as an initiative of the Charles and Lynn Schusterman Family Philanthropies. It was originally co-developed with Birthright Israel and the Israel Democracy Institute, with early support from the Bernie Marcus Foundation. The program's name, ROI, stood for "return on investment," reflecting Schusterman's belief that investing in people rather than projects would generate the greatest communal impact.

The first ROI summit, known as ROI120, gathered 120 young Jewish leaders in Israel in 2006. ROI founding director Justin Korda later described the first year as "a lot more went wrong than went right," noting that the initial vision was vague: "Let's bring everyone together and see what happens, without one concrete plan for what would happen the day after." ROI member Shawn Landres, co-founder of Jumpstart Labs, described the founding vision as "a revolutionary act to bring together 120 Jews from all over the world, and not to pursue a specific policy agenda."

Annual summits in Jerusalem became the program's signature event, bringing together a new cohort of approximately 150 members each year for several days of workshops, networking, and plenary sessions with Israeli business, arts, and civic figures. Travel and accommodation were largely covered by the Foundation. Members received micro-grants to support their projects, originally large competitive grants that were later restructured into smaller annual stipends of up to $1,000 each, as well as access to the broader network and ongoing programming between summits. By 2015 the program had an annual budget of approximately $4 million, covering the summit, micro-grants and a staff of ten.

The program's slogan, "Connect and Create," was adopted around 2011 after several years of evolution. Application to the summit was by recommendation: existing members nominated candidates, with ROI staff selecting from hundreds of applicants. By 2013 the program had more than 800 alumni, described by Jewlicious as "the gold standard when it comes to the direction and face of young Jewish innovation." Haaretz and JTA reported that the 10th annual summit in 2016 drew approximately 150 participants from 29 countries.

A defining feature of the program was its geographic scope. Unlike most Jewish philanthropic networks, ROI drew members from communities across Africa, Asia, Latin America and Eastern Europe that had little access to the philanthropic infrastructure concentrated in North America and Israel. Small micro-grants of $1,000 to $5,000 enabled projects and cultural initiatives that would otherwise have gone unfunded. ROI member Elad Caplan noted: "Every single monumental change that has happened in Israeli society to do good in the world, if you dig a bit under the surface, you'll find more ROIers who are doing wonderful work."

By its final years, the ROI Community had supported more than 1,700 members across more than 60 countries.

The program did not hold summits in 2014 (a sabbatical year), 2020, or 2021 (due to the COVID-19 pandemic). Its 2023 summit was limited to existing members.

== Membership ==
ROI Community membership was explicitly designed to be ideologically broad. The program sought young Jewish leaders who were building new projects and institutions, regardless of their political or religious orientation. Members spanned the full spectrum of Jewish life and included figures whose views diverged sharply from each other and from the Foundation's own institutional positions. Among them:

- Aaron Bisman, co-founder of JDub Records, the independent Jewish nonprofit music label that introduced Matisyahu and Balkan Beat Box to mainstream audiences. After JDub closed in 2012, Bisman served as Director of Brand, Sales, and Marketing at Jazz at Lincoln Center and later became SVP of Marketing at Sesame Workshop.
- Neshama Carlebach, singer and daughter of Shlomo Carlebach, who described herself as "a proud member of the ROI Community" at the 2011 Jewish Agency Assembly.
- Cochav Elkayam-Levy, who joined ROI as a law student and later founded the Civil Commission on October 7th Crimes Against Women and Children, receiving the Israel Prize in 2024.
- Keren Elazari, cybersecurity analyst and the first Israeli woman to give a TED Talk, whose 2014 talk on hackers has been viewed more than 1.2 million times.
- Micah Fitzerman-Blue, screenwriter of A Beautiful Day in the Neighborhood and Transparent.
- Sarah Glidden, cartoonist and author of Rolling Blackouts: Dispatches from Turkey, Syria, and Iraq, winner of the 2017 Lynd Ward Prize.
- Tamir Goodman, dubbed "the Jewish Jordan" by Sports Illustrated in 1999 and the first Orthodox Jewish athlete to play NCAA Division I basketball while wearing a kippah and observing the Sabbath.
- Amichai Chikli, who joined ROI as the founder of the Tavor Leadership Academy and later served as Israel's Minister of Diaspora Affairs and Combating Antisemitism under Prime Minister Benjamin Netanyahu.
- Dan Illouz, a Likud member of the Knesset born in Montreal, who joined ROI as a social entrepreneur before entering Israeli politics.
- Yitz Jordan (Y-Love), described as the first openly gay Orthodox Jewish rapper, who raps in English, Hebrew, Yiddish, Arabic, Latin, and Aramaic.
- Daphni Leef, who initiated the 2011 Israeli social justice protests that brought an estimated 400,000 people into the streets, the largest demonstrations in Israeli history at the time.
- Avi Mayer, former editor-in-chief of the Jerusalem Post and managing director of public affairs at the American Jewish Committee, who listed his ROI Community membership in his speaker biography.
- Naftuli Moster, founder of Young Advocates for Fair Education (Yaffed), which campaigned for secular education standards in New York's Hasidic yeshivas, and named to the Forward 50 in 2015.
- Noam Shuster-Eliassi, Israeli comedian and activist who grew up in the Israeli-Palestinian cooperative village Neve Shalom, performs in Hebrew, Arabic, and English, and has described herself as anti-Zionist. Her documentary Coexistence, My Ass! was shortlisted for the Academy Awards.
- Noy Alooshe, Israeli journalist and musician who created the "Zenga Zenga" viral parody of Muammar Gaddafi's speech in 2011, which became an anthem of the Libyan opposition.
- Yair Rosenberg, staff writer at The Atlantic covering politics, culture, and religion, and author of the Deep Shtetl newsletter.
- Lacey Schwartz Delgado, documentary filmmaker and Second Lady of New York as the wife of Lieutenant Governor Antonio Delgado.
- Rochelle Shoretz (1972–2015), Columbia Law School graduate who clerked for Justice Ruth Bader Ginsburg and founded Sharsheret, a national Jewish breast cancer support organization, while undergoing chemotherapy at age 28.
- Daniel Sieradski, founder of Jewschool and a key organizer of Occupy Judaism, who received a ROI micro-grant for his "Jew It Yourself" project.
- Eli Valley, cartoonist known for satirical work critical of mainstream Jewish institutions and Israel advocacy organizations, whose ROI membership was cited by eJewish Philanthropy in 2009 as evidence of the program's ideological diversity.
- Manny Waks, Australian activist who exposed child sexual abuse at Melbourne's Yeshivah College and testified at the Royal Commission into Institutional Responses to Child Sexual Abuse.
- Logan Ury, behavioral scientist, Director of Relationship Science at the dating app Hinge, and author of How to Not Die Alone (Simon & Schuster, 2021).
- Ariel Vegosen, a Code Pink activist and BDS supporter, received an ROI MakeItHappen microgrant in 2013.
- Ethan Zohn, winner of Survivor: Africa and co-founder of Grassroot Soccer, which has provided HIV/AIDS education to more than 1.8 million young people in 50 countries.

Beyond individual members, the network generated institutional connections. Ilja Sichrovsky, founder of the Muslim Jewish Conference, noted that ROI members had served as facilitators and participants at his annual interfaith conferences: "Over the years, Ilja has enlisted numerous ROIers to come work with him. In the latest conference some six ROIers worked as facilitators and dozens more were participants."

== Closure ==
In October 2025, Schusterman Family Philanthropies announced it would close the ROI Community on July 1, 2026, after a final summit. Co-president Lisa Eisen said in a statement: "Twenty years is as good a time as any to celebrate what we've accomplished." The closure marked the completion of Schusterman's transition to an exclusively grantmaking institution. In 2024, the foundation had also wound down its Schusterman Fellowship and handed off its Reality program to iTrek.

The final ROI summit took place in Jerusalem on June 21-25, 2026, drawing approximately 300 members from across the program's 20 years of cohorts. The opening ceremony featured Israeli President Isaac Herzog, Lynn Schusterman, Stacy H. Schusterman, co-president Lisa Eisen, and Justin Korda, ROI's founding director. The Jerusalem Street Orchestra led the crowd out to Leonard Cohen's "Hallelujah" and "Jerusalem of Gold." Lynn Schusterman, then 87, addressed the crowd: "Reflecting the diversity of Jewish Peoplehood, we wanted ROI to have its home and soul here in Jerusalem. It is truly the honor of a lifetime to stand here tonight."

President Herzog praised the program's impact, calling Lynn and Stacy Schusterman "titans of the Jewish People." Following the summit's closure, ROI Community members began organizing independently, with gatherings already planned in Berlin and Israel and member-led platforms in development.

== See also ==
- Charles and Lynn Schusterman Family Philanthropies
- Birthright Israel
- PresenTense Group
- Jewish social entrepreneurship
