= Schusterman =

Schusterman is a surname. Notable people with the surname include:

- Charles Schusterman (1945–2000), American businessman and philanthropist
- Lynn Schusterman (born 1939), American philanthropist
- Martín Schusterman (born 1975), Argentine rugby player
- Neal Shusterman (born 1962), American young adult author
- Stacy H. Schusterman (born c. 1963), American businesswoman and philanthropist
