= Menschel =

Menschel is a surname. Notable people with the surname include:

- Richard Menschel (born c. 1935), American investment banker, art collector and philanthropist
- Robert Menschel (born c. 1930), American investment banker and philanthropist
- Ronay A. Menschel (born c. 1942), American politician
