= Daniel Sieradski =

American writer and activist

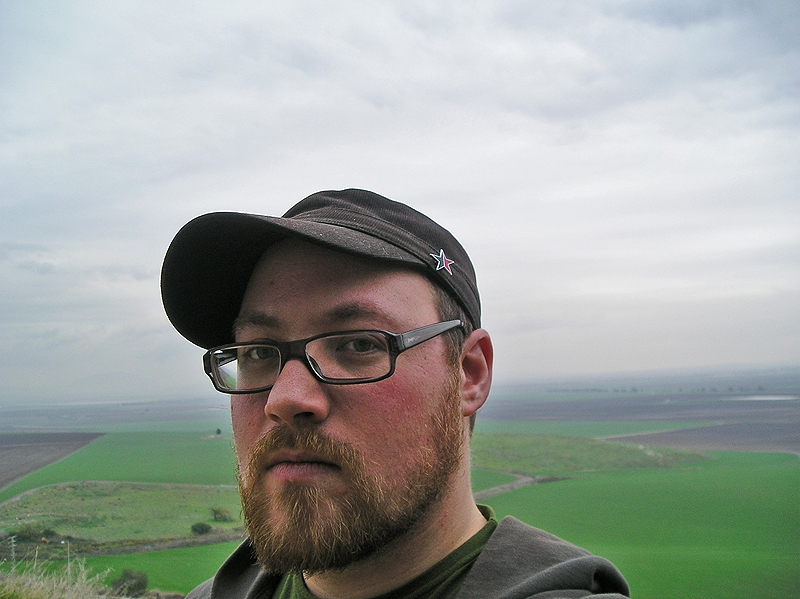
- Born: June 19, 1979 (age 47)
- Other names: Mobius; The Orthodox Anarchist
- Occupations: Writer, activist, digital media strategist
- Known for: Founder of Jewschool; Occupy Judaism

Daniel Jonathan Sieradski (born June 19, 1979) is an American writer and activist. He was the founding publisher and editor-in-chief of Jewschool, a left-wing Jewish weblog. He has been identified as an Orthodox Jew and an anarchist.

== Career ==
In 2001, Sieradski, founded Jewschool, which was called "influential" by CNET. He has also worked as a web designer and digital strategist with several Jewish organizations, including the Jewish Telegraphic Agency.

== Activism ==
=== Jewish communal engagement ===
In November 2007 he closed the main plenary session of the General Assembly of United Jewish Communities in Nashville, Tennessee, alongside other young Jewish innovators including blogger Esther Kustanowitz. Speaking as JTA's director of digital media, he criticized Jewish grant makers as "disconnected" and "soul crushing," warning that revolutionary ideas were being "shot down by no less than a dozen Jewish grant-making organizations."

Sieradski developed "Jew It Yourself," a project he described as "the 21st-century version of The Jewish Catalog" an online platform providing digital tools and crowdsourced resources for self-directed Jewish learning and community-building, including a synagogue finder and customizable prayer books, Haggadot and bentshers. As early as 2008 he had acknowledged to JTA that the project was waiting for a "visit from the funding fairy." The Forward named him to its 2010 Forward 50 list partly on the strength of the project, describing the site as "slated to launch early next year." He also received a grant from the ROI Community, an initiative of the Charles and Lynn Schusterman Family Philanthropies, to develop the project, but the platform never launched.

=== Googlebomb ===
In 2004, Sieradski organized a so-called googlebomb, an attempt at manipulating Google's search rankings. Responding to outrage over the placement of an antisemitic website atop the results on Google's search for the term "Jew" and a call for Google to censor its search results led by Steven Weinstock, Sieradski organized a campaign which replaced the site Jew Watch with Wikipedia's entry on Jews.

=== Corner Prophets ===
Sieradski organized hip-hop concerts with Israeli and Palestinian rappers, with a defunct project called Corner Prophets, with the stated intention of promoting peace and coexistence through the arts. He has also been a DJ on the jointly-operated Israeli-Palestinian FM radio station All For Peace which broadcasts from Ramallah.

=== Occupy Judaism ===
On October 7, 2011, citing the Hebrew prophet Isaiah's admonition to fast by "feeding the hungry, housing the homeless, breaking the bonds of oppression," Sieradski organized a Kol Nidre Yom Kippur prayer service at Occupy Wall Street, the mass demonstration for economic justice in Lower Manhattan that began in September 2011. Some reports placed attendance at upwards of 1,000. The Forward's editor Jane Eisner called it a positive "turning point" in American Judaism, while Commentary called it "a deeply troubling trend that all who care about the Jewish future would do well to take seriously."

Sieradski has been described as "the public face and one of the key founders of Occupy Judaism" in a peer-reviewed study of the movement published in Anthropological Quarterly.

A notable moment in the movement came when Sieradski erected a sukkah in Zuccotti Park during the Jewish holiday of Sukkot. Police declined to remove it, citing religious freedom. Other protesters then used the same justification to erect tents, which remained until the park's eviction in November 2011. OWS activists credited Occupy Judaism with creating the conditions for the tent city.

Sieradski also navigated tensions over Israel/Palestine within OWS. When the OWS media team posted a tweet expressing solidarity with a Gaza flotilla without consensus approval, Sieradski pushed for its removal on procedural grounds. The resulting controversy on social media led to what he described as a withdrawal of many Jewish participants from the broader Occupy movement.

The academic study describes Sieradski as having a "complicated relationship" with Jewish institutions—both creating new Jewish organizations and working for established ones while remaining publicly critical of the federation system and mainstream Jewish support for Israel. He described himself to researchers as "post-Orthodox."

=== Nothing to Hide ===
In June 2013, reacting to Americans' complacency over the mass surveillance disclosures revealed by Edward Snowden, Sieradski set up a Twitter account, @_nothingtohide, that retweeted users who expressed a lack of concern or outright support for U.S. government surveillance. The account became the focus of a column by Ross Douthat in The New York Times.

=== Nazi Detector ===
In June 2016, Sieradski modified a Google Chrome extension called The Coincidence Detector that was used to identify Jews with echoes, with Sieradski's modified version surrounding the names of those on its list with swastikas. It was released it in the Chrome Web Store as The Nazi Detector. Replying to The Forward, Sieradski pointed out that "this is really about folks who are harassing other folks online. The 'real' Nazis are dead".

=== Anti-fascist activism ===
Sieradski identifies as an anti-fascist and has been described as "Antifa's Most Prominent Jew". Along with other activists, he has pressured venues to ban fascist and racist events and organized counter-demonstrations.

== Reaction ==
Sieradski has been described as "a major figure of the Jewish Internet world and a cultural trailblazer with a diverse fan base" by The Forward. B'nai B'rith Magazine called him a "fresh faced iconoclast ... redefining American Judaism," and Tikkun said he was "fast becoming one of the most recognized Jewish literary voices on the Internet." The Jewish Standard described Sieradski as "a leader in a Jewish movement that is trying to create a new image for Judaism to project to its youth," and he was called "an innovator in Jewish new media" by Editor & Publisher. In 2008, The Jewish Week counted Sieradski among a group of 36 Jewish New Yorkers under the age of 36 "who are combining mitzvot, leadership and passion in making the world a better place." In 2010, he was numbered among The Forward 50, an annual listing of the 50 most influential American Jews. Haaretz has called him a "professional thorn in the side of the American Jewish establishment."

== Twitter Ban ==
In June 2017, Sieradski was banned from Twitter for terms of service violations; they permanently ban only repeated violators.

Sieradski believes the ban could have also resulted from a campaign of harassment by a far-rightwing user called "Baked Alaska", who has posted antisemitic tweets, or for tweeting to Courtney Love during a Twitter argument with Linda Sarsour. It was noted that at the time of his banning, Sieradski's Twitter account had a banner with a baseball bat marked with block letters that read "fash basher."

== See also ==
- Anarchism in the United States
