= Carnegie Medal of Philanthropy =

American humanitarian award

The Carnegie Medal of Philanthropy is a private award for philanthropy, bestowed every second year to multiple people by the Carnegie family of institutions. In recent years the medal has been presented in New York.

== About the medal ==
The Carnegie Medal of Philanthropy was inaugurated on December 10, 2001. This award, created at the centennial observance of Andrew Carnegie’s official career as a philanthropist, is given to one or more individuals who have dedicated their private wealth to the public good.

== Mission statement ==
The Carnegie Medal of Philanthropy honors Mr. Carnegie’s philanthropic achievements by recognizing the achievements of other philanthropists whose work:

- Reflects his breadth of vision and sense of private obligation to the public good;
- Is of significant dimension and has been sustained over time;
- And has had a significant impact internationally or on a particular field, nation, or group of people.

In addition to providing international recognition to individuals, families, and institutions, the Medal Awards ceremony and its associated events promote what Mr. Carnegie called “the business of benevolence” by widening the circle of international donors and advancing his commitment to giving.

The medal is awarded to philanthropists with vision for bold, broad, and permanent change, a long track record of giving, and who have also made an impact on their chosen field or community.

== The award process ==
Each awards cycle, the Carnegie family of institutions nominates candidates for the Carnegie Medal of Philanthropy. These nominations are then reviewed by a selection committee composed of four members of the steering committee that organized the inaugural medal — Carnegie Corporation of New York, the Carnegie Endowment for International Peace, the Carnegie Institution for Science, and the Carnegie Trust for the Universities of Scotland — along with two additional Carnegie institutions, which rotate onto the committee each award cycle. William Thompson, great-grandson of Mr. Carnegie and former Chair of the Carnegie UK Trust, is honorary chair of the committee. Vartan Gregorian, President of Carnegie Corporation of New York, chairs the committee.

Each medal recipient receives a bust of Andrew Carnegie — an original work of art cast in bronze and created specially for the award — and a bronze medal.

== Selected recipients ==
year	name
2001	Walter Annenberg
2001	Leonore Annenberg
2001	Brooke Astor
2001	Irene Diamond
2001	The Gates Family
2001	The Rockefeller Family
2001	George Soros
2001	Ted Turner
2003	Kazuo Inamori
2003	The Sainsbury Family
2005	Aga Khan
2005	The Cadbury Family
2005	Tom Farmer
2005	Agnes Gund
2005	The Hewlett Family
2005	The Packard Family
2007	Eli Broad
2007	The Heinz Family
2007	The Mellon Family
2007	The Tata Family
2009	Michael R. Bloomberg
2009	The Koç Family
2009	Betty and Gordon Moore
2009	Joan and Sanford Weill
2011	The Crown Family
2011	The Danforth Family
2011	Fiona and Stanley Druckenmiller
2011	Fred Kavli
2011	Evelyn and Leonard Lauder
2011	Jo Carole and Ronald Lauder
2011	Li Ka-shing
2011	Pamela and Pierre Omidyar
2011	The Pew Family
2011	The Pritzker Family
2013	Mozah bint Nasser Al Missned
2013	Tom Hunter
2013	Marilyn H. and James H. Simons
2013	Dmitry Zimin
2013	Janet Wolfson de Botton
2015	Paul G. Allen
2015	Charles F. Feeney
2015	Hanne and Jeremy Grantham
2015	The Haas Family
2015	Joan and Irwin Jacobs
2015	Jon M. Huntsman, Sr.
2015	Robert B. Menschel and Richard L. Menschel
2015	David M. Rubenstein
2017	Mei Hing Chak
2017	Marguerite & H. F. “Gerry” Lenfest
2017	Azim Premji
2017	Julian Robertson
2017	Jeff Skoll
2017	Kristine McDivitt Tompkins
2017	Shelby White
2017	Sir James D. Wolfensohn
2019	Anne G. Earhart
2019	Mellody Hobson and George Lucas
2019	Marie-Josée Kravis and Henry R. Kravis
2019	Morton L. Mandel
2019	Robert F. Smith
2019	Leonard Tow
2019	Sir Ian Wood
2022	Manu Chandaria
2022	Dolly Parton
2022	Lyda Hill
2022	Lynn Schusterman
2022	Stacy Schusterman
2022	World Central Kitchen
2025	Carol Colburn Grigor
2025	Barbara and Amos Hostetter Jr.
2025	Jeanette Lerman-Neubauer and Joseph Neubauer
2025	Comic Relief
