= Ronay A. Menschel =

American politician

- Born: Ronay Arlt c. 1942; Washington, D.C., U.S.
- Education: New Canaan High School; Cornell University
- Occupation: Politician
- Political party: Democratic Party
- Spouse: Richard Menschel
- Children: 3 daughters
- Parent(s): Paul Theodore Arlt; May MacClaire
- Relatives: Robert Menschel (brother-in-law); E. W. Priestap (son-in-law)

Ronay A. Menschel (born c. 1942) is an American politician. She was the Democratic Deputy Mayor of New York City under Ed Koch, and served on the board of directors of the Federal Reserve Bank of New York. She is the chairman of Phipps Houses.

== Early life ==
Ronay A. Menschel was born circa 1942 in Washington, D.C. Her father, Paul Theodore Arlt, was a cartoonist and painter and her mother, May MacClaire, the vice chair of the Museum of the City of New York.

Menschel was educated at the New Canaan High School. She graduated from Cornell University.

== Career ==
Menschel began her career as an administrative assistant to Democratic Congressman Ed Koch in 1969. She later served as the deputy mayor of New York City under Koch. As such, she became "the highest ranking woman in the Koch administration." She also served on the Metropolitan Transportation Authority from 1979 to 1990.

Menschel served on the board of directors of the Federal Reserve Bank of New York from 1998 to 2004.

== Philanthropy ==
Menschel became the chair of the Phipps Community Development Corporation, a subsidiary of Phipps House, a nonprofit organization for affordable housing in New York City, in 1988. She became the president of Phipps Houses and Phipps Houses Services in April 1993. She is now the chairman of Phipps Houses.

Menschel is also a former trustee of her alma mater, Cornell University. She serves on the board of trustees of the Museum of the City of New York.

Menschel has sat on the Board of Trustees of NewYork–Presbyterian Hospital since 2023.

== Personal life ==
Ronay married Richard Menschel, an investment banker at Goldman Sachs and philanthropist. They were introduced by Ed Koch. Their wedding was held at Congregation Emanu-El of New York. They have three daughters. They reside on Fifth Avenue in Manhattan, New York City.
