= Russell Simmons =

American entrepreneur and record executive

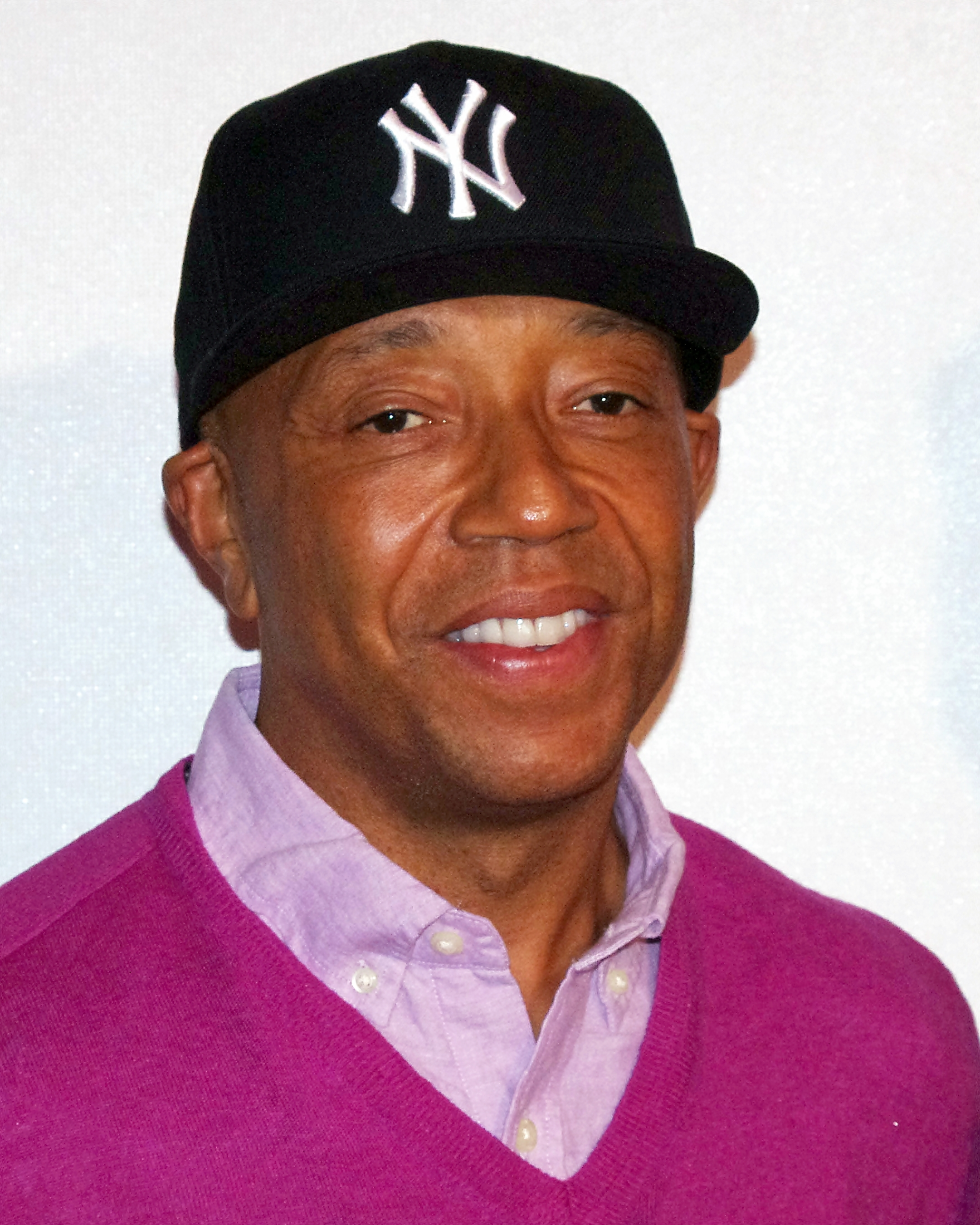
- Simmons at the 2012 Tribeca Film Festival premiere of Mansome
- Born: Russell Wendell Simmons; October 4, 1957 (age 69); New York City, U.S.
- Occupations: Entrepreneur; writer; record executive
- Years active: 1984–present
- Spouse: Kimora Lee Simmons (m. 1998; div. 2009)
- Children: 2
- Relatives: Joseph Simmons (brother); Danny Simmons (brother)

Signature
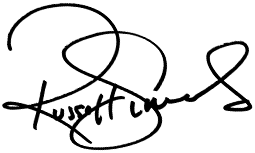

Russell Wendell Simmons (born October 4, 1957) is an American entrepreneur, writer and record executive. He co-founded the hip-hop label Def Jam Recordings, and created the clothing fashion lines Phat Farm, Argyleculture, and Tantris. He has promoted veganism and a yoga lifestyle, and published books on lifestyle, health, and entrepreneurship. Simmons' net worth was estimated at $340 million in 2011.

After producing or managing artists such as Kurtis Blow, Run DMC, Whodini, and Jimmy Spicer, Simmons joined forces with producer Rick Rubin to found Def Jam Recordings. Under Simmons' leadership as chairman, Def Jam signed acts including Beastie Boys, Public Enemy, LL Cool J, Jay-Z, DMX, and Kanye West. From 1992 to 1997, he also produced the Def Comedy Jam television program.

In 2017, Simmons was publicly accused of sexual assault by multiple women; he denied the allegations. Following these allegations, Simmons stepped down from his various business roles and charities, including his position at Def Jam.

== Early life ==
Russell Wendell Simmons was born in the Hollis neighborhood of New York City's Queens borough on October 4, 1957. His father was a public school administrator and his mother was a park administrator for the New York City Parks and Recreation Department. His brothers are painter Daniel Simmons Jr. and Joseph Simmons (better known as Rev Run of Run-DMC fame). In 1975, after graduating from August Martin High School, Simmons briefly attended the City College of New York in Harlem where he met a young DJ/Bboy, Kurt Walker, who influenced him to participate in the hip-hop phenomenon. Upon hearing Eddie Cheeba perform in Harlem in 1977, Simmons knew that hip-hop would be his career. Simmons stated, "Hearing Cheeba in '77 made me feel like I had just witnessed the invention of the wheel." In 1979, Simmons met Robert Ford Jr., who began taking him to industry events and teaching him about the music business. Simmons would later credit Ford as his "guru".

== Career ==
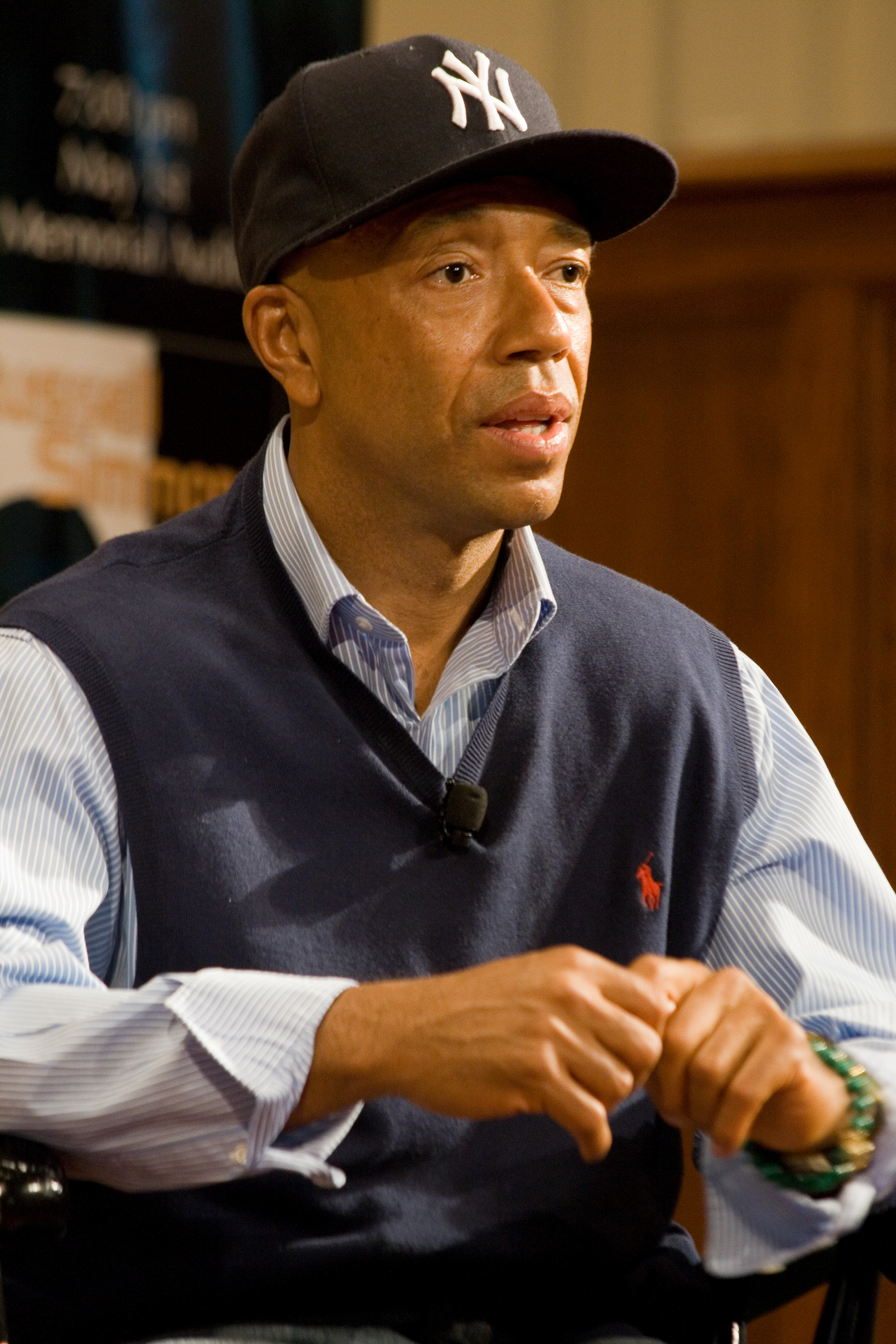
Simmons in 2007

Simmons co-founded Def Jam in 1984 with Rick Rubin. After many mergers, Simmons sold his share of the company for $120 million to Universal Music Group in 1998. Simmons co-produced and appeared in the 1985 film Krush Groove. Simmons' company, Rush Communications Inc., includes over ten businesses and three non-profits. Simmons, with his partner Stan Lathan, has also produced television hits HBO's Def Comedy Jam and Def Poetry Jam, and currently has a development deal with HBO. In 1996, Simmons co-produced the hit film The Nutty Professor, starring Eddie Murphy. In 1997, Simmons co-produced the film Def Jam's How to Be a Player, starring Bill Bellamy. In 2003, Simmons co-founded RushCard, a prepaid debit card provider.

In 1992, Simmons launched the clothing line Phat Fashions LLC using the Phat Farm and Baby Phat labels. When Simmons first created Phat Fashions LLC, the clothing line was sold in a shop in the SoHo district of Manhattan. Simmons's connections with well-known rap artists helped to promote the clothing line to a wide audience. The influence of designers such as Ralph Lauren and Tommy Hilfiger gave the clothing line a classic look and feel. Phat Fashions encompassed hip-hop clothing for women and children, as well as men, and grew into a lifestyle brand with the addition of jewelry, perfume, and other merchandise. Phat Fashions LLC sold merchandise in two stores in New York and Montreal, as well as online at www.phatfarm.com. In addition, the clothing line was carried by some 3,000 retailers in the United States.

In 2001, "Hip-Hop Minister" and former Nation of Islam minister Conrad Tillard feuded with Simmons, accusing him of stoking violence by allowing the frequent use of words such as "nigga" and "bitch" in rap lyrics. Tillard then organized a summit in Harlem over what he viewed as negative imagery in hip-hop. Simmons organized a counter-summit, urging the public not to "support open and aggressive critics of the hip-hop community".

In 2002, Simmons launched his first Broadway venture, Russell Simmons' Def Poetry Jam on Broadway.

In 2004, Simmons sold Phat Farm and Baby Phat to the Kellwood Company for $140 million.

In the same year, Simmons formed Russell Simmons Music Group, or RSMG, a record label founded as a joint venture with Universal Music's Island Def Jam Music Group. Tony Austin was the label's president.

Simmons and his brothers founded the Rush Philanthropic Arts Foundation in 1995. The foundation provides art education and support to under-serviced youth by helping people of color access the arts and by providing exhibition opportunities. The Foundation serves about 3,000 students annually and maintains two galleries. The Rush Arts Gallery in Chelsea, Manhattan and the Corridor Gallery in Clinton Hill, Brooklyn exhibit the work of more than 100 community and emerging artists.

In 2014, Claremont Lincoln University awarded Simmons an honorary doctorate degree in humane letters for his work as chairman of the Foundation for Ethnic Understanding and for promoting mindfulness, compassion and inter-religious collaboration in the public sphere.

In October 2021, Simmons released a NFT collection, Masterminds of Hip Hop. It centered on driving forces in the hip-hop music industry and was curated by Snoop Dogg.

== Personal life ==
Simmons and model Kimora Lee met in November 1991, when she was 16 years old and still in high school. On December 20, 1998, they married on the island of Saint Barthélemy. They have two daughters. In March 2006, Simmons announced that he and Lee had ended their relationship; they divorced two years later.

Simmons has been a vegan since 1999. Stating love and respect for all religions, he describes himself as a Christian yogi who practices Jivamukti Yoga, which encourages vegetarianism and social and environmental activism. He is also a practitioner of Transcendental Meditation (TM) and a supporter of the David Lynch Foundation for Consciousness-Based Education and World Peace, which was established to ensure that any child in America who wants to learn and practice TM can do so.

== Social activism ==
Simmons is an advocate of Ahimsa and veganism, citing animal rights along with the environmental and health benefits. He said he went vegan after watching the film Diet for a New America in the 1990s. He is a supporter of Farm Sanctuary, an organization working to end cruelty to farm animals. People for the Ethical Treatment of Animals awarded him the 2001 PETA Humanitarian Award and the 2011 Person of the Year Award.

In 2009, Simmons organized thousands of protestors and hip-hop celebrities in front of City Hall demanding change of the sentencing rules of the Rockefeller Drug Laws.

In 2002, Simmons became chairman of the board of the Foundation for Ethnic Understanding. In May 2009, he was appointed Goodwill Ambassador for the UN Slavery Memorial at the United Nations to honor the victims of slavery and the transatlantic slave trade by UN Secretary-General Ban Ki-moon. In a similar vein, Simmons is a supporter of the Somaly Mam Foundation, and was honored at their 2011 gala dinner. In 2011, Simmons officially endorsed the second Muslim Jewish Conference. Together with Rabbi Marc Schneier he served as the official patron of the conference held July 2011 in Kyiv, Ukraine. In 2011, he took part in the Occupy Wall Street protests, visiting the protesters at Zuccotti Park often and for many consecutive days.

Simmons is a longtime supporter of gay rights, and he encourages marriage equality. In 2011, when the retail corporation Lowe's withdrew funding from the show All-American Muslim, Simmons promised to pay the Learning Channel for any revenue lost.

In 2012, Simmons supported Ohio congressman Dennis Kucinich's re-election campaign, appearing with the politician at various speaking events. In November 2013, he pledged support for New York's mayoral candidate Bill de Blasio in recognition of his support for animal rights.

In 2017, Simmons was listed by UK-based company Richtopia at number 23 in the list of 200 Most Influential Social-Entrepreneurs and Philanthropists Worldwide.

== Vegan burgers ==
Simmons is a senior advisor of the vegan burger brand Everything Legendary. In 2022, the company secured a $6 million series A round.

== Harriet Tubman "sex tape" controversy ==
In August 2013, Simmons launched the controversial "Harriet Tubman Sex Tape" parody video on his YouTube channel, All Def Digital, which led to public outrage and many critics demanding an apology. The video featured an actress portraying the influential abolitionist Harriet Tubman (1822–1913) having sex with her slave owner with the intent of filming the act and blackmailing him to convince him to work on the Underground Railroad. Multiple Black public figures such as filmmaker Spike Lee, found the controversial comedy sketch distasteful, sexist and tarnishing the legacy of Tubman.

On his website, Simmons posted an apology for the parody, writing:

I'm a very liberal person with thick skin. My first impression of the Harriet Tubman piece was that it was about what one of actors said in the video, that 162 years later, there's still tremendous injustice. And with Harriet Tubman outwitting the slave master? I thought it was politically correct. Silly me. I can now understand why so many people are upset. I would never condone violence against women in any form, and for all of those I offended, I am sincerely sorry.

== Sexual misconduct, assault and rape allegations ==
=== Background ===
In November 2017, model Keri Claussen Khalighi accused Simmons of raping her in 1991, when she was 17. Simmons and Brett Ratner, whom Khalighi accused of watching them without intervening when she asked for his help, both deny that the encounter was non-consensual.

As the allegation was covered in the press, Terry Crews accused Simmons of attempting to influence him to take back sexual assault allegations that Crews had recently brought up against film executive Adam Venit, asking that Crews "give him a pass ... ask that he be reinstated." Crews posted on his Twitter account a screenshot of the alleged e-mail he had received from Simmons.

On November 30, 2017, writer Jenny Lumet claimed that Simmons had raped her in 1991. In response, Simmons said he would step down from his positions with his businesses. On the same day, HBO announced that they would be removing Simmons' name and likeness from his stand-up comedy specials starting with the December 1 episode.

On December 13, 2017, the Los Angeles Times published an investigative report in which five women accused Simmons of sexual misconduct, including another alleged rape. On the same day, The New York Times published the accounts of four other women who accused Simmons of inappropriate conduct, including three more alleged rapes. In response to the allegations, Simmons stated he "never had a sexual encounter that was not consensual or lawful. Ever."

On February 9, 2018, Simmons denied the allegations to Rolling Stone, saying (in part), "I vehemently deny all the allegations made against me. They have shocked me to my core as I have never been abusive or violent in any way in my relations with women. I am blessed to have shared extraordinary relationships, whether through work or love, with many great women and I have enormous respect for the women's movement worldwide and their struggle for respect, dignity, equality and power. I am devastated by any reason I may have given to anyone to say or think of me in the ways that are currently being described. I have separated myself from my businesses and charities to not become a distraction."

On April 25, 2018, Jennifer Jarosik, a filmmaker who also alleged Simmons raped her, dropped her lawsuit. The suit was dismissed with prejudice, meaning Jarosik cannot refile allegations in court.

On February 13, 2024, a lawsuit filed by Jane Doe in New York Federal Court obtained by People, alleged that she was sexually assaulted and harassed by her boss, Russell Simmons, in the 1990s. This was while pursuing her professional ambitions as an executive at Def Jam. On February 15, 2024, another lawsuit, this time alleging defamation, was filed against Simmons by former Def Jam executive Drew Dixon. Dixon was previously one of the three women to accuse him of rape in the December 2017 New York Times article.

=== Accusers ===
A number of women, some of whom were aged 17 at the time of the alleged incidents, have accused Simmons of sexual harassment, assault or rape:

==== Sexual harassment or assault ====
Women who said they had been sexually harassed or assaulted (including attempted rape) by Simmons include:

1. Keri Claussen Khalighi, model
2. Kelly Cutrone, publicist and author
3. Luann de Lesseps, reality television personality
4. Lisa Kirk, an acquaintance of Simmons'
5. Toni Sallie, music journalist
6. Natashia Williams-Blach, actress

==== Rape ====
Women who said they had been raped by Simmons include:

1. Tina Baker, singer-turned-lawyer
2. Drew Dixon, former music recording executive
3. Sherri Hines, musician
4. Jennifer Jarosik, filmmaker
5. Jenny Lumet, screenwriter
6. Sil Lai Abrams, writer and activist

=== Resignation ===
After the third assault allegation was published in a guest column by Jenny Lumet in The Hollywood Reporter in November 2017, Simmons stepped down from his roles in the label Def Jam Records, his yoga lifestyle brand, CNNMoney, and other media properties. Lumet, who is the daughter of filmmaker Sidney Lumet and the granddaughter of singer and civil rights activist Lena Horne, wrote: "As a woman of color, I cannot express how wrenching it is to write this about a successful man of color. ... I feel a pang to protect your daughters. I don't think you are inclined to protect mine."

HBO decided to remove Russell Simmons' name from All Def Comedy, a series he created to launch and showcase emerging comedians. HBO has not removed his name from Def Comedy Jams.

=== Move to Bali ===
Amid the accusations, Russell Simmons moved to Bali in 2018 where he later founded the Gdas Bali Health and Wellness Resort.

In 2024, Simmons' legal team responded to a Jane Doe plaintiff who sued Simmons in federal court in New York, claiming he raped her in his NYC apartment in the 1990s. Simmons' team argued that the court didn't have jurisdiction because Simmons was now a "stateless" U.S. citizen living in Indonesia. His court filing declared that he hadn't owned property in the U.S. since 2021 and that he lives full-time in Bali on an Indonesian retirement visa.

In 2024, Simmons refuted suggestions that he had fled to Bali to escape accusers in the U.S., saying: "I’ll be in New York next week, this idea that I’m hiding is stupid. I call the paparazzi on myself every time I’m there. I have an office on Wilshire Boulevard. I’m there all the time. I work out of New York sometimes, but I live here. I live here to heal people."

In 2025, the Jane Doe's federal lawsuit was dismissed without prejudice for lack of subject-matter jurisdiction after a New York federal court determined that Simmons was domiciled in Indonesia. The Jane Doe re-filed in New York state court under New York’s Adult Survivors Act. A New York state judge ruled in 2026 that her claim can move forward despite the defendant's move to Bali.

=== Documentary ===
A documentary film about the sexual assault allegations against Simmons, On the Record, premiered at the Sundance Film Festival on January 25, 2020, and was released on HBO Max on May 27, 2020. Oprah Winfrey withdrew as executive producer of the film, after having been pressured by Simmons to cancel the release, eventually stating there were "inconsistencies" in Drew Dixon's story that "gave me pause". Winfrey has also said, however, that she believes the women who have accused Russell Simmons of sexual assault.
