= E. W. Priestap =

American attorney and U.S. Intelligence official

Bill Priestap
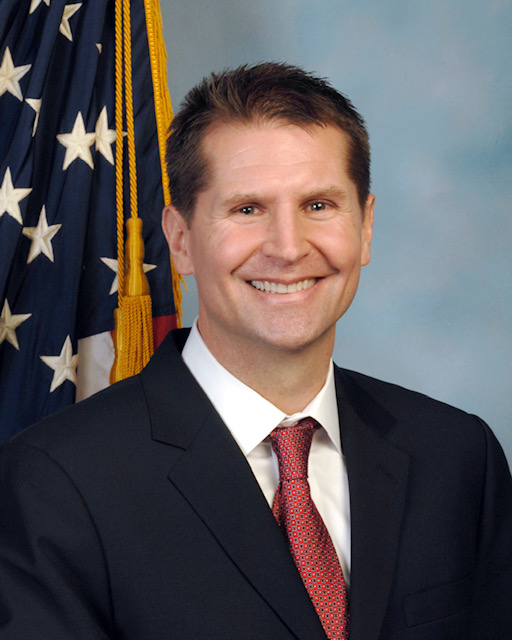
- Official portrait, 2015

Assistant Director of the Federal Bureau of Investigation for Counterintelligence
- In office December 2015 – December 2018

Personal details
- Born: Edward William Priestap; April 5, 1969 (age 57)
- Spouse: Sabina Menschel
- Relatives: Richard Menschel (father-in-law); Ronay A. Menschel (mother-in-law); Robert Menschel (uncle-in-law)
- Education: Hillsdale College (BS); University of Detroit-Mercy (JD, MBA)
- Occupation: Attorney, intelligence official

Edward William "Bill" Priestap (born April 5, 1969) is an American attorney and United States intelligence official. He was the assistant director of the FBI Counterintelligence Division from 2015 to 2018.

== Education ==
Priestap earned a Bachelor of Science degree from Hillsdale College in 1991, a master's degree in educational administration from Norwich University, a J.D. and a Master's of Business Administration from the University of Detroit-Mercy.

== Career ==
Priestap joined the Federal Bureau of Investigation in 1998, and he was appointed as assistant director of the FBI Counterintelligence Division in 2015. In this role, he opened the Crossfire Hurricane investigation into the Trump campaign's potential collusion with Russian interference in the 2016 elections. Priestap ensured that an FBI informant and an FBI investigator would meet with George Papadopoulos during Donald Trump's 2016 campaign. After arriving September 15, 2016, in London, Papadopoulos met in a private London club with a United States citizen and FBI informer Stefan Halper, who was a Cambridge professor, and a female posing as Halper's female research assistant who had invited Papadopoulos for drinks. The research assistant was an FBI investigator with the pseudonym Azra Turk but Papadopoulos stated that he believed that she "was CIA" with ties to "Turkish intel" and was tasked to learn about his work in the Energy Triangle which involves Cyprus-Greece-Israel, and competes with the interests of Northern Cyprus and Turkey. In 2018 as the FBI counterintelligence expert, Priestap informed Congress that the FBI did not spy on the Trump campaign but did investigate possible ties to Russia beginning on August 10, 2016, as a FARA case on Papadopoulos based upon information the FBI received on July 26, 2016, from the Australian government originating from Alexander Downer's meeting with Papadopoulos on May 10, 2016, in London. British intelligence was informed of the FBI FARA case on Papadopoulos and did not halt the FBI's operation from being conducted on the soil of the United Kingdom where GCHQ could assist with the FBI in the FARA case involving Papadopoulos but the GCHQ gave no comment about its role according to a May 2, 2019, New York Times article.

Priestap was involved with the investigations into Donald Trump's former National Security Advisor Michael Flynn.

Priestap will not comply voluntarily to sit before the Senate committee investigating criminal activity by the FBI. Priestap retired from the FBI in April 2019.
