= Itrek =

American Zionist organization that sponsors trips to Israel for graduate students

itrek or Israel Trek is an organization that sends graduate students in business, law, policy and STEM at U.S., Canadian, and European universities on peer-led, week-long trips to Israel. More than 1,300 former itrek leaders support it. Some trips include contacts with Israeli tech start-ups. Student groups supporting Palestine in the Israeli–Palestinian conflict have opposed the itrek program and called for cancellation or boycott of trips.

itrek has received long time financial support from the Charles and Lynn Schusterman Family Philanthropies. In 2025, it was announced that the Philanthropies' 'Reality' program, which arranged trips to Israel for emerging leaders in the United States, would be absorbed by itrek.
