= Democratic Majority for Israel =

Lobbying group advocating pro-Israel policies in the United States

- Founded: January 29, 2019; 7 years ago
- Legal status: 501(c)(4) organization
- President, Chief Executive Officer: Brian Romick
- Chair: Kathy Manning
- Website: demmajorityforisrael.org

Democratic Majority for Israel (DMFI) is an American advocacy group that supports pro-Israel policies within the United States Democratic Party.

DMFI was founded in January 2019 in reaction to polling that showed that Democrats and younger voters were less supportive of Israel than previous generations. Its current president and CEO is Brian Romick, a former senior advisor to Representative Steny Hoyer, and the chair of its board of directors is former representative Kathy Manning. DMFI's separate sister organization is the political action committee DMFI PAC, founded in July 2019.

DMFI PAC backs candidates that support Democratic policies and defend Israel inside the Democratic Party. The PAC opposed Bernie Sanders in the 2020 Democratic presidential caucuses in Iowa, endorsed Joe Biden early in the 2020 Democratic primaries and again in 2024. After President Biden withdrew, DMFI announced its endorsement of Kamala Harris in July 2024. It has endorsed Democratic candidates in both primary and general elections across the country who align with DMFI's political stances.

== History ==
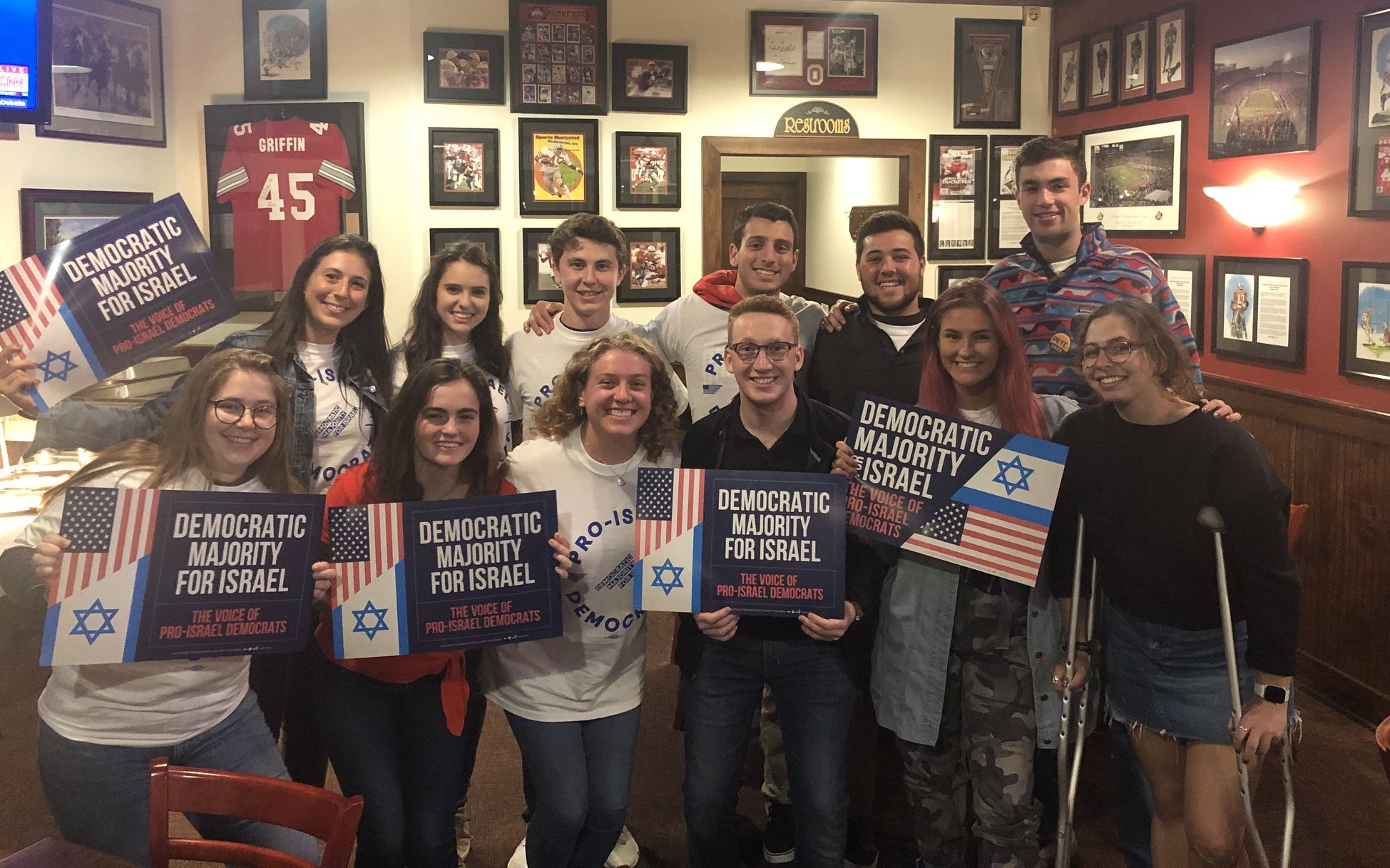
Volunteers supporting DMFI in Ohio

DMFI was founded on January 29, 2019. The founding came in reaction to polling showing that Democrats and younger voters were less supportive of Israel than previous generations. Mark Mellman and other Democratic Party strategists started the organization. In July 2019 the group formed a political action committee, DMFI PAC, which supports pro-Israel Democratic candidates.

On May 19, 2025, Brian Romick, a former senior advisor and chief of staff to former House majority leader rep. Steny Hoyer, was named president and CEO of Democratic Majority for Israel. Former rep. Kathy Manning also became the chair of DMFI's board of directors at the same time. Romick noted that a top priority is educating lawmakers and voters on why Israel deserves their backing. Manning said she wants to prioritize flipping the House for Democrats and supporting pro-Israel candidates in open primaries.

Prominent board members have included chairs emeritus Ann Lewis and Todd Richman, former secretary of housing and urban development (HUD) Henry Cisneros, and LGBTQ rights activist Meghan Stabler.

== Political activity ==
=== 2020 campaign work ===
According to DMFI, 28 of its 29 candidates won their primaries between 2020 and 2021.

In the months before the first contests in Iowa and New Hampshire in the 2020 Democratic Party presidential primaries, DMFI sent organizing staffers to identify pro-Israel Democrats, send volunteers to Democratic candidates' campaign events, and signal support for Israel.

DMFI PAC endorsed Joe Biden for president in March 2020 and ran online ads supporting him. DMFI PAC endorsed more than 100 Democrats for House and Senate in the 2020 election cycle and ran attack ads opposing Bernie Sanders's candidacy during the 2020 primaries. In total, the PAC spent over $1.4 million on advertising attacking Sanders. The anti-Sanders advertising concentrated on arguing that Sanders would lose to Trump in the general election, including arguments about his "socialism" label and Sanders's recent heart attack. The Sanders campaign said that the ads led to a surge in donations from supporters. Journalist Jonathan S. Tobin wrote that DMFI "played a not insignificant role in helping to undermine Sanders at a point in the campaign when he was the frontrunner and Biden seemed dead in the water". Political reporters Jonathan Allen and Amie Parnes credited DMFI PAC's primary ads with helping Biden secure the nomination. After his election, Biden wrote to DMFI, "I am grateful for and humbled by your statement of support for this campaign." Future United States secretary of state Antony Blinken read the letter aloud during a virtual meeting.

In the 2020 New York House election in district 16, DMFI PAC supported incumbent Eliot Engel joining Speaker Nancy Pelosi, Majority Whip Jim Clyburn, and the Congressional Black Caucus's political action committee. DMFI PAC ran ads against his primary opponent, Jamaal Bowman, who won the election.

=== 2021–2022 campaign work ===
DMFI PAC made an endorsement in the 2021 Ohio 11th congressional district special election, in which the front-running candidates were progressive former state senator Nina Turner and more moderate Democratic county councilwoman Shontel Brown. The PAC endorsed Brown, citing her likely support for Israel, Turner's interest in placing conditions on U.S. aid to Israel, and Turner's lack of a statement on BDS. The endorsement came alongside other support from mainstream Democrats, including endorsements from elected officials like Representatives Jim Clyburn and Joyce Beatty. By July 2021, DMFI had spent over $660,000 in the race. Much of the advertising suggested that Turner was too divisive. In late July, DMFI released a poll of 400 likely Democratic voters that placed Brown five points behind Turner. Brown defeated Turner. By the end of the race, DMFI PAC had spent over $1 million on television ads and over $2 million total. Journalist Daniel Marans of HuffPost said that "there's no question that DMFI played a pivotal role" in the election, which was held to replace Representative Marcia Fudge, who resigned from Congress in 2021 to serve as the U.S. secretary of housing and urban development in the Biden administration. Jewish Insider's Matthew Kassel called Brown's win a "major victory for DMFI".

In the month before the 2020–21 United States Senate special election in Georgia, DMFI PAC endorsed Raphael Warnock against Republican senator Kelly Loeffler. Warnock thanked DMFI PAC on Twitter for its endorsement, saying he would "stand for Israel's security" and "work to strengthen the alliance between our nations". The endorsement followed DMFI PAC's earlier endorsement of Democratic Senate candidate Jon Ossoff against Republican senator David Perdue. Warnock and Ossoff defeated their Republican opponents in the January 5 runoffs.

In May 2022, DMFI PAC endorsee Representative Shontel Brown defeated former state senator Nina Turner in Ohio's 11th congressional district in a rematch of the previous year's special election, winning 66.3% of the vote to Turner's 33.7%. DMFI said it had spent more than $1 million to support Brown through independent expenditures this cycle. DMFI PAC was also the largest outside spender supporting Representative Sean Casten against Representative Marie Newman in Illinois's 6th congressional district. By July, it had spent over $426,000 supporting Glenn Ivey against former Representative Donna Edwards for a Maryland House seat. Ivey won. DMFI president Mark Mellman said that 85% of the candidates his organization supported in the 2022 cycle won.

In the 2022 U.S. Senate elections, the organization endorsed reelected incumbents Catherine Cortez Masto and Raphael Warnock, and in an open race, Lieutenant Governor John Fetterman. DMFI PAC undertook several independent expenditure programs in support of Democrats against Trump-endorsed opponents. In Georgia, it ran print and digital ads in support of Warnock's campaign against Herschel Walker. In Pennsylvania, DMFI PAC ran a program targeting Republican nominee Mehmet Oz in support of Fetterman. DMFI PAC also ran an ad campaign targeting Madison Gesiotto Gilbert, the Republican candidate in Ohio's 13th congressional district, to support State Representative Emilia Skyes's successful general election campaign.

=== 2023–2024 campaign work ===
In February 2023, DMFI PAC supported Jennifer McClellan in her successful campaign to become the first Black congresswoman in Virginia history after the death of Representative Donald McEachin triggered a special election. DMFI endorsed President Biden in the 2024 presidential election shortly after he announced his candidacy.

DMFI PAC announced endorsements for 81 House incumbents in December 2023, including representatives Lizzie Fletcher, Bill Foster, and Jimmy Gomez, all of whom were facing primary challenges from Israel critics according to DMFI PAC. The PAC also endorsed Representative Adam Schiff in his successful Democratic primary campaign in the Democratic primary for the 2024 United States Senate elections in California and former Representative Tom Suozzi in the special election winning bid to replace Representative George Santos in New York's 3rd congressional district after Santos' expulsion from Congress. Representative Pete Aguilar, chair of the House Democratic Caucus, released a statement praising DMFI PAC's work in electing "more Democratic leaders that are committed to strengthening the U.S.-Israel alliance".

In May 2024, DMFI PAC announced endorsements for several more candidates. The PAC declared its support for incumbent Democratic senators Bob Casey, Jacky Rosen, and Jon Tester, all of whom are facing competitive general election races. Additionally, DMFI PAC is on opposing sides as the American Israel Public Affairs Committee (AIPAC) in three highly contested U.S. House races where DMFI PAC has endorsed the Democratic candidate and AIPAC has endorsed the Republican incumbent, in Pennsylvania's 10th district, and California's 22nd and 40th districts.

DMFI PAC endorsed St. Louis County prosecutor Wesley Bell and Westchester County Executive George Latimer in their successful primary challenges to two members of "The Squad", Cori Bush and Jamaal Bowman. Latimer defeated Bowman by 17% of the vote, supported by advertisements run in part by DMFI PAC, while Bell defeated Bush by over 5% of the vote, also in part supported by DMFI PAC. A June poll commissioned by DMFI PAC showed Bush and Bell in a statistical dead heat, and DMFI's previous poll in the Latimer–Bowman primary ended up having the victory margin exactly correct. DMFI PAC launched broadcast and cable TV ads to support Bell in his primary against Cori Bush, and to support Yassamin Ansari, a candidate in Arizona's 3rd congressional district. Punchbowl described DMFI PAC as "putting significant resources" in the race against Bell, with DMFI president Mark Mellman saying that Bush "has been one of the most bellicose, vituperative anti-Israel figures in Congress".

In response to former president Trump's pick of Senator JD Vance as his running mate, DMFI president Mark Mellman said that Vance "is a far-right extremist" and pointed to Vance's denial of the 2020 election results, support of a national abortion ban, and his vote against aid to Israel during the Israel-Hamas War. Mellman also emphasized Vance's promotion of the antisemitic "Great Replacement" theory.

DMFI PAC endorsed Vice President Kamala Harris on July 22, after President Biden announced his withdrawal from the campaign. DMFI president Mark Mellman said that Harris "helped lead the most pro-Israel administration in American history" in a statement announcing DMFI's support. The statement also noted that Harris said "support for Israel is central" to who she is when she ran for President in 2020. After the selection of Minnesota governor Tim Walz as Harris's running mate, DMFI praised Walz for ordering state flags to be flown at half-mast after the 2023 Hamas-led attack on Israel and for his condemnation of the "horrific attacks on Israel by Hamas". The group also cited his public call at a vigil for people who had not condemned Hamas to "reevaluate where you're at" after the attack and his earlier praise of Israel as "our truest and closest ally in the region".

During the 2024 Democratic National Convention in Chicago, DMFI hosted a reception with several dozen Democratic elected officials. The Dispatch said the event was a "celebration" for the group after a successful primary season and wrote that "the consistent theme from the slate of speakers was this: Support for Israel is entirely consistent with liberal and progressive values." Elected speakers included Senator Ben Cardin, Governor Andy Beshear, and New York City mayor Eric Adams, along with several U.S. House members.

In the general election, DMFI PAC launched a multi-pronged campaign in swing states to support Vice President Kamala Harris's presidential campaign. DMFI PAC released an ad "educating Jewish voters in swing states on Harris' pro-Israel record". DMFI PAC also ran an ad in swing states that emphasized President Trump's ties to antisemites, citing his connections with Kanye West and Nick Fuentes. Another DMFI PAC ad highlighted negative comments from Trump national security personnel about President Trump's fitness for office. DMFI's Mark Mellman released a statement criticizing Trump for his purported statement to his Chief of Staff Mark Kelly about wanting "the kind of generals that Hitler had".

=== 2026 campaign work ===
In February 2026, DMFI PAC endorsed Bexar County sheriff's deputy Johnny Garcia in his primary campaign for Congress in Texas's 35th congressional district. DMFI PAC president Brain Romick criticized Republicans for spending to elevate Garcia's primary opponent, Maureen Galindo, who made antisemitic statements during her campaign. Romick told The New York Times, "I think the Republicans need to answer for promoting an antisemite." After his win in the primary runoff, DMFI PAC touted its role in being one of the first to raise red flags about Galindo's comments and for endorsing Garcia early.

DMFI PAC also supported San Diego city council member Marni von Wilpert, who advanced through California's top-two primary in California's 48th congressional district. The organization spent more than $2 million against her primary opponent Ammar Campa-Najjar. In October 2026, DMFI PAC announced it would spend $7 million on advertising in support of Representatives Don Davis of North Carolina and Shomari Figures of Alabama, two Congressional Black Caucus members whose districts had been redrawn to favor Republicans.

== Political positions and other activities ==
DMFI says it pushes for pro-Israel support among Democratic Party leadership, for autonomous Israeli defensive capacity, for a two-state solution to the Israeli–Palestinian conflict, for American global leadership, for progressive values, and for education of Democratic leadership. It says it opposes "efforts to isolate, stigmatize or delegitimize Israel".

DMFI has been described as moderate and center-left. DMFI supports the IHRA definition of antisemitism and, before he won the presidency, called on Biden to adopt it, which he did. DMFI supported the Biden Administration's U.S. National Strategy to Counter Antisemitism in May 2023, especially the inclusion of the IHRA definition. DMFI also backed the Nita Lowey Middle East Partnership for Peace Fund, which is intended to promote Israeli–Palestinian dialogue and support the Palestinian economy. DMFI supported the Iron Dome Supplemental Appropriations Act, which would provide Israel with $1 billion to restock its missile defense system that was depleted during the 2021 Israel–Palestine crisis. It shared social media posts highlighting Democrats' support for the bill and criticized the delay of the bill by Senator Rand Paul.

DMFI congratulated the incoming Lapid–Bennett government in 2021 alongside many Jewish and pro-Israel groups. It called the new coalition the "most inclusive government ever" politically, religiously, and ethnically. In his first call after assuming office, Foreign Minister Yair Lapid spoke to DMFI, during which he emphasized reinvigorating Israel's ties with the Democratic Party. After Lapid became prime minister of Israel, Haaretz noted that DMFI's president and CEO Mark Mellman was Lapid's most "significant relationship in America". DMFI also joined a broad range of pro-Israel and Jewish groups in lauding Biden's nomination of Deborah Lipstadt to the post in July 2021 and urged Republican senators to stop blocking her nomination.

DMFI called former president Trump's critical comments at the end of the 2022 election about the American Jewish community "insulting and ill-informed". DMFI was one of numerous organizations that called on UC Berkeley to rescind a provision that banned any speakers who support Israel or Zionism. It also praised Hakeem Jeffries's selection as House Minority Leader. The Times of Israel called Jeffries "one of the most pro-Israel Democrats in the House". In September 2023, DMFI praised the nomination of former treasury secretary Jacob Lew to serve as U.S. ambassador to Israel.

Following the October 7 attacks by Hamas on October 7, 2023, where Palestinian militants killed over 1,200 Israeli civilians, including women and children, and abducted around 250 civilians, including children, women and elderly people to the Gaza Strip, DMFI's president Mark Mellman noted that "the savagery of Hamas has moved the center of gravity in a pro-Israel direction" in American politics and felt that the movement of American liberals towards supporting Israel after the attack represented "a fundamental shift". Mellman also praised Joe Biden's supportive stance towards Israel, saying that Biden demonstrated "unparalleled diplomatic competence".

After Donald Trump's February 2025 proposal that entailed the U.S. taking over Gaza and displacing Palestinians, DMFI's President Mark Mellman denounced it as "cruel, immoral, and impractical" in a statement. DMFI also called on Republicans to disavow a Heritage Foundation plan to withdraw military for funding for Israel within 20 years, and called on Al Williams, a candidate for the Michigan Democratic Party chair position, to withdraw from the chair election because of antisemitic comments.

In October 2025, following the announcement of the Gaza peace plan to end the war in Gaza and secure the release of Israeli hostages, DMFI issued a statement welcoming the plan, saying the agreement reflected priorities long emphsized by Democratic leaders, including the release of hostages, an end to active fighting, and expanded humanitarian assistance for civilians in Gaza. DMFI president and CEO Brian Romick praised the deal in a DMFI statement, saying, "This is a monumental moment for peace, and we stand together as a nation and a community at this hopeful time." In 2026, Romick said that Vice President JD Vance's historical comments on Israel suggested that his support for Israel was "conditional, not steadfast" and that his record raises concerns about "his reliability, his judgement and the futrue of the U.S-Israel relationship," as well as his ability to negotiate with Iran.

DMFI released a policy framework in October 2026 on the future of U.S.-Israel relations that called for honoring U.S. military aid commitments through the end of the current memorandum of understanding in 2028, supporting a negotiated two-state solution, and urging both Israeli action against settler violence and reform of the Palestinian Authority. Former Ambassador to Israel Dan Shapiro, Representatives Lois Frankel, the ranking member of the House Appropriations subcommittee that oversees military aid to Israel, and Brad Schneider, co-chair of the Congressional Jewish Caucus, all praised the framework.

== Funders ==
Top donors to DMFI PAC by January 2020 included energy executive and philanthropist Stacy Schusterman, the largest single donor ($995,000), and Gary Lauder, who had donated half a million. Donations in the third and fourth quarters of 2019 totaled nearly $2.3 million. According to Federal Election Commission filings, the organization Americans for Tomorrow's Future gave DMFI PAC $100,000 in the early 2020 primary season, followed by another $400,000 on June 5 and June 10.

== See also ==
- Americans for Peace Now
- Conference of Presidents of Major American Jewish Organizations
- Public diplomacy of Israel
- Israel lobby in the United States
- National Jewish Democratic Council
- New Jewish Narrative
- Republican Jewish Coalition
- Washington Institute for Near East Policy
- Zionism
