= Robert Menschel =

American investment banker and philanthropist (born c. 1930)

- Born: c. 1930 (age 95–96)
- Died: 27 May 2022
- Education: Syracuse University
- Occupations: Investment banker, philanthropist
- Spouse: Joyce Menschel
- Relatives: Richard Menschel (brother); Ronay A. Menschel (sister-in-law); E. W. Priestap (nephew-in-law)

Robert B. Menschel (1930–2022) was an American investment banker and philanthropist. He had a 50-year relationship with Goldman Sachs as a partner or senior director. The author of a financial book, and the winner of the 2015 Carnegie Medal of Philanthropy.

== Early life ==
Menschel was born c. 1930. His father was a real estate investor. He had a brother, Richard, who was also a Goldman Sachs senior director and philanthropist.

Menschel graduated from Syracuse University's College of Business Administration in 1951.

== Career ==
Menschel began his career at Goldman Sachs in 1954. When it became a public company in 1999, Menschel earned $20 million in shares. He is now a (retired) senior director.

Menschel was the author of Markets, Mobs & Mayhem: A Modern Look at the Madness of Crowds, prefaced by William Safire. While presenting historical examples of societal hysteria, Menschel suggests picking stocks by focusing on "value investing, [...] a strong franchise, a defined strategy that focuses on a core competency, and consistent sales and earnings."

== Philanthropy and political activity ==
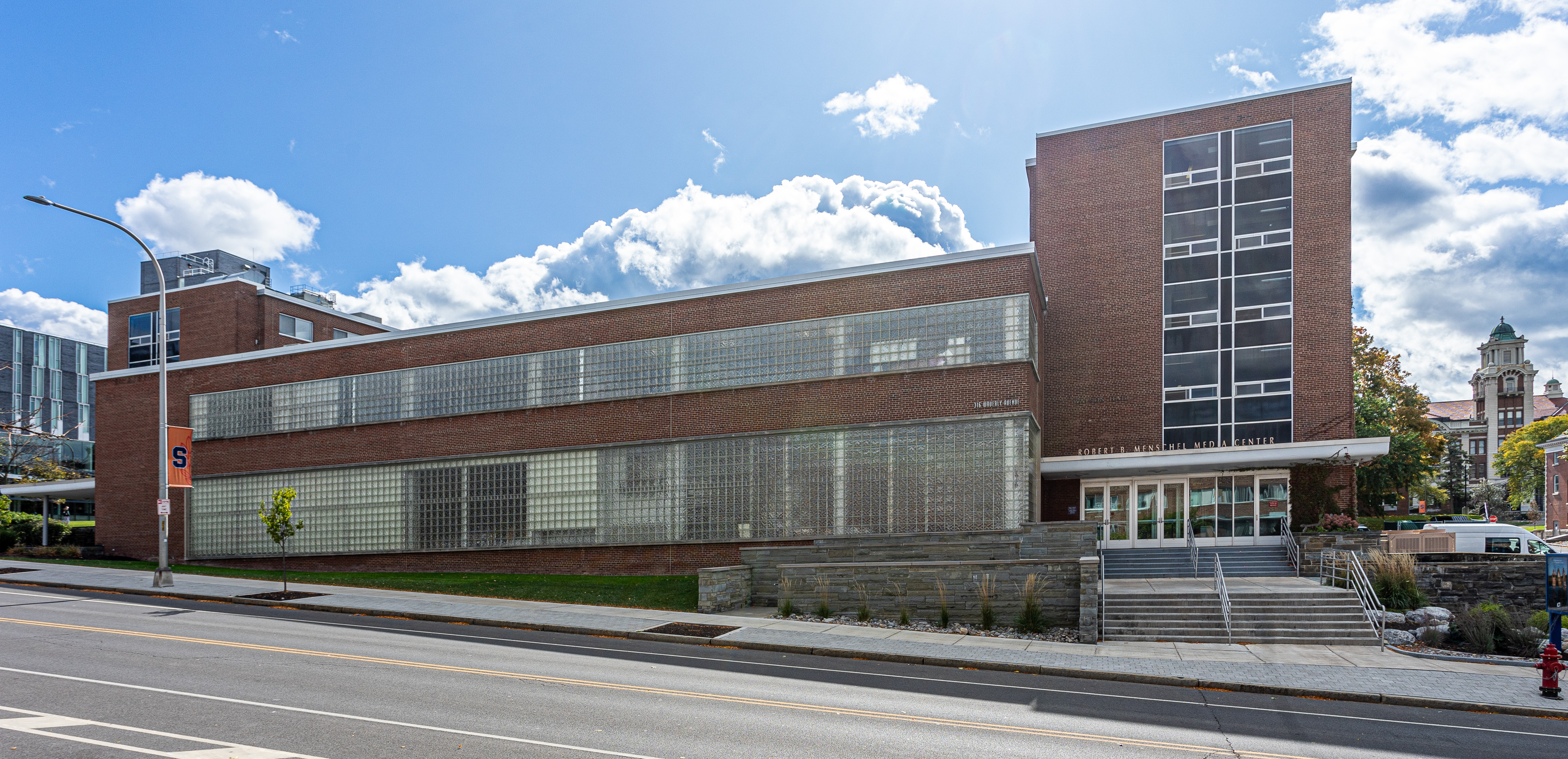
Menschel Media Center at Syracuse University

Menschel was first elected to the board of trustees of Syracuse University in 1981. There, he served as a voting trustee for more than two decades, becoming a trustee emeritus and part of a select group of honorary trustees. He financially supported the Light Work photography center, Robert B. Menschel Media Center, and the Robert B. Menschel Photography Gallery.

Since 1977, he has been at various times the chairman, president, trustee and chairman of the executive committee of the Museum of Modern Art as well as former chairman of its photography committee, where he had donated 162 photographs. He assisted Larry Siegel in founding the Midtown Y Photography Gallery in 1972 as a corridor gallery at the Emanu-El Midtown YM-YWHA on 14th Street.

He served on the board of trustees of the NewYork–Presbyterian Hospital. He was the namesake of The Robert B. Menschel Economics Symposium at the Council on Foreign Relations.

With his brother, Richard, Menschel won the 2015 Carnegie Medal of Philanthropy. Menschel and his wife donated over $700,000 to Democrats in 2010.

He was the former board president of The Dalton School, Chairman of the Board of Guild Hall of East Hampton, Long Island, and a member of Bill Clinton's President's Committee on the Arts and Humanities.

== Personal life ==
Menschel's wife Joyce is the namesake of the Joyce F. Menschel Photography Library at the Metropolitan Museum of Art. He died on 27 May 2022.
