= Voices of Oklahoma =

Voices of Oklahoma (VOk) is an online oral history project dedicated to the preservation of the history of Oklahoma and its people. The oral histories are archived at www.voicesofoklahoma.com for educators, students, and the general public to access for research and study. First-person accounts include a wide range of subjects including ranching, politics, education, business, music and arts, and much more. VOk hopes young people will draw knowledge which may guide and shape their future. The mission statement for Voices of Oklahoma is to preserve Oklahoma’s legacy, one voice at a time.

== History ==
The original idea for the VOk project came to John Erling in 2008 during lunches with his friend Walter Helmerich. Walt would tell Erling many stories about being an oilman in Oklahoma and after allowing Erling to record these stories, gave permission for Erling to put his voice online as part of a new historical preservation project. Helmerich liked the idea of the project so much, that he became one of the founding donors. By the end of 2009, Erling had interviewed 40 people and would launch the website on April 10, 2010. The debut interview was with Wilma Mankiller, first female chief of the Cherokee Nation who died April 6, 2010.

Notable interviews include: US Senator Jim Inhofe, David Green (founder of Hobby Lobby), Roy Clark, Tommy Allsup, Bill Anoatubby (Governor, Chickasaw Nation), actress Peggy Dow Helmerich, Stephen Jones (attorney for Timothy McVeigh), illustrator and writer N. Scott Momaday, evangelist Oral Roberts.

The founding sponsors of the project are Grace and Franklin Bernsen Foundation, H. A. and Mary Kay Chapman Charitable Trust, Helmerich Foundation, George Kaiser Family Foundation, William K. Warren Foundation, and Williams Companies Foundation.

== Book Release ==
In November 2018, VOk released a book titled "Voices of Oklahoma: Stories from the Oral History Website VoicesOfOklahoma.com" authored by John Erling and John Hamill, and published by Müllerhaus Legacy (Tulsa, OK). The book is 206 pages and includes more than 50 excerpts from interviews published on the website. The book is divided into sections organized by subjects that include the Oklahoma Land Run, sports, entrepreneurs, lessons in leadership, and World War II. Featured interviewees include Steve Ripley, Chester Cadieux, George Nigh, Porter Reed, Henry Bellmon, Betty Boyd (Oklahoma Legislator), and Walter Helmerich III.

The book, underwritten by Burt B. Holmes and the Chickasaw Nation, was donated to 230 libraries in the state of Oklahoma.

== Interviewer ==
John Erling, born in Thief River Falls, Minnesota, began his radio career in North Dakota. After assignments in South Dakota, Minnesota and Omaha, Nebraska he moved to Tulsa, Oklahoma, in 1976 to host the morning show on 740 KRMG (AM). He made an early name for himself on the morning show with his references to the “Tulsa Mountains.” Erling spent the next 29 years as the drive-time host of that station and interviewed many local and national figures. After retirement from radio, he spent a few years working in advertising in Tulsa, Oklahoma before launching the VOk project. Erling is a member of the Oklahoma Association of Broadcasters Hall of Fame and the Oklahoma Historians Hall of Fame.
