= Lynn Schusterman =

American philanthropist (born 1939)

- Born: Lynn Rothschild; January 21, 1939 (age 87); Kansas City, Missouri, US
- Education: University of Miami
- Occupation: Philanthropist
- Spouse: Charles Schusterman
- Children: 3, including Stacy H. Schusterman
- Relatives: Louis S. Rothschild (uncle)

Lynn Schusterman (née Rothschild; born January 21, 1939) is an American billionaire philanthropist. She is the co-founder and chair emerita of Charles and Lynn Schusterman Family Philanthropies, and founder of several other philanthropic initiatives.

Born in Kansas City, Missouri and raised in Oklahoma City in a Jewish family, Lynn married Charles Schusterman in 1962. The couple founded Charles and Lynn Schusterman Family Foundation in 1987 to invest in systemic change in the United States and Israel. After Charles' death in 2000, Lynn ran the foundation until 2018, when her daughter Stacy H. Schusterman took over as chair. Since 2018 she has been chair emerita of the foundation.

Through the Schusterman Family Philanthropies, the family has given away more than $3.5 billion. For their philanthropic activities, Lynn and Stacy received the Carnegie Medal of Philanthropy in 2022.

In 2026 Time Magazine named the Schustermans as among the world's 100 most influential philanthropists.

== Early life and family ==
Lynn Schusterman was born as Lynn Rothschild on January 21, 1939, at Menorah Hospital in Kansas City, Missouri to Wes Rothschild and Amelia Mayer. (Note: The Encyclopedia of Jewish Women spells Amelia's maiden name as "Mayer", while Voices of Oklahoma spells it "Muir." For consistency this article uses spelling Mayer.) Her mother was one of the six children of Helen Loewen Mayer and Moses Emmanuel Mayer. The Mayers were the descendants of German Jewish immigrants who immigrated to the United States in the 1800s. Her father was the son of Louis Phillip Rothschild and Nora Westheimer Rothschild. Her paternal uncle was Louis S. Rothschild who served in the Eisenhower administration. Her parents divorced at an early age and she was raised by her mother and stepfather, Harold Josey, who ran an investment company called H.I. Josey & Company. She has two younger sisters.

She was raised in Oklahoma City, Oklahoma, where she attended Sunday school and was confirmed in the local B'nai Israel Reform synagogue. She graduated from the University of Miami in Coral Gables, Florida. In 1962, she married Charles Schusterman, who was of Russian-Jewish origin. He died on December 30, 2000. The couple had three children including Stacy H. Schusterman. The Schusterman family's wealth was largely derived from the oil and gas industry through Samson Resources, which her husband Charles founded in 1971.

== Philanthropy ==
Schusterman began volunteering in the early 1960s with the National Council of Jewish Women. In 1987, she and Charles started the Charles and Lynn Schusterman Family Foundation. After Charles died in 2000, Lynn led the foundation herself, becoming the first woman to lead a large Jewish philanthropic organization. In 2018, her daughter, Stacy H. Schusterman, took over as chair of the foundation and Lynn took the role of chair emerita. Lynn Schusterman's giving is focused on the global Jewish community, Israel and her hometown of Tulsa, Oklahoma. In 2021, the foundation was renamed to Charles and Lynn Schusterman Family Philanthropies. In 2011, Schusterman signed the Giving Pledge.

According to The Jerusalem Post, Schusterman is known for her work in "strengthening Jewish identity, supporting Jewish innovators, expanding opportunities for service learning and promoting inclusivity." Among the national Jewish organizations she supports are BBYO, Hillel, Moishe House, Birthright Israel, Repair the World, and Keshet. In 1994, Schusterman helped to found Hillel in the Former Soviet Union. Since 1998, she has authorized more than $6 million to the Israel Museum in Jerusalem, Israel.

She is a supporter of Teach For America and Teach For All and was instrumental in establishing Teach For America to create a corps in Tulsa and Israel. Schusterman has also been deeply involved in the prevention and treatment of child abuse and neglect, both in Tulsa, OK, and in Jerusalem, where she helped to establish the Haruv Institute.

Among her largest single gifts were grants to Brandeis University to create the Schusterman Center for Israel Studies and to the University of Oklahoma to create the Schusterman Center campus in Tulsa. Schusterman also contributed $6 million to the Schusterman Center for Jewish Studies at The University of Texas at Austin.

In 2020, Forbes deputy wealth editor Jennifer Wang awarded Schusterman a perfect philanthropy score of 5, the highest possible rating; placing her among an exclusive group of just ten Forbes 400 members, alongside Warren Buffett, George Soros, Eli Broad, and others who have each given away at least 20% of their fortune.

=== Activism ===
She has advocated for acceptance of LGBT people in the Jewish community. Her advocacy was criticized by Orthodox writer Nathan Diament as "tramping on the religious liberty of Orthodox Jewish institutions that refuse to condone homosexual behavior.”

In June 2017, Schusterman was one of 65 signatories of a petition criticizing Benjamin Netanyahu’s government for canceling the Kotel compromise and advancing a controversial conversion bill. The next month she criticized the Israeli government's canceling of the Kotel compromise in a speech after receiving the Jerusalem Builder Award from Mayor Nir Barkat.

During the 2024 United States elections, Schusterman was the top donor to political campaigns from the state of Oklahoma with at least $13 million donated. She donated about $5 million to Floridians for Freedom, a group supporting Florida Amendment 4 to protect abortion access in the state. The Tulsa World reported most of her donations went to out of state causes with about $300,000 donated to support a ballot initiative to raise the state minimum wage and $200,000 donated to Oklahoma State Question 820. Schusterman also donated $200,000 to support Colorado Amendment 79, a measure to ensure abortion access in that state.

== Honors ==
In 2000 Schusterman was inducted into the Tulsa Hall of Fame; in 2003 she was inducted into the Oklahoma Women's Hall of Fame; and in 2006, she was inducted into the Oklahoma Hall of Fame. In 2007 she received an honorary Doctorate of Humane Letters from the Hebrew Union College-Jewish Institute of Religion. Schusterman was honored in 2008 with the Woodrow Wilson International Center for Scholars Public Service award. In 2021, Schusterman was awarded an honorary doctorate from Brandeis University, where she had endowed the Schusterman Center for Israel Studies and was on the board of trustees. In 2022, Lynn and her daughter were awarded the Carnegie Medal of Philanthropy.
