= Charles Schusterman =

American businessman and philanthropist (1935-2000)

- Born: 1935; Soviet Union
- Died: December 30, 2000 (aged 64–65); Tulsa, Oklahoma, U.S.
- Education: University of Oklahoma
- Occupations: Businessman, philanthropist
- Spouse: Lynn Schusterman
- Children: 3, including Stacy H. Schusterman

Charles Schusterman (1935–December 30, 2000) was an American businessman and philanthropist based in Tulsa, Oklahoma. He was the founder of the Samson Investment Company, a privately owned oil and gas company with oil field investments in the United States, Canada, Venezuela and Russia. He was a large donor to Jewish causes in the United States and Israel. He and his wife, Lynn Schusterman, founded the Charles and Lynn Schusterman Family Foundation.

== Early life ==
Schusterman was born in 1935 in the Soviet Union. His Orthodox Russian Jewish family emigrated to the United States. He grew up in Tulsa, Oklahoma, where he graduated from Central High School. Schusterman graduated from the University of Oklahoma, where he received a bachelor of science degree in petroleum engineering, and subsequently served in the United States Army.

== Career ==
Schusterman started his career in the oil industry in Oklahoma by entering into an oil field salvage business. In 1961, he began acquiring and operating marginal oil leases. In 1971, he borrowed US$30,000 from his mother and founded the Samson Investment Company, a privately owned oil and gas company. The company was named in honor of Samson, a Biblical figure, as well as for his father, who had died in 1954. His investments included oil fields in the United States, but also in Canada, Venezuela and Russia.

== Philanthropy ==
With his wife, Schusterman co-founded the Charles and Lynn Schusterman Family Foundation. They donated millions to his alma mater, the University of Oklahoma; the Parent Child Center of Tulsa; and the Israel Arts and Science Academy in Jerusalem, Israel. The largest single gift was $10 million, made in 1999, which helped OU buy the former Amoco Research Center at 41st and Yale in Tulsa. The Amoco property, which included 40 acres (16 ha) of land, has since been developed into the Schusterman Health Sciences Center.

With Edgar Bronfman, Sr. and Michael Steinhardt, Schusterman co-founded the Synagogue Transformation and Renewal. Their goal was to revive synagogue attendance across the United States.

== Personal life ==
Schusterman married Lynn Schusterman, a philanthropist. They had two sons, Hal and Jay, and a daughter, Stacy H. Schusterman. He had a brother and a sister.

== Death and legacy ==
Schusterman was first diagnosed with chronic myelogenous leukemia (CML) in 1983. (Note: At that time, there was no known treatment for CML, and Schusterman's doctors told him he could expect only six more months of life. He died on December 30, 2000, 17 years after that diagnosis.) The immediate cause of death was acute respiratory distress syndrome (ARDS). His funeral was held at Temple Israel in Tulsa. The Charles Schusterman Jewish Community Center in Tulsa was named in his honor.

Schusterman was inducted into the Oklahoma Hall of Fame in November 2000.

== External sources ==
- Charles and Lynn Schusterman Family Foundation Charles and Lynn Schusterman Family Foundation.
