= Jew Watch =

Defunct antisemitic website

- Website type: Antisemitic website
- Available in: English
- Owner: Frank Weltner

Jew Watch was an antisemitic website promoting Holocaust denial and negative claims about Jews. The claims included allegations of a conspiracy that Jews control the media and banking, as well as accusations of Jewish involvement in terrorist groups. The site contained propaganda, according to Sam Varghese of The Age, similar to that used in Nazi Germany. It was widely considered a hate site. Jew Watch received support from Stormfront, a white nationalist and neo-Nazi site. The site described itself as a "not-for-profit library for private study, scholarship, or research [that keeps] a close watch on Jewish Communities and organizations worldwide".

The site received media attention in April 2004 when it emerged as the first result in a Google search for the word "Jew" and a petition was started to get the site removed from Google search results. A scandal in 2006 involved solicitations for donations to aid victims of Hurricane Katrina being redirected to Jew Watch.

== Ownership ==
Established in 1998, the website was owned and maintained by Frank Weltner, a member of the National Alliance, a white nationalist and white separatist organization.

== Themes ==
Jew Watch featured articles, videos, and links, organized in the form of a Web directory. Content was organized under topic headings such as "Jewish Controlled Press", "Jewish Banking & Financial Manipulations", "Jewish Communist Rulers & Killers", and "Zionist Occupied Governments – Z.O.G."

Jew Watch claimed that Jews control the world's financial systems and media. It also claimed that the "All Anti-Christian Jewish Red Commissars" killed 100 million Christians in Russia from 1917 to 1945 under the orders of "Trotsky, the Jewish Commissar of Commissars". It said that global Jewry is the driving force behind both global capitalism and communism. The site linked to others which speculate that Jews have committed or are planning genocide against the Palestinian people; the site also promoted Holocaust denial, maintaining that the Holocaust either never happened or was greatly exaggerated.

== Controversy ==
=== Google Search results ===
Many news sources, weblogs, and general information sites linked to Jew Watch creating a Google bomb that led to the site being the first search result for the term "Jew." In May 2004, Steven Weinstock launched an online petition on RemoveJewWatch.com to remove Jew Watch from Google. By mid-2004 the site had collected over 125,000 signatures.

In response to complaints, including one from the Anti-Defamation League (ADL), Google added an explanation to searches for the site. They said their results are automatically ranked by computer algorithms, and that they do not approve of any of the results.

In December 2004, OSCE's Sandy Starr addressed the issues of freedom of speech:

When it transpired that the anti-Semitic website Jew Watch ranked highest in the search engine Google's results for the search term "Jew", a Remove Jew Watch campaign was established, to demand that Google remove the offending website from its listings. Fortunately for the principle of free speech, Google did not capitulate to this particular demand ... Forced to act on its own initiative, Remove Jew Watch successfully used Googlebombing ... Better still would have been either a proper contest of ideas between Jew Watch and Remove Jew Watch, or alternatively a decision that Jew Watch was beneath contempt and should simply be ignored. Not every crank and extremist warrants attention, even if they do occasionally manage to spoof search engine rankings.

In 2013, Jew Watch was still appearing on the first pages of Google Search results for the term "Jew."

=== Hurricane Katrina solicitations ===
St. Louis City Circuit Judge Julian L. Bush permanently barred Frank Weltner and his site InternetDonation.org from soliciting funds in Missouri for charitable purposes after it was revealed by State Attorney General Jay Nixon that Frank Weltner had set up multiple websites soliciting funds for victims of Hurricane Katrina and then redirected those wishing to donate to his site that collected money for Jew Watch. A press release from the Attorney General said:

Anyone who takes advantage of the generosity and compassion of his fellow citizens in an attempt to fund his hate-filled Web site should never again be in the position to solicit charitable funds from well-meaning Missourians.

== See also ==
- Antisemitic canard
- Jihad Watch
