= Richard Menschel =

American investment banker (1934–2026)

- Born: January 6, 1934
- Died: March 4, 2026 (aged 92)
- Education: Bronx High School of Science
- Alma mater: Syracuse University; Harvard Business School
- Occupations: Investment banker, art collector, philanthropist
- Spouse: Ronay Arlt
- Children: 3 daughters
- Relatives: Robert Menschel (brother); Paul Theodore Arlt (father-in-law); E. W. Priestap (son-in-law)

Richard Menschel (January 6, 1934 – March 4, 2026) was an American investment banker, art collector and philanthropist. He was senior director of Goldman Sachs. Through the Charina Endowment Fund and the Charina Foundation, he supported art museums, schools and health charities. He won the 2015 Carnegie Medal of Philanthropy.

== Early life ==
Richard Menschel was born on January 6, 1934. His father, Benjamin Menschel, was a real estate investor. He has a brother, Robert Menschel, who also works for Goldman Sachs.

Menschel was educated at the Bronx High School of Science. He graduated from Syracuse University, and he earned a master in business administration from the Harvard Business School in 1959. He was a lieutenant in the United States Air Force.

== Business career ==
Menschel worked at Goldman Sachs for 25 years. He was a partner by the mid-1970s, and served on its management committee. He retired as senior director in 1988. When Goldman Sachs became a public company in 1999, Menschel earned $20 million in shares.

He also served on the board of directors of T. Rowe Price.

== Philanthropy and political activity ==
Menschel was the managing director of the Horace W. Goldsmith Foundation, which became the Charina Endowment Fund in 1992. Through the Charina Endowment Fund, he has donated over $13 million. With his wife, Menschel also donated $1 million via the Charina Foundation. He has supported art museums like the Museum of Modern Art, the Jewish Museum and the Neue Galerie New York, and schools like Rockefeller University and the New York Law School. He also endowed the Horace W. Goldsmith Fellowship at the Harvard Business School and donated to the HBS Social Enterprise Initiative. He was the chairman of Hospital for Special Surgery, and he has donated to Memorial Sloan Kettering Cancer Center and the NewYork–Presbyterian Hospital. He was a vice president of the board of trustees of the Morgan Library & Museum and served as a Life Trustee there. He was appointed to the New York City Panel for Educational Policy by mayor Michael Bloomberg in 2002. He was a long-time donor to the Metropolitan Museum of Art and the Museum of Modern Art in New York City. He and his wife endowed The Richard and Ronay Menschel Library at the George Eastman Museum.

With his brother Robert, Menschel received the Carnegie Medal of Philanthropy in 2015.

== Personal life and death ==
Menschel married Ronay Arlt, then an assistant to Congressman Ed Koch and now the chairman of Phipps Houses. Their wedding was held at Menshel's mother's house, presided over by Rabbi Ronald B. Sobel of the Temple Emanu-El of New York. They have three daughters.

He was also an art collector.

Menschel died on March 4, 2026, at the age of 92.
