= Muslim Jewish Conference =

The Muslim Jewish Conference (MJC) is an annual inter-cultural, inter-religious conference based in Vienna. The conference consists of discussion committees, guest speakers, dialogue panels and social events. The first annual Muslim Jewish Conference took place from the 1st until the 6th of August 2010 at the University of Vienna. 60 Jewish and Muslim students participated. The second annual Muslim Jewish Conference took place from 3 July until the 8 July 2011 in Kyiv, Ukraine.

== Thematic Committees ==
The 2010 conference was split into three thematic sections:

- Islamophobia and antisemitism
- Education
- The role of media

Additionally, a group was introduced by the conference; the Muslim Jewish Connection. This organization founded by a Rabbi David Goldberg in 2008 focuses on education for youth and adults in the Middle East.

== Patronage & Honorary Committee 2010 ==
The first 'Muslim Jewish Conference' was under the patronage of the President of Austria, Heinz Fischer

The 2010 members of the Honorary Committee were:

- Patricia Kahane, President of the 'Karl Kahane Foundation'.
- Rabbi Marc Schneier, Chairman of the World Jewish Congress American Section, Founder and President of The Foundation for Ethnic Understanding (FFEU).
- Michael Häupl, Mayor of Vienna
- Alois Mock former Vice-Chancellor and Foreign Minister of Austria, former President of the International Democratic Union (IDU), founder of the Central European Initiative (CEI).
- Franz Fischler, former Commissioner of the European Union (1995–2004) and former Federal Minister for Agriculture and Forestry in Austria
- Ibrahim Issa, Co-Director of Hope Flowers School
- Dr Zeynep Taluy-Grossruck, former Director of UNIDO (United Nations Industrial Development Organization), Private Sector Development Branch
- Rafi Elul, Advisor to the President of Israel for social and welfare matters, former Consultant to the Prime Minister of Israel in social and welfare matters, former member of the Israeli Parliament for eight years
- Prof Eveline Goodman-Thau, first orthodox female Rabbi and Founder of the ‘Hermann Cohen Academy’ in Buchen (Odenwald)
- Abbas Khider, award winning Iraqi-German writer (a.o. honorary certificate Iraqi-International Cultic Studies Association (I.C.S.A.)).
- André Heller, Austrian Actor, Singer and Author.
- Mag Dr Jameleddine Ben Abdeljelil, Department of Near Eastern Studies - University of Vienna.
- Susanne Scholl, Austrian journalist and writer, former Head of the ORF-Bureau in Moscow.
- Josef Hader, Austrian Comedian and Actor.

== Guest Speakers 2010 ==
Grand-Rabbi Marc Raphaël Guedj, President of the Geneva-based interreligious Foundation 'Racines Et Sources' (roots and well-springs).

Dr Faouzi Skali, is an anthropologist and ethnologist; professor at the Ecole Normale Supérieure in Fes, Morocco, and author of many publications including "La Voie Soufi" (The Soufi Path) and "Traces de Lumiere" (Traces of Light). He is also the Initiator of the Mediterranean Institute for Dialogue Project and Director of the Fes Festival of World Sacred Music.

Walter Ruby, Muslim Jewish Relations Officer for The Foundation for Ethnic Understanding (FFEU) since March 2008.
