= Paul Theodore Arlt =

American painter (1914–2005)

Paul Theodore Arlt (March 15, 1914, in New York City – September 20, 2005, in Rye, New York) was an American painter. Arlt graduated from Colgate University in 1933.
