= Charles and Lynn Schusterman Family Philanthropies =

US-based philanthropic organization (1987)

- Nickname: Schusterman Family Philanthropies
- Established: 1987; 39 years ago
- Founders: Charles Schusterman and Lynn Schusterman
- Headquarters: Tulsa, Oklahoma
- Key people: Stacy Schusterman (Chair); Lynn Schusterman (Chair emerita)
- Website: schusterman.org
- Formerly called: Charles and Lynn Schusterman Family Foundation

Charles and Lynn Schusterman Family Philanthropies is a philanthropic organization founded in 1987 in Tulsa, Oklahoma, United States.

== History ==
In 1987, Charles Schusterman and Lynn Schusterman, whose family business, Samson Investment, had grown to become one of the nation's largest independent oil and gas companies, created the Charles and Lynn Schusterman Family Foundation.

Giving historically focused largely on the global Jewish community, Israel, and the family's hometown of Tulsa, Oklahoma, but later expanded to support equity and inclusion efforts in the U.S.

After Charles' death in 2000, Lynn Schusterman continued to lead the organization, joined by her daughter, Stacy H. Schusterman. Lynn became chair emerita of the organization in 2018, and Stacy Schusterman assumed the role of chair. In 2021, the family began to use the name Charles and Lynn Schusterman Family Philanthropies for their philanthropic work.

Schusterman Family Philanthropies has been associated with Jewish philanthropy and leadership for many decades. In 2011, the Schustermans sold the family's oil business for $7.2 billion, allowing their philanthropy to massively grow.

== Giving ==
The foundation distributes approximately $400 million annually to a variety of causes in the United States and Israel. During 2020, the organization gave $150 million in COVID-19 relief. In 2023, the foundation gave out $363 million in grants.

=== Criminal Justice ===
In 2021, Schusterman Family Philanthropies partnered to establish the $250 million Justice and Mobility Fund with Ford Foundation and Blue Meridian Partners. The fund supports previously incarcerated people and organizations that advocate for them. They also fund grants through the Coalition to Advance Public Safety to support programs reducing gun violence. As part of its criminal justice work, the foundation supported Oklahoma State Question 820, a failed ballot initiative to legalize recreational marijuana in the state.

=== Democracy and Voting Rights ===
The Philanthropies have funded initiatives such as Fair Fight Action, All Voting is Local, and Protect Democracy to protect voting rights, election and ballot integrity, and increase participation in elections.

=== Education ===
Funding for education grants increased from $42 million to $105 million in 2020 in response to COVID-19. The Schustermans launched the Black Principals Network in 2021, which later folded into the Surge Institute to support leadership opportunities for people of color in education.

=== Gender and Reproductive Equity ===
The philanthropies contribute to the Care for all with Respect and Equity (CARE) Fund, a project of the Rockefeller Philanthropy Advisors that supports advocacy for universal basic income, child care, and care work for people with disabilities and elderly. They also contributed to the Equality Can't Wait Challenge. Since 2019, they have been part of the Collaborative for Gender + Reproductive Equity to support gender equity and reproductive freedom.

From 2020 to 2023, Schusterman Family Philanthropies made significant contributions to Access Reproductive Care–Southeast, a Black-founded abortion fund, and Chicago-based Midwest Access Coalition, however they separated from the organizations following a solidarity statement with Palestinian self-determination. A Schusterman spokesperson said the Philanthropies had "made the strategic decision long before October 2023 to shift away from funding individual funds" and was not politically motivated. The Schusterman partnership with National Network of Abortion Funds "sunsetted" as of June 2024.

=== Israel ===
The Schusterman family are major donors for social service initiatives in Israel, with specific focus in supporting at-risk women and victims of child abuse. In 2022, they supported the construction of a field hospital following the Russian invasion of Ukraine with the Israel Foreign Affairs Ministry.

The Schustermans were among the founders of Birthright Israel. In 2019, they donated $1.5 million to the American Israel Education Foundation, a non-profit run by the American Israel Public Affairs Committee, to fund Israel delegation trips for members of United States Congress.

=== Israel studies ===
Schusterman Family Philanthropies has funded programs and faculty at colleges and universities, such as the Israel on Campus Coalition and Israel Institute, and has directly funded centers for Israel Studies at Brandeis University, University of Texas at Austin, and University of Oklahoma. The Israel Institute was established in 2012 with funding from the Schusterman Family Philanthropies, with former Israeli ambassador Itamar Rabinovich as president, to facilitate post-docs and visiting professorships for Israeli academics at American universities and colleges. According to Jewish Currents Israel Institute fellows are not required to represent a Zionist perspective, but the program and Shusterman Family Philanthropies have been criticized by the University of Chicago chapter of Students for Justice in Palestine for allegedly influencing host institutions and the field of Israel Studies to discourage criticism of the state of Israel.

=== Jewish community ===
The Schusterman Family Philanthropies efforts toward building Jewish community and advocacy include off-shoot organizations: the Schusterman-Israel Foundation, the ROI Community, and the Jerusalem Season of Culture. These emphasize entrepreneur networks, education, and connections with Israel. They are contributors to Repair the World, a Jewish service organization, BBYO, Hillel International, Moishe House. the Jews of Color Initiative, and Keshet, a network supporting LGBT inclusion in the Jewish community.

In 2023, the foundation gave a $300,000 grant to Adamah, the largest Jewish environmental organization. This represented the foundation's first grant to a group dedicated to addressing the climate crisis.

=== ROI Community ===
The ROI Community, founded in 2006, was a signature initiative of the Philanthropies that brought together young Jewish leaders, activists and social entrepreneurs for an annual summit in Jerusalem and year-round programming and microgrants. Over two decades it built a network of more than 1,700 members across 60 countries.

In March 2024, the Philanthropies decided to focus resources on direct grantmaking in the United States and Israel, particularly on combating antisemitism and anti-Zionism. In 2025, it was announced that the ROI program would close after a final summit in 2026. The 'Reality' trips to Israel for emerging leaders, formerly organized by ROI, were transferred to Schusterman grantee iTrek.

=== Tulsa, Oklahoma ===
The Schusterman family contributes significantly to Tulsa-based organizations and causes, and has been recognized for impact in K12 through collegiate education by Tulsa Community College. They are responsible for bringing Teach For America to Tulsa schools, and have supported the Tulsa Regional STEM Alliance, Green County Habitat for Humanity, and Hunger Free Oklahoma.
