= Stacy H. Schusterman =

American billionaire heiress (born 1963)

Stacy Helen Schusterman
- Born: c. 1963
- Education: Yale University (BA); University of Texas at Austin (MBA)
- Occupations: Businesswoman, philanthropist
- Spouse: Steven H. Dow (div. 2020)
- Children: 3
- Parent(s): Charles Schusterman; Lynn Schusterman

Stacy Helen Schusterman (born c. 1963) is an American heiress, philanthropist, and businesswoman who is the chief executive officer of Samson Energy and the chair of the Charles and Lynn Schusterman Family Foundation. The daughter of oil executive Charles Schusterman and his wife Lynn Schusterman, she is active in the field of politics and donated $1.55 million to advocacy group Democratic Majority for Israel (DMFI).

In 2026 Time Magazine named Lynn and Stacey Schusterman among the world's 100 most influential philanthropists.

== Early life ==
Stacy Helen Schusterman was born circa 1963. Her father, Charles Schusterman (1935-2000), was an oilman who founded Samson Resources. Her mother, Lynn Schusterman, is a billionaire philanthropist. She has two brothers, Jay and Hal, who live in Israel.

Schusterman studied in Israel in 1983 before returning to United States to attend Yale University in 1985. Schusterman later received a master in business administration from the McCombs School of Business at the University of Texas at Austin.

== Business career ==
Schusterman started her career at her father's oil and gas company, Samson Resources. She served as its chief executive officer from 2000 to 2011, when she sold it to Kohlberg Kravis Roberts for $7.2 billion. During her tenure as CEO, Schusterman switched the company investments from clean gas to oil, shale gas and tight gas.

=== Samson Energy ===
After the buyout of Samson Resources, Schusterman founded Samson Energy, a deepwater drilling company whose main assets are on the Gulf Coast of the United States. She serves as its chair and chief executive officer. From 2019 to 2020, Samson Energy contributed $2.5 million to liberal groups.

Samson Energy's activities in Cheyenne, Wyoming are reportedly controversial due to their proximity to populated areas. In 2019, the Cheyenne Area Landowners Association voiced concern about the placement of Samson Energy drilling spacing units, which partially fell within city limits. In opposition to Samson Energy's proposed expansion, Wayne Lax, the vice president of the association, cited a study by the Colorado Department of Public Health and Environment that found that fracking sites posed a health danger to individuals living within 2,000 feet.

=== Granite Properties ===
In 1991, with Michael W. Dardick, Schusterman co-founded Granite Properties, a Plano, Texas-based real estate investment company. The company owns buildings in Los Angeles, Atlanta, Dallas, Houston, and Denver. By 2015, Granite Properties had an annual revenue of $182.7 million and 150 employees.

=== Black Coral Property ===
Schusterman is also the founder of Black Coral Capital, a Boston-based clean technology investment firm.

== Philanthropy ==
Schusterman serves as the president of Bezalel Foundation, a non-profit organization which endows Jewish causes, and as a member of the BBYO board of trustees. She also serves on the international board of governors of Hillel: The Foundation for Jewish Campus Life. During the 2010-2011 period, Schusterman endowed the Stacy Schusterman '85 Scholarship at her alma mater, Yale University.

In 2015, Schusterman joined her mother, Lynn Schusterman, as co-chair of the Charles and Lynn Schusterman Family Foundation, "the largest Jewish family foundation in America", with her mother. In 2018, she took over as Chair. During her tenure, she has expanded the Philanthropies giving in K12 education with focus in race and equity, and funding for criminal justice and voting rights.

In the past, Schusterman and her then-husband support the Winter Relief Program of the American Jewish Joint Distribution Committee in Eastern Europe, including Ukraine and Moldova.

== Political activity ==
Schusterman is a top donor for advocacy group Democratic Majority for Israel (DMFI), and donated $1.55 million to the organization. Schusterman has donated to a variety of political candidates, including Democratic politicians such as Representatives Hakeem Jeffries and Shontel Brown and Republicans such as Senators Jim Inhofe and John Barrasso. Schusterman served on the board of trustees of the American Israel Public Affairs Committee (AIPAC). Schusterman is a supporter of LGBT rights and has called for Congress to pass the proposed Equality Act. Schusterman also helps fund National Parent Union and financial donor of most charters in Tulsa.

She supported Oklahoma State Question 820 to legalize recreational marijuana in Oklahoma.

In a March 2024 Jewish Funders Network meeting in Tel Aviv, Israel, Schusterman expressed a belief that pro-Israel advocacy should be prioritized, saying "we need to not shy away from explaining Israel’s story on the Hill and with our non-Jewish friends.”

== Personal life ==
Schusterman lives in Tulsa, Oklahoma. She is divorced and has three children.
