= Bethpage Energy Center =

Power station in New York

- Country: United States
- Location: Bethpage, New York
- Coordinates: 40°44′47″N 73°29′56″W
- Status: Operational
- Commission date: 1989
- Owner: Calpine

Thermal power station
- Primary fuel: Natural gas

Power generation
- Nameplate capacity: 239.6 MW
- Annual net output: 504.0 GWh

Bethpage Energy Center is a power station in Bethpage, New York, United States, consisting of two combined cycle plants opened in 1989 and 2005, and one gas turbine peaking plant opened in 2002. The original plant was commissioned by Grumman Aerospace for its Bethpage complex because it was deemed more cost-effective than purchasing power from electric utilities. It was acquired by Calpine in 1998, which expanded the facility with two more plants.

== Description ==
The facility contains three power plants: two combined cycle plants and one gas turbine peaking plant. Taken together, the facility has a nameplate capacity of 239.6 MW and generated net energy of 504.0 GWh in 2020, making it the seventh-largest power generation facility on Long Island by both criteria. It is operated by Calpine, and the electricity generated at the plant is distributed across Long Island via the Long Island Power Authority's electrical transmission network.

The original Bethpage Power Plant contains two General Electric LM2500 gas turbines, two Hollandaise Construction Group heat recovery steam generators, and a General Electric steam turbine. It has a nameplate capacity of 83.6 MW and generated net energy of 185.2 GWh in 2020.

The Bethpage Peaker uses a General Electric LM6000 natural gas-fired combustion turbine. It has a nameplate capacity of 60.0 MW and generated net energy of 103.3 GWh in 2020.

Bethpage Energy Center 3 also uses a GE LM6000 General Electric combustion turbine, and a Siemens Westinghouse steam turbine. It has a nameplate capacity of 96.0 MW and generated net energy of 215.5 GWh in 2020.

== History ==
=== Original plant ===
The original Bethpage Power Plant entered commercial operation in August 1989. It was constructed for Grumman Aerospace as a cogeneration plant for its Bethpage facility. Under a 15-year contract, Grumman leased the land to a joint venture of General Electric, Brooklyn Union Gas, and the venture management company J. Makowski Associates; the joint venture constructed and operated the plant, and sold steam and most of its electricity back to Grumman, with the excess electricity being sold to the Long Island Lighting Company (LILCO).

Grumman had previously been purchasing power from the FitzPatrick Nuclear Power Plant in Upstate New York, but generating the power locally was seen as advantageous due to the local capacity shortage from Long Island's Shoreham Nuclear Power Plant not opening, and limited power connections to the mainland. It was also initially projected to cost 40 percent less than power received through LILCO, in the wake of increasing energy costs from the utility to cover the costs of the Shoreham plant and damage from Hurricane Gloria.

Calpine purchased a 45 percent stake in the plant in 1997 from Brooklyn Union Gas, as part of the latter's divestment from some power generation interests preceding its merger with LILCO. It was Calpine's first venture in the Northeastern United States. In 1998, the remaining stake in the plant was acquired, and an agreement was made to acquire the land from Grumman. The Grumman facility was being closed at the time.

=== Expansion ===
The Bethpage Peaker opened in July 2002. It was constructed by Calpine on an expedited four-month construction schedule. It was part of a larger program to build peaking plants around Long Island to avoid the risk of rolling blackouts in the face of increased demands like those experienced in California the previous year, and given the strain on the system from a heat wave in 2001. The turbine was under an 80 MW threshold that would have triggered a full regulatory and environmental review.

In August 2004, the purchase agreement with Grumman expired and was not renewed, and the cogeneration activity at the original plant ceased.

Bethpage Energy Center 3 opened in July 2005. It was part of a solicitation for power generation by the Long Island Power Authority (LIPA), LILCO's successor, due to continued high peak demand in subsequent years, as well as the Northeast blackout of 2003 and delays by Connecticut in activating the Cross Sound Cable. This solicitation also resulted in construction of the Caithness Long Island Energy Center; Pinelawn Power Plant in West Babylon, New York; and the Neptune Cable. Most of the land was owned by a private real estate developer; although Calpine had secured a lease from the owner, the New York Power Authority and LIPA decided to acquire the property outright through eminent domain, but the taking was overturned in 2008.
