= Caithness Long Island Energy Center =

Power plant in Yaphank, New York, US

- Country: United States
- Location: Yaphank, New York
- Coordinates: 40°48′51″N 72°56′26″W
- Status: Operational
- Commission date: 2009
- Owner: Caithness Energy

Thermal power station
- Primary fuel: Natural gas
- Combined cycle?: Yes

Power generation
- Nameplate capacity: 350 MW

Caithness Long Island Energy Center is a 350 MW natural gas fired power power plant in Yaphank, New York, on Long Island operated by Caithness Energy. It began operation in 2009 as the first major baseload plant to be built on Long Island in over 30 years, and by 2020 produced the second most net energy generated among power plants on Long Island. A proposal to construct a new unit tripling the capacity of the facility received initial approvals in 2013, but did not proceed and was shelved in 2018.

== Description ==
Caithness Long Island Energy Center is the fifth largest power generation facility on Long Island by nameplate capacity, but the second largest in net energy generated in 2020, behind only Northport Power Station. It is operated by Caithness Energy, and the electricity generated at the plant is distributed across Long Island via the Long Island Power Authority (LIPA) electrical transmission network.

As of 2021, it consists of a single combined cycle unit using a Siemens SGT6-5000F gas turbine and an SST-900 RH steam turbine. It has a nameplate capacity of 375.0 MW, and in 2020 it generated 2171.3 GWh of energy. It is primarily fueled by natural gas, although it is also capable of burning fuel oil.

The site totals 83 acres, of which 81 acres are vacant as of 2018. It is located in an industrial park with very few residences within a three-quarter-mile radius.

== History ==
The power plant was developed as part of a 2003 request for proposal from LIPA for new generating plants on Long Island that was a response to the Northeast blackout of 2003 and delays by Connecticut in activating the Cross Sound Cable, and due to continued high peak demand over multiple years. This solicitation also resulted in construction of the Bethpage Energy Center; Pinelawn Power Plant in West Babylon, New York; and the Neptune Cable.

It began construction in 2007 and began operation in 2009 as the first major baseload plant to be built on Long Island in over 30 years. It is more fuel-efficient and water-efficient and less polluting than older baseload plants in use on Long Island, mainly the ones constructed by the defunct Long Island Lighting Company in the mid-20th century. In 2011, the plant won Vision Long Island's Smart Growth Award for Clean Energy. As of 2021, it is the most recent fossil fuel power plant to be constructed on Long Island.

=== Caithness II proposal ===
In 2013, LIPA selected the Caithness Long Island II proposal for an additional 750 MW plant to be built on the site. It was approved by the Town of Brookhaven in 2014, but was not constructed due to subsequent projections by PSEG Long Island that Long Island's energy demands would decrease in the near future, and a push for increasing use of renewable energy, leading LIPA to not offer a purchase contract for the power. Additionally, Village of Port Jefferson officials opposed its construction for fear that it would make it harder to repower – and easier to decommission – the Port Jefferson Power Station. The village filed lawsuits against Caithness that were dismissed in 2015 and 2016.

In June 2018, Caithness sought an amendment to the proposal for a 600 MW plant using newer technology. Village of Port Jefferson officials again opposed its construction, while Longwood Central School District residents favored it because having a new power plant in their district would likely reduce their property taxes. However, the town special-use permit for the original proposal expired in July 2018, which effectively killed the project.

In August 2018, Caithness Energy sued PSEG, claiming that they made misleading and false statements to LIPA as an anti-competitive practice against approval of the Caithness II plant in order to increase use of power generated off Long Island, including at ones owned by PSEG. The case was dismissed the following year.
