= E. F. Barrett Power Station =

Power plant in Nassau County, New York

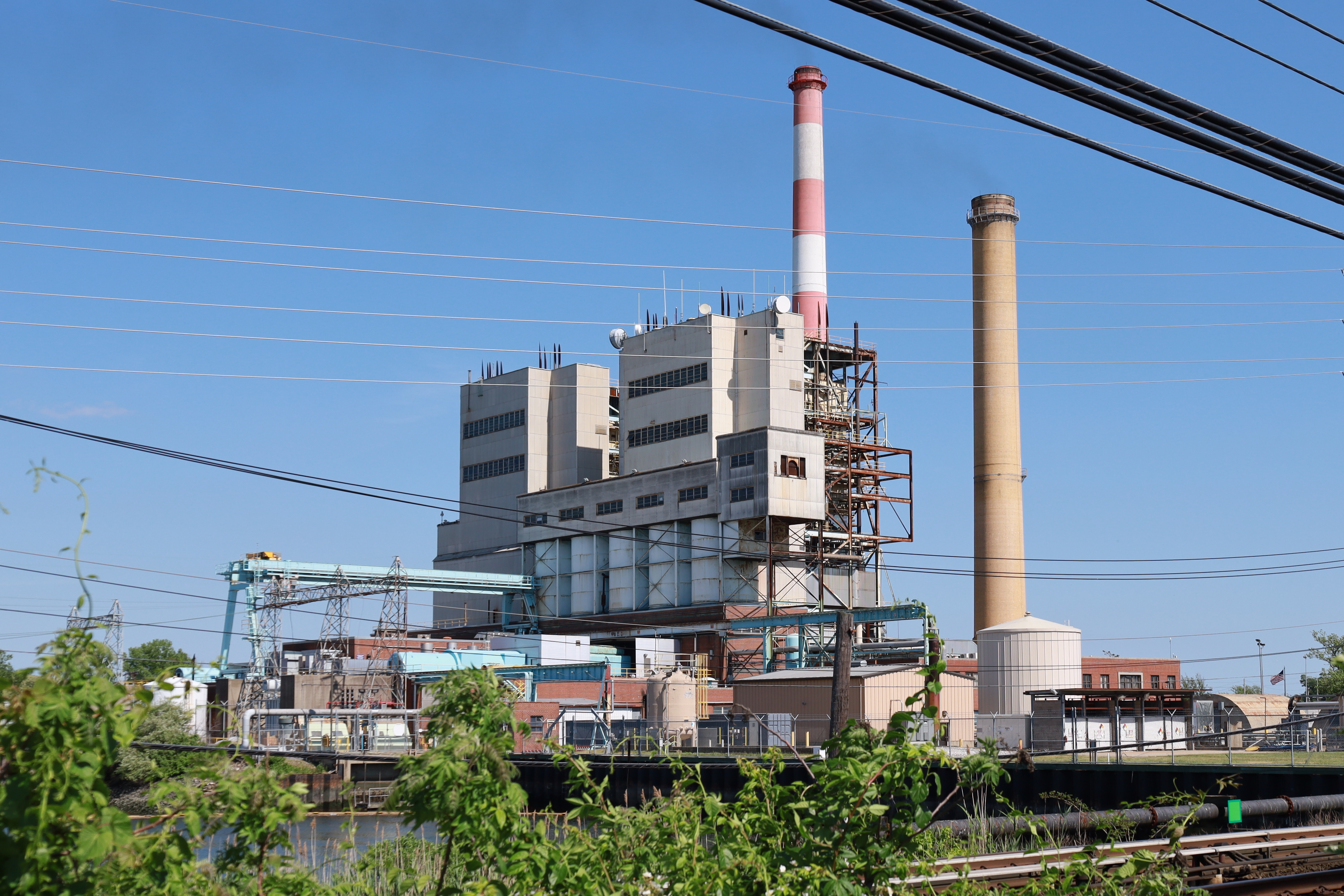
- E. F. Barrett Power Station in 2021
- Country: United States
- Location: Barnum Island, New York
- Coordinates: 40°36′59″N 73°38′51″W
- Status: Operational
- Commission date: 1959; 67 years ago (unit 1); 1963; 63 years ago (unit 2)
- Operator: National Grid USA

Power generation
- Nameplate capacity: 669.2 MW

External links
- Commons: Related media on Commons

The E. F. Barrett Power Station (also known as the Island Park Energy Center) is a power plant in Nassau County, New York, United States. The main plant is in Barnum Island, with outlying facilities in neighboring Island Park and Oceanside. It is operated by National Grid USA.

== Description ==
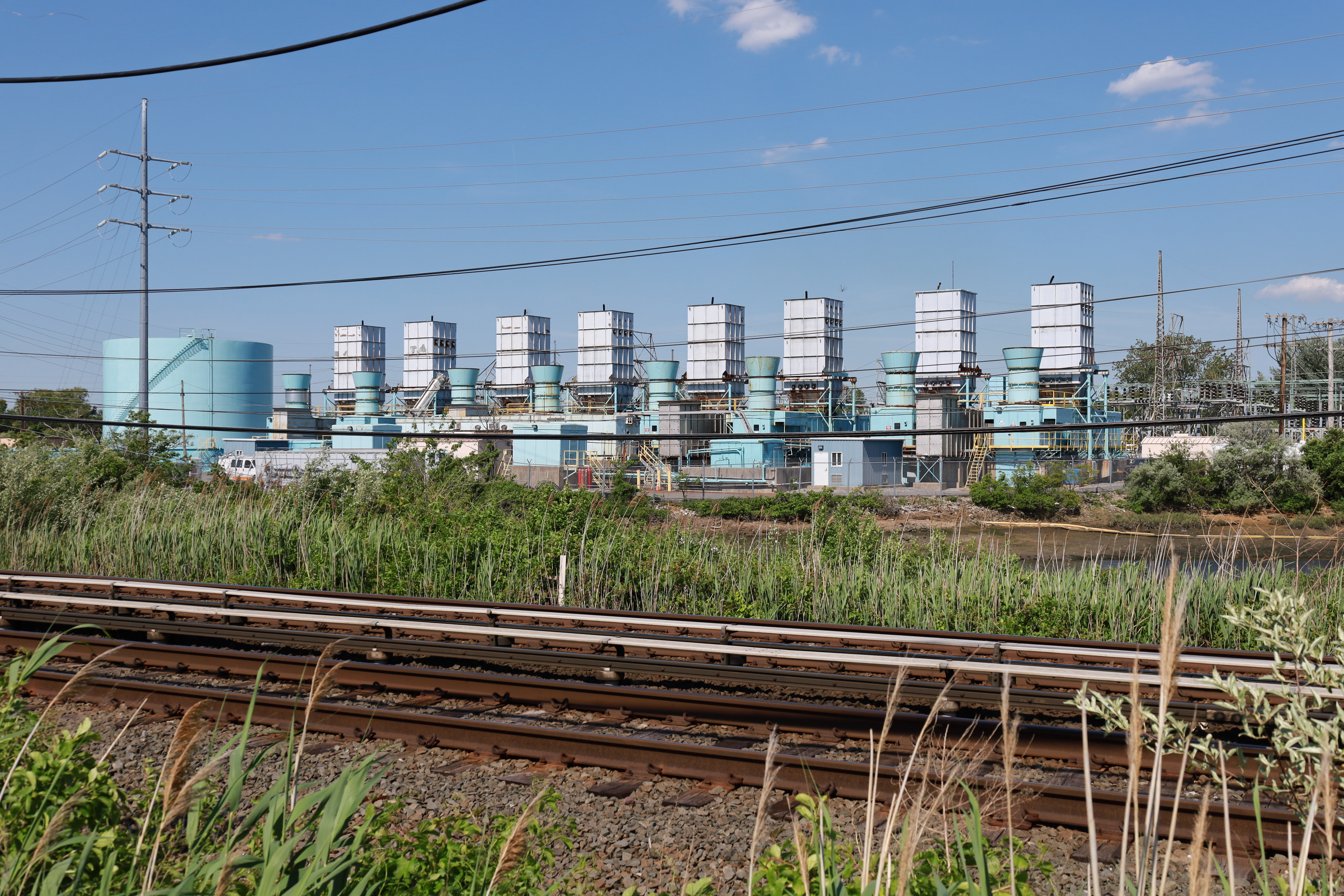
Gas turbine generators within the facility in 2021

E. F. Barrett is the second largest power generation facility on Long Island by nameplate capacity behind Northport Power Station, and the third in net energy generated in 2020, behind Northport and Caithness Long Island Energy Center. It is operated by National Grid USA, and the electricity generated at the plant is distributed across Long Island via the Long Island Power Authority's electrical transmission network.

As of 2021, E. F. Barrett consists of two steam turbine units with a nameplate capacity of 188.0 MW each, as well as eight gas turbine units with a nameplate capacity of 18 MW each and four jet engine units with a nameplate capacity of 41.8 MW each, for a total of 669.2 MW. In 2020, the steam turbine units together generated 1286.9 GWh of energy, while the gas turbine and jet engine units together produced 98.0 GWh. All units are primarily fueled by natural gas, although they also have the capability of burning fuel oil as well.

The Transcontinental Pipeline terminates at the Island Park Energy Center, and the plant draws its natural gas supply from the pipeline. The E. F. Barrett facility is also planned to serve the interconnection point for the Empire Wind offshore wind farm project, after then-State Senator Todd Kaminsky and Island Park Mayor Michael McGinty lobbied for the connection to be moved from the originally planned Gowanus Substation in Brooklyn.

The facility occupies around 127 acres. The main steam plant is in the Barnum Island census-designated place, while a parcel north of Barnum's Channel in Oceanside houses the gas turbine generators, and a parcel across the Long Beach Branch railroad tracks in Island Park hosts fuel tanks. At 350 ft (110 m), the taller of E. F. Barrett's smoke stacks is among the tallest structures on Long Island. The plant's namesake, Edward F. Barrett, was LILCO's president between 1937 and 1953; he died in 1958.

== History ==
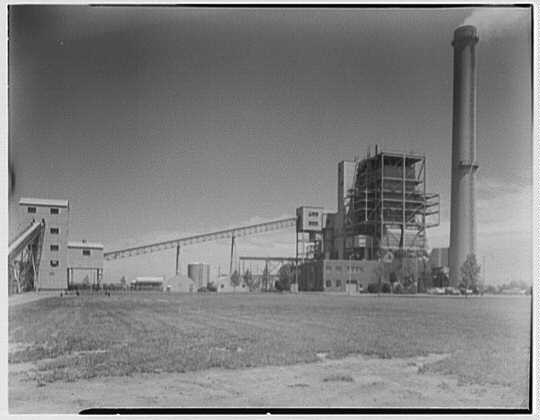
Unit 1 in 1959

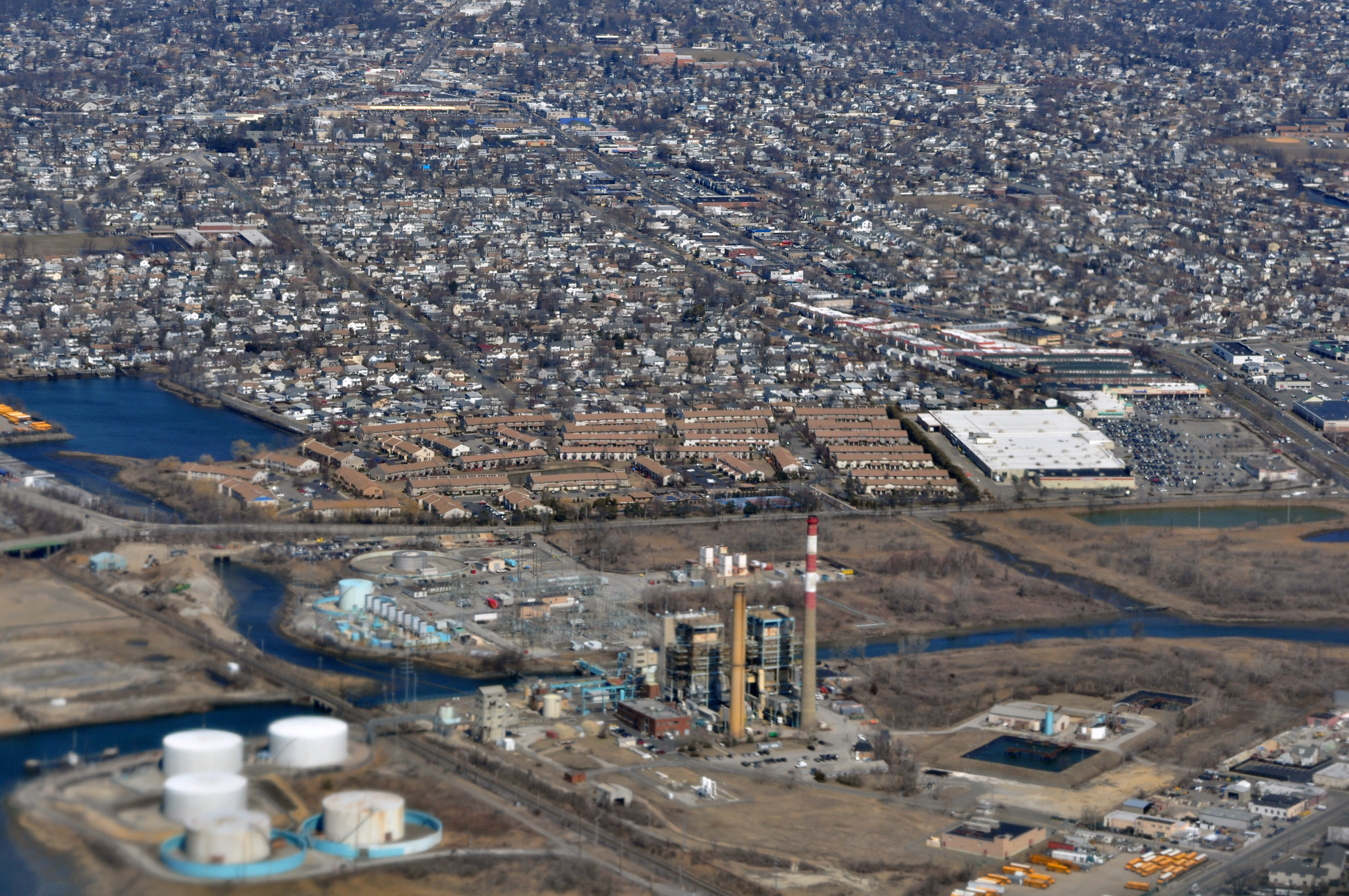
Aerial view in 2014, with Oceanside, New York in the background

The plant was constructed by the Long Island Lighting Company (LILCO). The two main steam turbine units began operating in 1956 and 1963. The first unit was contemporaneous with three similar units constructed at the existing Glenwood Generating Station and the new Far Rockaway Power Station. While both units originally burned coal, they would later be converted to burn natural gas or fuel oil. Two more units were originally planned for the site, but because Barnum's Channel would not provide sufficient cooling water for four generators, they were constructed at the Port Jefferson Power Station instead. Eight GE Frame 5 gas turbine generators began operating in 1970, followed by four Pratt and Whitney GG4 Twin Pack generators in 1971.

In 1998, as part of a state-brokered deal, LILCO's power generation facilities, including E. F. Barrett, were absorbed into KeySpan Energy, with the public Long Island Power Authority (LIPA) taking over transmission and delivery functions. KeySpan was acquired by National Grid in 2007.

National Grid applied in 2013 to re-power the plant and increase its capacity. The proposal was to replace the current units with one or two combined cycle power plants and potentially additional simple cycle peaking plants. However, a 2017 study by LIPA and PSEG Long Island concluded that, while re-powering the plant was technically feasible and would be more efficient and have less environmental impact, the cost made it economically infeasible, and Long Island's power demand had plateaued over the long term. The next year, officials from the Town of Hempstead and Island Park urged LIPA to reconsider the study's conclusion.

E. F. Barrett was also subject to challenges against the power plant's tax assessment. LILCO had initialed challenges against several plants including E. F. Barrett in the early 1990s, but these were dropped in 2004 after they had been inherited by LIPA. LIPA reinstated these challenges in 2010. In 2019, LIPA settled with Nassau County to halve its tax payments on E. F. Barrett over seven years. Island Park School District sued to prevent the deal, on the basis of a claimed 1998 agreement between LIPA, Governor George Pataki, and the taxing authorities that LIPA would not grieve its taxes on the plants, although the suit was expected to fail. Both Island Park and Oceanside School District stood to lose significant tax revenues on the deal, and would have to raise taxes on residents to compensate.

== See also ==
- List of power stations in New York
