= Richard M. Flynn Power Plant =

- Country: United States
- Location: Holtsville, New York
- Coordinates: 40°49′0.04″N 73°03′56.0″W
- Status: Operational
- Operator: New York Power Authority

Power generation
- Nameplate capacity: 164 MW

The Richard M. Flynn Power Plant is a power plant in Holtsville, in Suffolk County, on Long Island, in New York, United States. It is operated by the New York Power Authority (NYPA).

== Overview ==
The Richard M. Flynn Power Plant is a combined cycle power plant containing a Siemens V84.2 gas turbine. It has a nameplate capacity of 164 MW and is operated by the New York Power Authority. It is the ninth largest power generation facility on Long Island by nameplate capacity, and the fifth largest in net energy generated with 564.0 GWh generated in 2020.

The electricity generated at the plant is distributed across Long Island via the Long Island Power Authority's electrical transmission network.

The plant is named after Richard M. Flynn, who had served as a chairman of the New York Power Authority.

== History ==
The Richard M. Flynn Power Plant was the result of a rule change in New York State that required investor-owned utilities to competitively solicit bids on new power generation to lower costs. In 1990, the Long Island Lighting Company (LILCO) requested bids to provide 150 MW of power that would be available by 1994, the second such competition in New York. The New York Power Authority emerged as the winner in part due to its advance purchase of the natural gas to run the plant. Its approval was delayed to examine a competing proposal to convert the built but unused Shoreham Nuclear Power Plant into a natural gas plant. The NYPA plant was built on LILCO property in Holtsville, adjacent to an existing gas turbine facility.

It began operating on schedule in May 1994 and was the first plant completed under the competitive bidding system.

== See also ==
- List of power stations in New York
- Caithness Long Island Energy Center
