= Port Jefferson Power Station =

Power plant on Long Island, New York

Coordinates: 40.9500°N 73.0781°W

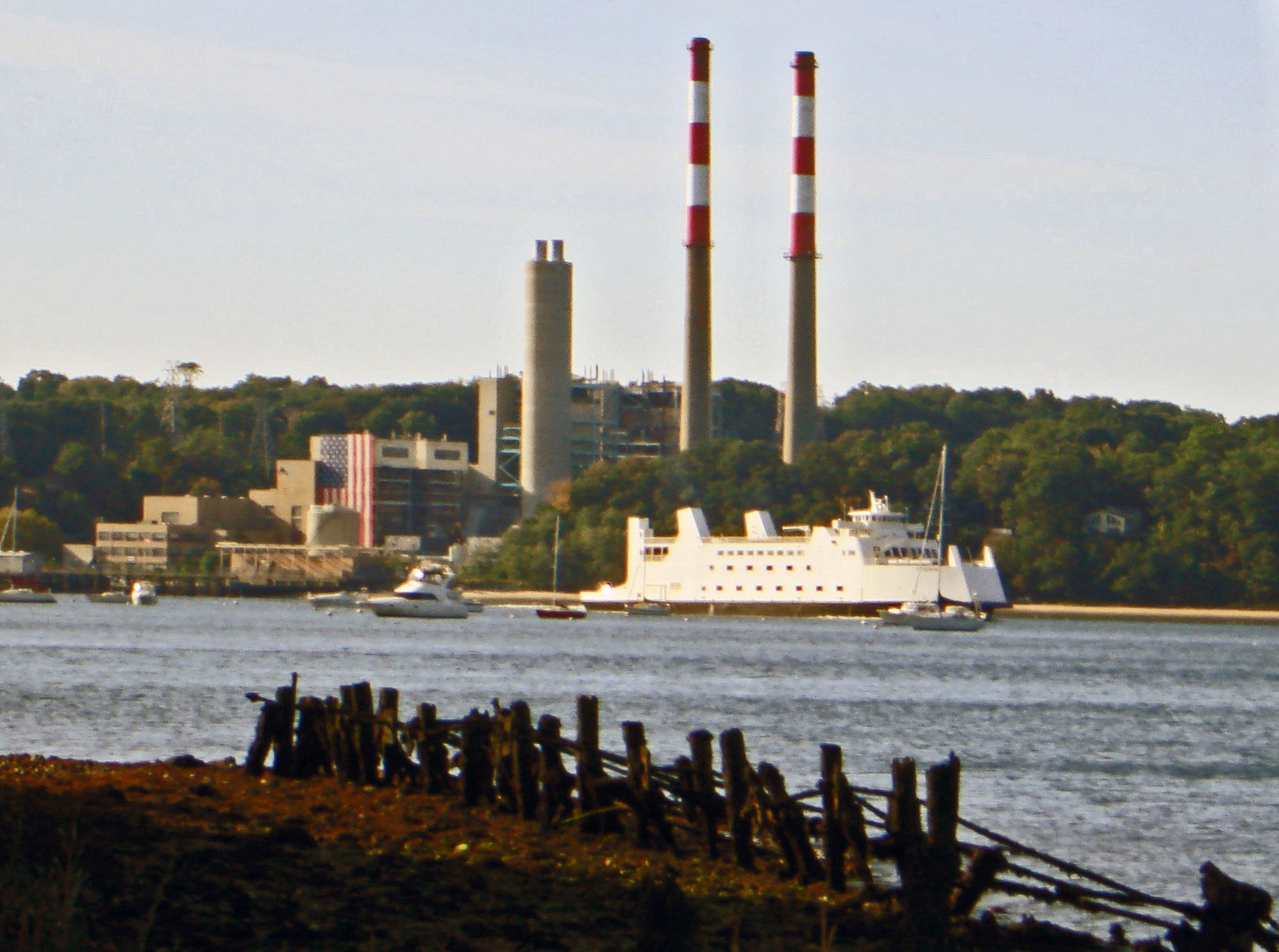
Port Jefferson Power Station in 2010

Port Jefferson Power Station is a fossil-burning power plant in Port Jefferson, New York on Long Island. It is operated by National Grid USA. Its four main steam turbine units were constructed between 1948 and 1960 by the Long Island Lighting Company (LILCO), with the older two decommissioned in 1994.

== Description ==
Port Jefferson Power Station is the fourth largest power generation facility on Long Island by nameplate capacity behind Northport Power Station, E. F. Barrett Power Station, and the gas turbine facility in Holtsville. It generated the sixth most net energy in 2020. It is operated by National Grid USA, and the electricity generated at the plant is distributed across Long Island via the Long Island Power Authority's electrical transmission network.

As of 2021, the plant consists of two steam turbine units with a nameplate capacity of 188.0 MW each, which are once-through cooled with water from Port Jefferson Harbor. The site also contains two GE LM6000 gas turbine units with a nameplate capacity of 52 MW each, and a GE Frame 5 gas turbine unit used for black starts with a 16.0 MW nameplace capacity, for a total of 498.0 MW. In 2020, the steam turbine units together generated 469.6 GWh of energy, while the gas turbine units together produced 80.2 GWh. All units are fueled by natural gas or fuel oil; the flow rate of the natural gas line to the plant imposes limits during the peak summer season.

The facility occupies around 73 acres. At 434 ft (132 m), its smoke stacks are among the tallest structures on Long Island.

== History ==
=== Construction and early history ===
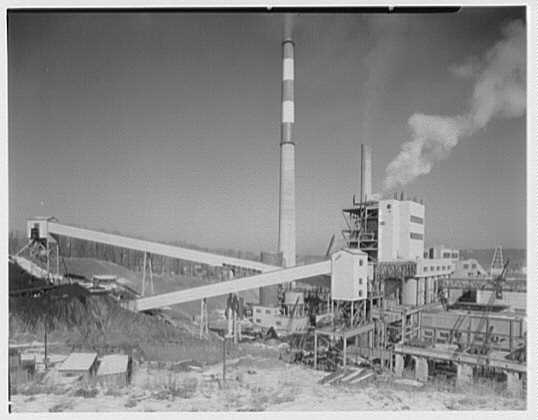
Port Jefferson Power Station in 1959

The plant was constructed by the Long Island Lighting Company (LILCO). Unit 1 was constructed in 1948, and Unit 2 in 1950. The land was previously part of the Alfred K. Woodhull estate. Units 3 and 4 were commissioned in 1958 and 1960. The later two units were originally planned to be built at the E. F. Barrett Power Station, but because that site would not provide sufficient cooling water for additional generating units, they were constructed at Port Jefferson instead. They were initially fueled by coal. The 16 MW gas turbine generator began operation in 1966.

Units 1 and 2 were decommissioned in 1994 but not demolished. In 1996, Units 3 and 4 were given the capability to burn natural gas in addition to fuel oil.

In 1998, as part of a state-brokered deal, LILCO's power generation facilities, including the one at Port Jefferson, were absorbed into KeySpan Energy, with the public Long Island Power Authority (LIPA) taking over transmission and delivery functions. KeySpan was acquired by National Grid in 2007.

In 2001, LIPA proposed building two mini-turbines at Port Jefferson as part of a plan to build ten such plants across Long Island to avoid the risk of rolling blackouts in the face of increased demand like those experienced in California the previous year, given strain on the system from a heat wave in 2001. The pair of turbines was under an 80 MW threshold that would have triggered a full regulatory and environmental review. The adjacent Village of Poquott sued over the lack of environmental review, but the new turbines were completed by August 2002.

=== Later history ===
In 2014, National Grid proposed replacing the plant with a new combined cycle power plant. However, a 2017 study by LIPA and PSEG Long Island concluded that, while re-powering the plant was technically feasible and would be more efficient and have less environmental impact, the cost made it economically infeasible, and Long Island's power demand had plateaued over the long term. In the mid-2010s, Village of Port Jefferson officials opposed construction of a new unit at Caithness Long Island Energy Center for fear that it would make it harder to repower and easier to decommission the Port Jefferson plant. The village filed lawsuits against Caithness that were dismissed in 2015 and 2016.

By 2020, the plant's utilization was so low that it met one study's criteria for being a peaking plant, an inefficient use due to the steam units' long start-up times. Another 2020 report commissioned by the village opposed decommissioning the plant, citing opportunities as a supplement to renewable power mandated by the state Climate Leadership and Community Protection Act, as the center of a potential microgrid operated by the village, or as a site for a new battery storage power station.

Port Jefferson Power Station was also subject to challenges against the power plant's tax assessment. LILCO had initiated challenges against several plants including Port Jefferson in the early 1990s, but these were dropped in 2004 after they had been inherited by LIPA. LIPA reinstated these challenges in 2010. In 2015, the Village of Port Jefferson and the Port Jefferson School District sued LIPA on the basis of a claimed 1997 agreement between then-Governor George Pataki, local school districts, and LIPA not to seek to lower the assessed tax value. This mirrored an earlier suit filed by the Town of Huntington and Northport–East Northport School District about the corresponding situation at the Northport Power Station.

In 2018, the Suffolk County Supreme Court ruled on the combined cases in favor of LIPA, holding that the agreement had been binding on LILCO but not on LIPA. The Town of Brookhaven and Village of Port Jefferson settled with LIPA in December 2018 to reduce the plant's tax payments over the course of the following nine years. The Port Jefferson School District initially decided to appeal the decision, but reversed this decision the following March.
