= Sayreville Energy Center =

Power station in New Jersey, United States

- Country: United States
- Location: Sayreville, New Jersey
- Coordinates: 40°26′20″N 74°20′40″W
- Status: Operational
- Commission date: 1991
- Operator: NextEra Energy Resources

Thermal power station
- Primary fuel: Natural gas

Power generation
- Units operational: 4
- Nameplate capacity: 290 MW

The Sayreville Energy Center, or Sayreville Cogen Facility, is a combined cycle power station in Sayreville, New Jersey owned in part and operated by NextEra Energy Resources. Built by Westinghouse, it opened in 1991. It provides power to the PJM Interconnection and the Long Island Power Authority.

== See also ==
- Red Oak (power station)
- Neptune Cable
- List of power stations in New Jersey
