= Neptune Cable =

Submarine power cable between New Jersey and New York

- Location of Neptune Cable

Location
- Country: United States
- State: New Jersey and New York
- From: Red Oak Power Station, Sayreville, New Jersey 40°28′25.38″N 74°21′11.1″W
- To: Duffy Avenue Converter Station, New Cassel, New York 40°45′38″N 73°33′4″W

Ownership information
- Operator: PowerBridge, LLC

Construction information
- Commissioned: June 2007

Technical information
- Type: Submarine power cable
- Current type: HVDC
- Total length: 65 mi (105 km)
- Capacity: 660 MW
- DC voltage: 500 kV
- Website: neptunerts.com

The Neptune Cable (also known as the Neptune Regional Transmission System or simply Neptune RTS) is a 65-mile (105 km), 500 kV and 660 MW high-voltage direct current submarine power cable between the Red Oak Power station in Sayreville, New Jersey and the Duffy Avenue Converter Station in New Cassel, New York, on Long Island.

The cable carries 22 percent of Long Island's electricity. It was developed by Anbaric Development Partners, and is managed by Fairfield, Connecticut-based PowerBridge, LLC.

== Description ==
The Neptune Cable runs from the Red Oak Power station in Sayreville, New Jersey to the Duffy Avenue Converter Station in New Cassel, New York, on Long Island. It provides a direct connection between the PJM Interconnection's market and that of the New York independent System Operator (NYISO), providing significant import capacity for electricity on Long Island.

The cable is managed by Fairfield, Connecticut-based PowerBridge, LLC. As of 2026, it was responsible for supplying Long Island with approximately 22% of its typical electricity needs.

=== Route ===
From Red Oak Power, the Neptune Cable runs east along the Raritan River to Raritan Bay. It then crosses beneath Lower New York Bay and the Atlantic Ocean, under which it turns north before entering Jones Inlet in New York and turning east to parallel Jones Beach Island, on the eastern side of the New York-New Jersey Bight. It then turns north adjacent to (and paralleling) the Jones Beach Causeway (Wantagh State Parkway) and landing beneath Long Island on the north side of South Oyster Bay. It then continues north underground to Duffy Avenue, roughly following the route of the Wantagh State Parkway.

At Duffy Avenue, the electricity is converted from HVDC to AC. The interconnection's voltage then steps down to 345 kV AC at Duffy Avenue, before connecting with the Long Island Power Authority's transmission system at LIPA's Newbridge Road substation in nearby Levittown.

== History ==
The power plant was developed as part of a 2003 request for proposal from the Long Island Power Authority (LIPA) for new generating plants on Long Island that was a response to the Northeast blackout of 2003 and delays by Connecticut in activating the Cross Sound Cable, and due to continued high peak demand over multiple years. This solicitation also resulted in construction of the Caithness Long Island Energy Center; Bethpage Energy Center; and Pinelawn Power Plant in West Babylon, New York.

The cable was constructed following the Long Island Power Authority's determination that importing electricity would make more sense economically than constructing new power generating stations on Long Island. It went into service in June 2007, by the end of that month.

== See also ==
- Sayreville Energy Center
- Red Oak Power
- Bayonne Energy Center
- Bergen Generating Station
- Cross Sound Cable
- Northport–Norwalk Harbor Cable
- Y-49 Cable
- Y-50 Cable
