= Makamah Park Preserve =

Park in New York, United States

Coordinates: 40.9152°N 73.3162°W

The Makamah Park Preserve is approximately 140 acres (0.22 mi^{2}) in the east watershed area of Crab Meadow Park on the north shore of Long Island, New York. It is bounded on the east by State Route 25A (Fort Salonga Road) and Makamah Road, on the south by the Long Island Lighting Company R.O.W., and on the west and south by the Town of Huntington Crab Meadow Golf Course and marsh.

== Geography ==
The Makamah Park Preserve is located in the Northeast Corner of the Township of Huntington, east of the village of Northport. Officially in a section known as Fort Salonga. The park is bordered in the north by Makamah Beach Road, to the east by Makamah Road, to the south by Norwood Road, and to the west by Waterside Avenue. Some nearby destinations are: Crab Meadow Golf Course, Indian Hills Country Club, Crab Meadow Beach, and Makamah Beach.

== Wildlife ==
=== Birds ===
94 species where recorded in and around the park. Most notable are birds that nest in holes such as Owls and Woodpeckers.

== Hiking ==
Trail Name	Color	Distance (Miles)
Round Pond	Red	.348
Swamp Side	Blue	.630
Farmers Road	Green	.298
Pitch Fork	Brown	.203
Roundabout	Purple	.896
The Staircase	Orange	.300
Cardiac Loop	Magenta	.299

== See also ==
- List of New York state parks
