= List of tallest buildings on Long Island =

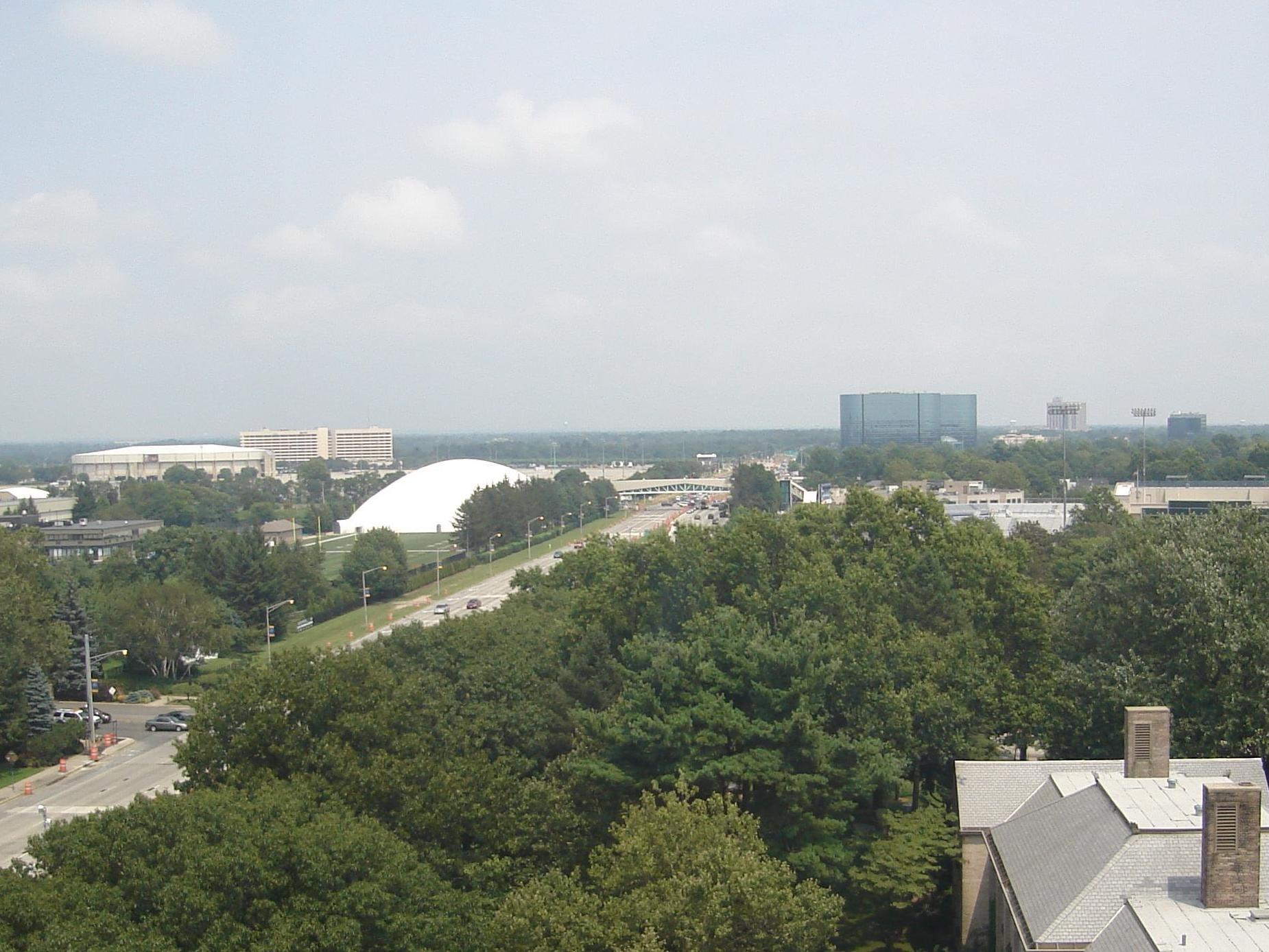
View eastward from Hofstra University's Axinn Library towards Uniondale in 2006. Nassau County's two tallest inhabitable buildings are visible at the horizon towards the right, the Nassau University Medical Center and RXR Plaza (formerly EAB plaza). The Financial Center of East Meadow to their right, and the Long Island Marriott at left behind the Nassau Coliseum, are also among Long Island's tallest buildings.

Long Island, New York, is not known for having many tall buildings. As a suburban region, residents and local governments have generally opposed proposals to construct tall buildings, to distinguish it from neighboring Queens and Brooklyn, which are geographically part of Long Island but are part of New York City. Most of the tallest buildings were constructed by government entities, who are exempt from local zoning regulations.

Long Island has one building taller than 300 feet (91 m), the Stony Brook University Hospital tower, and at least four other buildings taller than 200 feet, including Nassau University Medical Center and the Alfonse M. D'Amato United States Courthouse. Long Island has no cluster of high-rises dense enough to create an urban landscape, although there are regions with a larger number of scattered high-rises. A number of non-building structures are also prominent, such as the 620-foot (190 m) stacks of the Northport Power Station.

This article covers buildings in Nassau County and Suffolk County. Buildings in Queens and in Brooklyn are listed in their own articles, as the New York City boroughs are conventionally excluded from cultural definitions of Long Island.

== Overview ==
Long Island has few tall buildings, in contrast to neighboring New York City. Long Island's identity as the birthplace of suburbia involves a desire to maintain the opposite of an urban landscape, with a flat landscape where high-rises are seen to be eyesores that clash with their surroundings, and even three-story buildings can provoke opposition. This has been characterized as a desire to prevent Long Island from being "Queensified", referring to the neighboring New York City borough. The North Shore Towers complex of three 32-story apartment buildings, immediately over the border from Nassau County in Queens, has been often cited as the kind of development Long Islanders seek to avoid.

It has been noted that as most buildings are lower than the trees, views from the few tall buildings consist mostly of treetops punctuated by water towers. The buildings themselves are generally regarded as being architecturally undistinguished.

As of 1974, there were 107 municipal zoning codes on Long Island, most of which limited buildings to four stories; in 2016 there were 175 zoning and building districts, stymieing the construction of tall buildings. Most tall buildings on Long Island have been built by the state or county rather than private developers, as they are exempt from these local codes. The opposition to high-rises also had a racial element, being stereotypically associated with minority residents.

=== Patterns of development ===
While Long Island has no cluster of high-rises dense enough to create an urban landscape, there are regions with a larger number of scattered high-rises. One is the region in and around northern Uniondale in central Nassau County, including Hofstra University's library and six dormitory buildings, Nassau University Medical Center, Nassau Community College, four office buildings, and a hotel. Another cluster of mid-rise apartment buildings is along the waterfront in Long Beach.

A handful of tall buildings are part of former state psychiatric institutions scattered around Suffolk County, including Edgewood State Hospital (now demolished), Kings Park Psychiatric Center, and Pilgrim Psychiatric Center.

Long Island also has several non-building structures, including broadcast antennas, smokestacks, and water towers. The most prominent of these are the four 620-foot stacks of the Northport Power Station, and other power plants constructed by the Long Island Lighting Company.

=== History ===
In the mid 20th century, Democrats generally favored more high-rises, while Republicans opposed them. In the late 2000s, the Lighthouse Project proposal to construct a 60-story tower, later changed to two 30-story towers, near Nassau Coliseum was vigorously opposed.

The 21st century saw the beginning of a movement in certain regions towards transit-oriented development around Long Island Rail Road stations, with 11,000 housing units approved in the nine years preceding 2016. The villages of Hempstead and Mineola were seen as being particularly receptive to taller residential buildings, along with Great Neck Plaza, Glen Cove, Long Beach, Farmingdale, Ronkonkoma, Riverhead, and Riverside. On the other hand, the proposed Nassau Hub development surrounding Nassau Coliseum is envisioned as a "walkable, engaging suburban downtown" with no buildings over 100 feet. Increasing the number of rental units, which are rare in the region, was seen as important to attracting young adults and thus employers, as well as retaining older residents who might otherwise relocate to Florida.

== Buildings ==
This table lists buildings higher than 100 feet (30 m). A building is defined as a structure with walls and a roof. Antennas, such as the ones on Constitution Hall or the Long Island Marriott are not counted towards the building's height.

Name (Former names)	Image	Height	Floors	Opened	Location	Notes	Coordinates	Refs
Stony Brook University Hospital		360 ft 110 m	16	1976	Stony Brook	Tallest building on suburban Long Island, Suffolk County, and Town of Brookhaven	40.9097°N 73.1158°W	
Nassau University Medical Center		299 ft 91 m	19	1974	East Meadow	Tallest building in Nassau County and Town of Hempstead	40.7261°N 73.5549°W	
Alfonse M. D'Amato United States Courthouse		240 ft 73 m	12	2000	Central Islip	Tallest building in Town of Islip	40.7596°N 73.1906°W	
Jones Beach Water Tower		231 ft 70 m	N/A	1929	Jones Beach Island	Tallest building on the Outer Barrier		
Edgewood State Hospital Building 102		229 ft 70 m	13	1942	Deer Park	Demolished in 1989; former tallest building in Town of Babylon		
Cathedral of the Incarnation		210 ft 64 m	N/A	1885	Garden City	Tallest church on Long Island	40.7122°N 73.7222°W	
Robert Moses State Park Water Tower		208 ft 63 m	N/A	1968	Fire Island			
Kings Park Psychiatric Center Building 93		193 ft 59 m	13	1939	Kings Park	Tallest building in Town of Smithtown		
Hofstra University; Constitution Hall		184 ft 56 m	15	1967	Uniondale	Tallest privately owned building in suburban Long Island		
Hofstra University; Estabrook Hall		184 ft 56 m	15	1967	Uniondale			
Hofstra University; Enterprise Hall		184 ft 56 m	15	1968	Uniondale			
Hofstra University; Vander Poel Hall		184 ft 56 m	15	1968	Uniondale			
AT&T Site Tower (1444 E Jericho Tpke)		176 ft 54 m	11	1970	Dix Hills	Tallest building in Town of Huntington		
RXR Plaza (EAB Plaza)		175 ft 53 m	15	1983	Uniondale	Two towers of equal height		
H. Lee Dennison Administration Building		175 ft 53 m	12	1969	Hauppauge			
Hofstra University; Alliance Hall		171 ft 52 m	13	1966	Uniondale			
Hofstra University; Bill of Rights Hall		171 ft 52 m	13	1966	Uniondale			
Fire Island Lighthouse		168 ft 51 m	N/A	1858	Fire Island	6th Tallest Lighthouse in the United States	40.6324°N 73.2186°W	
St. Agnes Cathedral		168 ft 51 m	N/A	1935	Rockville Centre	Tallest Catholic church on Long Island	40.6598°N 73.6463°W	
Shinnecock Lighthouse		168 ft 51 m	N/A	1858	Hampton Bays	Demolished in 1948; former tallest building in Town of Southampton	40.8483°N 72.5034°W	
Kings Park Psychiatric Center Building 7		160 ft 49 m	10	1966	Kings Park	Height includes now-demolished cube on top; current height is unknown		
Long Island MacArthur Airport new control tower		159 ft 48 m		2011	Ronkonkoma	At left in photo		
Nassau Community College Administrative Tower		146 ft 45 m	12	1978	Uniondale			
50 W Broadway			12	2021	Long Beach	Tallest building in City of Long Beach		
Breeze Oceanfront Apartments			12	2022	Long Beach			
Hofstra University; Axinn Library		140 ft 43 m	11	1967	Hempstead			
Long Island Marriott		135 ft 41 m	11	1982	Uniondale			
10 West Apartments (Avalon Towers)			11	1990	Long Beach			
One Third Avenue			11	2016	Mineola	Tallest building in Town of North Hempstead		
North Shore University Hospital		132 ft 40 m	10	1976	Manhasset		40.7775°N 73.7017°W	
Glenwood Generating Station		125 ft 38 m	6	1931	Glenwood Landing	Demolished in 2015; height excludes stacks on roof of building	40.8277°N 73.648°W	
The Omni		122 ft 37 m	10	1990	Uniondale			
Long Beach Terrace			10	1965	Long Beach	Two towers		
Renaissance Condominiums			10	1985	Long Beach			
Hyatt Regency Long Island			10	1986	Happauge			
Seapointe Towers			10	1988	Long Beach			
Jake's 58 Casino Hotel (Islandia Marriott Long Island)			10	1988	Islandia			
White Sands of Long Beach			10	2004	Long Beach			
Good Samaritan Hospital Medical Center		120 ft 37 m		1959	West Islip		40.6962°N 73.2946°W	
The Financial Center			9	1986	East Meadow			
Montauk Point Lighthouse		110 ft 34 m	N/A	1796	Montauk	Tallest building in Town of East Hampton	41.0710°N 71.8571°W	
Pilgrim Psychiatric Center Building 25		110 ft 34 m	10		Brentwood			
Verizon Building		110 ft 34 m	9	1930	Hempstead			
Pilgrim Psychiatric Center Buildings 81 and 82		110 ft 34 m	9		Brentwood	Two towers		
John P. Cohalan, Jr. Courthouse			9	1992	Central Islip			
Courthouse Corporate Center			9	2003	Central Islip			
Garden City Hotel			9	1983	Garden City		40.7244°N 73.6406°W	
Wyndham Condominiums			9	1989	Garden City	Two buildings		
Morgan Parc Apartments			9	2020	Mineola			
Long Island MacArthur Airport old control tower		107 ft 33 m	7	1963	Ronkonkoma	At right in photo; demolished in 2015		
St. Patrick Catholic Church		106 ft 32 m	N/A	1900	Glen Cove	Tallest building in City of Glen Cove		
Neptune Towers		106 ft 32 m	10	1968	Long Beach			
Belmont Park Grandstand		105 ft 32 m	N/A	1968	Elmont	Demolished in 2024	40.7150°N 73.7228°W	
Republic Airport control tower		100 ft 30 m	N/A	ca. 1970	East Farmingdale	Tallest building in Town of Babylon		
666 Old Country Road		100 ft 30 m	8	1980	Uniondale			
UBS Arena		100 ft 30 m	N/A	2021	Elmont	Most expensive building on Long Island	40.7121°N 73.7272°W	

== Other structures ==
=== At least 300 feet ===
Name	Image	Type	Height	Opened	Location	Notes	Coordinates	Refs
WFTY-DT tower		Guyed mast	681 ft 208 m	1984	Middle Island	Tallest structure on Long Island, Suffolk County, and Town of Brookhaven	40.8897°N 72.9531°W	
WLNY-TV tower (CBS Communications Services tower)		Guyed mast	642 ft 196 m	1985	Ridge		40.8973°N 72.9151°W	
Northport Power Station		Chimney	620 ft 190 m	1967	Fort Salonga	Tallest structure in Town of Huntington; tallest freestanding structure on suburban Long Island	40.9231°N 73.3433°W	
WEHM tower		Guyed mast	510 ft 160 m	1998	Manorville		40.8551°N 72.7691°W	
Sayville Telefunken Mast		Guyed Mast	500 ft 150 m	1912	Sayville	Demolished in 1938; Former tallest structure in Town of Islip	40.7434°N 73.1034°W	
American Tower tower		Tower	500 ft 150 m	2000	Islip	Tallest structure in Town of Islip	40.7518°N 73.2134°W	
RCA Radio Central antennas		Tower	450 ft 140 m	1921	Rocky Point	12 towers; Demolished in 1977	40.9348°N 72.9198°W	
United States Coast Guard Tower		Tower	440 ft 130 m	2007	Hampton Bays	Tallest structure in Town of Southampton	40.8483°N 72.5034°W	
Port Jefferson Power Station		Chimney	434 ft 132 m	1948	Port Jefferson		40.9502°N 73.0787°W	
KeySpan weather tower		Guyed mast	425 ft 130 m	1973	East Shoreham		40.9572°N 72.8825°W	
KeySpan weather tower		Guyed mast	420 ft 130 m	1973	Northville	Tallest structure in Town of Riverhead	40.9864°N 72.585°W	
United States Coast Guard Tower		Tower	415 ft 126 m	2006	Fire Island	Tallest structure on the Outer Barrier	40.6248°N 73.2602°W	
Univision tower		Tower	414 ft 126 m	2014	Islandia		40.8072°N 73.1794°W	
Grandview Development tower		Guyed mast	393 ft 120 m	2006	Hauppauge		40.8153°N 73.1783°W	
Reworld Hempstead (Covanta Hempstead)		Chimney	382 ft 116 m	1989	Uniondale	Tallest structure in Nassau County and Town of Hempstead	40.7390°N 73.5899°W	
Suffolk County Police Department tower		Tower	380 ft 120 m	1998	Hauppauge		40.8093°N 73.2207°W	
Village of Greenport tower		Guyed mast	377 ft 115 m	1997	Greenport	Tallest structure in Town of Southold	41.1094°N 72.3683°W	
WHLI tower		Tower	361 ft 110 m	2006	Hempstead	Formerly two towers; older guyed mast was dismantled in 2025	40.6856°N 73.6098°W	
Optimum Communications tower		Guyed mast	360 ft 110 m	1969	Greenport		41.1097°N 72.3675°W	
Optimum Communications tower		Guyed mast	353 ft 108 m	1969	East Hampton North	Tallest structure in Town of East Hampton; Tallest structure east of the Shinnecock Canal	40.9936°N 72.1714°W	
High-Tower Communications tower		Tower	350 ft 110 m	1993	Farmingville		40.8422°N 73.0397°W	
E. F. Barrett Power Station		Chimney	350 ft 110 m	1963	Barnum Island		40.6161°N 73.6473°W	
Suffolk County Water Authority tank		Water Tower	341 ft 104 m	2006	Stony Brook		40.905°N 73.1131°W	
Pinnacle Towers tower		Guyed mast	329 ft 100 m	1965	Dix Hills		40.7832°N 73.3671°W	
WWSK tower		Tower	327 ft 100 m	1998	Brentwood		40.8023°N 73.2862°W	
Optimum Communications tower		Tower	327 ft 100 m	1966	Riverhead		40.9361°N 72.6528°W	
Optimum Communications tower		Tower	327 ft 100 m	1969	Southampton		40.8994°N 72.3844°W	
WALK-FM tower		Guyed mast	327 ft 100 m	2002	Farmingville		40.8447°N 73.0331°W	
Communications Leasing tower		Tower	325 ft 99 m	1982	Plainview	Tallest structure in Town of Oyster Bay	40.7967°N 73.4631°W	
WLIW tower		Guyed mast	325 ft 99 m	2004	Plainview		40.7887°N 73.4521°W	
WBWD tower		Guyed mast	324 ft 99 m	1969	Islip		40.7523°N 73.2134°W	
Communications Leasing tower		Tower	320 ft 98 m	1975	Plainview		40.7956°N 73.4611°W	
Brookhaven National Laboratory Exhaust Stack		Chimney	320 ft 98 m	1950	Upton	Demolished in 2021	40.8706°N 72.8758°W	
Mackay Radio Tower		Tower	319 ft 97 m	1995	Napeague		40.9983°N 72.0518°W	
American Towers tower		Tower	310 ft 94 m	1957	Noyack		40.9697°N 72.3463°W	
WRCN-FM tower		Guyed mast	308 ft 94 m	1982	Manorville		40.8522°N 72.7647°W	
AT&T tower		Tower	308 ft 94 m	1996	Noyack		40.9697°N 72.3464°W	
Communications Leasing tower		Tower	305 ft 93 m	1985	Farmingville		40.8422°N 73.0258°W	
Stratcap Wireless Tower		Tower	305 ft 93 m	1968	Syosset		40.8217°N 73.4798°W	
Catholic Faith Network tower (Telicare tower)		Tower	304 ft 93 m	2004	Central Islip		40.8032°N 73.2068°W	

=== Other notable structures at least 100 feet ===
Name	Image	Height	Opened	Location	Notes	Coordinates	Refs
Old Bethpage Radio Tower (American Tower)		296 ft 90 m	1954	Melville		40.7757°N 73.4417°W	
Roslyn Fire Tower (AT&T Tower)		294 ft 90 m	1994	Roslyn Harbor	Tallest Structure in Town of North Hempstead	40.8061°N 73.6426°W	
Glenwood Generating Station		265 ft 81 m	1931	Glenwood Landing	Demolished in 2015	40.8277°N 73.648°W	
Wardenclyffe Tower		187 ft 57 m	1901	Shoreham	Demolished in 1917; built by Nikola Tesla	40.9476°N 72.8982°W	
AN/FPS-35 radar tower		>118 ft 36 m	1960	Montauk	Concrete base is 80 feet (24 m) high Dish height is 38 feet (12 m)	41.0624°N 71.8745°W	
Bald Hill Monument		100 ft 30 m	1991	Farmingville	Long Island's only monumental column	40.8482°N 73.0178°W	
Great South Bay Bridge			1954	Great South Bay		40.6761°N 73.2742°W	
Fire Island Inlet Bridge			1964	Fire Island Inlet		40.6322°N 73.2628°W	
