= Northport–Norwalk Harbor Cable =

Northport-Norwalk Harbor Cable

Location
- Country: United States of America
- From: Norwalk Harbor Substation, Norwalk, Connecticut
- To: Northport Substation, Northport, New York

Ownership information
- Owner: CL&P, Connecticut and Long Island Power Authority

Construction information
- Commissioned: 1969 (original cables); 2008 (current cables)

Technical information
- Type: Undersea; Underground
- Total length: 11 mi (18 km)

The Northport–Norwalk Harbor Cable (Also known as the Northport-Norwalk Intertie or the 1385 Cable) is a 138-kV Submarine cable that runs between Norwalk, Connecticut, and Northport, New York, – the latter of which is located on Long Island.

== Description ==
The Northport–Norwalk Harbor Cable travels beneath the Long Island Sound between the Norwalk Harbor substation at NRG's Norwalk Harbor Generating Station in Norwalk, Connecticut, and the Northport Substation at LIPA's Northport Power Station in Northport, New York, serving as a connection between the New York Control Area and the New England Control Area – which are managed by the New York Independent System Operator and ISO New England, respectively – and their respective wholesale electricity markets. It is an undersea 138-kV cable that stretches for approximately 11 miles (18 km).

The cables consist of seven single-conductor cables, with six of those cables operating as a 300 MW circuit composed of two sets of three cables – each having a 150 MW capacity.

This cable system is one of eight high voltage transmission facilities that connect Connecticut's transmission facilities with those of other states, allowing for the importing and exporting of energy.

== History ==
The Northport–Norwalk Harbor Cable was first installed in 1969, allowing a more efficient way for electricity to flow between Connecticut and Long Island, and reducing pressure upon the networks by increasing capacity. At the time, it was the longest underwater electric transmission line in the United States.

The cables were completely replaced with a modern cable system in 2008.

== See also ==
- Cross Sound Cable
- Neptune Cable
- Northport Power Station
- Y-49 Cable
- Y-50 Cable
