= George W. Olmsted =

American businessman

- Born: George Welch Olmsted; May 18, 1874; Ridgway, Pennsylvania, U.S.
- Died: January 15, 1940 (aged 65); Ludlow, Pennsylvania, U.S.
- Occupation: Businessman
- Known for: Founder of the Long Island Lighting Company, 1911
- Spouse: Iva Catherine Groves (m. 1904)
- Parent(s): Samuel Ashbel Olmsted and Frances (Welch) Olmsted

George Welch Olmsted (1874 – 1940) was an American businessman who founded the Long Island Lighting Company in 1911. He was also a philanthropist and led the National Executive Board of the Boy Scouts of America.

== Formative years ==
Born in Ridgway, Pennsylvania on May 18, 1874, George W. Olmsted was a son of Samuel Ashbel Olmsted and Frances (Welch) Olmsted. He was also related to landscape architect Frederick Law Olmsted, the designer of New York City's Central Park.

On June 17, 1904, Olmsted married Iva Catherine Groves.

== Business career ==
In 1911, Olmsted founded the Long Island Lighting Company.

During late 1939 and early 1940, he was a member of the board of directors of the Queens Borough Gas and Electric Company.

== Public service ==
As an adult, Olmsted was active in the Boy Scouts of America. In 1926, he purchased and donated the land for the Chief Cornplanter Council camp, now known as Camp Olmsted. He was the chairman of the BSA National Camping Committee. In 1931, Olmsted received the Silver Buffalo Award for his service to youth.

== Death ==
Olmsted had a heart attack on Friday evening, January 12, 1940, and died at his home in Ludlow, Pennsylvania on Monday, January 15, 1940 at 10 p.m. Following funeral services at his home at 2:30 p.m. on January 18, he was buried at the Oakland Cemetery in Warren, Pennsylvania.

He was survived by his wife and son, Robert G. Olmsted, who succeeded him in February 1940 as a member of the board of directors of the Long Island Lighting Company.
