= Red Oak Power =

Red Oak
- Country: United States
- Location: Sayreville, New Jersey
- Coordinates: 40°26′57″N 74°20′52″W
- Status: Operational
- Commission date: 2002
- Owner: Carlyle Group

Thermal power station
- Primary fuel: Natural gas
- Combined cycle?: Yes

Power generation
- Units operational: 4
- Nameplate capacity: 830 MW

Red Oak is an 830-megawatt combined cycle gas turbine power plant located in Sayreville, New Jersey not far from the South River opened in 2002.

Energy Capital acquired it from a subsidiary of the AES Corporation in April 2012, which, in November 2013, sold it to the Carlyle Group.

Damage to the plant due to Hurricane Sandy in 2012 took it offline line for five months.

TAQA subsidiary TAQA Gen-X owns 85% and Morgan Stanley owns 15% of the tolling agreement for the facility through its with partner. Natural gas is provided by New Jersey Resources. It is part of the PJM Interconnection of the Eastern Interconnection grid electric transmission system. A 2013 report named It is one of the largest single sources of carbon pollution in the state.

The Sayreville Energy Center operated by NextEra Energy Resources is nearby.

== See also ==
- Neptune Cable
- List of power stations in New Jersey
- List of neighborhoods in Sayreville, New Jersey
