= Long Island Power Authority =

Municipal subdivision of New York, US

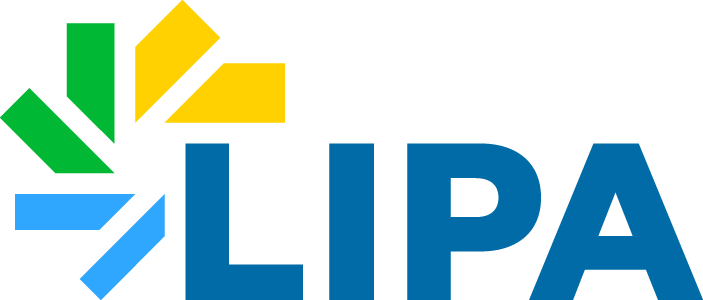
- Company type: Government-owned corporation
- Industry: Energy industry
- Founded: 1985
- Headquarters: Uniondale, New York, United States
- Area served: Nassau County, Long Island, NY; Suffolk County Long Island, NY; Rockaway, Queens, NY
- Key people: Carrie Meek Gallagher, Chief Executive Officer; Tracey Edwards, Chair Board of Trustees
- Services: Electricity
- Revenue: $3.6 billion
- Owner: State of New York (day-to-day operations contracted to PSEG Long Island)
- Website: lipower.org (Trustees) psegliny.com (Customers)

Long Island Power Authority (LIPA, "lie-pah") is a municipal subdivision of the State of New York that owns the electric transmission and electric distribution system serving all of Long Island and a portion of Queens in New York City known as the Rockaways.

== History ==
LIPA was originally created under the Long Island Power Act of 1985 to acquire the Long Island Lighting Company (LILCO)'s electric and natural gas infrastructure. LIPA acquired LILCO's transmission system in May 1998.

Before 2014, LIPA's electric and natural gas infrastructure was run under its own name, though KeySpan operated its electric and natural gas infrastructure under a prior management contract with LIPA until 2007. KeySpan merged with National Grid USA in 2007, and National Grid began operating the electric infrastructure portion of LIPA business until 2013.

Since January 1, 2014, LIPA has contracted with New Jersey–based Public Service Enterprise Group to operate LIPA's electric infrastructure on LIPA's behalf for a period of 12 years. National Grid handed control of the electric infrastructure portion of LIPA business to PSEG at the close of business on December 31, 2013. KeySpan still operates the natural gas infrastructure on Long Island.

== Services ==
LIPA's Long Island electric system provides service to over 1.2 million customers in Nassau and Suffolk counties and the Rockaway Peninsula in Queens. LIPA does not own or operate any generation plants or retail natural gas assets on Long Island, although many generation plants are under contract to LIPA to meet its power supply needs. LIPA is listed as the "Owner, Operator and/or Billing Organization" for 27 electric power generation facilities located on Long Island in the 2018 NYISO Gold Book, for a total of about 5,048 megawatts (MW) of nameplate capacity.

== Organization ==
LIPA is run by a 9-member board of trustees. The LIPA management team is headed by John Rhodes who was appointed Acting CEO in March 2024. Tracey Edwards is the chairwoman of LIPA's Board of Trustees, appointed by Governor Kathy Hochul in November 2023.

In 2017, LIPA had operating expenses of $3.214 billion, an outstanding debt of $3.574 billion, and a level of staffing of 54 people. Although Public Service Law Section 3-b grants the New York State Public Service Commission the ability to review and make recommendations in regards to LIPA's electric retail rates and spending, the NYSPSC does not have the power to set those rates or expenditure levels. It can, however, inspect LIPA's facilities, books, and records. The New York State Public Service Commission runs its own field office on Long Island to enforce this recommendation and inspection capability.

On January 24, 2007, then-governor Eliot Spitzer announced that Kevin Law would replace Richard Kessel as chairman of LIPA until the fall, when a new chairman would be named and Law would become chief executive officer of LIPA. On October 8, 2007, Law took over as president and CEO, but stepped down on September 1, 2010, in order to become the president of the Long Island Association.

== Facilities ==
LIPA owns electric transmission and distribution lines with the following voltages:

- Transmission: 345-kilovolts (kV) and 138-kV
- Distribution: 69-kV, 33-kV, 23-kV, 13.2-kV and 4.16-kV

== Power vendors ==
LIPA does not own or operate any generation plants or retail natural gas assets on Long Island, although many generation plants are under contract to LIPA to meet its power supply needs. The following table lists generating resources in NYISO Region K, corresponding to Long Island, with nonzero net energy generated in 2020:

Operator	Facility	Location	Nameplate rating (MW)	Net energy in 2020 (GWh)	Add'l refs
National Grid	Northport Power Station	Fort Salonga	3945.4	5099.1	
National Grid	E. F. Barrett Power Station	Barnum Island	3945.4	5099.1	
National Grid	Port Jefferson Power Station	Port Jefferson	3945.4	5099.1	
National Grid	Other facilities (gas turbine, jet engine, and internal combustion units)	Glenwood Landing, Holtsville, Shoreham, East Hampton North, Southold, West Babylon, Southampton	3945.4	5099.1	
Caithness Energy	Caithness Long Island Energy Center	Yaphank	375.0	2171.3	
Reworld	Reworld Hempstead	Uniondale	136.1	958.3	
Reworld	Three other waste-to-energy plants	East Northport, Wyandanch, Ronkonkoma	136.1	958.3	
New York Power Authority	Richard M. Flynn Power Plant	Holtsville	223.8	645.9	
New York Power Authority	Gas turbine unit	Brentwood	223.8	645.9	
Calpine Energy Services	Bethpage Energy Center	Bethpage	286.6	539.8	
Calpine Energy Services	Gas turbine unit	Stony Brook	286.6	539.8	
J-Power	Five gas turbine and one combined cycle units	Brentwood, Shoreham, Babylon, Freeport	342	306.7	
Nassau Energy Corporation	Combined cycle unit	Uniondale	55.0	160.1	
MPH Rockaway Peakers	Two jet engine units	Far Rockaway, Jamaica Bay	121	108.6	
Hawkeye Energy	Jet engine unit	Greenport	54.0	51.8	
BP Solar	Long Island Solar Farm	Brookhaven National Laboratory (Upton)	31.5	48.5	
Village of Freeport	Two gas turbine units	Freeport	76.8	10.2	
Village of Rockville Centre	Charles P. Keller facility (internal combustion units)	Rockville Centre	31.4	0.9	

Percentage of local energy generated in 2020
1. Northport Power Station (29.2%)
2. Caithness Long Island Energy Center (21.5%)
3. E. F. Barrett Power Station (13.7%)
4. Covanta Hempstead (5.88%)
5. Richard M. Flynn Power Plant (5.58%)
6. Port Jefferson Power Station (5.45%)
7. Bethpage Energy Center (4.99%)
8. Other (13.7%)

For comparison, Long Island had a peak electric demand of 4,972 MW and New York State had a peak demand of 29,699 MW in 2017.

Most of Long Island's largest power plants are operated by National Grid, which owns three major steam turbine facilities originally constructed by the Long Island Lighting Company (LILCO) in the mid-20th century. In 1998, as part of a state-brokered deal, LILCO's power generation facilities were absorbed into KeySpan Energy, with LIPA taking over transmission and delivery functions. KeySpan was acquired by National Grid in 2007.

Most of the other larger or highly utilized plants are natural gas combined cycle power plants or waste-to-energy plants constructed by other entities between 1989 and 2009. As of 2021, the South Fork Wind Farm project is under construction, and the Empire Wind and Sunrise Wind projects are in planning, all of which are planned to connect to the Long Island power grid.

In addition to locally generated power, LIPA as of 2021 receives about 40% of its power from outside Long Island via the Cross Sound Cable, Neptune Cable, Y-49 Cable, Y-50 Cable, and Northport–Norwalk Harbor Cable. It additionally interconnects with Consolidated Edison's transmission network in New York City via ConEd's 901 L&M and 903 cables.

== Utility Debt Securitization Authority ==
The Utility Debt Securitization Authority is a separate New York State public-benefit corporation run by a governor-appointed board of trustees that is responsible for LIPA's financial reporting. In 2017, it had operating expenses of $122.2 million, an outstanding debt of $4.262 billion, and a level of staffing of 3 people.

== Controversy ==
=== Hurricane Sandy ===
On December 15, 2011, LIPA selected Public Service Enterprise Group of New Jersey, the largest electric utility of that state, to take over management and operation of the electric grid from National Grid, starting in January 2014.

In 2012 and 2013, LIPA and National Grid caught much media criticism in their response to Hurricane Sandy. As a result, key people at LIPA resigned including Michael Hervey, COO of LIPA, who resigned on November 13, 2012 and, though not officially confirmed as a response to Sandy, Bruce Germano (VP of customer service) and X. Cristofer Damianos (member of the board of trustees) who resigned on November 27, 2012, and LIPA chairman Howard Steinberg who resigned on November 30, 2012.

On January 9, 2013, Governor Cuomo called for the transfer of operations of LIPA in his State of the State speech. Even though the governor appoints five of the nine trustees to serve on the LIPA board, he cited LIPA's inability to quickly recover from Hurricane Sandy among other incidents. In May, he announced a plan to give PSEG day-to-day operations of LIPA's electric grid under a management contract. The Long Island Power Authority is the owner of the system and holder of its debt. On July 29, 2013, the state legislature passed a law implementing Governor Cuomo's plan. On January 1, 2014, PSEG rebranded the LIPA system "PSEG Long Island", effectively removing the LIPA name from the public eye.

=== 2013 LIPA Reform Act ===
The 2013 LIPA Reform Act has been criticized by the New York State Comptroller for having contributed to a more expensive and less transparent retail electric service provider in LIPA. The comptroller noted that LIPA's debts have risen since its passage and in the case of transparency, noted that PSEG-LI requested three-quarters of rate case plan documents to be kept confidential, even with the New York State Public Service Commission's enhanced review power. The report from the comptroller's office also noted that the new New York State Public Service Commission's Long Island office is costing Long Island rate payers $8 million a year. A bill was introduced in 2016 that would enhance rate setting abilities by the New York State Public Service Commission. It would have also lifted a provision from state law that disallows LIPA from buying cheap hydroelectric energy directly from the New York Power Authority - see the Green Island Power Authority for comparison. A news article stated that the governor's office was reviewing the bill.

=== 2025 contract ===
On May 22, 2025, LIPA announced it would renew its contract with PSEG Long Island. On that date, the LIPA Board of Trustees voted to cancel the ongoing request for proposals (RFP) process and to extend PSEG's $80 million-per-year management contract, which had been scheduled to expire at the end of 2025.

A special committee of senior LIPA officials had unanimously recommended awarding the contract to Quanta, concluding after a yearlong internal review that Quanta's proposal offered the “best value to the LIPA customers.” The board voted 6–1 against the recommendation, which led to a vote of no confidence in LIPA's senior leadership by the board.

A Quanta executive stated that the company had initially been assured that there would be “no preferential treatment” for PSEG Long Island, which had operated the electric grid for the previous ten years. The board's decision to reject staff recommendations was described as a return to a pattern of organizational instability. The decision was also characterized as continuing a decades-long history of uncertainty at LIPA.

A 150-page evaluation report produced by the selection committee, which reportedly awarded higher scores to Quanta than to PSEG, has not been made public. According to board documents, Quanta's contract terms were considered “materially better for customers than the other finalist’s proposal and than the current” agreement with PSEG.

== See also ==
- Indian Point Energy Center
- Nassau Interim Finance Authority
- Nassau Health Care Corporation
- New York energy law
- New York Power Authority
- New York State Energy Research and Development Authority
- Northport Power Station
