= Empire Wind =

Proposed offshore wind farm

Empire Wind Farm
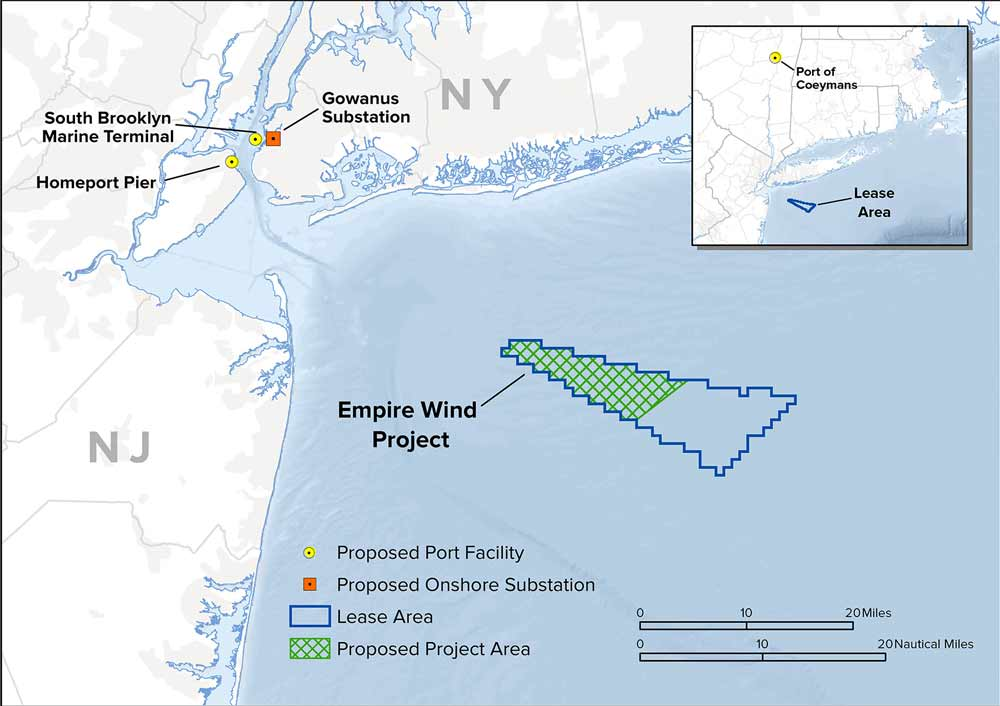
- Map of the Empire Wind lease area (blue outline) south of Long Island, with the proposed project area (green) and planned transmission route to Brooklyn.
- Country: United States
- Location: Lease area OCS-A 0512, OCS Long Island, 15 to 30 mi offshore Long Island
- Coordinates: 40.299°N 73.347°W
- Status: Under Construction
- Owner: Equinor

Wind farm
- Type: Offshore
- Distance from shore: 15 to 30 Miles
- Hub height: 160 metres (525 ft)
- Rotor diameter: 236 meters
- Site area: 79,350 Acres

Power generation
- Nameplate capacity: 2,076 MW

External links
- Website: empirewind.com

Empire Wind is a planned offshore wind farm in the New York Bight off the coasts of New York and New Jersey, U.S., approximately 15–30 miles (24–48 km) south of Long Island. It is being developed by a 50–50 joint venture between Equinor (Norway) and bp (UK), with the project divided into two phases – Empire Wind 1 and Empire Wind 2 – having a combined potential capacity of over 2 gigawatts (816 MW + 1,260 MW). The wind farm is sited in federal lease area OCS-A 0512 (called “Hudson North”) and is intended to supply renewable electricity to New York State, contributing to its clean energy goals.

The first phase, Empire Wind 1, has a planned capacity of 810–816 MW and was originally expected to begin operation by the mid-2020s. Due to permitting and grid interconnection delays, its completion target was pushed back by about 18 months to the end of 2026, and New York authorities now list its expected commercial operation date as 2027. Empire Wind 1 will consist of around 60–80 turbines (each with an installed capacity of more than 15 MW) and will deliver power via a subsea cable coming ashore in Brooklyn. The second phase, Empire Wind 2, is approximately 1.2 GW and was slated to come online later in the decade, bringing the project’s total capacity to over 2 GW (enough to power about one million homes).

Both Empire Wind 1 and 2 were initially awarded long-term power offtake contracts by the New York State Energy Research and Development Authority (NYSERDA) as part of the state’s offshore wind solicitations. However, in January 2024 Equinor and bp mutually agreed with NYSERDA to terminate the Offshore Wind Renewable Energy Certificate (OREC) purchase agreement for Empire Wind 2, citing “changed economic circumstances” including rising inflation, higher interest rates, and supply chain disruptions that made the original contract financially non-viable. This cancellation applied only to the power purchase agreement and not the project itself – Empire Wind 2 was “reset” for continued development, with plans to seek a new offtake agreement under improved terms. Empire Wind 1’s contract was maintained (with revised pricing provisions under a 2023 solicitation), and that phase continues toward construction and operation on the adjusted schedule.

On 22 December 2025, the US interior department suspended Empire Wind and four other offshore wind leases (Vineyard Wind, Sunrise Wind, Coastal Virginia Offshore Wind and Revolution Wind (Rhode Island)) over what it said were 'national security concerns'. Ørsted filed a lawsuit against suspending Revolution Wind. On 12 January 2026, US district judge Lamberth has overturned this construction freeze. He said this project is likely to succeed in the ongoing legal dispute.

== Lease area ==
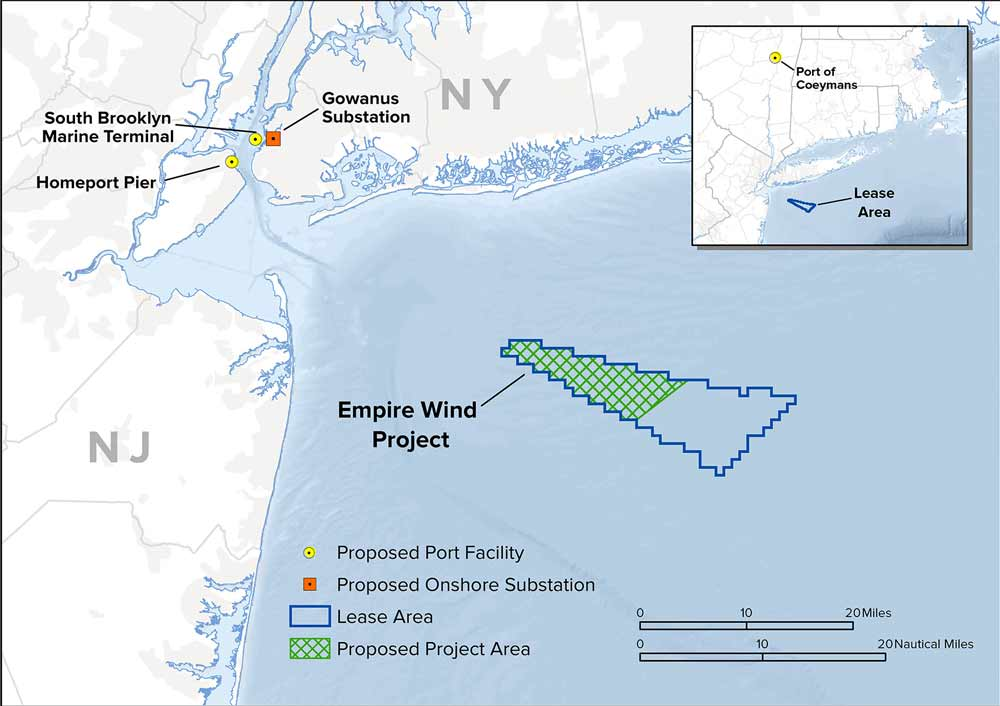
Map of the Empire Wind lease area (blue outline) south of Long Island, with the proposed project area (green) and planned transmission route to Brooklyn.

=== Location and boundaries ===
The Empire Wind project is sited in BOEM lease area OCS-A 0512, located in federal waters of the Outer Continental Shelf in the New York Bight. The lease area covers approximately 79,350 acres and lies about 14 miles (12 nautical miles) south of Long Island, New York, and roughly 17 miles east of Long Branch, New Jersey. At its closest point to shore (near Jones Beach, NY), the lease boundary is about 11.5 nautical miles (~21 km) offshore. The site spans roughly 5 OCS blocks (plus 143 sub-blocks) in a triangular area extending southeast from its western edge, with water depths ranging from about 65 to 130 feet (20–40 m) across the lease area.

=== History of the lease area ===
The New York Wind Energy Area (lease area OCS-A 0512) was first proposed in 2011 via an unsolicited application by the New York Power Authority (with partners LIPA and Con Edison) to develop offshore wind in this region. In response, BOEM initiated a competitive leasing process: it issued a Request for Interest in January 2013 to gauge other developers’ interest, and after receiving multiple nominations, BOEM formally designated a New York offshore wind Call Area in 2014. Federal agencies conducted environmental reviews, including a draft Environmental Assessment (EA) in 2016. Based on stakeholder input, BOEM removed a 1,780-acre portion of the area (around Cholera Bank, a sensitive reef habitat) from leasing consideration. The final Wind Energy Area identified in March 2016 was about 2% smaller than initially proposed, resulting in the ~79,350-acre lease area. BOEM published a Proposed Sale Notice in June 2016, followed by a Final Sale Notice in October 2016 outlining the lease terms and area.

In December 2016, BOEM held a competitive auction (Atlantic Lease Sale 6) for the New York lease area. After 33 bidding rounds, Statoil Wind US LLC (now Equinor) submitted the winning bid of $42.47 million, securing lease OCS-A 0512. The lease was officially awarded and executed in March 2017, marking the first commercial offshore wind lease off New York. Statoil later renamed the project Empire Wind, reflecting its location near the New York “Empire State” coast.

=== Infrastructure connections ===
The Empire Wind lease area is being developed as two phased projects (Empire Wind 1 and Empire Wind 2), each with separate export cable routes and grid interconnections. Empire Wind 1 will deliver power via submarine cables making landfall in Brooklyn, New York. The export cables come ashore at the South Brooklyn Marine Terminal, where a new onshore substation will step up the voltage to 345 kV. From there, underground high-voltage cables route to the point of interconnection at ConEdison’s Gowanus 345 kV substation in Brooklyn. Empire Wind 2, in turn, is planned to route its cables to Long Island. The likely landfall is in Nassau County, with an onshore substation near the existing Barrett Substation (Oceanside, NY) on the Long Island Power Authority system. Empire Wind 2 would interconnect at the Barrett 138 kV substation, linking the offshore wind farm to the Long Island electric grid. These infrastructure plans ensure that power from the offshore turbines is transmitted to New York’s onshore grid via established substation points.

=== Additional Information ===
Lease area OCS-A 0512 is developed by Empire Offshore Wind LLC, a joint venture between Equinor (formerly Statoil) and BP. In 2020, BP acquired a 50% stake in the Empire Wind project from Equinor, forming a partnership to invest in and build out the lease’s wind farms. The two Empire Wind projects under this lease have a combined capacity of about 2,076 MW, enough to power over 700,000 homes. In November 2023, the U.S. Department of the Interior approved Empire Wind’s Construction and Operations Plan, authorizing the installation of up to 147 wind turbines and multiple offshore substations within the lease area. This federal Record of Decision marked a key regulatory milestone, clearing the way for full construction and ensuring the lease area will contribute substantially to New York State’s offshore wind energy goals.

== Regulatory and permitting ==
Empire Wind underwent a comprehensive regulatory review involving multiple federal and state agencies.

=== Environmental Impact Statement (EIS) ===
The Bureau of Ocean Energy Management (BOEM) served as lead agency for the project’s Environmental Impact Statement under the National Environmental Policy Act (NEPA). BOEM issued a Notice of Intent to prepare an EIS in June 2021 to initiate the review, followed by public scoping meetings. A Draft EIS was released in November 2022, opening a 60-day public comment period that ran through January 17, 2023. BOEM published the Final EIS on September 15, 2023, evaluating the construction and operation of up to 147 wind turbines, two offshore substations, and associated cable routes, and analyzing a range of project alternatives and potential impacts on physical, biological, and socioeconomic resources. The Final EIS findings informed BOEM’s decision on the project and included numerous mitigation measures to avoid or minimize impacts, such as seasonal restrictions to protect marine mammals and the establishment of a fisheries compensation fund to offset impacts on commercial fishing.

=== Construction and Operations Plan (COP) ===
Empire Offshore Wind, LLC (the project developer) submitted a Construction and Operations Plan (COP) to BOEM detailing the design, construction methods, and operations for the two-phase Empire Wind project. The COP outlined the project layout and infrastructure, including the number and arrangement of wind turbine generators (up to 147 turbines), the locations of two offshore substations, the routes of submarine export cables, and onshore transmission facilities connecting to the electric grid in New York (with landfall sites and new onshore substations in Brooklyn and Long Beach). BOEM reviewed the COP in parallel with the EIS process. Following completion of environmental review, BOEM announced approval of the Empire Wind COP on February 22, 2024. This COP approval authorized the project’s proposed construction and operations plan (as refined in the EIS) and set conditions for compliance and monitoring during construction and operation.

=== Record of Decision (ROD) ===
After the Final EIS was completed, a Record of Decision (ROD) was issued by the U.S. Department of the Interior for Empire Wind. The ROD, dated November 21, 2023, documented BOEM’s decision to approve the construction and operation of the two offshore wind farms (Empire Wind 1 and 2) within the lease area. It formally authorized the installation of up to 147 wind turbines and associated offshore platforms, cables, and onshore grid connections as described in the COP.

The ROD also enumerated required mitigation and monitoring measures as conditions of approval, in line with the EIS and consultation requirements. For example, the project was required to implement protective measures for marine wildlife and establish funds to compensate fisheries for any losses related to offshore construction impacts. With the ROD and COP approval in place, Empire Wind was cleared to proceed to the construction phase, subject to adherence to all stipulated conditions.

=== Additional key regulatory approvals ===
In addition to BOEM’s review, the project secured several other major regulatory approvals from federal and state agencies to comply with applicable environmental laws.

==== U.S. Army Corps of Engineers ====
An individual permit was obtained from the Army Corps for activities in federal waters. In early 2024, USACE issued a permit authorizing the construction and maintenance of Empire Wind (Empire Wind 1) under Section 10 of the Rivers and Harbors Act of 1899 and Section 404 of the Clean Water Act. This permit covered the installation of structures (such as wind turbine foundations and cables) in navigable waters and the placement of dredged or fill material associated with the project. (Empire Wind 2 is expected to undergo a similar USACE permitting process.)

==== Environmental Protection Agency ====
The U.S. EPA issued an Outer Continental Shelf air permit for the project under the Clean Air Act. This OCS air permit, finalized on February 15, 2024, regulates air emissions from offshore construction and operation of Empire Wind. Before granting the permit, EPA conducted an air quality analysis and public comment process, confirming that the project’s emissions during construction and operation would comply with federal air quality standards and not cause or contribute to any violation of those standards.

==== NOAA National Marine Fisheries Service ====
NOAA’s NMFS completed required wildlife consultations for marine species. Under the Endangered Species Act (ESA), NMFS evaluated the project’s potential effects on protected species (such as North Atlantic right whales), and under the Marine Mammal Protection Act (MMPA) it authorized incidental take of marine mammals during construction. In February 2024, NMFS promulgated five-year incidental take regulations and issued Letters of Authorization allowing Empire Wind to incidentally harass small numbers of marine mammals during pile driving and other construction activities, with strict mitigation measures in place to minimize harm to marine life. These measures included monitoring for marine mammals, seasonal restrictions on noisy activities, and vessel speed limits, ensuring the project meets MMPA and ESA requirements.

==== New York State approvals ====
For the onshore components, Empire Wind required New York State permits. The New York State Public Service Commission (PSC) approved the project’s high-voltage transmission facilities under Article VII of the Public Service Law, which governs siting of major electric transmission lines. On December 18, 2023, the PSC granted a Certificate of Environmental Compatibility and Public Need authorizing Empire Wind to construct, operate, and maintain the necessary onshore transmission cables and substations for Empire Wind 1. In its Article VII decision, the PSC concluded that the transmission project met a public need and that environmental impacts had been minimized to the maximum extent practicable. New York authorities also provided other required approvals, such as state environmental permits and a consistency certification under the Coastal Zone Management Act, to ensure the project’s onshore and offshore activities conform to state environmental standards.

== Finance ==
=== Offtake agreements (ORECs/PPAs) ===
Empire Wind’s revenue is secured through long-term Offshore Wind Renewable Energy Certificate (OREC) purchase agreements with New York State. An OREC contract is New York’s mechanism for buying offshore wind power: the New York State Energy Research and Development Authority (NYSERDA) agrees to purchase renewable energy credits from the project at a fixed price per megawatt-hour (MWh), providing a stable revenue stream to the developers. In 2019, New York passed the Climate Leadership and Community Protection Act (CLCPA), which mandates 70% renewable electricity by 2030 and 9,000 MW of offshore wind by 2035. To meet these targets, NYSERDA conducts competitive offshore wind solicitations and requires utilities to source specified amounts of offshore wind energy. Empire Wind 1 was selected in New York’s inaugural 2019 solicitation, and Empire Wind 2 was awarded in a subsequent 2020–2021 solicitation as part of the state’s procurement program.

==== Empire Wind 1 ====
The 810 MW Empire Wind 1 project initially secured a 25-year OREC offtake contract with NYSERDA after the 2019 solicitation. The original strike price was approximately $118.38 per MWh. However, by 2023 the developers (Equinor and BP) warned that global inflation and supply chain disruptions had made the project economically unviable under the original pricing. New York regulators declined to amend the contract rates, instead opting to rebid the project in an expedited 2024 offshore wind solicitation. In June 2024, NYSERDA finalized a new Purchase and Sale Agreement for Empire Wind 1 at a strike price of $155.00 per MWh over a 25-year term. NYSERDA is the contract counterparty, purchasing ORECs on behalf of New York’s utilities and ratepayers. The offtake agreement covers the full output of Empire Wind 1, which is planned to deliver first power in late 2026 and eventually supply about 500,000 New York homes with electricity. The updated contract also includes local content provisions; for example, Empire Wind 1 must purchase at least $188 million of U.S.-sourced iron and steel, in line with New York’s “Buy American” requirements.

==== Empire Wind 2 ====
The second phase, Empire Wind 2 (1,260 MW), was awarded an OREC agreement in early 2021 as part of New York’s offshore wind Solicitation 2. This contract similarly entailed a ~25-year term for selling ORECs to NYSERDA. In late 2023, facing the same cost escalations, Equinor and BP requested a pricing adjustment for Empire Wind 2’s OREC contract. After the state refused to revise the terms, the developers and NYSERDA mutually agreed to terminate the Empire Wind 2 OREC agreement in January 2024. Equinor and BP cited inflation, rising interest rates, and supply chain disruptions that rendered the original contract financially untenable. The termination repositions Empire Wind 2 to continue development in anticipation of new offtake opportunities rather than canceling the project outright. As of 2024, Empire Wind 2 remains under development but without a finalized offtake deal. The developers signaled intent to rebid or seek a new power purchase agreement in a future solicitation once market conditions and contract terms are more favorable.

=== Project financing ===
Empire Wind 1 and 2 represent a multi-billion-dollar investment in offshore wind infrastructure. Empire Wind 1 is being financed through a combination of equity from its developers and external debt raised via project financing. In 2024, following the new OREC contract, Equinor (the project developer) made a final investment decision (FID) on Empire Wind 1 and commenced full construction on the 810 MW wind farm. By the end of 2024, the project achieved financial close on a debt financing package of over US $3 billion. The total capital cost for Empire Wind 1 is estimated at approximately $5 billion, which includes expenditures for port facilities and is calculated with the benefit of federal tax credits (the project expects to utilize the Investment Tax Credit, ITC). The financing structure leverages the 25-year NYSERDA OREC contract (at $155/MWh) to provide revenue certainty for lenders. Equinor has stated it intends to “farm down” Empire Wind 1 by selling a stake to a new partner, which will bring in additional equity investment and reduce Equinor’s financial exposure.

Empire Wind’s ownership and investor composition have evolved during development. Initially, the projects were a 50–50 joint venture between Equinor (a Norwegian energy company) and BP (British multinational oil & gas company). In January 2024, Equinor and BP agreed to a swap of lease assets: Equinor took full ownership of the Empire Wind lease (covering Empire Wind 1 and 2), while BP took full ownership of the separate Beacon Wind project. This transaction made Equinor the sole owner and operator of Empire Wind. Following the swap, Equinor is expected to bring in new investors at the project level for Empire Wind 1 (through the planned equity sell-down). For Empire Wind 2, major capital investments will be contingent on securing a new offtake agreement. No final investment decision or financing had been reached for Empire Wind 2 as of 2024, and the schedule for financial close will be revisited once the project obtains a viable revenue contract. Equinor continues to fund development work for Empire Wind 2 in the interim, keeping the option to finance and build the project when market conditions allow.

Both Empire Wind projects are supported by government incentives designed to lower costs. Under U.S. federal law (as augmented by the 2022 Inflation Reduction Act), offshore wind projects qualify for an ITC of up to 30% of capital expenditures, and potentially bonus credits for meeting domestic content or siting in energy communities. The Empire Wind projects include local economic development commitments such as:

- South Brooklyn Marine Terminal (SBMT) – Redevelopment of a 70-acre port in Brooklyn to serve as a staging and assembly hub for turbine installation (creating an estimated 400 construction jobs).
- Port of Coeymans (Albany area) – Over $80 million in new construction and manufacturing facilities for advanced turbine foundation components at the Port of Coeymans on the Hudson River. This investment supports a regional supply chain by producing large steel components in-state.
- Long Island Transmission Upgrades – Approximately $135 million in local grid upgrades on Long Island and $200 million in related transmission system investments to integrate the offshore wind power into New York’s electric grid. These upgrades are coordinated with New York’s utilities under project-specific labor agreements and are partly financed through the project’s budget.

These financing and investment measures ensure that Empire Wind 1 and 2 have the necessary capital and infrastructure to proceed. Empire Wind 1, with its secured OREC contract and financing, is on track to become one of the first utility-scale offshore wind farms serving New York City. Empire Wind 2’s future financing will depend on forthcoming power contract opportunities, but the groundwork in permits and grid interconnection remains underway to enable a quick restart once a new offtake deal is in place.

== Infrastructure development ==
=== Offshore Wind farm ===
Empire Wind is being developed in two phases—Empire Wind 1 and Empire Wind 2—with a combined capacity of approximately 2.1 GW. The project will feature 138 Vestas V236-15 MW wind turbines mounted on monopile foundations. These turbines have rotor diameters of about 236 m and tip heights around 270 m, making them among the largest in use. The wind farm is located in the New York Bight, roughly 15–30 miles (24–48 km) south of Long Island, within an 80,000-acre federal lease area. Power from the turbines will be collected at offshore substations via inter-array cables (IACs). The project includes two offshore substations, with each phase having its own network of IACs (approximately 214 km for Empire Wind 1 and 267 km for Empire Wind 2) linking the turbines to the substations. The inter-array cables are planned to be buried about 4–6 ft (1.2–1.8 m) below the seabed for protection from fishing gear and marine traffic. The turbines will be arranged in a grid-like pattern within the lease area, spaced to minimize wake effects and accommodate navigational corridors. The fixed-bottom monopile foundations were chosen for all wind turbine generators due to their proven reliability, suitability for the site’s 23–41 m water depths, and relatively lower seabed disturbance compared to alternatives. Each monopile is a large steel cylinder driven into the seabed to provide support for the turbine tower. The design envelope approved by regulators allowed for up to 147 turbine positions, but the selection of 15 MW units enabled the project to meet its capacity with fewer turbines. In addition to the turbines, the offshore scope includes the installation of two substations (also on fixed foundations) and several array cable corridors optimized for the site’s conditions. The configuration balances efficient energy production with considerations for marine habitat and shipping lanes in the busy New York Harbor approach.

=== Grid interconnection ===
==== Export cables ====
Electricity from Empire Wind will reach shore through high-voltage submarine export cables, which connect the offshore substations to onshore landing points. For Empire Wind 1, two 230 kV export cables will run in parallel along a ~15 mile (24 km) route from the wind farm toward New York City. These cables make landfall at the South Brooklyn Marine Terminal (SBMT) in Brooklyn. Similarly, Empire Wind 2 will use three 230 kV export cables coming ashore at Long Beach on Long Island. All submarine export cables are planned to be buried to a target depth of about 6 ft (1.8 m) beneath the seabed to avoid interference with vessel anchors and fishing equipment. The total length of export cabling for both phases is up to 122 km (including both offshore and near-shore segments) as defined in the project’s design envelope.

==== Onshore Substations and POI ====
At SBMT in Brooklyn, the Empire Wind 1 export cables will transition from sea to land and connect to an onshore substation built on the port site. This SBMT onshore substation will step up the voltage from 230 kV to 345 kV for transmission into the regional grid. From there, two 345 kV underground circuits (each consisting of three single-core cables) will carry the power approximately 0.3 mi (0.5 km) to the point of interconnection (POI) at ConEdison’s Gowanus 345 kV substation in Brooklyn. This configuration makes Empire Wind 1 the first offshore wind project to deliver power directly into New York City’s electricity grid. For Empire Wind 2, the cables come ashore at a Long Beach landfall site in Nassau County. They connect to a new onshore substation in the Village of Island Park (Town of Hempstead), where the voltage is stepped up to 345 kV. From the Island Park substation, up to three 345 kV cable circuits run about 1.7 mi (2.8 km) to the POI at the E.F. Barrett Power Station (Oceanside), part of the Long Island Power Authority (LIPA) grid. At the Barrett facility, the power is ultimately tied into Long Island’s 138 kV system to serve customers. Both onshore substations (SBMT and Island Park) include heavy electrical transformers and switchgear to manage the voltage conversion and grid integration. The Empire Wind project considered multiple interconnection options during planning – up to three potential landfall sites and onshore routes were evaluated for feasibility and environmental impact. These alternatives included different cable route alignments and POIs in the New York City and Long Island area. After analysis, the chosen configuration split the output between a New York City grid connection (Brooklyn) and a Long Island grid connection, which helped optimize use of existing infrastructure while minimizing cable lengths and environmental constraints.

=== Port development ===
==== South Brooklyn Marine Terminal (SBMT) ====
A significant portion of Empire Wind’s infrastructure investment is directed toward upgrading port facilities in New York. The South Brooklyn Marine Terminal in Sunset Park, Brooklyn, is being transformed into a world-class offshore wind staging and assembly hub. Equinor (Empire Wind’s developer) and its partner have committed to extensive upgrades at the 73-acre terminal to support the construction and operation of the wind farm. SBMT will serve as the primary staging site where major wind turbine components (nacelles, blades, and tower sections) are marshaled and pre-assembled before being transported to the offshore site. The port infrastructure is being reinforced to accommodate heavy lift cranes, storage of large components, and jack-up installation vessels. SBMT will also host the project’s onshore substation and a new operations and maintenance (O&M) base for Empire Wind. Once constructed, this facility will be one of the largest dedicated offshore wind ports in the United States, capable of handling turbine staging and assembly at the scale required by modern 12–15 MW class turbines. In 2024, ground was broken at SBMT for these upgrades, which are expected to create hundreds of jobs and establish New York City as a key hub for the offshore wind industry. The SBMT port improvements include new quay infrastructure, deepening of berths, and an 85,000 sq ft O&M building with warehouses and offices to support long-term wind farm operations.

==== Port of Albany Manufacturing Facility ====
Upstate New York is also involved in the project’s supply chain through the Port of Albany. Empire Wind is backing the development of the nation’s first offshore wind turbine tower and transition piece manufacturing facility at the Port of Albany–Rensselaer on the Hudson River. In partnership with experienced fabricators Marmen and Welcon, this new factory will produce steel tower sections (and potentially other components) for the Empire Wind turbines. The manufacturing site is expected to create up to 350 direct jobs and establish the Capital Region as an offshore wind manufacturing hub. Once completed, turbine towers from the Port of Albany plant will be transported via barge down the Hudson River to SBMT. There, they will join other components for staging and assembly before deployment offshore. This coordinated port infrastructure strategy – with fabrication in Albany and staging in Brooklyn – is a key part of Empire Wind’s plan to maximize local content and streamline logistics. By investing in both port facilities, the project is helping to build an offshore wind supply chain in New York, spanning from component manufacturing to final installation.

=== Other key infrastructure details ===
==== Installation vessels ====
The installation of Empire Wind’s turbines will employ a specialized feeder-based strategy to comply with U.S. maritime regulations. Empire Wind has chartered a first-of-its-kind wind turbine installation vessel (WTIV) from Maersk Supply Service, designed to handle the 15 MW turbines. This newbuild vessel will work in tandem with Jones Act-compliant transport barges and tugs (provided by Kirby Offshore Wind) that shuttle components from the Brooklyn staging port to the offshore site. The WTIV will remain stationed at the wind farm, lifting and assembling the towers, nacelles, and blades, while the feeder barges continuously deliver components from SBMT. This “dock-ready feeder” setup improves efficiency and safety by reducing the number of offshore lifts and keeping the foreign-flag installation vessel productive without needing to port for each load. It represents an innovative approach to deploying large turbines under the Jones Act constraints, and Empire Wind 1 and 2 will be among the first U.S. projects to utilize this method. Additionally, heavy-lift vessels and pile-driving equipment will be used to install the monopile foundations and offshore substation platforms, staged out of New York/New Jersey port facilities.

==== Operations and maintenance vessels ====
Long-term maintenance of the wind farm will be supported by purpose-built vessels and infrastructure. Empire Wind will employ a dedicated Service Operations Vessel (SOV) to accommodate technicians and perform regular inspections on the offshore turbines. The SOV is planned to berth at the SBMT O&M base and will utilize the port’s facilities for refueling and resupply. Notably, the Empire Wind SOV is expected to be a plug-in hybrid vessel – the first of its kind deployed in the U.S. offshore wind sector – capable of recharging its batteries dockside at SBMT. This hybrid SOV will reduce emissions and noise during operations, aligning with the project’s sustainability goals. For daily crew transfers and smaller tasks, the project will also have a fleet of crew transfer vessels (CTVs) based in the region. These CTVs can ferry workers to turbines from port on an as-needed basis, particularly during favorable weather windows. The combination of a large SOV and smaller CTVs ensures flexibility in O&M activities, enabling round-the-clock presence offshore when needed and efficient deployment of personnel. Other supporting infrastructure includes a communications network linking the wind farm to shore and meteorological monitoring systems installed on the substations or dedicated platforms. Together, these infrastructure elements – from advanced installation vessels to the O&M fleet – are tailored to the Empire Wind project’s scale and location, helping to safely construct and operate one of the first utility-scale offshore wind farms serving New York.

==== Unique considerations ====
The Empire Wind project’s lease area sits adjacent to major shipping lanes entering New York Harbor, so the turbine layout and cable routes were coordinated to maintain safe navigation corridors. Extensive geotechnical surveys were conducted to account for seabed conditions (including areas of glacial sediment known as “glauconite”) and to inform foundation designs. Noise mitigation measures (such as bubble curtains) are expected to be used during monopile installation to protect marine mammals in the area, per regulatory requirements. The onshore construction in Brooklyn and Long Island is taking place in densely populated areas, which required careful planning for cable routes (using underground ducts beneath city streets and a horizontal directional drilling for the landfalls) to minimize community and environmental impacts. Finally, the infrastructure development is being coordinated across multiple jurisdictions – New York State, New York City, and Long Island – making Empire Wind a complex, multi-faceted project. Despite these challenges, the project’s infrastructure plan integrates the offshore generation with the onshore grid and port facilities in a way that supports New York’s clean energy goals while also establishing new industrial capabilities in the region.

=== Empire Wind 1 ===
- April 1, 2024 – Construction begins on onshore facilities, including transmission infrastructure.
- July 15, 2024 – Offshore construction starts with the installation of foundations.
- September 10, 2025 – Installation of wind turbine generators (WTGs) begins.
- June 30, 2026 – Expected completion of construction.
- December 31, 2026 – Project is anticipated to be commissioned and fully operational.

=== Empire Wind 2 ===
- January 2024 – Equinor and BP terminate their Offshore Wind Renewable Energy Certificate (OREC) purchase agreement with NYSERDA due to economic challenges.
- 2025–2026 – Project restructuring in progress to secure a new offtake agreement and timeline.

== Benefits and concerns ==
=== Economic benefits ===
Empire Wind is expected to generate substantial economic activity in New York. The project will create thousands of jobs through its construction and operation, including over 1,000 union construction jobs for the development of the South Brooklyn Marine Terminal (SBMT) and turbine assembly, plus dozens of long-term operations positions. The redevelopment of SBMT into a dedicated offshore wind port – one of the largest planned in the U.S. – is a major infrastructure investment tied to Empire Wind. This port will serve as a staging and maintenance base for the wind farm and has attracted significant funding for local workforce development (such as an Offshore Wind Learning Center and innovation hubs in Brooklyn) to train workers for the growing offshore wind industry. Empire Wind is also projected to contribute to public revenues and overall economic growth: an analysis of the first phase (Empire Wind 1) estimated roughly $25 million in state and local tax revenues from the construction phase alone, and combined with a sister project it could deliver over $6 billion in economic benefits statewide over its 25-year lifespan.

=== Environmental benefits ===
Empire Wind is a key part of New York’s strategy to meet its clean energy and climate goals. The first phase (810 MW) will feed renewable electricity directly into New York City, helping advance the state’s mandate of 9,000 MW of offshore wind by 2035 and displacing fossil-fuel generation. In combination with other planned wind farms, Empire Wind is expected to significantly reduce greenhouse gas emissions – on the order of millions of tons of CO₂ annually (one estimate for Empire Wind 1 together with Sunrise Wind exceeds 3 million metric tons per year, equivalent to the emissions of 740,000 cars). Beyond climate benefits, the wind turbine foundations may have a positive reef effect on marine life. The monopile structures act as artificial reefs once submerged; marine organisms and fish (e.g. mussels and black sea bass) are expected to colonize the hard surfaces, potentially increasing local fish abundance and biodiversity around the turbines. The project developers have also undertaken wildlife monitoring and research initiatives to ensure environmental stewardship. Empire Wind has partnered with conservation groups to monitor marine mammals – for example, deploying near real-time acoustic monitoring buoys in the New York Bight to detect whales in the area. The developers and state authorities have committed dedicated funding (approximately $16.5 million) for ongoing wildlife and fisheries monitoring programs, to study ecological impacts and inform adaptive management as the project proceeds. These efforts aim to align the wind farm’s operation with New York’s ecological conservation goals while delivering clean energy.

=== Concerns and opposition ===
Despite its anticipated benefits, the Empire Wind project has faced concerns from some environmental groups, local communities, and industry stakeholders. Conservation organizations have cautioned that large-scale offshore wind development could pose risks to marine life if not carefully managed. In the case of Empire Wind, its lease area lies in a busy section of the New York Bight, which advocacy groups note is used by protected species (including whales, fish, and birds) and by commercial fisheries. Critics worry that turbine construction noise, electromagnetic emissions from cables, and the physical presence of dozens of turbines could disrupt whale migration routes or fish habitats. Commercial fishing industry representatives have also raised objections, arguing that the wind farm’s location in historically productive fishing grounds may displace fishermen and impact catches. They have voiced concerns about navigational safety and access, since clustering turbines in fishing areas and near shipping lanes could complicate vessel transit and increase collision risks in bad weather or fog. In addition to offshore environmental issues, there are community-level concerns onshore. Some Long Island and New York City residents have opposed aspects of the project’s infrastructure, citing potential visual impacts and noise. Although the turbines will be 15–30 miles offshore (minimizing their visibility from land), coastal communities have expressed unease about seeing turbine blades on the horizon under certain conditions. During the project's onshore construction phase, locals in the vicinity of the landfall sites and substations are concerned about noise, vibration, traffic, and other temporary disturbances. For example, construction activities like horizontal drilling for burying transmission cables could generate noise and disrupt nearby public areas or parks, which has been noted as a stakeholder concern in project reviews. Similarly, officials have acknowledged that without proper safeguards, heavy construction could worsen air quality or noise levels in neighborhoods already burdened by industry. These various concerns have fueled calls for stringent oversight and mitigation to ensure the wind farm is developed responsibly.

=== Mitigation measures ===
Multiple mitigation measures are planned to address the above concerns and reduce the project’s environmental and social impacts. To support the fishing industry, Empire Wind’s developers have established a Fisheries Compensation Plan to offset any negative effects on commercial fishermen. This plan includes a claims process through which fishermen can be reimbursed for losses attributable to the project – for instance, the replacement value of any gear damaged by wind farm activities (up to 100% of the gear’s cost) and partial compensation for lost income if fishing areas are temporarily inaccessible due to construction or maintenance work. The project’s outreach team also employs fisheries liaisons and consults regularly with fishing communities from Massachusetts to New Jersey, seeking input on turbine layout and safety measures to facilitate continued fishing access around the lease area. Empire Wind is subject to strict environmental protection requirements during construction and operation, particularly for marine mammals. Comprehensive monitoring and response protocols will be in place: trained Protected Species Observers (PSOs) will be stationed on project vessels to watch for whales and other marine mammals, and real-time acoustic monitoring buoys are deployed to detect whale vocalizations near the site. If a whale or other sensitive species is detected within defined exclusion zones around the work area, construction activity (such as pile driving) is halted and vessels must reduce speed to avoid vessel strikes. Regulators have mandated seasonal restrictions as well – for example, no pile driving will be conducted during the winter/early-spring months when endangered North Atlantic right whales are most likely to be present in the region. The project is also required to implement noise mitigation techniques to minimize underwater sound impacts on wildlife. One key measure is the use of a "double bubble curtain" during pile driving: before driving a monopile, a ring of perforated hoses on the seafloor releases two layers of air bubbles around the pile, which absorb and deflect much of the acoustic energy from the hammer blows. In addition, pile driving for Empire Wind turbines will begin with a “soft start” – gradually ramping up hammer force – to give any marine animals time to move away before full-energy driving commences. These mitigation practices, along with mandatory shutdown zones and continuous agency oversight, are designed to reduce harm to wildlife and other ocean users. By combining compensation programs, technological safeguards, and operational protocols, the developers and regulators aim to address the concerns raised and ensure that Empire Wind is built and operated in an environmentally responsible manner.

== Current and future outlook ==
=== Cancelations ===
As of 2025, the Empire Wind project remains a significant component of New York’s renewable energy strategy. Empire Wind 1 is progressing as scheduled, with onshore and offshore construction milestones being met. The project is expected to generate approximately 816 megawatts (MW) of electricity, supplying power to over 388,000 homes upon completion.

Empire Wind 2, initially planned to add around 1.2 gigawatts (GW) of capacity, faced economic setbacks, leading to the cancellation of its power purchase agreement. The cancellation was due to rising inflation, supply chain issues, and changing economic conditions that made the project financially unviable under the original terms. Equinor and BP mutually agreed with the New York State Energy Research and Development Authority (NYSERDA) to end the contract, highlighting concerns over profitability and regulatory uncertainty.

=== Biden administration ===
Government policies and regulatory challenges have also impacted the project's future. The offshore wind industry has faced difficulties securing long-term financial stability due to evolving state and federal regulations. The Biden administration has pushed for offshore wind expansion, but industry stakeholders have raised concerns about inconsistent subsidies and permitting delays.

=== Trump administration ===
Equinor suspended construction of Empire Wind after U.S. Interior Secretary Doug Burgum issued a stop-work order on April 16, 2025, following meetings with Commerce Secretary Howard Lutnick. The project needed a permit from the National Marine Fisheries Service, which is part of the Commerce Department. On May 19 the Trump administration agreed to lift the stop order on the project and will allow it to continue moving forward after reaching a separate compromise on natural gas pipeline construction. This also followed an intense lobbying effort by Equinor.

On December 22, 2025, work on Empire Wind stopped again after Burgum paused its lease, along with those of four other offshore wind farm projects, citing unspecified national security concerns.

== See also ==
- Hudson Canyon
- Wind power in the United States
- List of offshore wind farms in the United States
- List of offshore wind farms
- Wind power in New York
- Equinor operations by country
