= Venture management =

Venture management is a business management discipline that focuses on being both innovative and challenging in the realm of introducing what could be a completely new product or entering a promising newly emerging market.

The discipline is focused on the skills, practices and technology required to manage the rapid growth of new business in highly dynamic environments. These environments are often characterized by rapid technology change.

Reacting on more volatile and basically unknown or immature markets, Venture management is by design opportunity driven and reactive on generated market data and consumer behaviour. In contrast to business plan-driven traditional management concepts, venture marketing is iterative and experimental, operating on short recurring cycles of implementation and adaptation. Venture management techniques apply equally well to venture capital-funded firms, self-financed firms, and business entities that are managed with a large degree of independence within a large established firm.
