= Repowering =

Process of replacing older power stations with newer ones

Repowering is the process of replacing older power stations with newer ones that either have a greater nameplate capacity or more efficiency which results in a net increase of power generated. Repowering can happen in several different ways. It can be as small as switching out and replacing a boiler, to as large as replacing the entire system to create a more powerful system entirely. There are many upsides to repowering.

The simple act of refurbishing the old with the new is in itself beneficial alongside the cost reduction for keeping the plant running. With less costs and a higher energy output, the process is excessively beneficial.

== Examples ==
=== Wind power ===
Comparison of three different generations of wind turbines from the same manufacturer. From left to right: Enercon E-141 from the late 2010s, Enercon E-82 from the 2000s and E-40 from the 1990s. The larger the rotor, the slower and smoother it turns.

Repowering a wind farm means replacing older, generally smaller, wind turbines with newer, generally larger, and more efficient designs. New innovations in wind power technology have dramatically increased the power output of new turbines compared with older designs. By repowering old wind turbines with new upgrades, the increased size and efficiency of the new turbines will increase the amount of energy that can be generated from a given wind farm. In the United States in 2017, 2131 MW of wind plant repowering was completed.

According to a study in California the potential benefits of repowering wind plants by replacing old turbines are:

- Avian mortality may be reduced due to the installation of a smaller number of larger wind turbines.
- Reduced aesthetic concerns to the extent that modern wind projects are deemed more visually appealing, even if they are taller.
- “Increased renewable energy production due to the higher average capacity factors typical of new wind facilities.”
- Use of existing infrastructure (for example, roads, substations), resulting in lower installation costs relative to new “greenfield” wind power projects.
- “Use of newer wind turbine technology that can better support the electrical grid with better power quality.”
- Increased local and state tax base, plus positive construction employment opportunities.

Countries like Germany and Denmark that have a large number of wind turbines installed relative to their total land size have resorted to repowering older turbines in order to increase wind power capacity and generation. The power as well as use of wind farms has grown since the 1990s.

California has many aging wind turbines that would be effective to repower, but there seems to be a lack of economic incentive to repower many sites. Many smaller turbines in California were built in the 1980s with a nameplate capacity of 50-100 kW, which is 10-40x smaller than the nameplate capacity of an average modern wind turbine. Although many barriers continue to hinder rapid wind‐project repowering, a primary barrier is simply that many existing, aging wind facilities are more profitable, in the near term, in continued operations than they might be if they pursue repowering with new wind turbines. By 2007, California had repowered 365 MW of wind plants, which is only 20% of the potential 1,640 MW wind capacity that could be upgraded.

In India, an increasing share of wind turbines are reaching design lifetime, and a comparatively high share of smaller, lower energy-yielding turbines in the operational fleet favours a strategy of early retirement and repowering. Indeed, a recently revised repowering policy for India incentivises upgrading turbines up to 2 MW rated output, corresponding to 25.4 GW or approximately 60% of total wind capacity. Although few repowering projects have been completed to date, considerable potential exists, with a recent study showing how full repowering of the existing fleet of wind turbines could boost capacity factors by 82% nationwide.

=== Coal-fired Power Plant to Gas ===
With new environmental regulation in the United States, coal-fired power plants are becoming obsolete. As many as three-fourths of coal-fired power plants are being shut down. Short-term options include retiring the plant or quick conversion to direct firing of the boiler with natural gas. Repowering these old coal burning power plants into gas burning boilers. It's estimated that as much as 30 gigawatts (GW) of existing U.S. power generation capacity could be lost through plant closings due to new U.S. Environmental Protection Agency (EPA) regulations. There could be a saving of 20 percent of the capital cost instead of building brand new power plants founded by EPRI studied.

The configuration of these plants involves replacing the old coal boiler with gas-fired turbine (GT). The gas-fired outputs exhaust heat to a heat recovery steam generator (HRSG). From the output of the heat recovery steam generator it is run into a steam turbine which increases electricity production and the overall efficiency of the plant. The gas-fired turbine (GT) and the heat recovery steam generator (HRSG) technology has been in utilize in many repowering projects over the past 20 years in the United States alone. With increasing environmental regulations of the United States Government and the lower fuel prices made the usage of GT/HRSG an option in utilizing to renew many old coal heating power plants. This modern gas turbines operate with higher efficiencies and adding a heat recovery steam generator (HRSG) raises overall plant efficiency to 40 percent to 50 percent (HHV) above the range of most coal-fired plants, reducing fuel consumption and lowering plant emissions. Siemens Corporation are also using this technology by combining the gas turbine (GT) in conjunction with the heat recovery steam generator (HRSG) with the steam turbine (ST) and the combined cycle power plants to produce the most efficient power generation facilities. Existing direct-fired plants can utilize this advanced cycle concept by adding a GT and a HRSG. This so-called repowering scheme makes the existing power generation facility equally efficient as modern combined cycle power plant.

Siemens Corporation developed two ways in powering these old coal plants. The first one is called a Full Powering and the second is called Parallel Powering. Full Powering is only used with old plants because the boilers has reached the life of its usage. Full powering replaces the original boiler and gas-turbine (GT) and heat recovery steam generator are added (HRSG). While compared to the full repowering concept, this repowering scheme achieves slightly lower efficiency. Due to the two independent steam sources for the steam turbine, this concept provides a higher fuel flexibility and also greater flexibility in respect to load variations. An example of a repowering project is of Fluor updating the Seward plant. The plant was a 521-MW coal-fired power plant. The plant burns waste coal. The project was to take three existing pulverized coal-fired boilers out and install two new Clean Coal Technology CFB boilers with major changes such as installing two Alstom CFB boilers along with an Alstom steam turbine generator. This plant is now the largest waste coal generator in the world with a capacity of 521-MW of capacity. It runs on 11,000 tons of waste coal per day.

== See also ==
- List of energy storage projects
