= Northport Power Station =

Fuel oil and natural gas power plant in Northport, New York

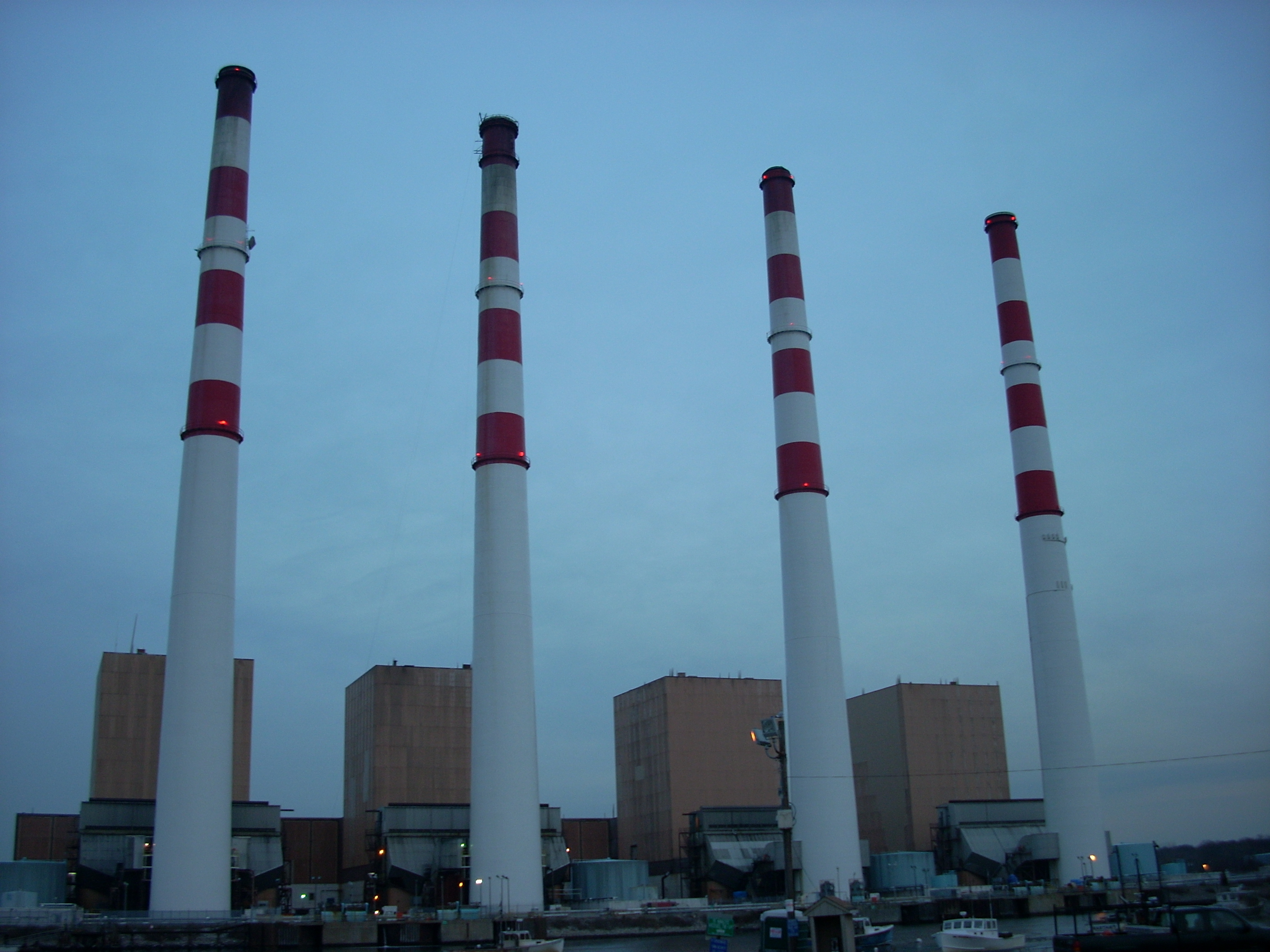
- Northport Power Station in 2007
- Country: United States
- Location: Northport, New York
- Coordinates: 40°55′22″N 73°20′34″W
- Status: Operational
- Construction began: 1967
- Operator: National Grid USA

Power generation
- Nameplate capacity: 1,500 MW

External links
- Commons: Related media on Commons

The Northport Power Station – known locally as “The Stacks” – is the largest power generation facility on Long Island. It is a natural gas and conventional oil electric power generating station located on the North Shore of Long Island in Fort Salonga, New York. The facility was built by the Long Island Lighting Company (LILCO) in stages between 1967 and 1977 and since August 2007 it has been owned and operated by National Grid USA. The plant's electric output is distributed by Long Island Power Authority (LIPA).

In 2010, National Grid filed a lawsuit against the Town of Huntington to challenge the station's property tax levy, which at $80 million made it the most taxed building in the United States. In September 2020, a settlement for a tax reduction on the facility was reached.

== Description ==
Northport Power Station is the largest power generation facility on Long Island. As of 2021, Northport Power Station consists of four steam turbine units with a nameplate capacity of 387.0 MW each, as well as one gas turbine unit with a nameplate capacity of 16.0 MW, for a total of 1564 MW. In 2020, the steam turbine units together generated 2950.6 GWh of energy, which was about 29% of all locally generated power on Long Island that year, while the gas turbine unit was unused. All units are primarily fueled by natural gas, although the steam units have the capability to burn fuel oil as well.

The four enormous smoke stacks are a defining landmark of Northport and can be seen from up to 36 miles away atop East Rock in New Haven, Connecticut, across the Long Island Sound. At 620 ft (190 m), they are the tallest freestanding structures on Long Island.

The facility is the Long Island connection point for the Northport–Norwalk Harbor Cable. The Iroquois Pipeline also passes through the site.

== Original plant ==
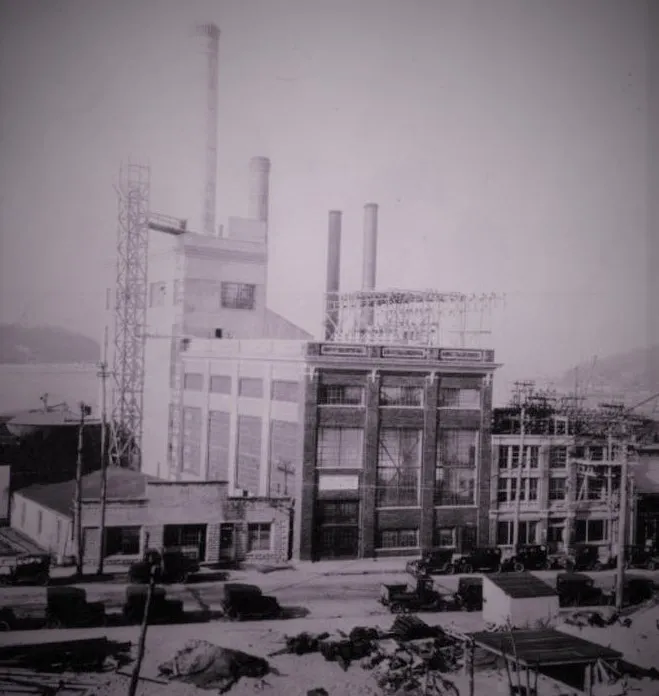
The original power plant at the foot of Main Street around 1925

The Northport Electric Light Company was established in 1893, and its original plant began operating in 1895 at the waterfront near the foot of Main Street. In 1911, the power plant and three others across Long Island were consolidated into the new Long Island Lighting Company (LILCO). A new 500 kW turbine was installed at the power station later in 1911, which was upgraded to 1000 kW in 1928. The original plant was demolished in 1968 as the new plant began operations.

== Current plant ==
=== Construction and early history ===
Planning for the current station began in 1957. The new site had previously been used for sand mining, and a channel had already been dredged alongside it for sand barges. The first unit of the new plant began operating in 1968.

LILCO made many concessions to neighboring communities to reduce its visual impact. A lawsuit from the Town of Huntington that went to the New York Court of Appeals forced LILCO to bury nine miles of power lines leading inland instead of using transmission towers, at what LILCO contended was an excessive cost that would ultimately be passed on to customers. The plant was designed as an enclosed, soundproofed building, which was unusual for the time, and had the best available smoke filtering systems. The barge dock was father out in Long Island Sound than initially planned, at 10,000 feet offshore, to accommodate larger oil barges that would visit three times per month instead of daily; and the oil pipeline leading from the dock was buried underwater. The town also insisted that the height of the smokestacks be increased from the originally planned 450 feet to over 600 feet.

At the same time, the longest underwater electric transmission line in the United States was built under Long Island Sound to Norwalk, Connecticut. The Northport–Norwalk Harbor Cable began operation in 1969. The cable was completely replaced with a modern cable system in 2008.

By the time Unit 4 was completed in 1977, it was among the last conventional oil fired-units built in the United States.

In 1998, as part of a state-brokered deal, LILCO's power generation facilities, including Northport Power Station, were absorbed into KeySpan Energy, with the public Long Island Power Authority (LIPA) taking over transmission and delivery functions. KeySpan was acquired by National Grid in 2007.

=== Age and pollution ===
In 2005, a coalition of New York environmental groups issued a report which named the Northport Power Station as the number one polluting plant on Long Island and the second most polluting plant in the Northeast. The plant outputs 5.2 million metric tons of carbon dioxide every year. The reason for these concerns primarily lay with the age of the power plant, being constructed in the 1960s and 1970s. The plant is exempt from Clean Air Act emissions standards because it was grandfathered in when the law was passed.

The Northport Power Station additionally requires significant water for its operations, and was the largest single user of water supplied by the Suffolk County Water Authority in 2025.

As a result of pollution and health concerns, United States Senator Charles E. Schumer and Suffolk County Legislator Jon Cooper have been calling for modernizing the inefficient Northport Power Station.

The Northport Power Station has undergone a gradual decline in its annual energy production, from 55.8 percent of plant capacity in 2005 to 15.2 percent last year (2019). That decline is expected to continue to 2.9 percent of plant capacity by 2035.

=== Tax settlement ===
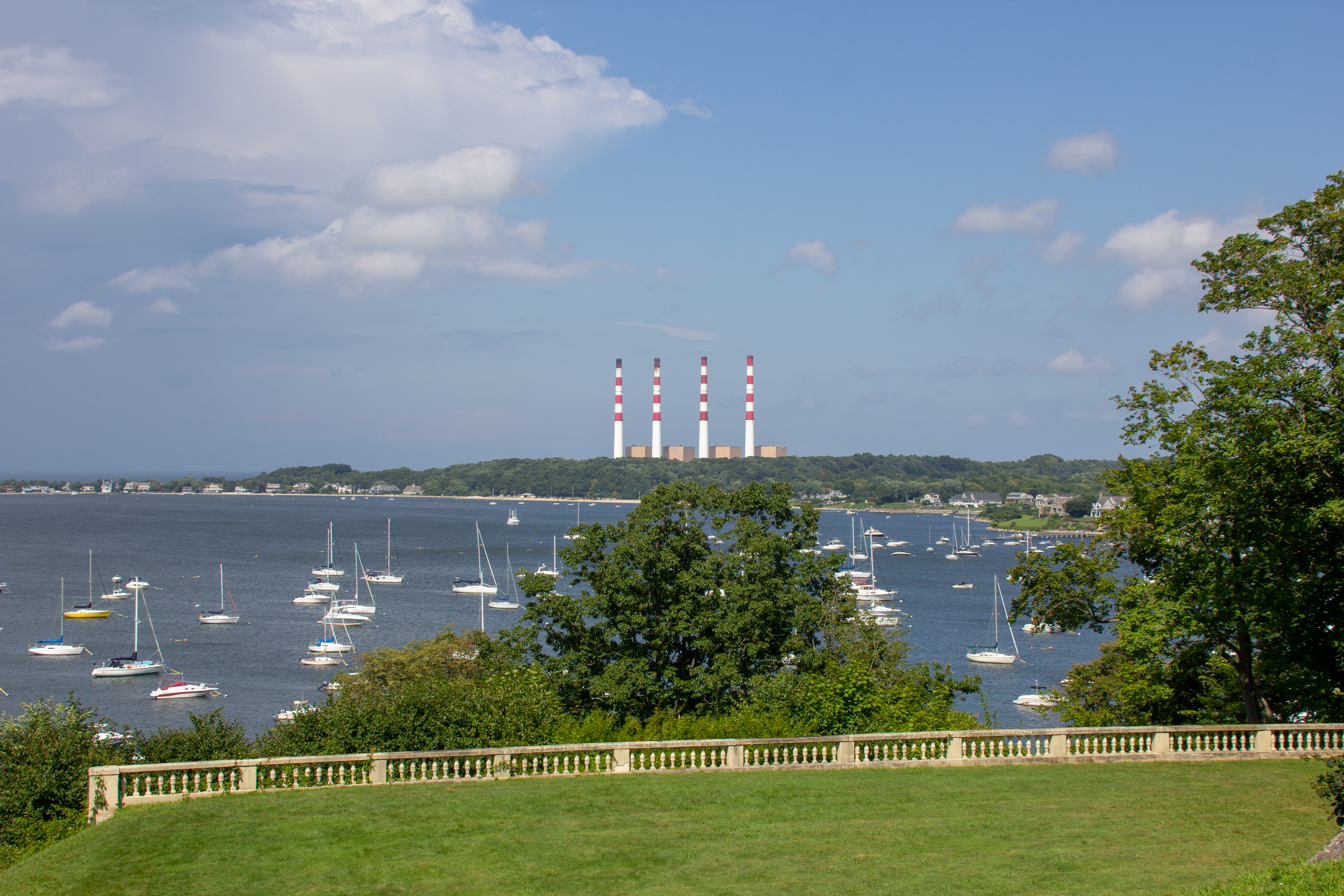
Northport Power Station viewed from the Vanderbilt Museum across Northport Bay in 2018

In 2010, LIPA teamed with National Grid to file a lawsuit against the Town of Huntington alleging that the building was too overvalued and that National Grid was paying too much taxes on the building. The judges ruled that LIPA did not have the right to be a plaintiff in the case because the building was owned by National Grid, affirmative to a later 2015 New York Supreme Court appeal, which had the same outcome. LIPA continued the legal battle however, and the Town of Huntington attorney Nicholas Ciappetta agreed resolve the dispute through mediation to begin a trial. The lawsuit has sparked protests among residents of Huntington, with concerns of property taxes and school taxes rising.

LILCO had initialed challenges against several plants including Northport in the early 1990s, but these were dropped in 2004 after they had been inherited by LIPA. LIPA reinstated these challenges in 2010. The Town of Huntington, Port Jefferson School District, and Northport-East Northport School District sued LIPA on the basis that in a claimed 1997 agreement with then-Governor George Pataki and local school districts, LIPA had agreed not to seek to lower the assessed tax value. In 2018, the Suffolk County Supreme Court ruled that the agreement had been binding on LILCO but not on LIPA.

In September 2020, a settlement was reached, with the Town Council voting 4–1 for reduced taxes and the Northport School District Board of Education accepting it. The will lower LIPA's property taxes on the Power Station from $86 million to $46 million over the course of seven years. In turn, LIPA will have to pay $14.5 million to the school district each year and $3 million to the town.

== See also ==
- List of power stations in New York
- New York energy law
