= Long Island Lighting Company =

Electric and gas utility in New York (1911–1998)

- LILCO Logo of the 1960s and 1990s
- Industry: Electric utility
- Founded: Long Island, New York (1911) by Ellis Laurimore Phillips & George W. Olmsted
- Founder: Ellis Laurimore Phillips
- Defunct: 1998
- Fate: Electrical transmission network acquired by LIPA, electrical distribution system and natural gas operations merged with Brooklyn Union Gas to form KeySpan
- Successor: Long Island Power Authority, KeySpan
- Headquarters: Hicksville, New York, United States
- Key people: W. J. Catacosinos, Chairman & CEO, J. T. Flynn, President & COO, A. Nozzolillo Sr. VP-Finance & CFO, T. A. Babcock, Treasurer, K. A. Marion, Corporate Secretary
- Products: Electrical & natural gas utility in Nassau, Suffolk and Queens Counties, on Long Island, New York

The Long Island Lighting Company, or LILCO ("lil-co"), was an electrical power company and natural gas utility for Long Island, New York, serving 2.7 million people in Nassau, Suffolk and Queens counties, from 1911 until 1998.

== History ==
=== Formation ===
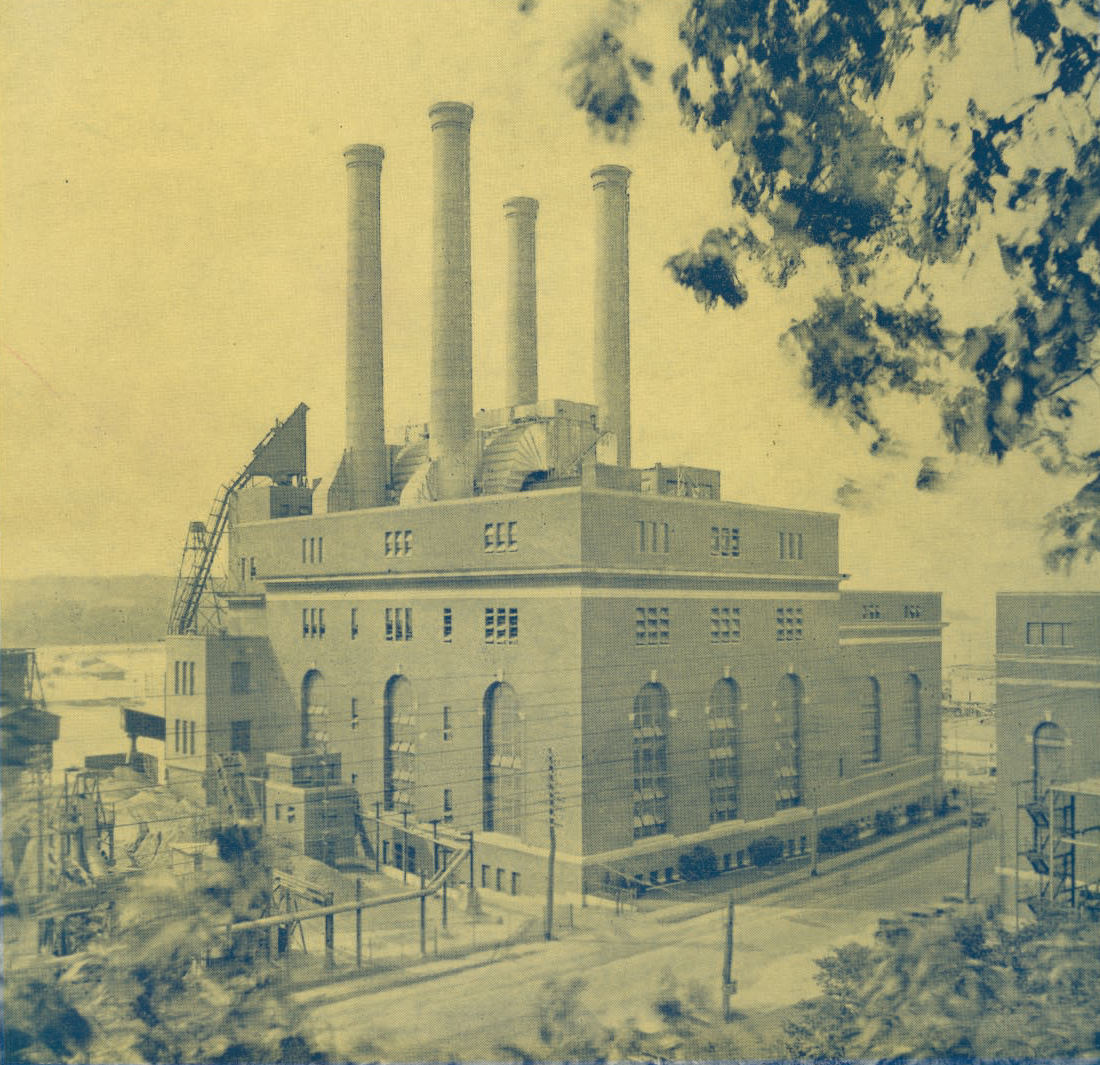
Glenwood Generating Station in 1936

LILCO was founded by Ellis Laurimore Phillips, an engineer, and a group of New York City investors, including George W. Olmsted. Their business plan was to acquire thr multiple small power utilities that served individual villages on Long Island and interconnect them into an island-wide grid. In 1911, they purchased four small electric companies in Amityville, Islip, Northport and Sayville.

The Glenwood Generating Station was constructed from 1928 to 1931. The extra generating capacity was needed due to a sixfold increase in Long Island's electricity demand from 1910 to 1925. The expansion also reflected LILCO's then-novel philosophy of using few centralized power plants interconnected by transmission lines, rather than many small plants distributed through the region. In 1936, it was described as "the key electric generating plant of the Long Island system," and its control room managed LILCO's entire system.

=== Mid-century expansion ===
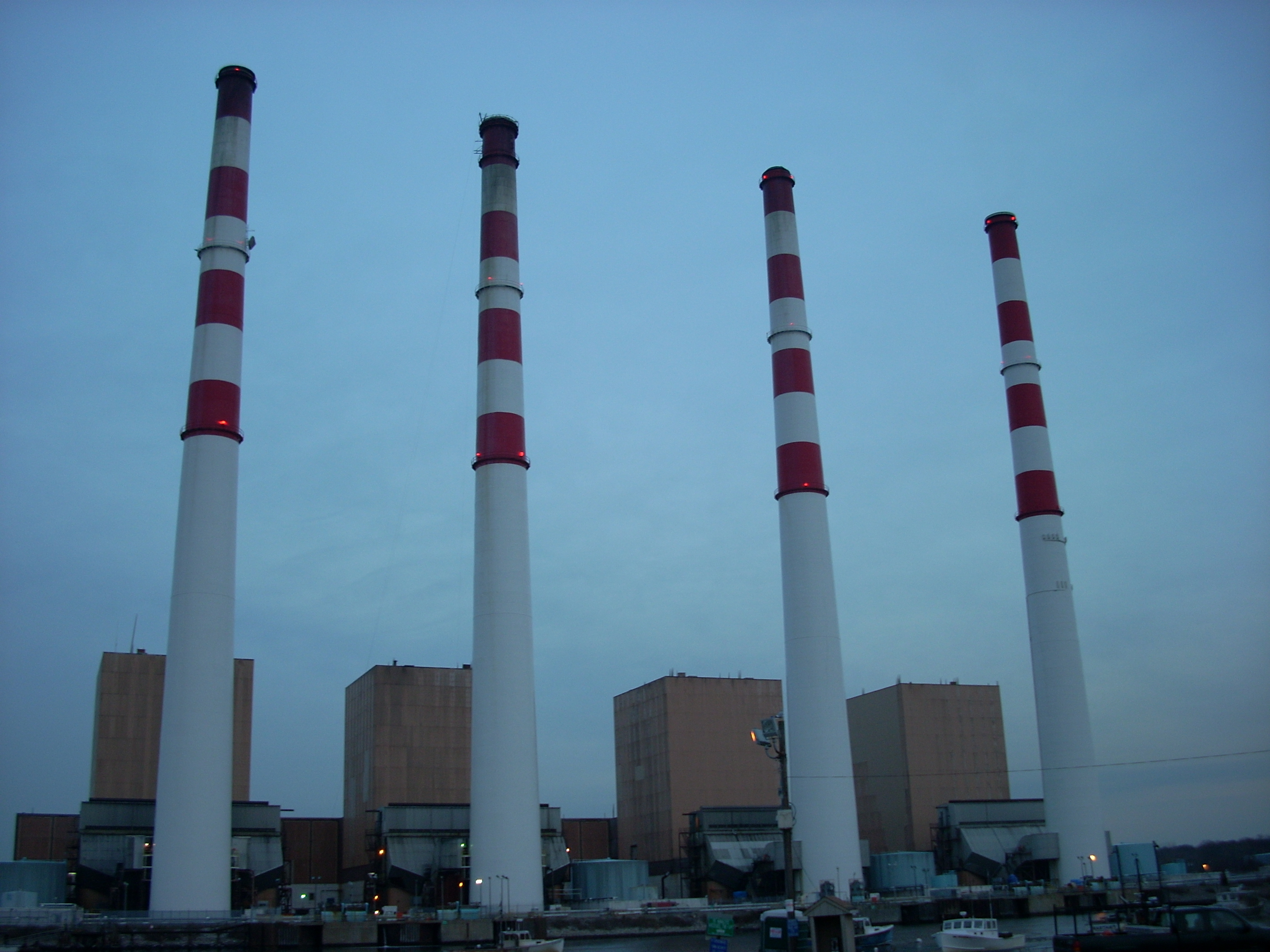
Northport Power Station in 2007

LILCO greatly increased its generating facilities to meet increasing power demands created by Long Island's postwar population growth. In the 1950s, two new units were constructed at the Glenwood Generating Station, two at the new E. F. Barrett Power Station, and one at the new Far Rockaway Power Station. At the time, The New York Times called the Glenwood Generating Station "one of the most modern power plants in the country," with mechanical and electrostatic precipitators for dust and ash collection and valve silencers and noise barriers. It was the first turbine generator mounted on an open deck in the Northeastern United States. Four units were also constructed at the Port Jefferson Power Station between 1948 and 1960.

The four units of the Northport Power Station, constructed between 1967 and 1977, became Long Island's largest power plant. In addition to the large steam turbine plants, LILCO built a large number of smaller gas turbine generators in the early 1970s, most of them at the E. F. Barrett Power Station and a new facility in Holtsville.

=== Difficulties ===
LILCO was long notorious for its high rates. Indeed, according to a 1999 article in The New York Times, LILCO's rates were considered part of an "unholy trinity of life on Long Island," along with the Long Island Rail Road's service woes and traffic snarls on the Long Island Expressway.

In 1983, the Suffolk County legislature resolved that the county could not be safely evacuated in an emergency at the LILCO-built Shoreham Nuclear Power Plant. To show they were prepared for the event of a nuclear mishap at Shoreham, LILCO created a volunteer organization, staffed by Shoreham engineers and various staff from LILCO itself, named LERO (Local Emergency Response Organization) to assist the public.

Hurricane Gloria hit Long Island on September 27, 1985, but power was not fully restored until October 8. The utility's poor response to the storm further eroded public confidence in LILCO's ability to handle an emergency and placed increased pressure to shutter the Shoreham Nuclear Power Plant.

Ultimately, in a political decision born from LILCO's inability to present a viable evacuation plan for Suffolk County, Shoreham was closed down in 1992 after never having operated at more than minimum power for testing purposes.

=== Demise and aftermath ===
On March 5, 1998, final Federal approval was received for the Long Island Power Authority (LIPA), a public authority of the state, to take over LILCO's electrical transmission network. The deal was completed later that year. LIPA acquired LILCO's transmission assets, while the rest of LILCO, including its electrical generation and natural gas businesses, merged with Brooklyn Union Gas to form KeySpan. However, KeySpan continued to run LILCO's old transmission network under contract with LIPA.

KeySpan was taken over by National Grid USA in 2007. In 2014, National Grid handed control of Long Island's electrical transmission system to New Jersey utility Public Service Enterprise Group.

== Major power plants ==
All locations are in New York.

Name	Location	Units completed	Nominal capacity	Current status
Glenwood Generating Station	Glenwood Landing	1930–1954		Decommissioned in 2012 and demolished
Far Rockaway Power Station	Far Rockaway, Queens	1953		Decommissioned in 2012 and demolished
E. F. Barrett Power Station	Barnum Island	1956–1963	385 MW	In use
Port Jefferson Power Station	Port Jefferson	1948–1960	383 MW	In use; Units 1 and 2 decommissioned in 1994
Northport Power Station	Fort Salonga	1967–1977	1,522 MW	In use
Shoreham Nuclear Power Plant	East Shoreham	1984	820 MW	Never operated

In addition to the major plants, LILCO constructed smaller gas turbine plants at the above facilities and in East Hampton North, Holtsville, Southampton, Southold, and West Babylon.
