= Cross Sound Cable =

Cross-Sound Cable
- Map of Cross-Sound Cable

Location
- Country: United States
- State: Connecticut; New York
- From: New Haven, Connecticut
- To: Shoreham, New York

Ownership information
- Operator: Cross Sound Cable Company, LLC

Technical information
- Total length: 25 mi (40 km)
- Website: www.crosssoundcable.com

The Cross-Sound Cable is a 25-mile (40 km) long bipolar high-voltage direct current (HVDC) submarine power cable between New Haven, Connecticut and Shoreham, on Long Island, in New York, United States.

== Description ==
The Cross-Sound Cable can transmit a maximum power of 330 MW at a voltage of +/- 150 kV DC. The maximum current for Cross-Sound Cable is 1175 amperes. The Cross-Sound Cable is not simply a pair of underwater HVDC cables; rather, it is a bundle of cables that includes the HVDC transmission lines and fiber-optic cables for phone and Internet data transfer.

Construction of the Cross-Sound Cable was started in 2002 from the former site of the Shoreham Nuclear Power Plant. The cable was first laid on the floor of Long Island Sound; then a machine known as a jet plow tool used high-pressure water to fluidize the sea bed directly under the cable. The cable then fell into the liquidized trench.

Concern over possible environmental impact of the buried underwater cables caused significant delay in operation. Commercial operation of the cable was delayed until after the August 14, 2003 blackout of much of the eastern North American power system. Immediately after the blackout, emergency permission was secured to operate the cable. The cable has since been operating and, generally, sells electricity from the New England power grid to the New York power grid.

The builders and first operators of the project – TransÉnergie HQ (a subsidiary of Hydro-Québec) and the United Illuminating Company – sold their interests in the cable to Babcock & Brown for approximately US $213 million in February 2006.

The converters of Cross-Sound Cable are examples of HVDC light technology. Power can flow in either direction between New Haven and Shoreham terminals.

== See also ==
- Y-49 Cable – A transmission cable between Westchester County and Long Island, via the Long Island Sound.
