= Stewart Avenue–Uniondale Hub Substation =

- Country: United States
- Location: Stewart Avenue, Uniondale, New York; Hamlet of East Garden City
- Coordinates: 40.730706°N 73.611309°W
- Status: Operational
- Owner: New York Power Authority
- Operator: New York Power Authority

The Stewart Avenue–Uniondale Hub Substation (also known as the Stewart Avenue Substation and colloquially as both the Uniondale Hub and by its former name, East Garden City Substation) is a major electric transmission substation located on Stewart Avenue within the East Garden City section of Uniondale, in Nassau County, New York, United States.

The substation is operated by the New York Power Authority (NYPA), and it serves as both a critical part of Long Island's high-voltage transmission network – and as a connection point between the Long Island and mainland sections of New York's statewide power grid.

== Overview ==
Located in the heart of Nassau County, the Uniondale Hub serves as a critical hub for Long Island's transmission network, linking several of the Long Island Power Authority's West–East and North–South 138 kV lines. It additionally functions an important connection point for high-voltage transmission into Long Island, including the Y-49 Cable – a 345-kV underground–submarine transmission cable between it and the Sprain Brook Substation in Yonkers, Westchester County, by way of the Long Island Sound.

As of 2026, the substation is being upgraded and expanded as part of New York's Propel NY energy project and NYPA's Uniondale Hub Substation Upgrade Project – major energy infrastructure projects being undertaken to increase electrical capacity on Long Island, increase the share of renewable energy in Long Island's electricity mix, and make the island's grid more resilient and interconnected with the rest of the New York grid on the mainland.

== History ==
Originally known as the East Garden City Substation, the Uniondale Hub was first constructed in the early 20th century, as part of the expansions of the high-voltage electric transmission infrastructure on Long Island to better serve the region's growing needs and population.

In the 1950s, additional transmission lines were constructed by the Long Island Lighting Company (LILCO) between the substation and the Glenwood Generating Station along Hempstead Harbor in Glenwood Landing, largely by way of the former Long Island Motor Parkway's right-of-way and that of the Long Island Rail Road's Oyster Bay Branch, and the former Roslyn Power Station in Roslyn Heights.

In the late 20th century, the Y-49 Cable – a 345-kV transmission line between the Sprain Brook Substation in Yonkers, Westchester County, and the Uniondale Hub – was constructed; the substation would accordingly become a major link between the Long Island transmission system and that of the rest of New York state as part of the project. The Y-49 Cable began operating in May 1991, with a capacity of 675 megawatts.

In 2019, permission was given for PSEG Long Island – which operates Long Island's transmission network on behalf of the Long Island Power Authority – to commence work on the Western Nassau Transmission Project. As part of this project, a new, 138-kV underground transmission cable would be constructed between the Uniondale Hub Substation and the Lynbrook Substation to its southwest.

=== 21st century expansions ===
In the early 2020s, the State of New York announced the launch of the Propel NY energy project, which would further link Long Island with the rest of New York's grid (including connections to Upstate New York), increase its electrical capacity and resiliency, and enable increased electricity – including imported hydropower from Hydro-Québec – on Long Island in order to reduce the region's energy constraints and costs as the region's electricity demands continue growing. The New York Independent System Operator (NYISO) – the body responsible for overseeing and controlling New York state's energy market – identified that, in order to optimally complete the project, the Uniondale Hub would need to be expanded; the substation would serve as one of the major hubs for the expanded network. Shortly thereafter, NYPA – as the owner and operator of the existing Uniondale Hub facility – announced that it would move forward with executing such an expansion project at the substation, known as the Uniondale Hub Substation Upgrade Project.

As part of the Uniondale Hub Substation Upgrade Project, a new, 345-kV gas-insulated substation (GIS) will be constructed adjacent to the existing facilities. New electrical infrastructure will be built on approximately 2.5 acres (1.0 ha) of existing utility-owned property; the new and existing facilities will be linked with one another using underground connections. Approvals were given with conditions for the project to proceed by the New York State Public Service Commission in 2025, and it was shortly thereafter announced that construction was slated to commence on the substation expansion project in mid-2026.

=== 2024 renaming ===
In September 2024, the Long Island Power Authority announced that the East Garden City Substation would be renamed the Stewart Avenue–Uniondale Hub Substation. This change was pushed for by the Greater Uniondale Area Action Coalition, which expressed dissatisfaction over how "East Garden City" remained part of the substation's name, in light of long-standing concerns of its over Uniondale's historic identification and those of the surrounding communities, with officials and activists asserting that the name was "erroneously created" to "divide" the community and allow business owners and real estate developers to avoid using the Uniondale name; similar efforts in the longstanding place-name debate led to the East Garden City CDP – so named for the eponymous hamlet, which was in turn so named due to large portions of it being located within the Garden City Post Office's ZIP Code and service area as opposed to the Uniondale Post Office – being absorbed between the 2010 and 2020 censuses by the Uniondale CDP.

== See also ==
- Richard M. Flynn Power Plant
- Y-49 Cable
