= Glenwood Power Station =

Glenwood Power Station may refer to:

- Glenwood Generating Station, a power station in Glenwood Landing, New York
- Yonkers Power Station, an abandoned electrical plant in Glenwood, Yonkers, New York
