= Michael Montesano =

American politician

Nassau County District Judge
- Incumbent
- Assumed office July 18, 2022

Member of the New York State Assembly from the 15th district
- In office February 9, 2010 – July 17, 2022
- Preceded by: Rob Walker
- Succeeded by: Jake Blumencranz

Personal details
- Born: October 16, 1954 (age 71) Brooklyn, New York
- Party: Republican
- Education: St. John's University; CUNY Law School
- Website: Facebook

Michael A. Montesano (born October 16, 1954) was member of the New York State Assembly representing the 15th district, which includes portions of the towns of Hempstead, North Hempstead and Oyster Bay in Nassau County on Long Island. A Republican, he was initially elected in a 2010 special election. Since 2022 he has served as a district judge of Nassau County.

== Early life ==
Montesano was born in Brooklyn, New York and grew up in the Gravesend neighborhood. He attended Saints Simon & Jude Elementary School before graduating from William E. Grady High School in 1973. He later worked for the Staten Island Rapid Transit Operating Authority, before becoming a dispatcher and with the New York City Emergency Medical Service in 1974, where he was eventually promoted to a supervising EMT. In 1979, Montesano moved to Glen Head, New York, and became a police officer in the New York City Police Department in 1981, later being promoted to detective.

In 1983, Montesano received an A.A.S. degree in Police Science from Nassau County Community College and later a B.S. degree in Criminal Justice from St. John's University. In 1989 he earned his Juris Doctor from the City University of New York School of Law at Queens College and was admitted to the New York State Bar Association.

Montesano started a private practice law firm in 1990. He has served as Acting Village Justice and a Village Prosecutor for Roslyn Harbor. He has also been President of the North Shore School District Board of Education, and adjunct professor at the New York Institute of Technology.

== Political career ==
=== State Assembly ===
After losing a close election for the Nassau County Legislature in 2009, in February 2010 he won a special election to replace Assembly Rob Walker, who vacated the seat after being named Deputy County Executive of Nassau County. Since then, he has won reelection five times. Montesano faced his closest election ever in 2018, when he defeated Democrat Allen Foley 53% to 47%.

=== District Judge ===
Montesano refused to seek re-election in 2022, instead seeking election as a District Judge for Nassau County, successfully winning the election.

== Personal life ==
Montesano has two grown children and resides in Glen Head, New York with his wife Donna and her two children.

New York State Assembly
Preceded by Rob Walker	New York State Assembly, 15th District; 2010 – 2022	Succeeded by Jake Blumencranz
