= Y-50 Cable =

Location
- Country: United States
- State: New York
- From: Dunwoodie Substation, Yonkers, New York
- To: Glenwood Generating Station, Glenwood Landing, New York

Ownership information
- Owner: Consolidated Edison; Long Island Power Authority
- Operator: Consolidated Edison

Construction information
- Commissioned: 1978

Technical information
- Type: Undersea; underground
- Total length: 17.4 mi (28.0 km)
- AC voltage: 345 kV

The Y-50 Cable (also known as the Dunwoodie–Glenwood Line or simply Y-50) is an undersea and underground high voltage electric transmission cable between Westchester County and Long Island via the Long Island Sound and Hempstead Harbor in New York, United States.

== Description ==
The Y-50 Cable travels between the Dunwoodie Substation in Yonkers, Westchester County to the Glenwood Generating Station in Glenwood Landing, Nassau County. It travels under the Long Island Sound between Westchester County and Long Island. The line between Dunwoodie and the Glenwood Generating station is approximately 17.4 miles (28.0 km) – or roughly 91,000 feet (28,000 m).

Y-50 is one of five undersea transmission lines connecting between Long Island and the Continental United States as of 2021 (four of which are operated by NYPA). The line delivers power to – and was constructed and developed as a joint venture between – both the Long Island Power Authority (LIPA) and Consolidated Edison (ConEd). As of 2026, the cable is operated by ConEd.

== History ==
The Y-50 Cable began operating in 1978.

In 2002, the cable experienced a fault that caused a month-and-a-half interruption, after which the operators lowered its usage from its 600 MW capacity down to 400 MW for a few months. It experienced another fault in 2021, at which point it had a 656 MW capacity.

== See also ==
- Cross Sound Cable
- Y-49 Cable
