= Gary Wichard =

American football player and sports agent

Gary Theodore Wichard (pronounced Wish-hard; March 24, 1950, in Brooklyn, New York – March 11, 2011, in Westlake Village, California) was a college football player and professional sports agent.

== Early life and football career ==
Wichard was Jewish, and was raised in Glen Cove, New York, and attended Glen Cove High School. He later lived in Westlake Village, California until he died on March 11, 2011.

In college, Wichard was a two-time All-American quarterback at C.W. Post College. After the 1971 season, he received a Heisman Trophy vote. He was the first C.W. Post player to be named an All-American by both the Associated Press and Kodak. He was also invited to the Senior Bowl All Star Game.

He set school career records in the areas of passing yardage and touchdown passes. In 2011, he was ranked third all-time in career passing yards with 5,373.

Wichard was drafted 412th overall in the 16th round by the Baltimore Colts in the 1972 NFL draft.

== Sports agent career ==
Wichard entered the sports agent business working for sports agent Irwin Weiner. Wichard recruited Colts running back Don McCauley and hockey player Jean Potvin for Weiner, and then set off on his own.

He founded Pro Tect Management Corporation in 1979. Among his first clients were Rob Carpenter of the New York Giants and Richard Todd and Mark Gastineau of the New York Jets. He also represented Brian Bosworth, Keith Jackson, Terrell Suggs of the Baltimore Ravens, Dwight Freeney of the Indianapolis Colts, Keith Bulluck of the Tennessee Titans, Chris Cooley of the Washington Redskins, Jimmy Clausen of the Carolina Panthers, Elvis Dumervil of the Denver Broncos, Darren Sproles of the San Diego Chargers, Antonio Cromartie of the New York Jets, C. J. Spiller of the Buffalo Bills, and Jason Taylor of the Miami Dolphins.

=== NCAA violations ===
Wichard was suspended by the NFL Players Association in December 2010 for having "impermissible communication" with then-college player Marvin Austin, and was investigated by the NCAA regarding his friendship with John Blake. Austin was dismissed from the University of North Carolina at Chapel Hill football team in October 2010; Blake resigned as the team's assistant coach in September 2010. In March 2012, Blake received a three-year show-cause penalty from the NCAA after the organization determined he had received personal loans from Wichard in exchange for access to UNC players. The penalty effectively barred Blake from college coaching during that period.

== Halls of Fame ==
In 2001, Wichard was inducted into the National Jewish Sports Hall of Fame. Wichard was also inducted into the C.W. Post Athletic Hall of Fame.
