= North Shore Central School District =

Public school district in Nassau County, New York

Coordinates: 40.837°N 73.624°W

Address
- 112 Franklin Avenue Sea Cliff, New York, 11579; United States

District information
- Type: Public
- Grades: K–12
- NCES District ID: 3626370

Students and staff
- Students: 2,535
- Teachers: 302
- Staff: 311
- Student–teacher ratio: 8.37

Other information
- Website: www.northshoreschools.org

North Shore Central School District (also known as Central School District No. 1) is a public school district in Nassau County, New York. It serves several villages and hamlets in the North Shore region of Long Island, specifically Glenwood Landing, Glen Head, Sea Cliff, Old Brookville, and parts of Greenvale and Roslyn Harbor. About 2,567 students attend North Shore schools. It has a single high school, North Shore High School.

== History ==
=== Formation ===
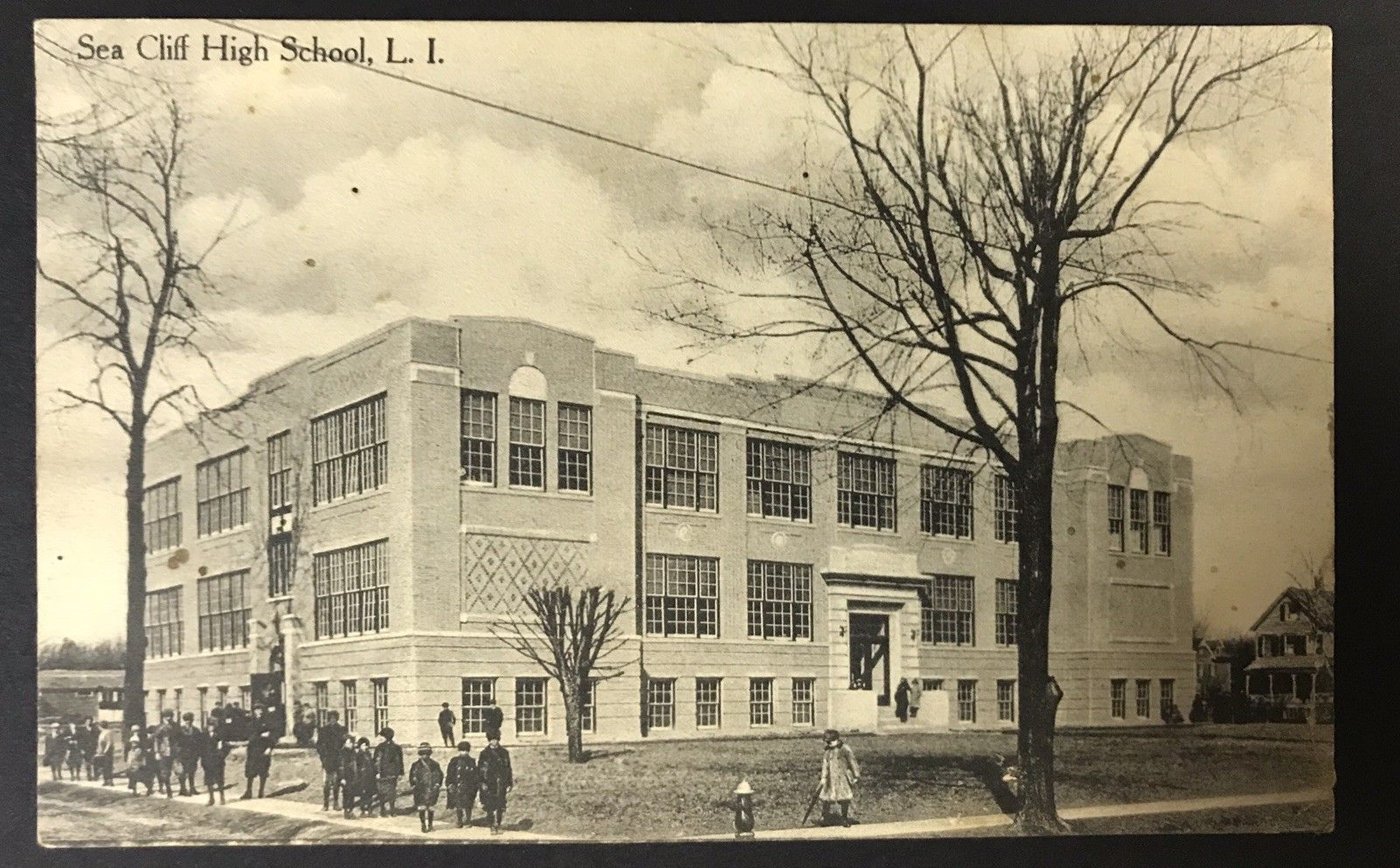
Sea Cliff School in 1914

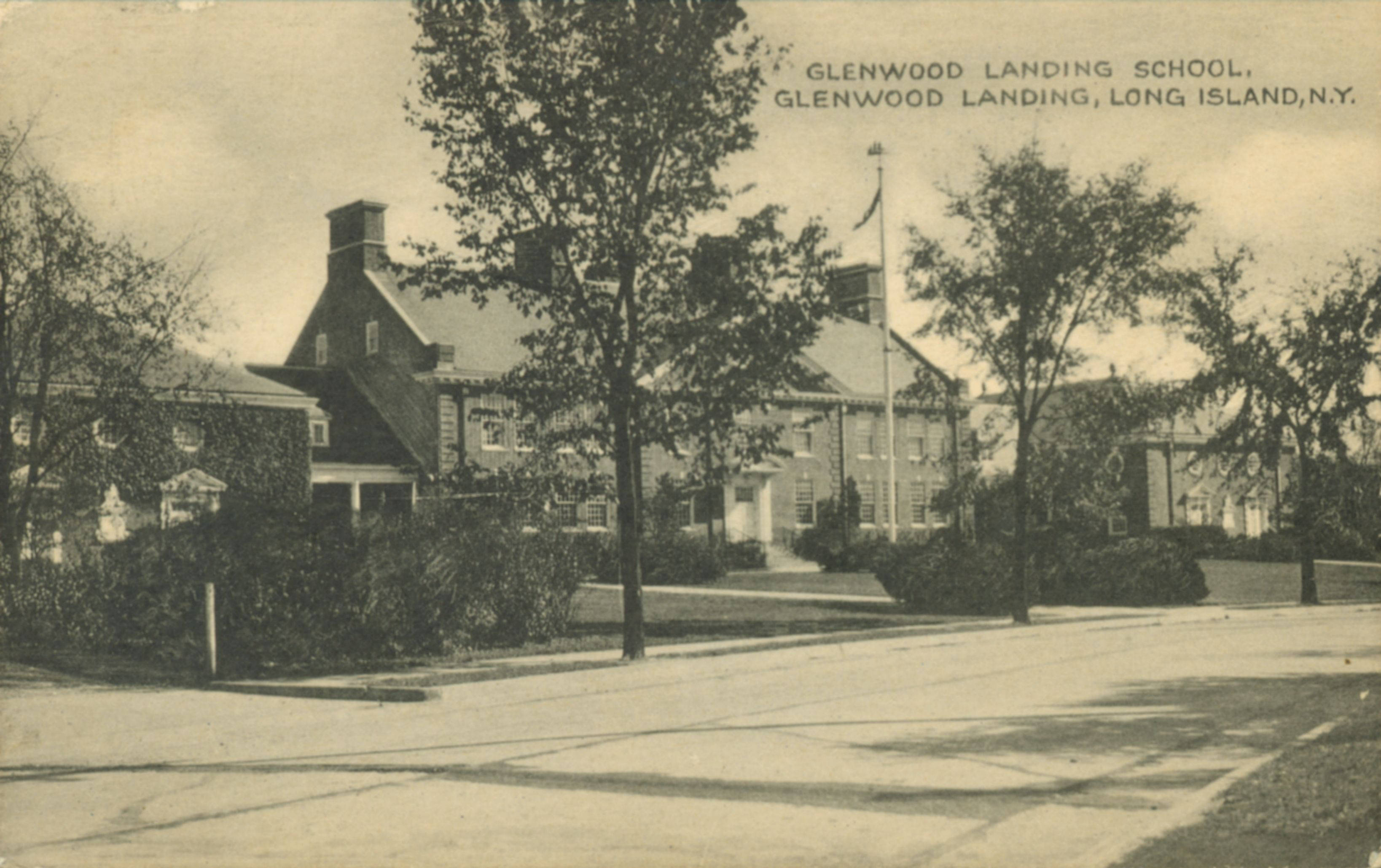
Glenwood Landing School before 1942

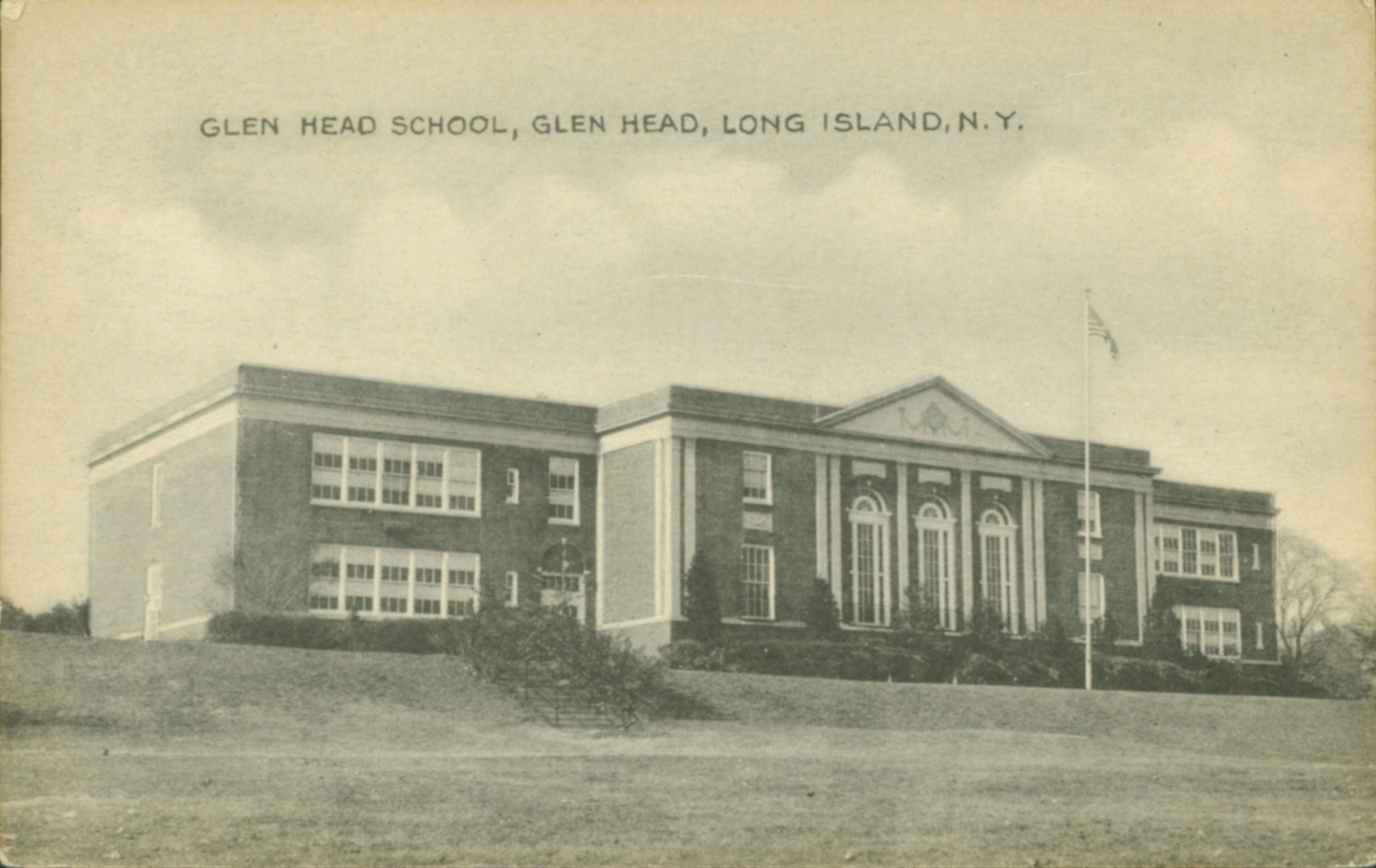
Glen Head School before 1946

North Shore Central School District was formed in 1953 from the smaller Sea Cliff, Glen Head, and Glenwood Landing school districts. The merger was generally opposed by Glenwood Landing residents, who did not want to share the tax revenues from the Glenwood Generating Station, while the other districts were desirous of them. Glenwood Landing Board of Education President William Anderson once explained the situation as "we endure the smoke, let's have the gravy." An earlier vote that year on consolidating the districts failed because that process required the vote to succeed in all three districts individually, while the centralization process only required a simple majority across all voters. It was the first central school district in Nassau County, and was accordingly referred to as "Central School District No. 1" under the numbering scheme of the time.

At the time of centralization, Glenwood Landing School was considered preferable because of its facilities and staff. Glenwood Landing School's "Old Building" had been built in 1927 and its "New Building" in 1949. Glen Head School had been built in 1924. Sea Cliff School had been built in 1912 and expanded in 1926. Sea Cliff School was a K–12 school prior to centralization, while Glenwood Landing and Glen Head Schools did not provide high school education and sent their students to high school in Sea Cliff, Glen Cove, or Roslyn.

The first new building opened by the district was the six-classroom Kissam Lane School in 1956, which would later become North Shore Middle School. Initially a K–3 school, it was designed by Vincent Kling and won national architectural awards for its openness and simple, compact design, with floor-to-ceiling windows and an exterior doorway in every classroom. In 1960, the construction of the junior high school on the site was approved, with the Kissam Lane School incorporated into the new building. It opened in 1961.

The construction of North Shore High School was delayed by a lawsuit by Glenwood Landing residents who wanted to undo the district centralization, but it opened in 1957; it, too, was designed by Vincent Kling. An addition was made to the Glenwood Landing School in 1965.

=== Later history ===
In the 1970s, Sea Cliff School was considered to be in such a state of disrepair that there were several proposals to demolish and replace it, but these were consistently defeated by voters. As of 1977, the district had the lowest property tax rate in Nassau County due to the presence of the Glenwood Generating Station.

Additions were made to Glen Head School in 1994, to North Shore Middle School in 1990 and 1994, and to North Shore High School in the 1990s.

A series of major renovations and additions to all five school buildings was performed in 2000. The most major work included demolishing and replacing the north and south wings of Sea Cliff School. The renovations added 15 classrooms and a new cafeteria and library to the school. During the renovation, Sea Cliff students temporarily used the nearby vacant St. Boniface Parish school building. Additionally, an addition was constructed to Glenwood Landing School, and North Shore Middle School's cafeteria was expanded.

A more minor round of renovations to district buildings occurred in 2014.

The Glenwood Generating Plant was decommissioned and demolished during 2012–2015. Its demolition raised concern about the financial effects on North Shore School District, as the over $20 million annual tax payments from the plant provided 20 percent of the district's budget. This led to fears of a 15–19% increase in residential taxes in late 2014. However, it was determined that according to state law there could be no more than a 1% increase in property taxes for a given tax class as a result of a decreased tax assessment in another class (the four tax classes being residential, cooperatives/condominiums, commercial, and utilities). The financial effects on the district would thus have to be mitigated by increased taxes on remaining utilities in the district, as well as a $2.5 million one-time grant from the state arranged by local state legislators. The site's municipal and school payments in lieu of taxes fell from $23.2 million in 2012 to $16.6 million in 2015.

== Schools ==
Secondary schools:

- North Shore High School (grades 9-12)
- North Shore Middle School (grades 6-8)

Primary schools: (grades K-5)

- Glenwood Landing Elementary School
- Sea Cliff Elementary School
- Glen Head Elementary School
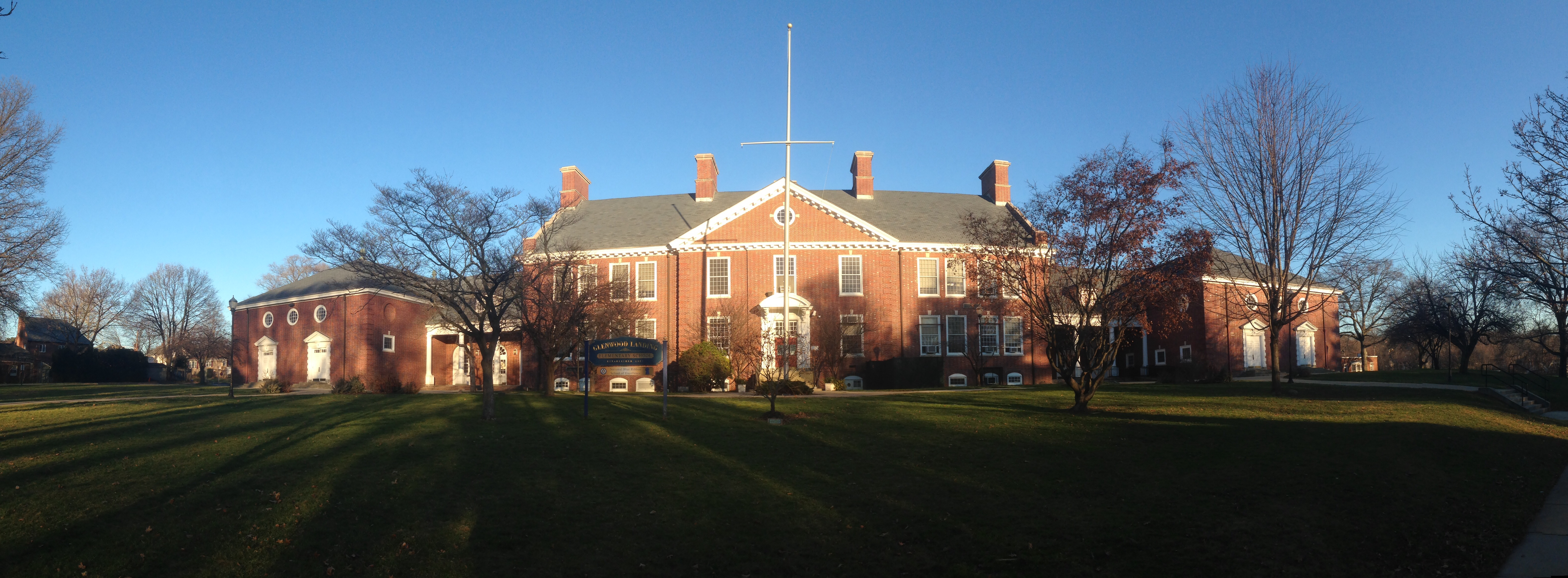
Glenwood Landing School

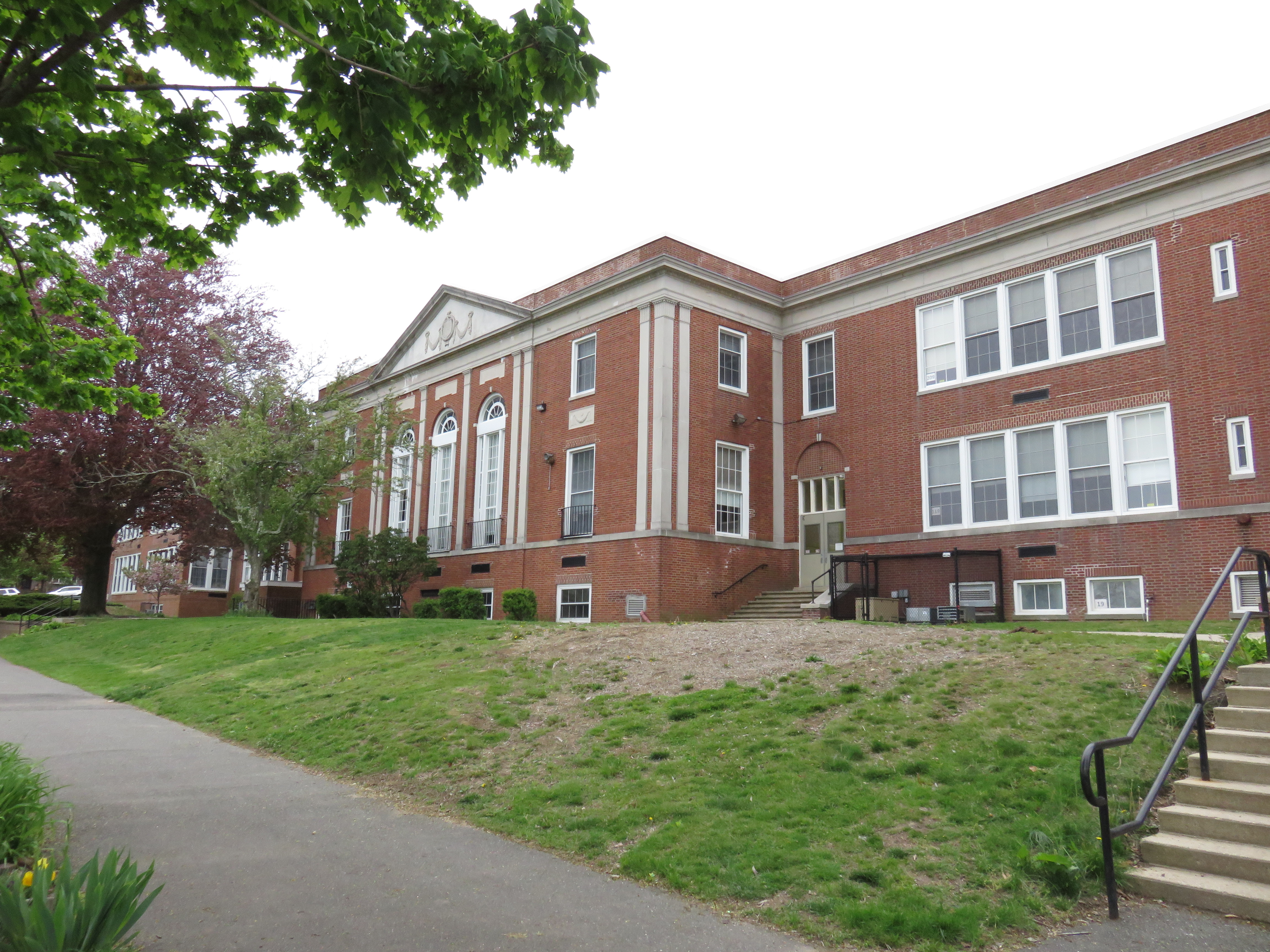
Glen Head School

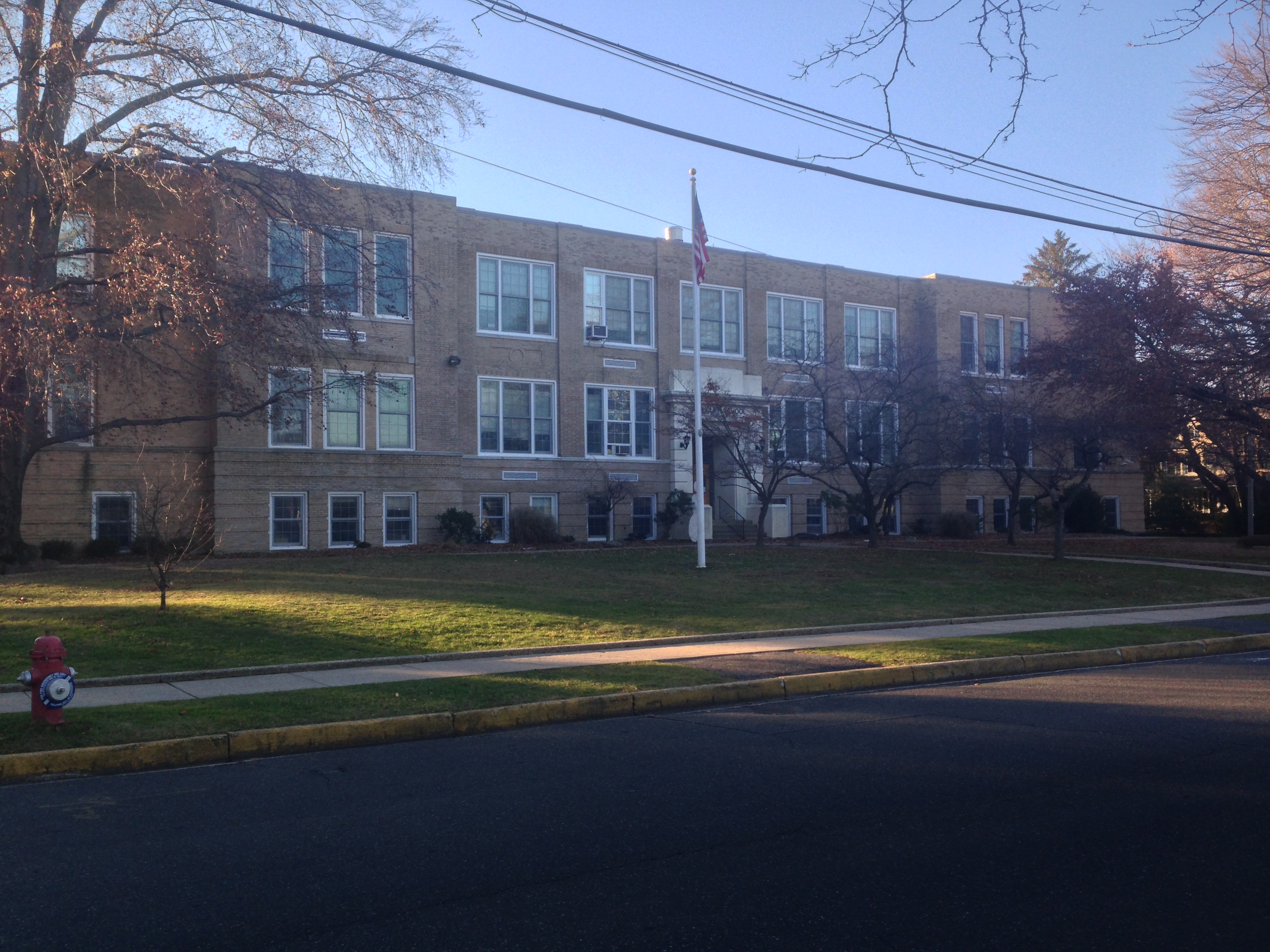
Sea Cliff School

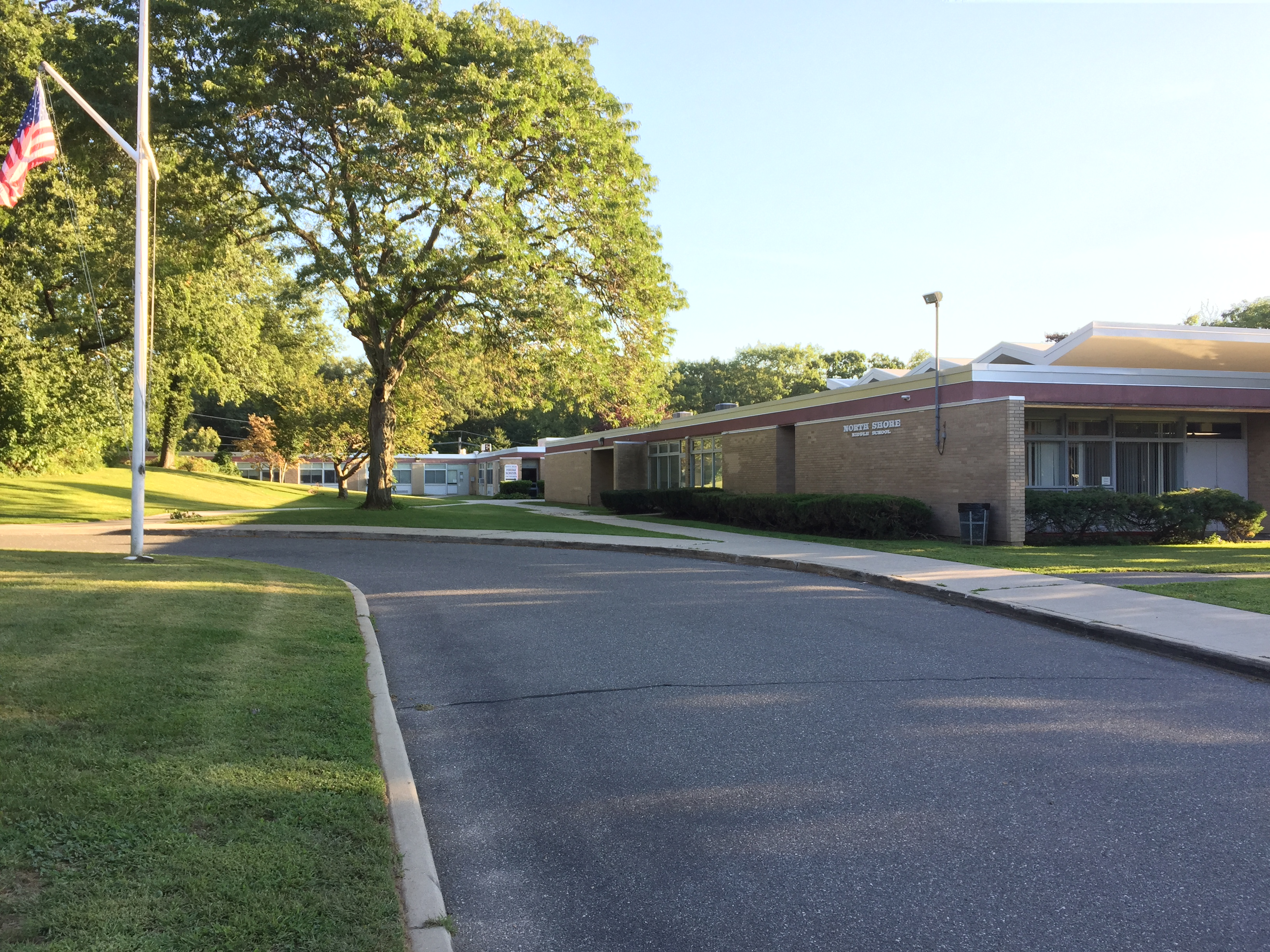
North Shore Middle School

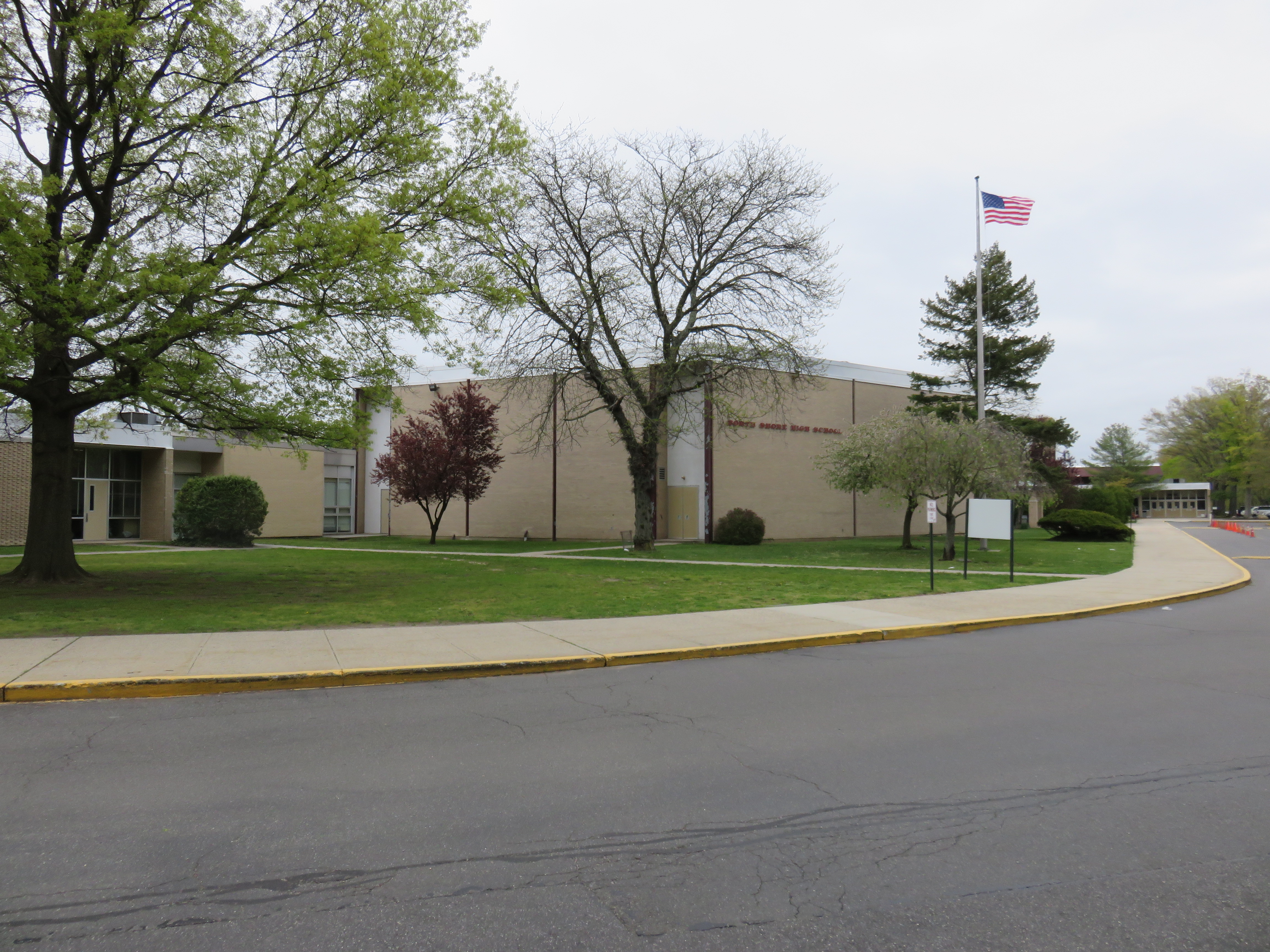
North Shore High School

== Notable alumni ==
- Michael McKean – Actor.
- Kate McKinnon – Actress best known for her work on Saturday Night Live.
- Darin Strauss – Best-selling novelist.

== See also ==
- List of school districts in New York
