= Y-49 Cable =

Y-49 Cable Long Island Sound Cable

Location
- Country: United States
- State: New York
- From: Sprain Brook Substation, Yonkers, New York
- To: East Garden City Substation, Uniondale, New York

Ownership information
- Owner: New York Power Authority
- Operator: New York Power Authority

Construction information
- Commissioned: 1991

Technical information
- Total length: 26 mi (42 km)
- Capacity: 675 MW

The Y-49 Cable (also known as the Long Island Sound Cable or simply Y-49) is an undersea and underground high voltage electric transmission cable between Westchester County and Long Island via the Long Island Sound and Hempstead Harbor in New York, United States. It is owned and operated by the New York Power Authority.

== Description ==
The Y-49 Cable travels between the Sprain Brook Substation in Yonkers, Westchester County (operated by Consolidated Edison) to the East Garden City Substation in Uniondale, Nassau County (operated by NYPA). It travels under the Long Island Sound between Westchester County and Long Island; this undersea section is roughly 8 miles (13 km) in length (the entire line is roughly 26 miles (42 km) long). The average depth of the undersea section is 10–15 feet (3.0–4.6 m) beneath the Long Island Sound's seabed.

As of 2021, Y-49 was one of five undersea transmission lines connecting between Long Island and the Continental United States – and one of four making the connection via the Long Island Sound.

== History ==
The Y-49 Cable began operating in May 1991, and has a capacity of 675 megawatts.

In 2014, the cable was damaged by an anchor from a boat. The incident caused roughly 66,000 gallons of cable insulation fluid to be released into Hempstead Harbor.

As of 2021, there are proposals to upgrade the cable in order to increase its capacity.

== See also ==
- Cross Sound Cable
- Y-50 Cable
