= Roslyn Power Station =

Electrical substation and former power, New York, US

- Country: United States
- Location: Roslyn Heights, Long Island, New York
- Coordinates: 40.784222°N 73.646716°W
- Status: Decommissioned
- Commission date: c.1900
- Owners: National Grid USA (property); Long Island Power Authority (substation)

The Roslyn Power Station was a historic power generating station located at the corner of Power House Road and Willis Avenue within the hamlet of Roslyn Heights, in Nassau County, New York, United States. It is the present location of the Roslyn Yard of National Grid USA and PSEG Long Island – along with a major Long Island Pawer Authority electrical substation, known as the Roslyn Substation.

== Overview ==
The Roslyn Power Station consisted of a two-story plant structure. This building contained the steam-powered generating facilities. The power house was demolished in the 1950s to make room for the then-new Long Island Expressway's construction.

As of 2026, the property is owned by National Grid USA, and contains a yard and facility for that company and PSEG Long Island – along with the Long Island Power Authority's Roslyn Substation.

== History ==
The Roslyn Power Station was built in 1900 by the Roslyn Light and Power Company. This company which was established about the same time as the power station by multiple wealthy estate owners in the Greater Roslyn area – including Clarence Mackay and Robert Winthrop – to provide the community with electricity and to power their nearby Gold Coast estates.

In 1904, the Roslyn Light and Power Company was absorbed by the Nassau Light and Power Company, and the combined company's network soon grew rapidly, eventually covering significant territory in northwestern Nassau County – notably Cow Neck and Great Neck – along with parts of central and southern Nassau County. As the Roslyn Power Station could not adequately provide the needed generating capacity resulting from this growth, the Nassau Light and Power Company constructed the historic Glenwood Generating Station along Hempstead Harbor in nearby Glenwood Landing between 1928 and 1931; it had purchased the land – and was built in the vicinity of that company's original, 1906 plant (Glenwood Generating Station No. 1) – in 1919, in anticipation of future electrical needs. Nevertheless, the Roslyn Power Station property in Roslyn Heights was retained by the company and by 1922 its successor, the Long Island Lighting Company (LILCO), in spite of the plant being rendered largely obsolete by Glenwood. The plant, itself, was eventually taken out of service, but LILCO continued to use the building.

Following the completion of the Glenwood Generating Station, a 138 kV electrical transmission line network with multiple circuits was constructed, linking that facility with a substation at the Roslyn Power Station – along with the Carle Place Substation and East Garden City (Stewart Avenue) Substation further south, with the routing between the Glenwood plant and the Roslyn Substation primarily following the right-of-way of the Long Island Rail Road's Oyster Bay Branch.

In the 1950s, as part of the planning and construction of the Long Island Expressway (I-495) through Greater Roslyn, the State of New York acquired numerous properties – including portions of the Roslyn Power Station property – through eminent domain, to make way for the new superhighway, which would parallel Power House Road (then-NY 25D) through the area. The plant building – located on the part of the property acquired through the eminent domain proceedings, was subsequently condemned and demolished.

Following the 1998 demise of LILCO, many of the company's assets were transferred to its successor, KeySpan – which, in turn, became part of National Grid USA in 2007, after National Grid plc purchased KeySpan. The Roslyn Power Station's property, as of 2026, is owned by National Grid USA.

As of 2026, the property houses the Roslyn Substation, a and National Grid USA's Roslyn Yard.

=== Legacy ===
The Roslyn Power Station is the namesake of Power House Road – a major surface road through Roslyn Heights and East Hills that formerly formed a portion of the now-defunct New York State Route 25D. Since the 1950s, large portions of Power House Road serve as the service roads for the present-day Long Island Expressway – from just west of Mineola/Willis Avenue (CR E64) in Roslyn Heights east to Locust Lane (CR D37) in East Hills (east of which the name of Power House Road changes to Old Westbury Road).

== Roslyn Substation ==
The Roslyn Substation (also known as Substation 4B) is a major electrical substation located on Power House Road in Roslyn Heights, in Nassau County, New York, United States. It is managed by PSEG Long Island, on behalf of the Long Island Power Authority, which owns both the substation as well as Long Island's local transmission network east of New York City (excepting the Rockaway Peninsula).

=== Description ===
The Roslyn substation is located on the grounds of the former Roslyn Power Station, which was built in the early 20th century to provide electricity to the Roslyn community and its Gold Coast estates and demolished in the 1950s for the construction of the Long Island Expressway (I-495). It is fed by multiple 138 kV LIPA-owned transmission lines – including ones originating at the Glenwood Generating Station in Glenwood Landing, the Carle Place Substation in Carle Place, and the major East Garden City (Stewart Avenue) Substation in the East Garden City section of Uniondale.

The distribution lines fed by (and originating at) the Roslyn Substation serve a broad geographical area within the Town of North Hempstead – including much of the unincorporated hamlets of Roslyn Heights and Albertson, along with portions of the incorporated villages of East Hills, North Hills, Old Westbury, Roslyn, and Roslyn Estates.

=== History ===
The Roslyn Substation was first completed by the early 20th century, to connect the area's local transmission network with the electrical distribution lines and power plants – namely, the Glenwood Generating Station and the former Roslyn Power Station. In the early 2020s, it was expanded by roughly 1.34 acres (0.54 ha) and had its equipment modernized by LIPA, as part of its Roslyn Substation Expansion Project.

Between mid-December 2024 and mid-January 2025, following a controversy over drone sightings throughout the New York metropolitan area and the Northeastern United States, the Federal Aviation Administration enacted temporary flight restrictions over 17 electrical substations on Long Island deemed to be "critical infrastructure" – including the Roslyn Substation. The restrictions were lifted over the substation on January 18, 2025.

== See also ==
- Shoreham Nuclear Power Plant
