= Dylan Brady (country singer) =

American pop singer (born 1998)

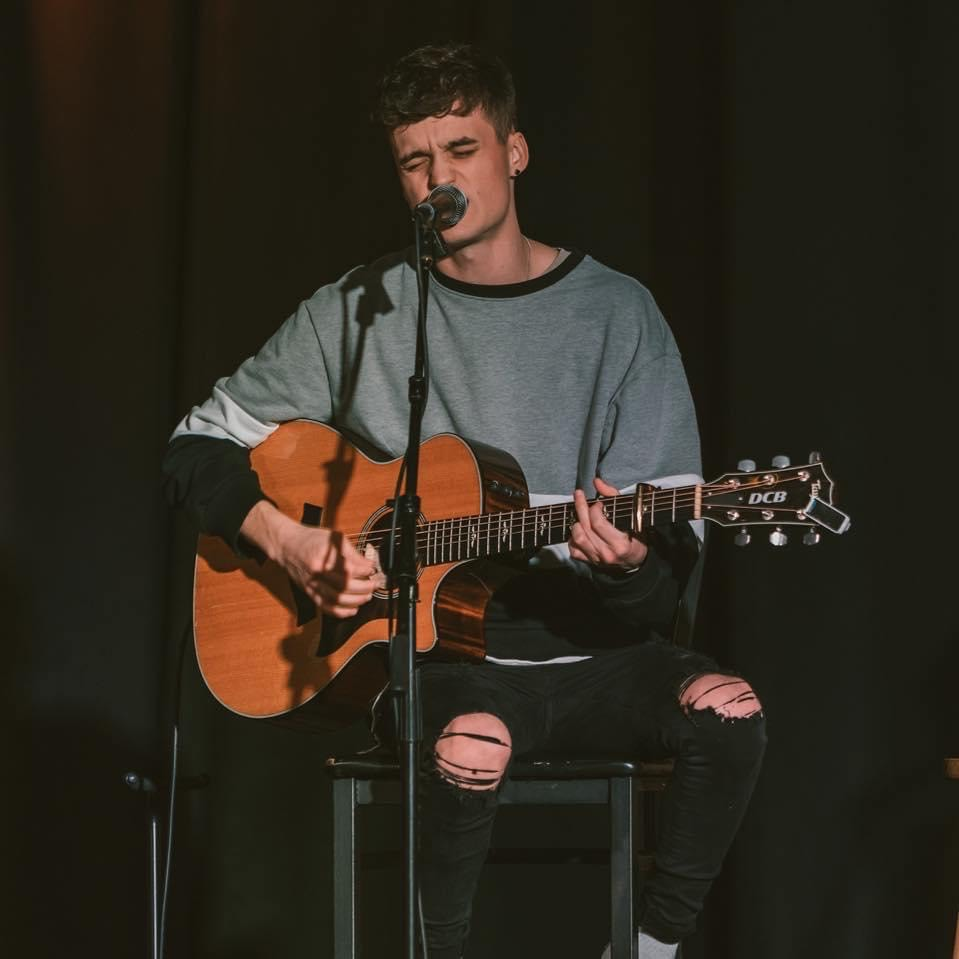

Background information
- Born: October 29, 1998 (age 26)
- Origin: Sea Cliff, New York, U.S.
- Genres: Pop
- Occupation: Singer-songwriter
- Instrument(s): Vocals, guitar, drums
- Years active: 2014–present
- Website: dylancbrady.com

Dylan Brady (born October 29, 1998) is an American pop recording artist, singer and songwriter from Sea Cliff, New York.

== Early life ==
Brady and his twin brother Cody Brady were born on October 29, 1998, to parents John Brady, a musician, and Nancy Brady. He attended North Shore Middle School and High School where he played soccer and hockey.

Brady began playing drums at age six, and soon after began singing. As a young teenager, he played in a duo with his twin, Cody, as The Brady Brothers, citing influences including Bruno Mars and Jason Mraz.

After being diagnosed with Tourette syndrome as a high school freshman, Dylan became a Youth Ambassador for the Tourette Syndrome Association (now called the Tourette Association of America). In that capacity he spoke to school groups to inform children about Tourette syndrome and share a message of acceptance and tolerance. In 2014 he was featured in Disney Channel's "Make Your Mark" series.

== Career ==
The Brady Brothers played at schools around their region and gained tens of thousands of Twitter followers. They opened for Meghan Trainor at the Paramount in Huntington, New York, and performed at the "Hot New Artist Showcase" at the same theater on November 13, 2014.

On August 16, 2015, Dylan appeared at bassist Doug Wimbish's (of Living Colour) WimBash Festival Of Dylan, Wimbish said, "It was music that calmed him down...got him to something that stabilized his life...Singing helped him to deal with his disability and be able to have something to hold on to."

In 2016 Dylan appeared on the Impact Meet and Greet social media tour and opened for Why Don't We. In the summer of that year, he was invited to be a counselor at the Zac Brown Band's Camp Southern Ground, a camp in Peachtree City, Georgia for children with special needs, and he opened for Zac Brown Band at a benefit concert for the camp.

The same year, he signed an artist development deal with Joe Don Rooney of Rascal Flatts. Together Dylan and Rooney produced Dylan's first single, "Shifting Gears," which was released in August 2018.

Brady moved to Nashville, Tennessee on his own in 2016. For a period he studied songwriting at Belmont University in Nashville. He then left college to pursue music full-time, and released his second single, "Fallin'", in September 2018.

Sensitized by his Tourette syndrome and by having been bullied for being a musician, he continued his activism, visiting schools to present anti-bullying messages.

In early 2019 he was signed by Barry Weiss to Weiss's RECORDS label, a joint venture with Sony Music. His first single on the label, "Over Us," which he co-wrote with Jared Scott and Andy Sheridan, was released May 24, 2019. Rolling Stone named the song one of its "10 Best Country and Americana Songs to Hear Now." A video for the single premiered at Taste of Country on June 20, 2019.

Dylan performed at the CMA Music Festival in June 2019, sharing the stage with Keith Urban, Lil Nas X, Cody Johnson, and Dierks Bentley.

His follow-up single, "I Hate California," co-written with Jared Scott and co-produced with Andy Sheridan and Joe Don Rooney, was released August 2, 2019.

== Discography ==
=== Release history ===
Region	Date	Title	Format	Label	REF
Various	August 10, 2018	Shifting Gears	Digital Download	Independent Release	
Various	October 23, 2018	Fallin'	Digital Download	Independent Release	
Various	May 24, 2019	Over Us	Digital Download	Columbia Records / RECORDS LLC	
Various	August 2, 2019	I Hate California	Digital Download	Columbia Records / RECORDS LLC	
Various	September 26, 2019	Boyfriend	Digital Download	Columbia Records / RECORDS LLC	

=== Non-Dylan Brady release credits ===
Year	Album	Artist	Credit	Ref.
2017	Moonlight	Grace VanderWaal	Ukuele	
