= North Shore High School (New York) =

Coordinates: 40°50′18″N 73°37′53″W

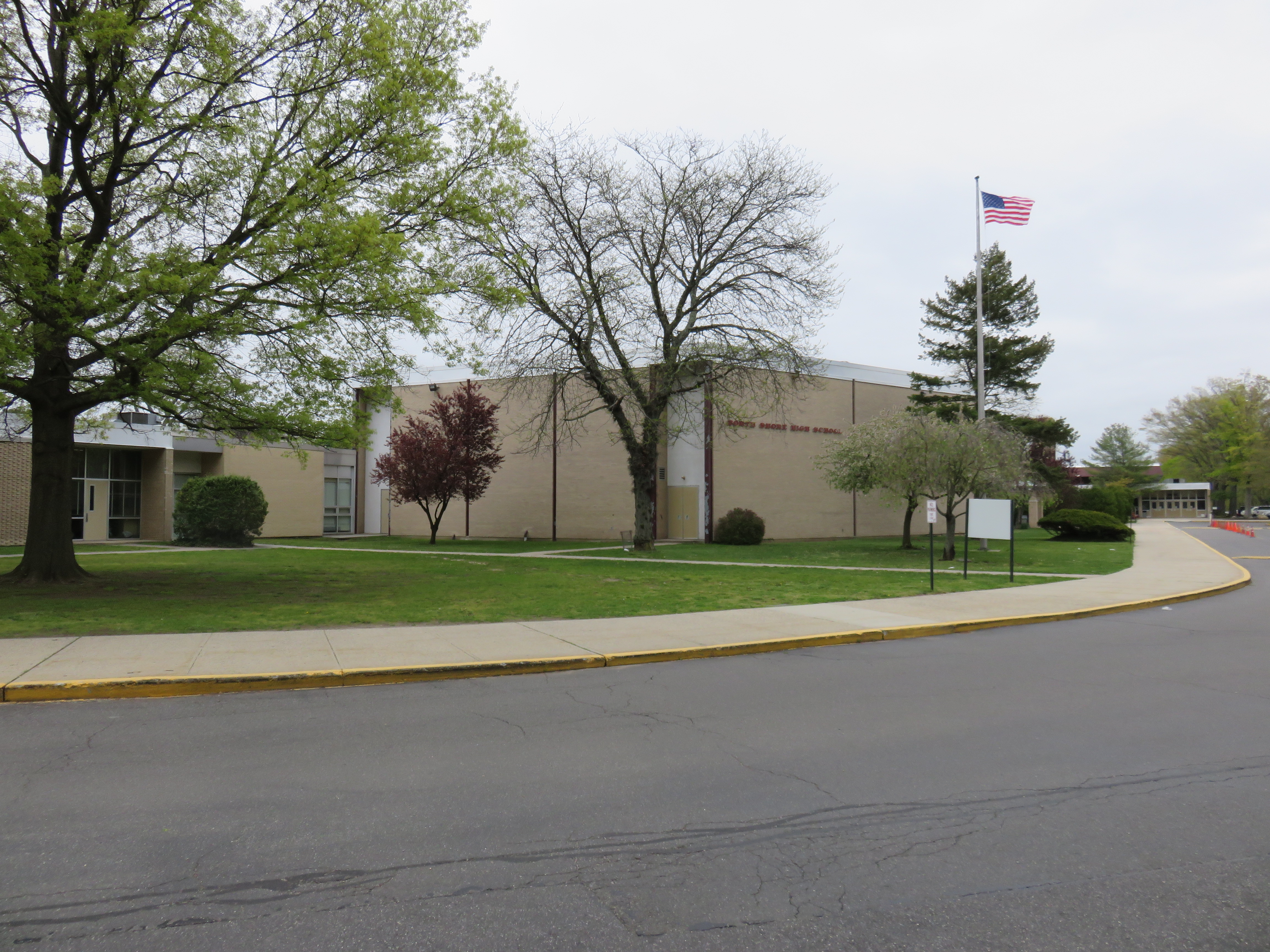
- North Shore High School in 2016

Location
- 450 Glen Cove Avenue; Glen Head, New York 11545; United States

Information
- Type: Comprehensive Public High School
- Opened: September 1957
- School district: North Shore Central School District
- Principal: Eric Contreras
- Faculty: 94.84 (on an FTE basis)
- Grades: 9–12
- Enrollment: 776 (2024–25)
- Student to teacher ratio: 8.18
- Campus type: Suburban
- Team name: Vikings
- Newspaper: The Viking Voice
- Website: www.northshoreschools.org/highschool/

North Shore High School is a public high school located in the hamlet of Glen Head in Nassau County, on the North Shore of Long Island, in New York, United States. It is the sole high school operated by the North Shore Central School District.

== Overview ==
The school is a part of the North Shore Central School District. The current principal is Eric Contreras. In 2024, US News ranked North Shore as the 456th best public school in the country. North Shore's athletic teams are known as the Vikings, and have a long-time rivalry with neighboring Glen Cove High School.

In 2021, North Shore High School was recognized as a 2021 National Blue Ribbon School in the Exemplary High Performing category.

== History ==
The 30-acre (12 ha) property which the school sits on was purchased in 1952 by the Glenwood Landing School District – one of three districts which merged in 1953 to form today's North Shore Central School District. Following the 1953 merger between the Glenwood Landing, Sea Cliff, and Glen Head School Districts which formed the North Shore CSD, construction began on the school, after voters approved its erection during a September 25, 1954 vote. However construction was indefinitely halted shortly thereafter, following the filing of a lawsuit in which two Glenwood Landing residents, on behalf of a Glenwood Landing civic group, sued to try undoing the merger and argued that the North Shore School District could not build the school on the site because it was purchased by one of its predecessors; many Glenwood Landing residents were opposed to the merger, while residents from Sea Cliff and Glen Head were in favor of it – and a state law required school construction to halt if there was a lawsuit in progress concerning the given property.

In December 1954, the New York Supreme Court ruled in favor of the North Shore School District, and in April 1955, the Appellate Division of the New York Supreme Court upheld the decision after the plaintiffs appealed the initial ruling. Construction on the school soon resumed, ending the delay caused by the lawsuit – and the school eventually opened in September 1957; the first class graduated in June 1958. The first principal of the school was Dr. John French. The school was designed by Vincent Kling.

For many years North Shore has had an "open campus" policy, where students were allowed to leave campus during lunch and other free periods so they could work on independent projects. Some community members wanted North Shore to become a "closed campus," where leaving campus was not permitted during free periods. They were concerned due to automobile and pedestrian safety and possibilities of students conducting recreational drug usage off campus.

== Student demographics ==
As of 2025, approximately 776 students attend North Shore High School.

As of the 2024-25 school year, the school had an enrollment of 776 students and 95 classroom teachers (on an FTE basis), for a student–teacher ratio of 8.18:1. There were 98 students (12.6% of enrollment) eligible for free lunch, while 1.8% of students were eligible for reduced-cost lunch.

== Notable alumni ==
- Aron Ain (born 1957, class of 1975), CEO, UKG (Ultimate Kronos Group)
- Devon Archer (born 1974, class of 1992), Businessman and Entrepreneur
- Mac Ayres, (born 1996, class of 2014) R&B musician
- Mike Armstrong (born 1954, class of 1972), a professional baseball player
- Maxwell Azzarello (class of 2005), conspiracy theorist who self-immolated in Collect Pond Park outside the court where Donald Trump's jurors were being chosen in his trial for falsifying business records
- Rose Bird (1936-1999), former Chief Judge of the California Supreme Court
- Hank Bjorklund (1968), former NFL running back with the New York Jets (1972-1974)
- Ed Blankmeyer (born 1954, class of 1972), a professional baseball coach and former second baseman
- Dylan Brady (born 1998), Country Music Singer
- David Chesnoff (born 1955, class of 1973), Criminal Defense Attorney
- Edmund Coffin (born 1955, class of 1973), Olympic Gold Medalist, Equestrian, Summer Olympics 1976
- Jack Doherty (born 2003, class of 2021), YouTube prankster
- Jared Ian Goldman, (class of 1997), film and television producer.
- Robin L. Higgins (née Ross), former Under Secretary for the U.S. Department of Veterans Affairs
- Michael McKean (born 1947, class of 1965), American television and film actor. Noted for playing the character David St. Hubbins in “This is Spinal Tap” as well as Charles “Chuck” McGill in Better Call Saul.
- Eden Ross Lipson (1943-2009, class of 1960), New York Times editor
- Kate McKinnon (born 1984, class of 2002), comedian, Saturday Night Live.
- Catherine McNeur (class of 1999), historian and author.
- Richard Mirabito (born 1956, class of 1974), Pennsylvania Politician,
- Gregory Raposo (born 1985, class of 2003), Dream Street band member
- Jim Romano (born 1959, class of 1977), a professional football player
- Jake Siewert (born 1964), White House Press Secretary
- Amanda Sobhy (born 1993), professional squash player.
- Sabrina Sobhy (born 1996), professional squash player.
- Darin Strauss (born 1970, class of 1988), novelist.
- Julia Wolf (born 1994-1995), musician and singer
