= Glen Cove High School =

Coordinates: 40°52′48″N 73°37′38″W

Location
- 150 Dosoris Lane; Glen Cove, Nassau County, New York 11542; United States

Information
- Type: Public
- Motto: Focused On Success
- Established: 1908
- NCES School ID: 3612180
- Principal: Allen Hudson, III
- Teaching staff: 96.19 FTEs
- Grades: 9th–12th grade
- Enrollment: 1,066 (as of 2023–2024)
- Student to teacher ratio: 11.08
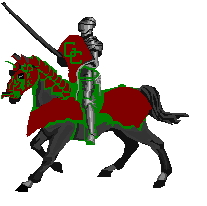
- Campus: Suburban, 50 acres
- Colors: Cardinal and Green
- Mascot: Knight
- Nickname: Big Red, Covers
- Yearbook: Profile
- Website: gchs.glencoveschools.org

Glen Cove High School, commonly referred to as GC, or GCHS, is the only public high school in the Glen Cove City School District. Located at 150 Dosoris Ln., Glen Cove, on the North Shore of Long Island, GCHS sits upon 50 acres (200,000 m^{2}) of land. The current building has been in use since 1962, and prior to that year Robert M. Finley Middle School, the district's current middle school, was used as the high school.

As of the 2018–19 school year, the school had an enrollment of 1,033 students and 67.3 classroom teachers (on an FTE basis), for a student–teacher ratio of 15.3:1. There were 554 students (53.6% of enrollment) eligible for free lunch and 75 (7.3% of students) eligible for reduced-cost lunch.

== Campus ==
Glen Cove High School consists of a two-story building that maintains the shape of multiple rectangles. The high school's facilities include a library-media center, multi-purpose gymnasium, electronic music lab, cafeterias, lecture hall, elevator, auditorium, a state-of-the-art intra-district transmission educational television studio and internet radio station, multiple computer labs including a Mac-specific computer lab, science labs, a physical fitness weight room, and the Old Tappan Road sports complex (adjacent to Old Tappan Rd). There is a courtyard at the center of the structure, yet it is rarely used because of its direct interaction with classes when school is in session. The courtyard is undergoing steps of restoration for it to be accessible by the student body.

The exterior grounds of the high school property have been kept in relatively good condition over the years. Tennis Courts, a wooded area on Old Tappan Rd., approximately three practice fields for football/soccer/lacrosse, two softball fields, two baseball fields, and the J. Cameron Maiden Athletic Field (adjacent to Walnut Rd.) allow for the student-athletes to excel in athletics during the fall and spring seasons.

=== Renovations ===
The high school has recently undergone multiple projects and renovations in order to maintain its structural integrity. The main gym's floor was completely sanded down, repainted (with a brand new floor-design), and redone in the summer of 2009. There was also a complete renovation of the J. Cameron Maiden Athletic Field that included a new eight lane track, four state-of-the-art lights, and new scoreboard. Additionally, new fencing was installed that surrounds the track. Prior to these recently stated renovations, 50% of the high school roof was redone as a result of massive flooding and leaking in the locker rooms and gyms.

Beginning in the summer of 2010 a $3.5 million bond will be put to use to update multiple parts of the district, including new bathrooms and new locker rooms at the high school.

The following projects were eventually completed at the high school as part of the bond and from additional fundraising;

- Track
- Lights
- Scoreboard
- Bathrooms
- Locker rooms
- Roof
- Gym floor
- Concession stands/bathroom

== Academics ==
Glen Cove High School is, and has been licensed to award New York State regents diplomas since its establishment in 1908. There are three different diplomas available at Glen Cove High School: the Local Diploma, the Regents Diploma, and the Advanced Regents Diploma. Two departments of the high school, the foreign language and the fine arts/ music department, have long stuck out as quality departments throughout Nassau County schools. Glen Cove High School offers a wide variety of AP classes, including AP Spanish, AP Literature and Composition, AP World History, and AP Music Theory.

=== Foreign languages ===
Like most other high schools on Long Island, there are a variety of different languages available for interested students to study at GCHS. Currently, two Advanced Placement classes are offered in this department, AP Spanish and AP Spanish Literature. In addition, SUPA Italian is offered, which grants both college credit and the opportunity to take the exam in AP Italian Mandarin-Chinese was introduced in the 2008–2009 school year, and the district hopes to make it a point of interest for students looking for another option when it comes to foreign languages. Languages offered:

- Spanish
- Italian

=== Fine arts and music ===
- Instrumental Studies – the Wind Ensemble, an audition-only band, is for students in grades 10–12, and the Concert Band is typically for students in grades 9–10. Each group performs at the Winter and Spring Concerts in the high school auditorium. The Jazz Ensemble, also an audition only band, generally has multiple performances throughout the school year, performing at the Spring Concert as well as local community events. All students, regardless of band, perform at every home football game as the Big Red Pep Band, and are commonly referred to as "The best bands North of 25A!"
- Choral Studies – The choral section consists of the open Mixed Chorus, audition only Select Chorale, and the smaller afterschool pop choir, The Treblemakers. The Mixed Chorus of Glen Cove High School is for any student interested in an introduction to choral music. Mixed Chorus performs twice a year, at the Winter and Spring Concerts, and is made up of students grades 9–12. The Select Chorale, under the direction of Mr. Edward P. Norris III, has become a staple among the best choirs on Long Island, and is audition only for students grades 10–12. A typical year for the Select Chorale includes multiple performances aside from the Winter and Spring Concerts. Past venues of performance include: Carnegie Hall, Alice Tully Hall, Lincoln Center, The United Nations, Queens College, the invitation-only Disney Honors in Orlando, Florida, and the Heritage Festival at Orlando, Florida. In addition to the prestigious locations previously listed, the Select Chorale has been invited by the New York Mets to perform the National Anthem at Shea Stadium and then Citi Field, and by the New York Islanders at Nassau Coliseum on multiple occasions. The Chorale under the direction of Mr. Norris has won many music competitions all over the east coast, and has excelled at the NYSSMA Major Organization Festival. They have an unbroken record of Level VI Gold and Gold with Distinction ratings. In the past two years they have performed at prestigious events like the New York American Choral Directors Association fall festival and the Westminster Choir College high school showcase. In addition, the several students are chosen to be members of the NYSSMA Nassau All County Choir and the NYSSMA All State Choir.

== Athletics ==
The Glen Cove High School's sports teams are known as the "Big Red", with the mascot a medieval knight on a horse. The school's official colors are recognized as Cardinal Red and Forest Green, with cardinal being the primary color. Originally, Glen Cove High's sports teams were the Glen Cove Knights, but attendance at events was floundering in the 1970s. In an attempt to attract more fans and garner more attention, the nickname "Big Red" began to be used, thanks in large part to the red jerseys of the athletes. Today, both entities have been combined, and GC's team names are the Big Red with their mascot a medieval knight (Exp. Cornell Big Red). Additionally, the 'Covers' has always been a popular nickname used by many alumni as well.

In football, Glen Cove High School is viewed as a "medium" sized school where it competes in Nassau County Conference III. The Big Red have rivalries with the North Shore Vikings and the Locust Valley Falcons, the two nearest high schools to GCHS. Thanks in large part to the difference in school size between Glen Cove and Locust Valley/North Shore other rivalries have sprung up.

=== Men's athletics ===
- Fall Season – Soccer, Golf and Football (JV, Varsity)
- Winter Season – Basketball, Swimming, Rifle, Winter Track and Wrestling (JV, Varsity)
- Spring Season – Baseball*, Tennis and Lacrosse (JV, Varsity)

The 1986 Men's Varsity Baseball Team is to date the only team in Big Red history to have won a State Championship

=== Women's athletics ===
- Fall Season – Soccer, Tennis, Swimming, Volleyball and Cheerleading (JV, Varsity) Kickline (Varsity)
- Winter Season – Basketball, Cheerleading (JV, Varsity) Kickline (Varsity)
- Spring Season – Softball, and Lacrosse (JV, Varsity)

=== Co-ed athletics ===
- Fall Season – Cross Country (JV, Varsity), Cheerleading (JV, Varsity)
- Winter Season – Rifle (JV, Varsity), Winter Track (Varsity), Cheerleading (JV, Varsity)
- Spring Season – Spring Track (Varsity)

== Alma mater ==
The Glen Cove High School Alma Mater is sung and played at the annual graduation ceremony and played by the Big Red Pep Band after every touchdown at home football games. The tune of GCHS's Alma mater is "Our Director". The tune of "Our Director" is quite common. Although not always for the schools Alma mater, it is also used by Harvard, Rice University, Furman University, Elon University, and Hiram College.

== Extracurricular activities ==
Glen Cove High School offers a wide variety of extracurricular activities, which include their award winning newspaper, The Cove-er Times, Masquers Society, Student Senate and Student Government, Ski Club, DECA, National Honor Society, the Treblemakers Pop Choir, Key Club, Anime Club, Tri-M Music Honor Society, GSA, Women's Empowerment Club, Mathletes, Mock Trial, Model UN, and the Yearbook Club.

== Notable alumni ==
- Anthony Bozzella, college basketball coach
- Ashanti Douglas, R&B Singer-songwriter
- Howard Davis Jr., amateur and professional boxer, Olympic Gold Medalist at the 1976 Summer Olympics
- John Edward, psychic
- Carmine Di Sibio, former Global Chairman and CEO of EY, formerly known as Ernst & Young
- Mike Grella, Italian-American professional soccer player, currently a member of New York Red Bulls
- Craig Hansen, professional baseball relief pitcher, Drafted by MLB's Boston Red Sox in 2005
- Carl Karilivacz, former NFL Safety who played for the Detroit Lions, Los Angeles Rams and the New York Giants
- Brian Myers, World Wrestling Entertainment (WWE) professional wrestler
- Peter Philipakos, Greek-American professional soccer player, currently a member of Greek club Ionikos F.C.
- Samuel Pierce, United States Secretary of Housing and Urban Development under President Ronald Reagan
- Joe Rizzo, former NFL Linebacker who played for the Denver Broncos
- Ira Sadoff, poet and professor at Colby College
- Betsy Stark, American media executive, four-time Emmy Award winner, and former broadcast news correspondent for "ABC World News Tonight", "Good Morning America, and "This Week", among others
- Gary Wichard, college football player and professional sports agent
- Desi Wilson, former MLB player for the San Francisco Giants. Currently the hitting coach for the Peoria Chiefs, Class A minor league affiliate of the Chicago Cubs.
