= Paolo Pironi =

American politician

Member-elect of the New York State Assembly from the 15th district
- Assuming office January 2027
- Succeeding: Jake Blumencranz

Personal details
- Party: Republican

Paolo Pironi is an American politician. A member of the Republican Party, he is the member-elect for the 15th district of the New York State Assembly.
