= Glen Cove City School District =

Public school district in New York, US

Glen Cove City School District is a public school district that serves Glen Cove, New York. It currently consists of Glen Cove High School, Robert M. Finley Middle School, and four elementary schools. Two former elementary school buildings are currently in use as private schools.

== History ==
=== Early history ===
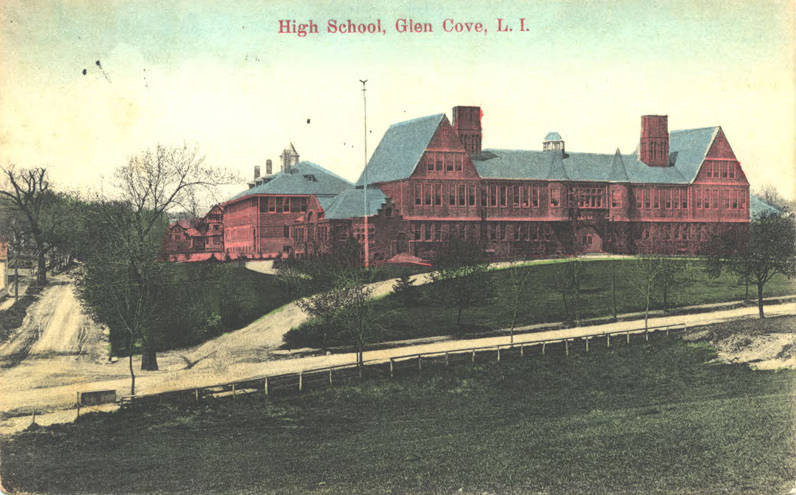
Glen Cove Union School, with the primary school behind and to the left of it, in the early 20th century. These buildings were replaced on the same site with the current Robert M. Finley Middle School and Deasy Elementary School, respectively.

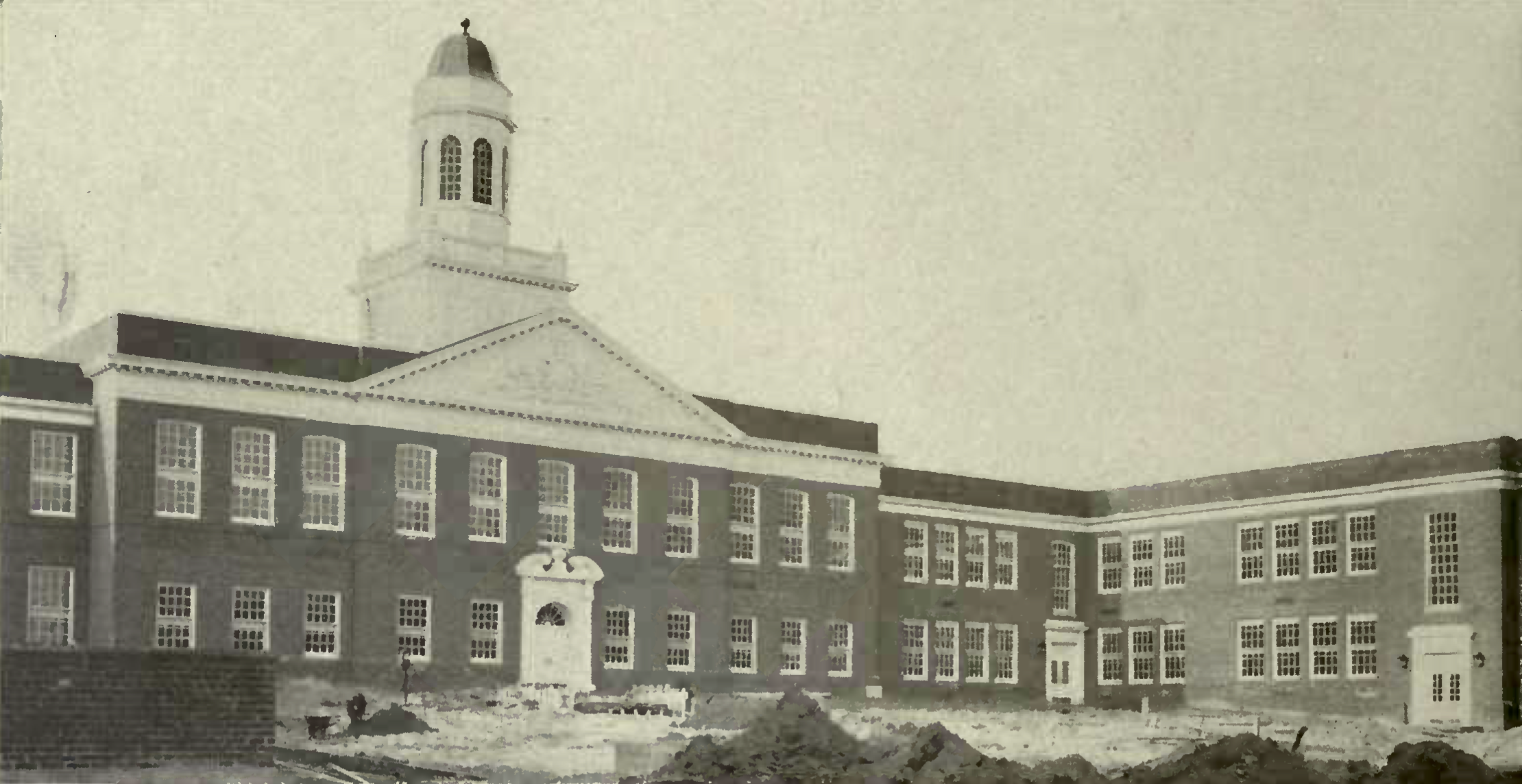
Robert M. Finley Middle School, then serving as the junior and senior high school, in the 1930s

The first schoolhouse in Glen Cove was on School Street. It was replaced in 1821 with a larger schoolhouse on the corner of School Street and Highland Road. In 1857, the district was legally formed as "School District No. 5 of the Town of Oyster Bay", and the schoolhouse was replaced on the same site with an even larger building.

In 1893, the school moved to a new campus on the corner of Forest Avenue and Dosoris Lane. The land was donated by Charles Pratt and reflected his educational philosophy, offering both academic and craftsmanship courses. The school was sometimes referred to as the Union School. A new four-story primary school building was constructed adjoining the main school in 1906. The district was first licensed by the state to award high school diplomas in 1908. Another new building was constructed in 1911, which is now the west wing of Finley Middle School. The primary school burned down in 1926, and was replaced the following year by Deasy School on the same site.

=== Expansion ===
The 1893 building was replaced in 1939 by a new building constructed by the Public Works Administration, which originally served as the junior and senior high school, and is currently Robert M. Finley Middle School. The district also constructed elementary schools in other locations: South School and Coles School in 1930, Landing School in 1932; East School (later renamed Margaret A. Connolly School) in 1955; and Gribbin School in 1966. The current Glen Cove High School was constructed on a 20-acre plot, formerly the Robert Pratt estate, in 1962. The old Pratt house, built in 1925, was then converted into an administrative building.

In 1961, the NAACP named Glen Cove as one of seven school districts in Nassau County having de facto segregated schools, as South School's students were predominantly non-white due to its location in a largely non-white neighborhood. This led to an appeal to the State Commissioner of Education regarding the Glen Cove and Malverne districts, resulting in a 1963 ruling that the latter must end racial imbalance that was eventually upheld by the U.S. Supreme Court. This gave impetus to Glen Cove to do the same, and in 1965, its school board announced a plan to eliminate the racial imbalance by closing South School and redistributing its students to the other elementary schools, which was implemented the following year. This was made possible by the opening of the Gribbin School and a twelve-room addition to the middle school. The South School building remained in use for educational special services and kindergarten.

The Finley School had a new arts and media center and gymnasium constructed behind the main building in 1975, and its west wing was renovated in 1989.

The former Coles School closed in 1992, and the City of Glen Cove bought the building in 2002 and leased it to the Solomon Schechter School until 2011. Tiegerman Schools and Community Services acquired the former South School in 1999 and the former Coles School in 2017 for use as elementary and middle schools for students with speech and learning disorders or autism.

== Schools ==
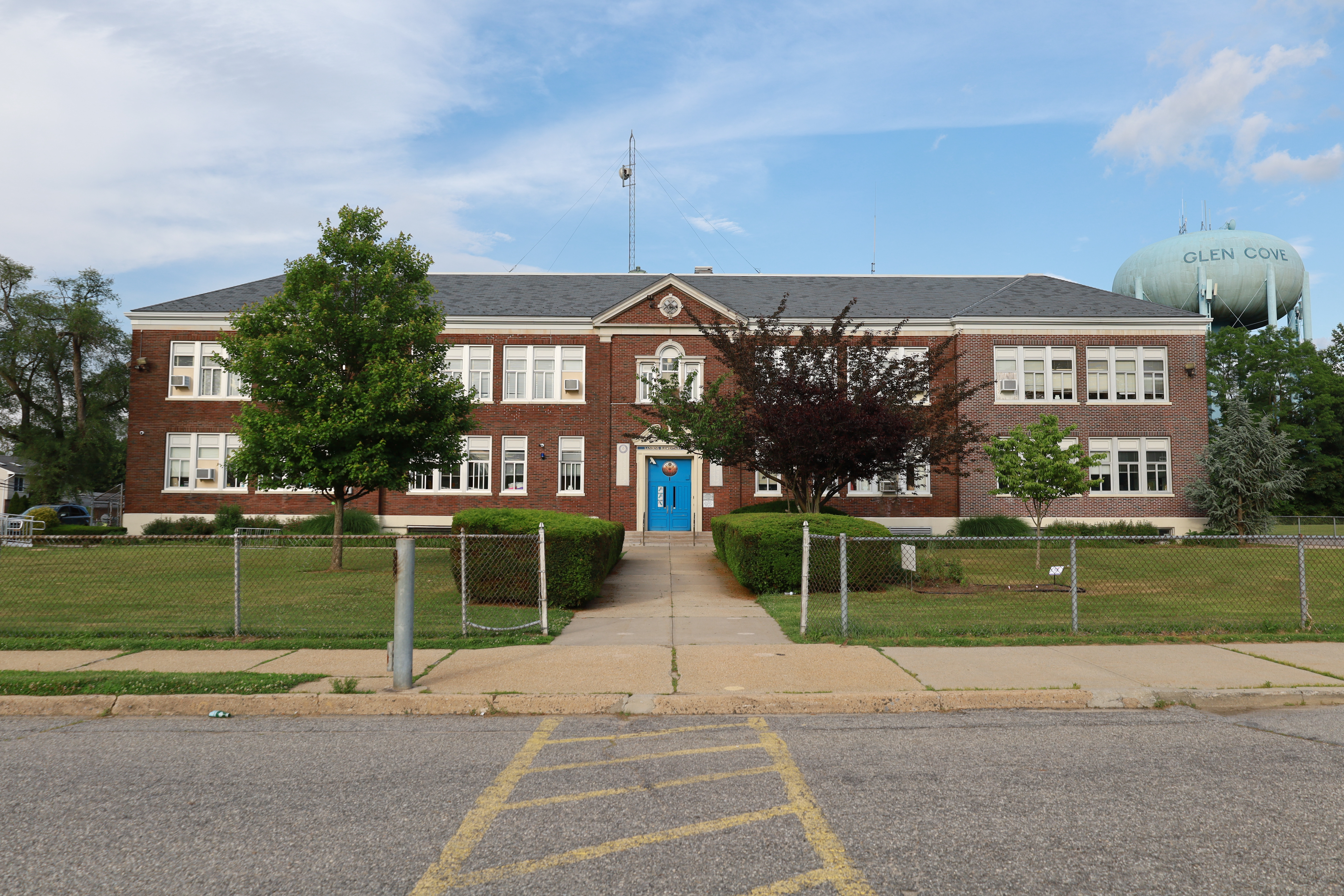
Landing School in 2021

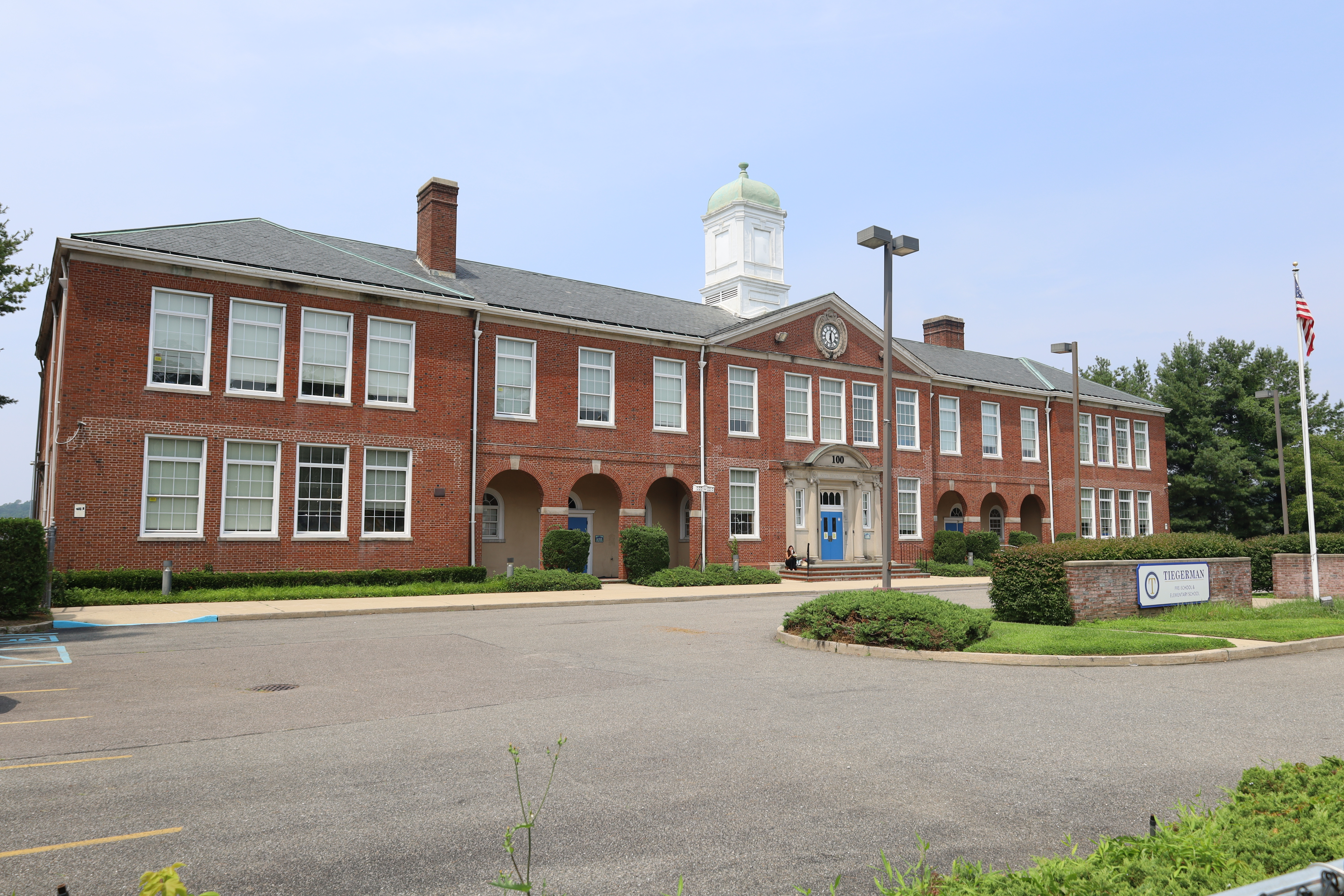
Former South School in 2021

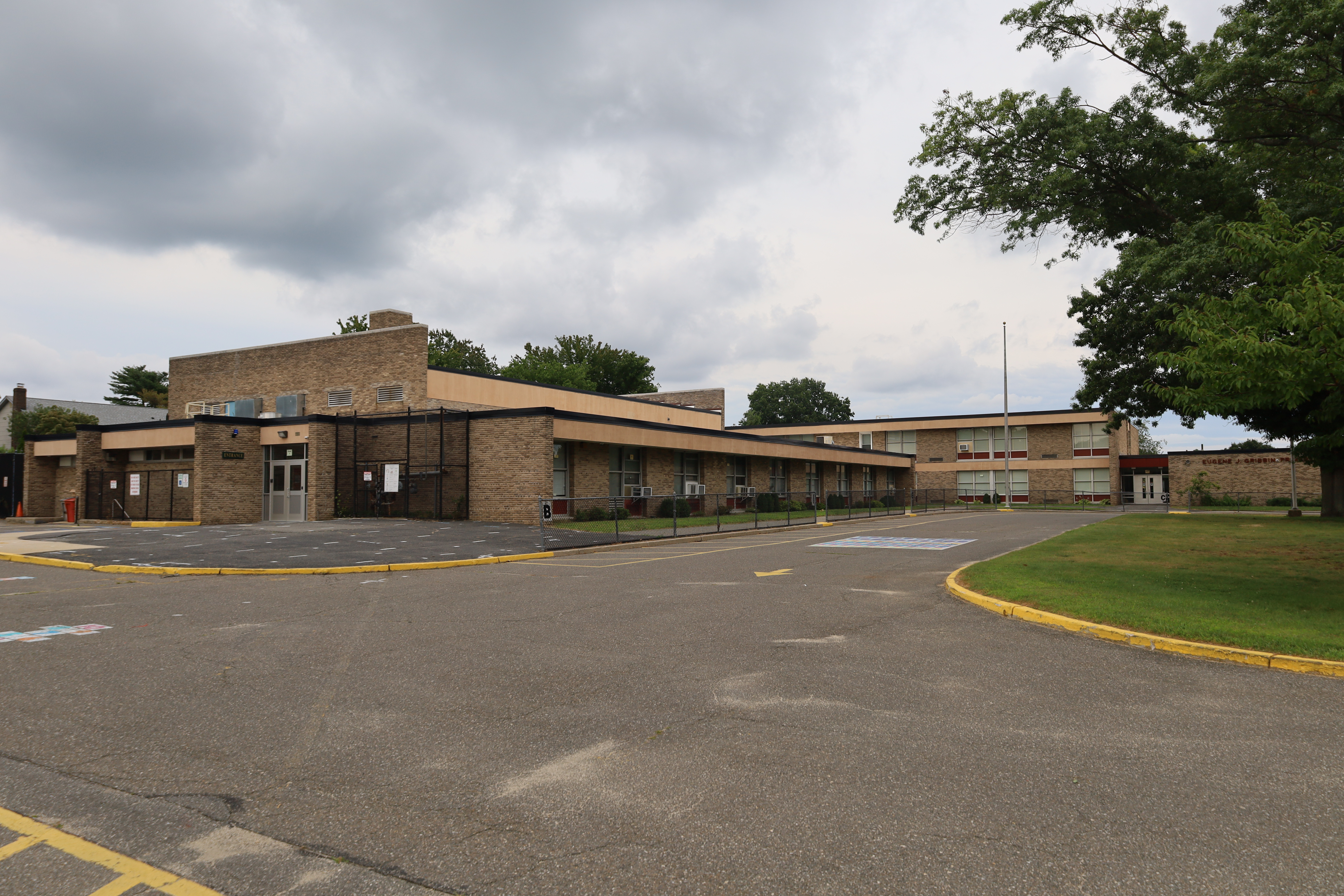
Eugene J. Gribbin Elementary School in 2021

Current

- Glen Cove High School (9–12)
- Robert M. Finley Middle School (6–8)
- Margaret A. Connolly Elementary School (3–5)
- Landing Elementary School (3–5)
- Deasy Elementary School (K–2)
- Eugene J. Gribbin Elementary School (K–2)

Former

- Coles Elementary School
- South Elementary School
