= Jake Blumencranz =

New York politician

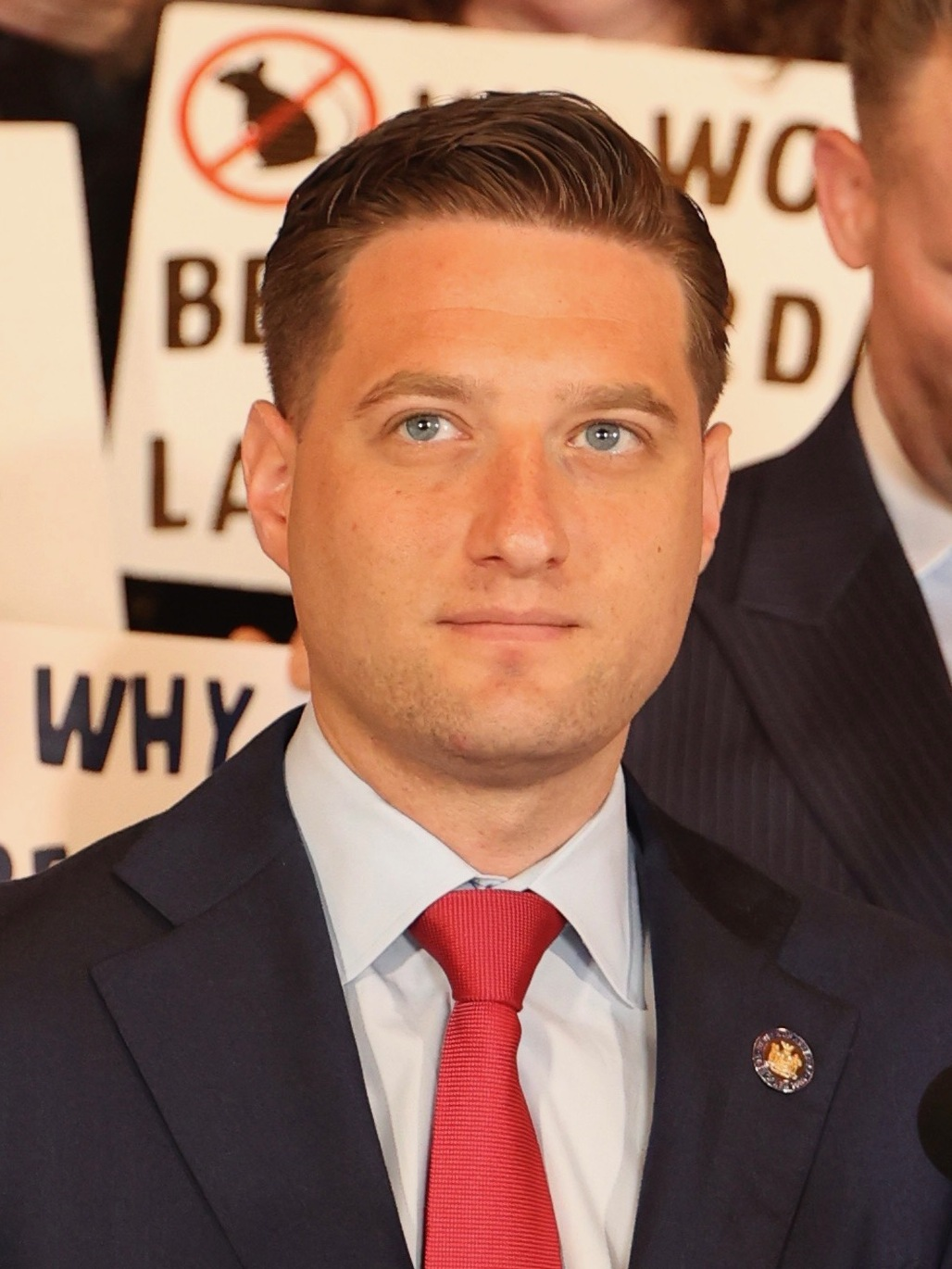
- Blumencranz in 2026

Member of the New York State Assembly from the 15th district
- Incumbent
- Assumed office January 2, 2023
- Preceded by: Michael Montesano
- Succeeded by: Paolo Pironi (elect)

Personal details
- Born: August 7, 1996 (age 30)
- Party: Republican; Conservative
- Education: Rice University (B.A.); The London School of Economics (M.S.)
- Occupation: Businessman
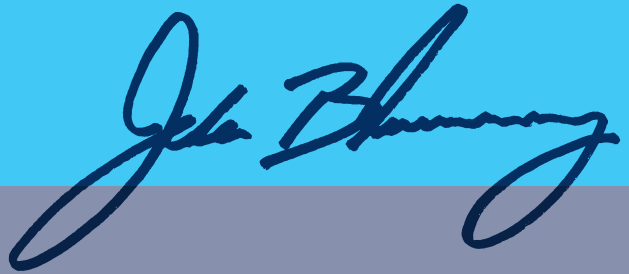
- Signature
- Website: nyassembly.gov/mem/Jake-Blumencranz

Jake Blumencranz is an American politician from Long Island, New York. A Republican, Blumencranz has represented the 15th district in the New York State Assembly since 2023.

== Biography ==
Blumencranz is a resident of Oyster Bay. He earned a Bachelor of Arts in Public Policy and Religious Studies from Rice University and a Master of Science in Regional Urban Planning and Economic Development from The London School of Economics. Prior to his election to the State Assembly, Blumencranz worked as a business executive. He is Jewish.

=== Political career ===
In 2022, Blumencranz ran for Assembly in the 15th district on the Republican and Conservative Party lines. He defeated Democrat Amanda Field with 57.8% of the vote to her 42.2%. Blumencranz emphasized that he was a Millennial, and would give a voice to the younger generation of Republicans on Long Island.

Blumencranz is known for his bi-partisanship, supporting a bill which would offer $2,000 in student loan forgiveness to people who offer mental health support to the incarcerated, in an effort of prison reform. Blumencranz also co-sponsored a bill with Democrat Taylor Darling which would provide EpiPen to all first responders. Blumencranz joined a rally against the Metropolitan Transportation Authority after they hiked taxes by $800,000,000 on his constituents and cut service to many of the communities.

== See also ==
- Josh Lafazan
- Joseph Saladino

New York State Assembly
Preceded by Michael Montesano	New York State Assembly, 15th District; 2023–	Succeeded by Incumbent
