= New York's 15th State Assembly district =

American legislative district

Assemblymember
Jake Blumencranz; R–Oyster Bay

New York's 15th State Assembly district is one of the 150 districts in the New York State Assembly. It has been represented by Jake Blumencranz since 2023, when he succeeded Michael Montesano. In 2026, he announced that he would run for the New York State Senate and not seek re-election to the Assembly.

== Geography ==
=== 2020s ===
District 15 is located entirely within Nassau County. It includes portions of the town of Oyster Bay, including Bethpage, Syosset, Muttontown, Plainview, and portions of the hamlets of Oyster Bay, Hicksville, and Locust Valley.

The district is entirely within New York's 3rd congressional district, and overlaps the 5th and 7th districts of the New York State Senate.

=== 2010s ===
District 15 is in Nassau County. It contains the town of Oyster Bay and portions of Hicksville.

== Recent election results ==
=== 2026 ===
2026 New York State Assembly election, District 15
Party	Candidate	Votes	%
Republican	Paolo Pironi		
Conservative	Paolo Pironi		
Total	Paolo Pironi		
Democratic	Dean Tarulli		
Write-in			
Total votes			

=== 2024 ===
2024 New York State Assembly election, District 15
Party	Candidate	Votes	%
Republican	Jake Blumencranz	35,819	
Conservative	Jake Blumencranz	3,028	
Total	Jake Blumencranz (incumbent)	38,847	58.0
Democratic	William Murphy	28,081	41.9
Write-in		103	0.1
Total votes		67,031	
Republican hold			

=== 2022 ===
2022 New York State Assembly election, District 15
Party	Candidate	Votes	%
Republican	Jake Blumencranz	27,285	
Conservative	Jake Blumencranz	2,625	
Total	Jake Blumencranz	29,910	57.8
Democratic	Amanda Field	21,849	42.2
Write-in		23	0.0
Total votes		51,782	100.0
Republican hold			

=== 2020 ===
2020 New York State Assembly election, District 15
Party	Candidate	Votes	%
Republican	Michael Montesano	33,011	
Conservative	Michael Montesano	2,973	
Independence	Michael Montesano	531	
Libertarian	Michael Montesano	335	
Total	Michael Montesano (incumbent)	36,850	55.7
Democratic	Joseph Sackman III	28,013	
Working Families	Joseph Sackman III	1,318	
Total	Joseph Sackman III	29,331	44.3
Write-in		17	0.0
Total votes		66,198	100.0
Republican hold			

=== 2018 ===
2018 New York State Assembly election, District 15
Party	Candidate	Votes	%
Republican	Michael Montesano	22,022	
Conservative	Michael Montesano	2,357	
Independence	Michael Montesano	412	
Reform	Michael Montesano	111	
Total	Michael Montesano (incumbent)	24,902	52.6
Democratic	Allen Foley	21,673	
Working Families	Allen Foley	462	
Women's Equality	Allen Foley	317	
Total	Allen Foley	22,452	47.4
Write-in		17	0.0
Total votes		47,363	100.0
Republican hold			

=== 2016 ===
2016 New York State Assembly election, District 15
Party	Candidate	Votes	%
Republican	Michael Montesano	28,354	
Conservative	Michael Montesano	3,188	
Reform	Michael Montesano	274	
Total	Michael Montesano (incumbent)	31,816	55.6
Democratic	Dean Hart	23,333	
Working Families	Dean Hart	977	
Independence	Dean Hart	682	
Women's Equality	Dean Hart	389	
Total	Dean Hart	25,381	44.3
Write-in		32	0.1
Total votes		57,229	100.0
Republican hold			

=== 2014 ===
2014 New York State Assembly election, District 15
Party	Candidate	Votes	%
Republican	Michael Montesano	16,190	
Conservative	Michael Montesano	2,551	
Independence	Michael Montesano	770	
Tax Revolt Party	Michael Montesano	161	
Total	Michael Montesano (incumbent)	19,672	66.7
Democratic	Mario Ferone	9,801	33.3
Write-in		10	0.1
Total votes		29,483	100.0
Republican hold			

=== 2012 ===
2012 New York State Assembly election, District 15
Party	Candidate	Votes	%
Republican	Michael Montesano	23,740	
Conservative	Michael Montesano	3,094	
Independence	Michael Montesano	898	
Tax Revolt Party	Michael Montesano	222	
Total	Michael Montesano (incumbent)	27,954	59.6
Democratic	Mario Ferone	18,951	40.4
Write-in		15	0.0
Total votes		46,920	100.0
Republican hold			

=== 2010 ===
2010 New York State Assembly election, District 15
Party	Candidate	Votes	%
Republican	Michael Montesano	18,077	
Conservative	Michael Montesano	2,526	
Independence	Michael Montesano	915	
Tax Revolt Party	Michael Montesano	88	
Total	Michael Montesano (incumbent)	21,606	62.9
Democratic	Leon Hart	11,965	
Working Families	Leon Hart	765	
Total	Leon Hart	12,730	37.1
Write-in		4	0.0
Total votes		34,340	100.0
Republican hold			

=== 2010 special ===
2010 New York State Assembly special election, District 15
Party	Candidate	Votes	%
Republican	Michael Montesano	3,160	
Conservative	Michael Montesano	631	
Independence	Michael Montesano	268	
Total	Michael Montesano	4,059	71.1
Democratic	Matthew Meng	1,652	28.9
Write-in		0	0.0
Total votes		5,711	100.0
Republican hold			
