= Glenwood Landing, New York =

- Hamlet and census-designated place
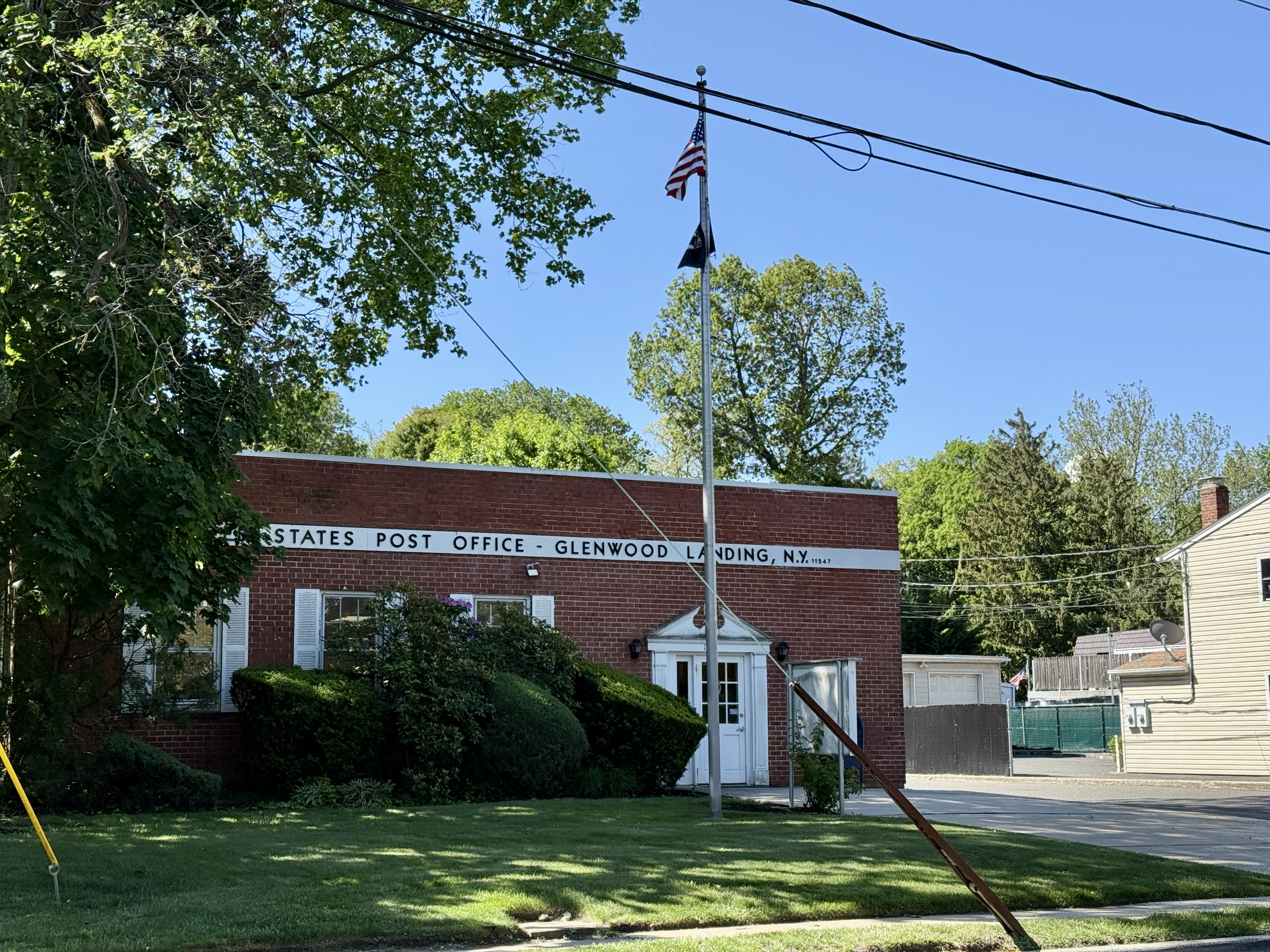
- The Glenwood Landing Post Office in 2025
- Nicknames: "Glenwood"; "The Landing"
- Location in Nassau County and the state of New York

- Location on Long Island Location within the state of New York
- Coordinates: 40°49′42″N 73°38′5″W
- Country: United States
- State: New York
- County: Nassau County
- Towns: North Hempstead; Oyster Bay

Area
  - Total: 0.97 sq mi (2.51 km^{2})
  - Land: 0.97 sq mi (2.51 km^{2})
  - Water: 0 sq mi (0.00 km^{2})
- Elevation: 98 ft (30 m)

Population (2020)
  - Total: 3,948
  - Density: 4,072.0/sq mi (1,572.21/km^{2})
- Time zone: UTC-5 (Eastern (EST))
  - Summer (DST): UTC-4 (EDT)
- ZIP Codes: 11547 (Glenwood Landing); 11545 (Glen Head); 11548 (Greenvale)
- Area codes: 516, 363
- FIPS code: 36-29421
- GNIS feature ID: 0951253

Glenwood Landing is a hamlet and census-designated place (CDP) in Nassau County, on the North Shore of Long Island, in New York, United States. The population was 3,948 at the time of the 2020 census. It is considered part of the greater Glen Cove area, which is anchored by the City of Glen Cove.

Glenwood Landing is mainly within the Town of Oyster Bay – spare for a small section in the southwest corner, which is located within the Town of North Hempstead.

== Geography ==
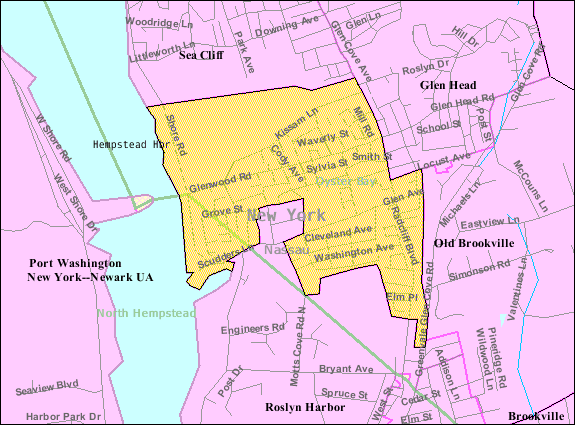
U.S. Census map of Glenwood Landing

According to the United States Census Bureau, the CDP has a total area of 1.0 square mile (2.6 km^{2}), all land.

=== Climate ===
According to the Köppen climate classification, Glenwood Landing has a Humid subtropical climate (type Cfa) with cool, wet winters and hot, humid summers. Precipitation is uniform throughout the year, with slight spring and fall peaks.

Climate data for Glenwood Landing, New York
Month	Jan	Feb	Mar	Apr	May	Jun	Jul	Aug	Sep	Oct	Nov	Dec	Year
Record high °F (°C)	71 (22)	73 (23)	87 (31)	94 (34)	97 (36)	101 (38)	108 (42)	105 (41)	97 (36)	89 (32)	83 (28)	76 (24)	108 (42)
Mean daily maximum °F (°C)	40.4 (4.7)	42.9 (6.1)	51.1 (10.6)	61.2 (16.2)	70.6 (21.4)	79.6 (26.4)	84.5 (29.2)	83.3 (28.5)	76.0 (24.4)	65.4 (18.6)	55.7 (13.2)	45.1 (7.3)	63.0 (17.2)
Daily mean °F (°C)	33.4 (0.8)	35.0 (1.7)	42.0 (5.6)	51.8 (11.0)	60.8 (16.0)	70.1 (21.2)	75.2 (24.0)	74.1 (23.4)	67.2 (19.6)	56.5 (13.6)	47.8 (8.8)	38.2 (3.4)	54.3 (12.4)
Mean daily minimum °F (°C)	26.4 (−3.1)	27.1 (−2.7)	33.5 (0.8)	42.4 (5.8)	51.0 (10.6)	60.6 (15.9)	65.8 (18.8)	65.0 (18.3)	58.3 (14.6)	47.6 (8.7)	39.9 (4.4)	31.2 (−0.4)	45.7 (7.6)
Record low °F (°C)	−4 (−20)	−5 (−21)	5 (−15)	13 (−11)	34 (1)	43 (6)	50 (10)	46 (8)	36 (2)	27 (−3)	17 (−8)	−2 (−19)	−5 (−21)
Average precipitation inches (mm)	3.56 (90)	2.87 (73)	4.47 (114)	3.85 (98)	3.23 (82)	3.54 (90)	3.97 (101)	4.26 (108)	4.31 (109)	4.08 (104)	3.18 (81)	3.99 (101)	45.31 (1,151)
Average snowfall inches (cm)	5.5 (14)	7.8 (20)	3.7 (9.4)	0.3 (0.76)	0 (0)	0 (0)	0 (0)	0 (0)	0 (0)	0 (0)	0.2 (0.51)	5.7 (14)	23.2 (58.67)
Average relative humidity (%)	73	75	72	72	75	74	73	71	73	73	71	75	73
Mean monthly sunshine hours	177	153	172	167	202	213	237	241	215	190	210	171	2,348
Average ultraviolet index	2	2	2	3	5	6	6	6	5	3	2	2	4
Source: NOAA; Weather Atlas

== Demographics ==
Historical population
Census	Pop.	Note	%±
2000	3,541		—
2010	3,379		−4.6%
2020	3,948		16.8%
U.S. Decennial Census

=== 2020 census ===
As of the 2020 census, Glenwood Landing had a population of 3,948. The median age was 45.0 years. 21.8% of residents were under the age of 18 and 19.3% of residents were 65 years of age or older. For every 100 females there were 93.2 males, and for every 100 females age 18 and over there were 90.2 males age 18 and over.

100.0% of residents lived in urban areas, while 0.0% lived in rural areas.

There were 1,375 households in Glenwood Landing, of which 34.8% had children under the age of 18 living in them. Of all households, 64.5% were married-couple households, 10.5% were households with a male householder and no spouse or partner present, and 21.0% were households with a female householder and no spouse or partner present. About 17.0% of all households were made up of individuals and 10.5% had someone living alone who was 65 years of age or older.

There were 1,422 housing units, of which 3.3% were vacant. The homeowner vacancy rate was 1.1% and the rental vacancy rate was 4.4%.

Racial composition as of the 2020 census
Race	Number	Percent
White	3,295	83.5%
Black or African American	25	0.6%
American Indian and Alaska Native	8	0.2%
Asian	240	6.1%
Native Hawaiian and Other Pacific Islander	1	0.0%
Some other race	107	2.7%
Two or more races	272	6.9%
Hispanic or Latino (of any race)	355	9.0%

=== 2010 census ===
As of the 2010 census, there were 3,379 people residing within Glenwood Landing. the population was 92.9% White, 88.2% Non-Hispanic White, 0.8% Black or African American, 3.7% Asian, 1% from other races, and 1.5% from two or more races. Hispanic or Latino of any race were 6.1% of the population.

=== 2000 census ===
As of the census of 2000, there were 3,541 people, 1,262 households, and 1,009 families residing in the CDP. The population density was 3,595.6 inhabitants per square mile (1,388.3/km^{2}). There were 1,284 housing units at an average density of 1,303.8 per square mile (503.4/km^{2}). The racial makeup of the CDP was 95.37% White, 0.28% African American, 2.60% Asian, 0.59% from other races, and 1.16% from two or more races. Hispanic or Latino of any race were 3.33% of the population.

There were 1,262 households, out of which 37.6% had children under the age of 18 living with them, 67.1% were married couples living together, 9.5% had a female householder with no husband present, and 20.0% were non-families. 17.0% of all households were made up of individuals, and 8.3% had someone living alone who was 65 years of age or older. The average household size was 2.81 and the average family size was 3.17.

In the CDP, the population was spread out, with 26.2% under the age of 18, 4.7% from 18 to 24, 27.4% from 25 to 44, 25.4% from 45 to 64, and 16.2% who were 65 years of age or older. The median age was 40 years. For every 100 females, there were 87.4 males. For every 100 females age 18 and over, there were 86.8 males.

The median income for a household in the CDP was $78,341, and the median income for a family was $90,784. Males had a median income of $68,939 versus $35,833 for females. The per capita income for the CDP was $33,689. About 1.0% of families and 2.4% of the population were below the poverty line, including none of those under age 18 and 4.4% of those age 65 or over.

== Government ==
=== Town representation ===
As Glenwood Landing is an unincorporated hamlet, it is directly governed by the Towns of North Hempstead and Oyster Bay.

The parts of Glenwood Landing in the Town of North Hempstead are located in its 2nd council district, which as of March 2024 is represented on the North Hempstead Town Council by Edward W. Scott III (R–Albertson).

=== Representation in higher government ===
==== Nassau County representation ====
Glenwood Landing is located in Nassau County's 11th Legislative district, which as of March 2024 is represented in the Nassau County Legislature by Delia DiRiggi-Whitton (D–Glen Cove).

==== New York State representation ====
===== New York State Assembly =====
Glenwood Landing is split between the New York State Assembly's 13th and 15th State Assembly districts, which as of March 2024 are represented by Charles D. Lavine (D–Glen Cove) and Jacob Ryan Blumencranz (R–Oyster Bay), respectively.

===== New York State Senate =====
Glenwood Landing is located within the New York State Senate's 7th State Senate district, which as of March 2024 is represented in the New York State Senate by Jack M. Martins (R–Old Westbury).

==== Federal representation ====
===== United States Congress =====
Glenwood Landing is located within New York's 3rd congressional district, which as of March 2024 is represented in the United States Congress by Thomas R. Suozzi (D–Glen Cove).

==== United States Senate ====
Like the rest of New York, Glenwood Landing is represented in the United States Senate by Charles E. Schumer (D) and Kirsten E. Gillibrand (D).

== Education ==
=== School district ===
Glenwood Landing is served by the North Shore Central School District.

=== Library district ===
Glenwood Landing, in its entirety, is located within the boundaries of the Gold Coast Library District, which is served by the Gold Coast Public Library.

== See also ==
- List of census-designated places in New York
- Glenwood Generating Station
- Harry Tappen Beach, Marina, and Pool
