= Glenwood Generating Station =

Power station in Glenwood Landing, New York, United States

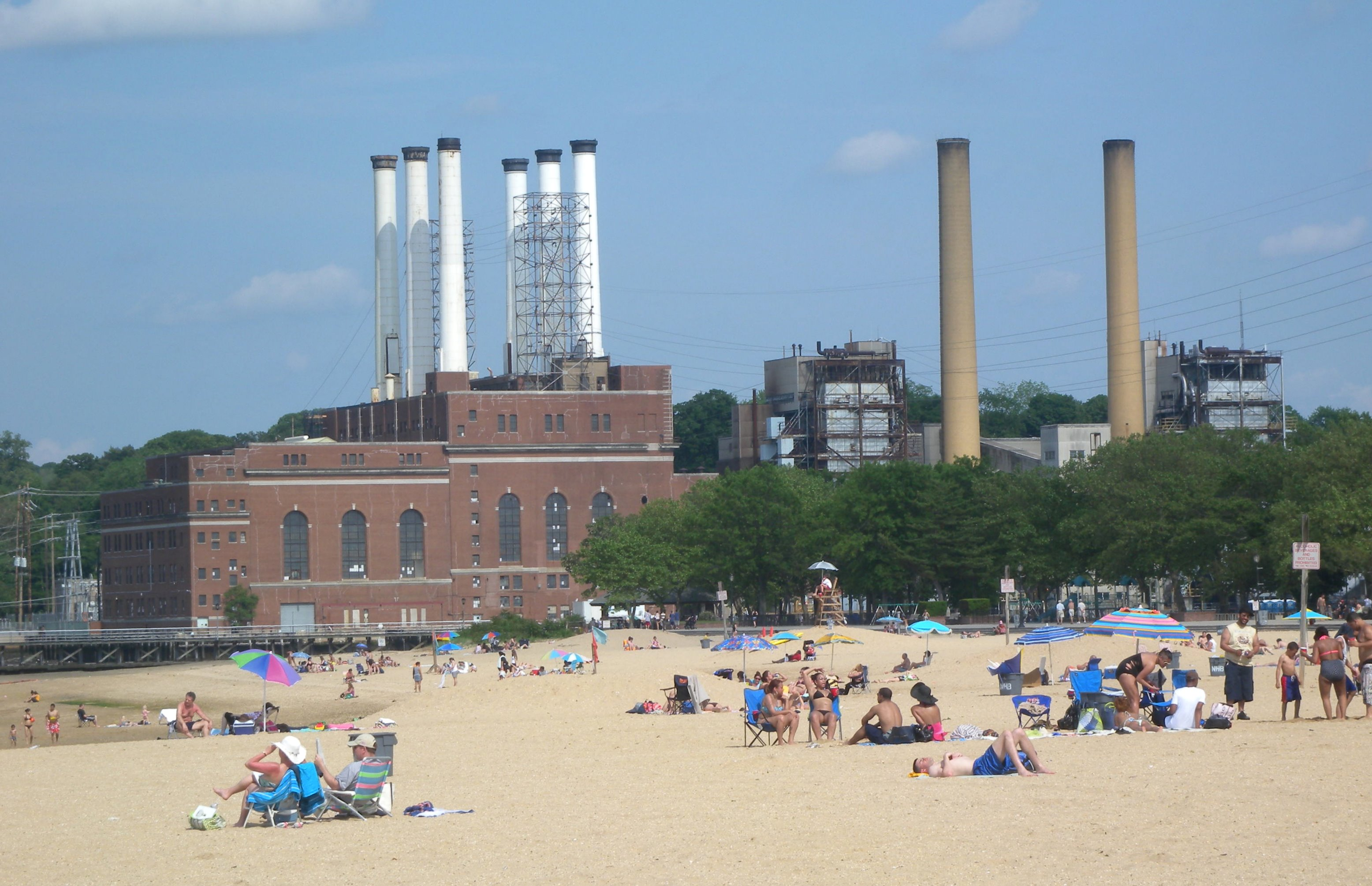
- Glenwood Generating Station in 2011, viewed from Bar Beach across Hempstead Harbor. The brick building at left is Station 2, while the two yellow smokestacks at right are part of Station 3. Both buildings were demolished by 2015.
- Country: United States
- Location: Glenwood Landing, Long Island, New York
- Coordinates: 40°49′39″N 73°38′51″W
- Status: In service

Power generation
- Nameplate capacity: 232 MW

External links
- Commons: Related media on Commons

Glenwood Generating Station is a power station in Glenwood Landing, New York owned by National Grid USA. It is mainly known for being the former site of an architecturally significant 1920s brick power station. That building and an adjacent 1950s station were demolished over the course of 2013 to 2015, due to their obsolescence as well as the excessive cost of safely retaining the building given its poor condition. Four smaller gas turbine peaking generators remain in operation, as does the Y-50 Cable connection across Long Island Sound.

== Architecture ==
Station 2 was constructed in the 1920s and was considered significant as an example of early 20th-century industrial architecture. It was designed in an industrial Beaux-Arts style, with large arched windows and stringcourse intended to prevent it from becoming an eyesore given its proximity to affluent communities. It was constructed with Flemish bond brickwork and decorative limestone elements. It was also constructed to minimize noise and ash pollution. Buildings with such architectural detail were usually found in urban areas, making the Glenwood plant unusual for being far from urban areas at the time of its construction.

The building was divided into three sections: a narrow four-story administration section to the north containing offices; a five-story turbine room containing a large open space with decorated glazed buff brick walls; and a six-story boiler house mainly filled with equipment, topped by six 140-foot smoke stacks (ultimately reaching 265 feet above the floor slab). At the time of its demolition the New York State Office of Parks, Recreation and Historic Preservation determined that it appeared to meet the criteria for listing on the National Register of Historic Places, triggering an alternative use analysis. Given the building's poor condition after three decades of disuse, the excessive cost of making the building structurally sound prevented any plans to retain or renovate it.

== History ==
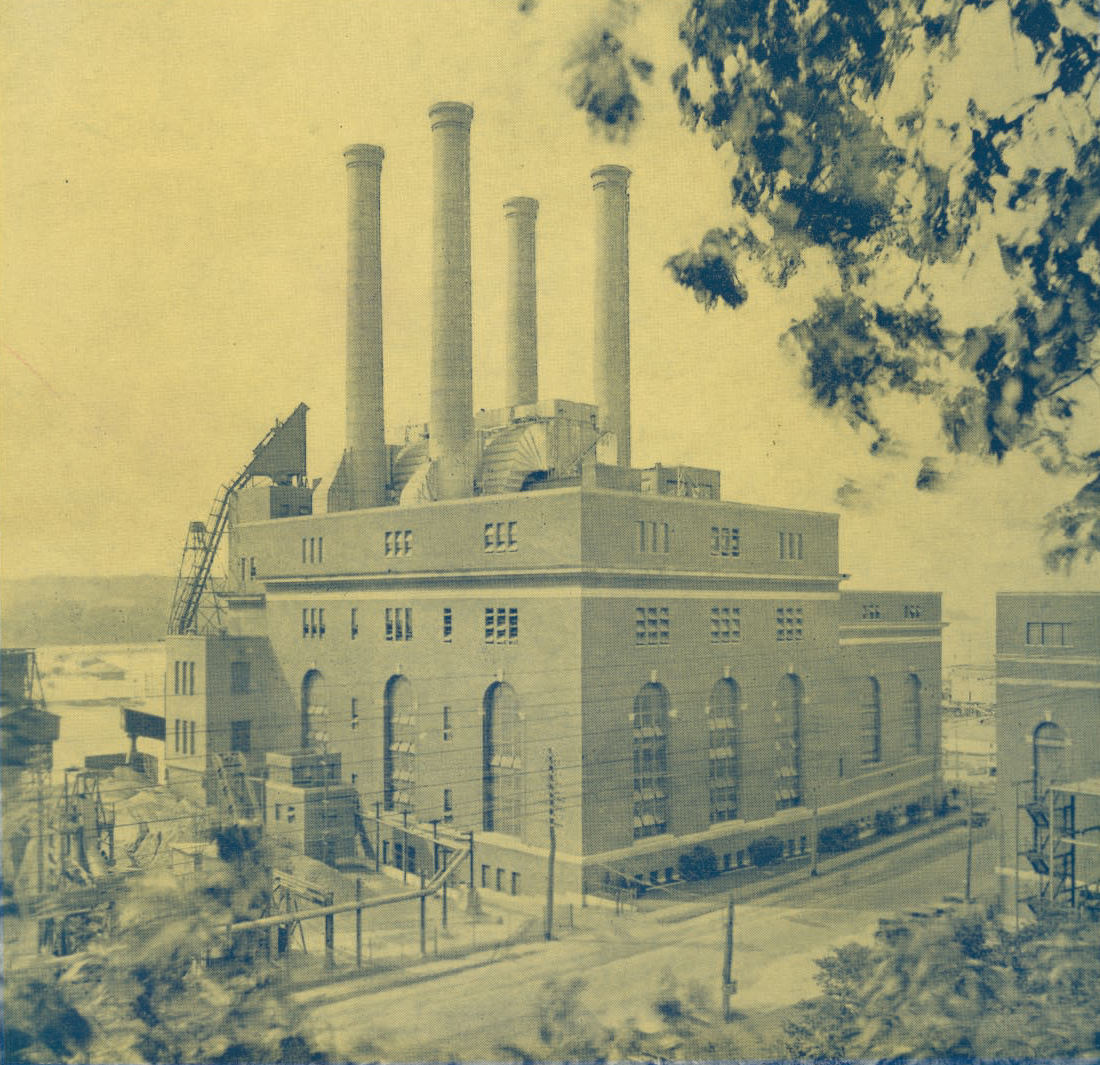
Glenwood Generating Station in 1936

=== Construction and early history ===
The first facility on the site was Station 1, constructed in 1906 and expanded during World War I, which existed until at least 1939. The Station 2 building was constructed from 1928 to 1931 by the Nassau Power and Light Company – a predecessor of the Long Island Lighting Company (LILCO) and the successor to the Roslyn Light and Power Company, which opened its first plant in Roslyn Heights in about 1900. The extra generating capacity was needed due to a sixfold increase in Long Island's electricity demand from 1910 to 1925. The expansion also reflected LILCO's then-novel philosophy of using few centralized power plants interconnected by transmission lines, rather than many small plants distributed through the region. In 1936 it was described as "the key electric generating plant of the Long Island system," and its control room managed LILCO's entire system. In 1939 it was upgraded to burn both coal and oil, and in 1946 natural gas capability was added.

In 1942, a 3-hour power outage caused by testing of new distribution circuits affected seven major factories producing material for World War II. These included the Grumman plant in Bethpage and the Republic Aviation plant in Farmingdale, where workers staged an impromptu baseball game while they waited for power to return. Local hospitals and Mitchel Field were able to continue operating under auxiliary power. Although sabotage was not suspected, it caused the colonel in charge of civilian protection for Nassau County to request that the Army guard the power station.

The two units of Station 3 became operational in 1952 and 1954. At the time The New York Times called it "one of the most modern power plants in the country," with both mechanical and electrostatic precipitators for dust and ash collection, as well as valve silencers and noise barriers. It was the first turbine generator mounted on an open deck in the Northeastern United States. Two similar units were constructed about the same time on the South Shore in the new Far Rockaway Power Station and E. F. Barrett Power Station.

In 1967, a 15 MW GE Frame 5 gas turbine generator was constructed for black start, peaking, and emergency purposes.

In 1972, the Town of Oyster Bay board unanimously denied LILCO a permit to further expand the plant with five 50 MW gas turbines, citing air-quality concerns and the effects of the 1970s energy crisis. Town Supervisor John W. Burke at the time noted the board's recognition that "in view of the fuel shortage, construction of gas turbines just seems out of step with the direction being taken by the average consumer, who lowers his thermostat and wears a sweater in his home to reduce the amount of fuel burning." Nevertheless, two GE Frame 7B gas turbine generators were constructed that year.

In 1978, the Y-50 Cable was constructed between Westchester County's Dunwoodie North Substation and the Glenwood Generating Station, via the Long Island Sound.

=== Continued operation ===
The Station 2 generating units were taken out of operation in 1978, but as late as 2009 the building was used for such purposes as a waste water treatment facility for the adjacent operational units, office and warehouse space, and transmission and fiber optic lines.

In 1998, as part of a state-brokered deal, LILCO's power generation facilities, including the Glenwood plant, were absorbed into KeySpan Energy, with the public Long Island Power Authority (LIPA) taking over transmission and delivery functions. KeySpan would be acquired by National Grid in 2007.

In 2001, LIPA proposed building two mini-turbines at Glenwood Landing as part of a plan to build ten such plants across Long Island to avoid the risk of rolling blackouts in the face of increased demand like those experienced in California the previous year, given strain on the system from a heat wave in 2001. The pair of turbines produced 79 MW, just under an 80 MW threshold that would have triggered a full regulatory and environmental review. The new turbines were completed by May 2002, and were the first of the ten to enter operation.

Station 3's utilization decreased from 43 percent in 2001 to 11.2 percent in 2005. As of 2009, the power station was used as a peaking power plant operating in the summer, with two operational natural gas steam-electric generating units with a combined 210 MW capacity. It had a once-through water cooling system using water from the adjacent Hempstead Harbor. By 2014 the Station 2 building had deteriorated to the point where it was nearing condemnation.

=== Demolition of steam plants ===
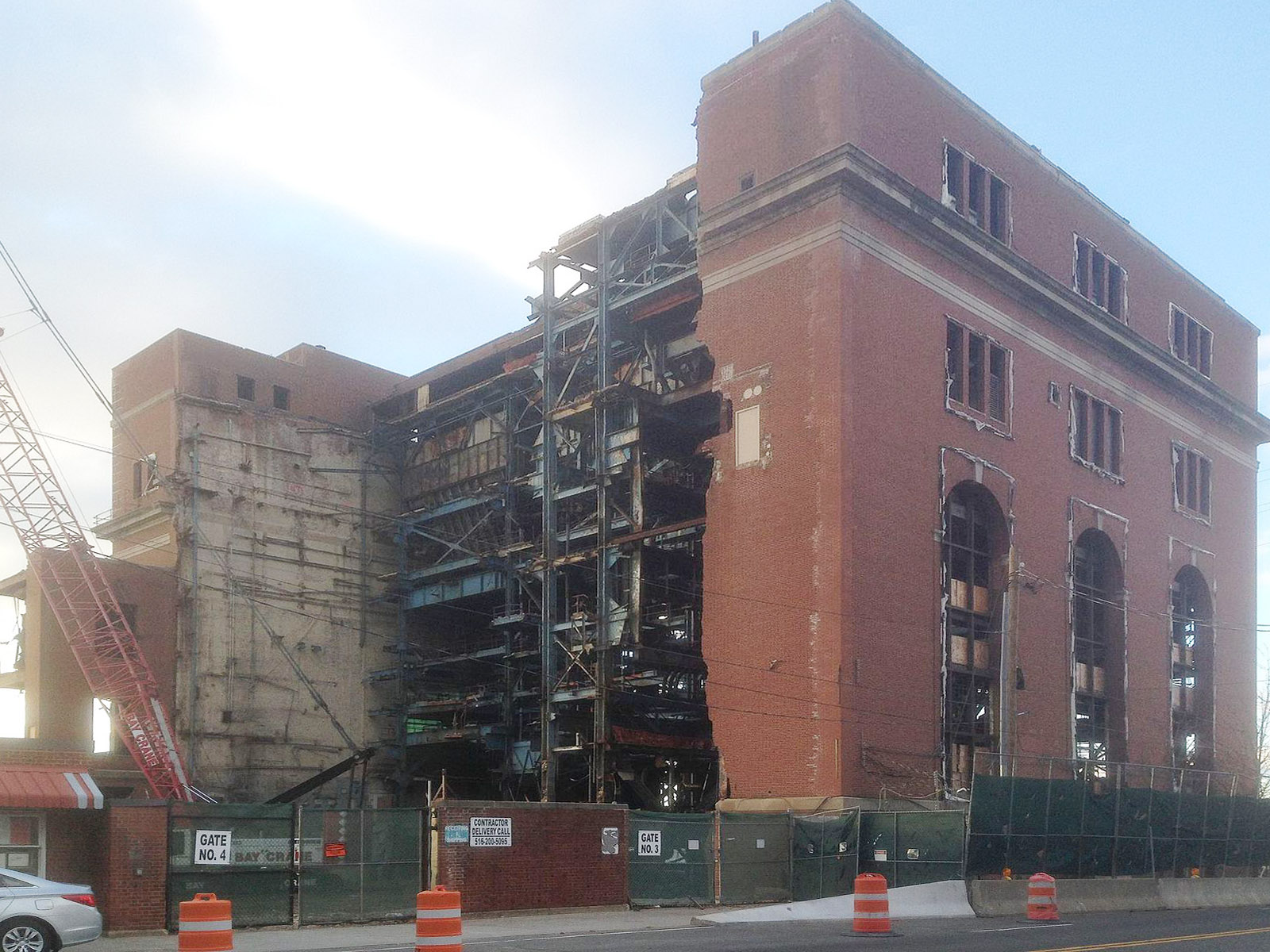
Station 2 being demolished in November 2014

In 2011 it was announced that the Glenwood Landing station would be shut down and demolished along with its sister plant in Far Rockaway. The two stations were described as the oldest and least efficient of the power plants on Long Island, with the closures saving $76 million through 2015.

Local resident Karin Barnaby campaigned to renovate Station 2 for commercial and cultural uses rather than demolish it, pointing to other redeveloped historic power plants in the United States such as the Pratt Street Power Plant in Baltimore and the Homan Square Power House in Chicago. Despite collecting 780 signatures for a petition, this was rejected due to the excessive cost of renovating the building given its poor condition. Demolition was estimated to cost $8 million, as opposed to $31 million to make the building structurally sound without improving it, and $100 million to renovate it into a mixed-use development including an exhibition hall in the old turbine room. Using the building for new power generation capacity was deemed unfeasible because modern generation equipment was incompatible with the building design.

Demolition of the plant raised concern about the financial effects on the local North Shore School District, as the over $20 million annual tax payments from the plant provided 20 percent of the district's budget. This led to fears of a 15–19% increase in residential taxes in late 2014. However, it was determined that according to state law there could be no more than a 1% increase in property taxes for a given tax class as a result of a decreased tax assessment in another class (the four tax classes being residential, cooperatives/condominiums, commercial, and utilities). The financial effects on the district would thus have to be mitigated by increased taxes on remaining utilities in the district, as well as a $2.5 million one-time grant from the state arranged by local state legislators. The site's municipal and school payments in lieu of taxes fell from $23.2 million in 2012 to $16.6 million in 2015.

Station 3 was demolished in November 2013, and demolition of Station 2 was completed in 2015. National Grid opted for a controlled deconstruction rather than an implosion or using a wrecking ball. The demolition of Station 2 required the relocation of a peregrine falcon nest from the top of one of the smoke stacks. After demolition and land remediation had been completed, the area was planned to be paved over with asphalt and offered to developers.

=== Later history ===
The three smaller gas-turbine peaking generators built by LILCO in 1967 and 1972 remained in operation, as did the two constructed in 2002. In addition, three electrical substations, three fuel tanks, and a water tower elsewhere on the site remained in operation.

In 2017, National Grid proposed raising the legal power output limit of the two 2002 peaking plants from 79.9 MW to 94 megawatts. In 2020, the 15 MW generator from 1967 was shuttered, leaving four more operational, and the two 1972 generators had water injection systems installed, to comply with stricter air emissions regulations. As of 2020, Glenwood Generating Station's remaining 232 MW nameplate capacity made it the eighth largest power generation facility on Long Island. That year it generated 107.7 GWh, which placed twelfth.

== See also ==
- List of power stations in New York
- New York energy law
- Northport Power Station – Fuel oil and natural gas power plant in Northport, New York
