= 2016 United States election leaks =

Leaks during the 2016 U.S. elections

- Part of Russian interference in the 2016 United States elections
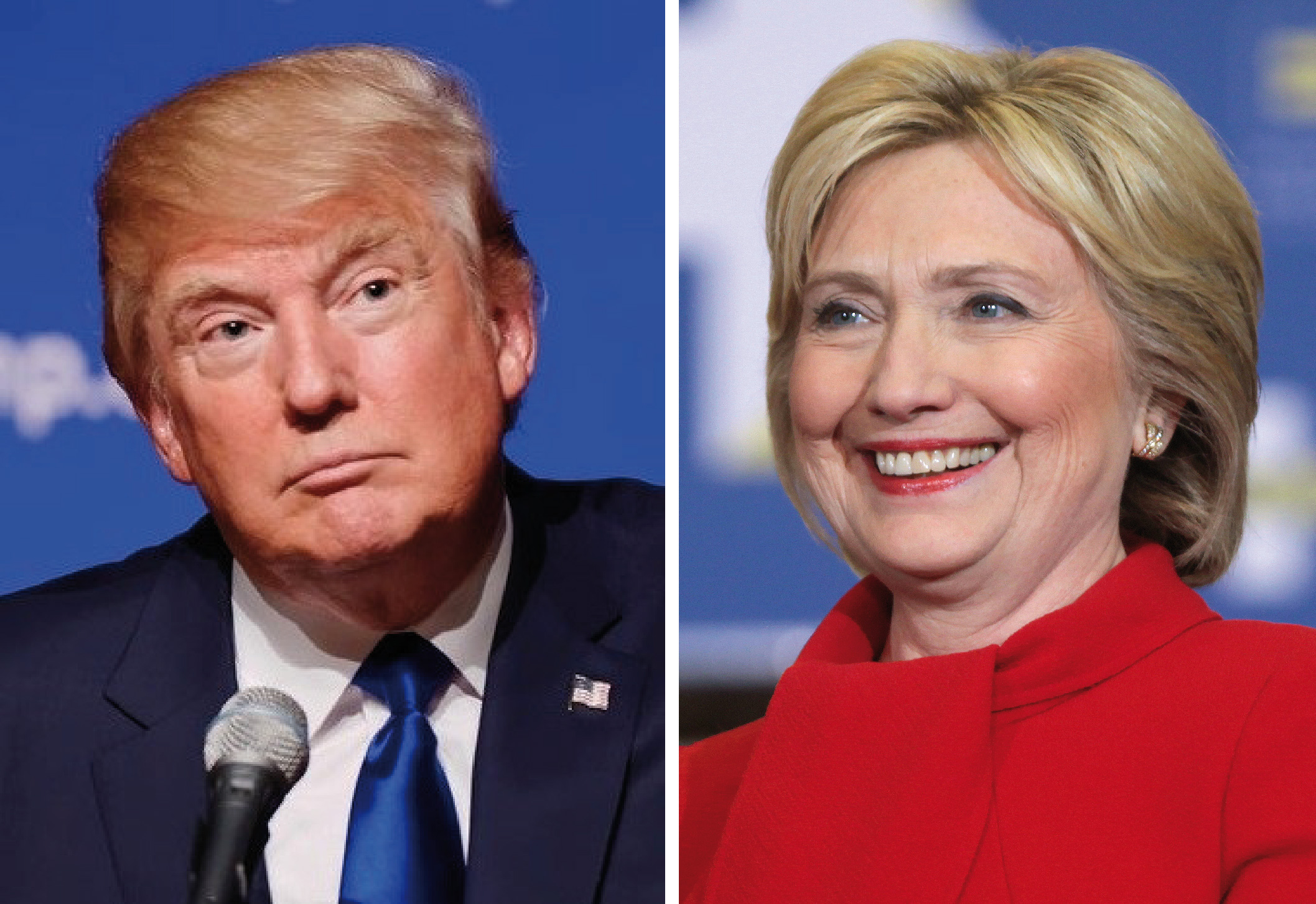
- Donald Trump (left) and Hillary Clinton (right)
- Date: July 13, 2016 (first acknowledgement)
- Also known as: 2016 Democratic National Committee email leak
- Type: Cybercrime
- Cause: Computer hacking
- Motive: Election interference
- Target: DNC servers
- Perpetrators: Guccifer 2.0, DCLeaks and WikiLeaks
- First reporter: Vice; The Washington Post
- Accused: Russian GRU

The 2016 United States election leaks were a series of publications of more than 150,000 stolen emails and other files during the U.S. presidential election campaigns released by Guccifer 2.0, DCLeaks and WikiLeaks. Computer hackers allegedly affiliated with the Russian military intelligence service (GRU) infiltrated information systems of the Democratic National Committee (DNC), the Democratic Congressional Campaign Committee (DCCC), and Clinton campaign officials, notably chairman John Podesta, and leaked some of the stolen materials. Emails from Guccifer 2.0 to journalists suggest a link to DCLeaks, and messages WikiLeaks exchanged with Guccifer 2.0 and DCLeaks suggest both submitted emails to WikiLeaks.

Guccifer 2.0 released Democrats' files related to their House of Representatives candidates in Florida, Pennsylvania, New Hampshire, Ohio, Illinois, New Mexico and North Carolina, and documents stolen from John Podesta's mailbox and House Minority Leader Nancy Pelosi's hacked personal computer. Guccifer 2.0 also gave reporters a password to access private files on DCLeaks and released information about Republican donors and opposition research about Sarah Palin and Donald Trump. DCLeaks released emails from Republican targets including the 2016 campaign staff of Arizona Senator John McCain, and South Carolina Senator Lindsey Graham. DCLeaks also released information about more than 200 Democratic lawmakers, the emails of the former NATO supreme commander in Europe and files from the George Soros' Open Society Foundation.

The emails and documents leaked from the Democratic Party's national committee (DNC) resulted in allegations that the DNC was biased against Bernie Sanders' presidential campaign. The revelations prompted the resignation of DNC chair Debbie Wasserman Schultz before the 2016 Democratic National Convention. These releases caused significant harm to the Clinton campaign, and have been cited as a potential contributing factor to her surprise loss in the general election against Donald Trump. Podesta's emails shed light on the inner workings of the Clinton campaign and suggested that CNN commentator Donna Brazile had shared audience questions with the Clinton campaign in advance of town hall meetings. The emails also contained excerpts from three Clinton speeches to Goldman Sachs and an internal campaign document cataloging potentially problematic portions of over 50 paid speeches.

On July 13, 2018, the Mueller special counsel investigation issued an indictment against 12 Russian GRU military officers; it alleged that Guccifer 2.0 and DCLeaks were part of a Russian military operation to interfere in the 2016 U.S. presidential election. The indictment also alleged that the Russian operation provided the emails to WikiLeaks. Wikileaks said its source was not the Russian government or a state party and the Russian government said it had no involvement.

== Guccifer 2.0 ==
"Guccifer 2.0" is a persona which claimed to be the hacker(s) who gained unauthorized access to the Democratic National Committee (DNC) computer network and then leaked its documents to the media, the website WikiLeaks, and a conference event. Some of the documents "Guccifer 2.0" released to the media appear to be forgeries cobbled together from public information and previous hacks, which had been mixed with disinformation. The New York Times noted, "The seats that Guccifer 2.0 targeted in the document dumps were hardly random: They were some of the most competitive House races in the country."

The U.S. Intelligence Community and research firms concluded that some of the genuine leaks from "Guccifer 2.0" were part of a series of cyberattacks on the DNC committed by two Russian military intelligence groups, and that "Guccifer 2.0" is actually a persona created by Russian intelligence services to cover for their interference in the 2016 U.S. presidential election. The Russian government denies involvement in the theft, and "Guccifer 2.0" denied links to Russia. On June 21, 2016, in an interview with Vice, "Guccifer 2.0" said he is Romanian. When pressed to use the Romanian language in an interview with Motherboard via online chat, "he used such clunky grammar and terminology that experts believed he was using an online translator." Linguistic analysis by Shlomo Engelson Argamon showed that Guccifer 2.0 is most likely "a Russian pretending to be a Romanian". WikiLeaks founder Julian Assange said Guccifer 2.0's leaks "look very much like they’re from the Russians. But in some ways, they look very amateur, and almost look too much like the Russians."

On June 14, 2016, according to The Washington Post, the DNC acknowledged a hack that was attributed to Russia and claimed by Guccifer 2.0 who released several hacked documents, including one from Podesta's mailbox, the next day.

In mid-July 13, 2016, Guccifer 2.0 released over 10,000 names from the DNC in two spreadsheets and a list of objectionable quotes from Sarah Palin. A few days later, Guccifer 2.0 gave The Hill exclusive access to numerous documents and files covering political strategies, including correlating the banks that received bailout funds with Republican Party and Democratic Party donations.

On July 22, 2016, the DNC emails were published by WikiLeaks and Guccifer 2.0 tweeted that he was the hacker and WikiLeaks' source.

On August 15, 2016, a candidate for Congress allegedly contacted Guccifer 2.0 to request information on the candidate's opponent. Guccifer 2.0 responded with the requested stolen information. A week later, Florida GOP campaign advisor Aaron Nevins contacted Guccifer 2.0 and asked for material. Nevins set up a Dropbox account and Guccifer 2.0 transferred 2.5 gigabytes of data to it. Nevins analyzed the data and posted the results on his blog, HelloFLA.com, and sends Guccifer 2.0 a link. Guccifer 2.0 forwarded the link to Roger Stone.

On September 13, 2016, during a conference, a confirmed and remote representative of Guccifer 2.0 released almost 700 megabytes (MB) worth of documents from the DNC, which included personal and work email addresses and phone numbers for top Obama White House officials . According to British journalist Duncan Campbell, the Russian intelligence agency, GRU, tried to implicate Seth Rich as the source of the stolen DNC files in order to draw attention away from themselves. Datestamps on the DNC files released on September 13 were altered to show the data had been obtained on July 5, 2016, five days before Rich's death, and the time zone was changed to Eastern Time, within which Washington, D.C., falls. Based partly on their acceptance of the false dates, some experts then concluded that the emails had been copied in the DNC offices, and had not been hacked from outside.

On October 4, 2016, Guccifer 2.0 released documents and claimed that they were taken from the Clinton Foundation and showed "corruption and malfeasance" there. Security experts quickly determined that the release was a hoax; the release did not contain Clinton Foundation documents, but rather consisted of documents previously released from the DNC and DCCC thefts, data aggregated from public records, and documents that were fabricated altogether as propaganda. Singled out as particularly unrealistic was the idea that Clinton's team would have actually named a file "Pay for Play" on their own server, as Guccifer 2.0's screenshots of the alleged "hack" show.

== DCLeaks ==
DCLeaks (also known as DC Leaks) was a website that was established in June 2016. It was responsible for publishing leaks of emails belonging to multiple prominent figures in the United States government and military. Cybersecurity research firms determined the site was a front for the Russian cyber-espionage group Fancy Bear. On July 13, 2018, an indictment was made against 12 Russian GRU military officers; it alleged that DCLeaks was part of a Russian military operation to interfere in the 2016 U.S. presidential election.

According to the DCLeaks site's "About" page, their aim was "to find out and tell you the truth about U.S. decision-making process [sic] as well as about the key elements of American political life." They said they were "the American hacktivists who respect and appreciate freedom of speech, human rights and government of the people."

In late June 2016, Guccifer 2.0 gave reporters a password to access emails stolen from Democrats on the DCLeaks website.

On July 1, 2016, DCLeaks released the emails of four-star General Philip Breedlove, the former NATO supreme commander in Europe. The emails allegedly show that Breedlove sought to overcome President Barack Obama's reluctance to escalate military tensions with Russia over the Russo-Ukrainian War in 2014.

On August 12, 2016, DCLeaks released roughly 300 emails from Republican targets, including the 2016 campaign staff of Arizona Senator John McCain, South Carolina Senator Lindsey Graham, and 2012 presidential candidate and former Minnesota Representative Michele Bachmann. The release included 18 emails from the Illinois Republican Party. On the same day, DCLeaks released information about more than 200 Democratic lawmakers, including their personal cellphone numbers. The numerous crank calls that Hillary Clinton received from this disclosure along with the loss of her campaign's email security caused a very severe disruption of her campaign.

On August 15, 2016, DCLeaks released 2,576 files predominately related to George Soros' Open Society Foundation. The leak included the Foundation's internal work plans, strategies, priorities and other worldwide activities by Soros and showed the Foundation's support for Palestinian and pro-BDS causes, including Adalah.

On September 15, 2016, DCLeaks contacted WikiLeaks about a submission. The Mueller Report concluded the Podesta Emails were probably staged for transfer to WikiLeaks on September 19, 2016.

== DNC Email Leak ==
The 2016 Democratic National Committee email leak is a collection of Democratic National Committee (DNC) emails stolen by one or more hackers operating under the pseudonym "Guccifer 2.0" who are alleged to be Russian intelligence agency hackers, according to indictments carried out by the Mueller investigation. The DNC emails were published by WikiLeaks on July 22, 2016, just before the 2016 Democratic National Convention. Julian Assange said he had originally meant to release the emails on July 18, but WikiLeaks "had these hiccups that delayed us, and we were given a little more time." It wasn't clear who had given him time, and Assange argued that the recording was faulty.

The first batch included 19,252 emails and 8,034 attachments from the DNC, the governing body of the United States' Democratic Party. The leak includes emails from seven key DNC staff members, and date from January 2015 to May 2016. On November 6, 2016, WikiLeaks released a second batch of DNC emails, adding 8,263 emails to its collection.

The leaks resulted in allegations of bias against Bernie Sanders' presidential campaign, in apparent contradiction with the DNC leadership's publicly stated neutrality, as several DNC operatives openly derided Sanders' campaign and discussed ways to advance Hillary Clinton's nomination. Later revelations included controversial DNC–Clinton agreements dated before the primary, regarding financial arrangements and control over policy and hiring decisions. The revelations prompted the resignation of DNC chair Debbie Wasserman Schultz before the 2016 Democratic National Convention. The DNC issued a formal apology to Bernie Sanders and his supporters "for the inexcusable remarks made over email" that did not reflect the DNC's "steadfast commitment to neutrality during the nominating process." After the convention, DNC CEO Amy Dacey, CFO Brad Marshall, and Communications Director Luis Miranda also resigned in the wake of the controversy.

=== Guccifer 2.0 submission to WikiLeaks ===
A week after Guccifer 2.0 appeared online, WikiLeaks sent the persona a message saying to "send any new material here for us to review and it will have a much higher impact than what you are doing." After not receiving a reply, on July 26, 2016 WikiLeaks sent another message that said "if you have anything hillary related we want it in the next tweo [sic] days prefable [sic] because the DNC is approaching and she will solidify bernie supporters behind her after." Guccifer 2.0 responded "ok ... i see," and WikiLeaks added "we think trump has only a 25% chance of winning against hillary ... so conflict between bernie and hillary is interesting." On July 14, 2016 Guccifer 2.0 sent WikiLeaks an email with an encrypted attachment labeled "wk dnc link1.txt.gpg." According to the indictment, the email explained that "the encrypted file contained instructions on how to access an online archive of stolen DNC documents."

Four days later, WikiLeaks responded that it had received "the 1Gb or so archive" and would release the files that week. The DNC emails were released several days later.

=== Contents ===
The emails leaked by Wikileaks revealed information about the DNC's interactions with the media, Hillary Clinton's and Bernie Sanders' campaigns, and financial contributions. It also includes personal information about the donors of the Democratic Party, including credit card and Social Security numbers, which could facilitate identity theft.

==== Media ====
The emails include DNC staff's "off-the-record" correspondence with media personalities, including the reporters at CNN, Politico, The Wall Street Journal, and The Washington Post.

==== Bernie Sanders' campaign ====
In the emails, DNC staffers derided the Sanders campaign. The Washington Post reported: "Many of the most damaging emails suggest the committee was actively trying to undermine Bernie Sanders's presidential campaign."

In a May 2016 email chain, the DNC chief financial officer (CFO) Brad Marshall told the DNC chief executive officer, Amy Dacey, that they should have someone from the media ask Sanders if he is an atheist prior to the West Virginia primary.

On May 21, 2016, DNC National Press Secretary Mark Paustenbach sent an email to DNC Spokesman Luis Miranda mentioning a controversy that ensued in December 2015, when the National Data Director of the Sanders campaign and three subordinate staffers accessed the Clinton campaign's voter information on the NGP VAN database. (The party accused Sanders' campaign of impropriety and briefly limited its access to the database. The Sanders campaign filed suit for breach of contract against the DNC, but dropped the suit on April 29, 2016.) Paustenbach suggested that the incident could be used to promote a "narrative for a story, which is that Bernie never had his act together, that his campaign was a mess." The DNC rejected this suggestion. The Washington Post wrote: "Paustenbach's suggestion, in that way, could be read as a defense of the committee rather than pushing negative information about Sanders. But this is still the committee pushing negative information about one of its candidates."

==== Debbie Wasserman Schultz's emails ====
Following the Nevada Democratic convention, Debbie Wasserman Schultz wrote about Jeff Weaver, manager of Bernie Sanders' campaign: "Damn liar. Particularly scummy that he barely acknowledges the violent and threatening behavior that occurred". In another email, Wasserman Schultz said of Bernie Sanders, "He isn't going to be president." Other emails showed her stating that Sanders doesn't understand the Democratic Party.

In May 2016, MSNBC's Mika Brzezinski accused the DNC of bias against the Sanders campaign and called on Wasserman Schultz to step down. Wasserman Schultz was upset at the negative media coverage of her actions, and she emailed the political director of NBC News, Chuck Todd, that such coverage of her "must stop". Describing the coverage as the "LAST straw", she ordered the DNC's communications director to call MSNBC president Phil Griffin to demand an apology from Brzezinski.

==== Financial and donor information ====
According to The New York Times, the cache included "thousands of emails exchanged by Democratic officials and party fund-raisers, revealing in rarely seen detail the elaborate, ingratiating and often bluntly transactional exchanges necessary to harvest hundreds of millions of dollars from the party's wealthy donor class. The emails capture a world where seating charts are arranged with dollar totals in mind, where a White House celebration of gay pride is a thinly disguised occasion for rewarding wealthy donors and where physical proximity to the president is the most precious of currencies." As is common in national politics, large party donors "were the subject of entire dossiers, as fund-raisers tried to gauge their interests, annoyances and passions."

In a series of email exchanges in April and May 2016, DNC fundraising staff discussed and compiled a list of people (mainly donors) who might be appointed to federal boards and commissions. OpenSecrets senior fellow Bob Biersack noted that this is a longstanding practice in the United States: "Big donors have always risen to the top of lists for appointment to plum ambassadorships and other boards and commissions around the federal landscape." The White House denied that financial support for the party was connected to board appointments, saying: "Being a donor does not get you a role in this administration, nor does it preclude you from getting one. We've said this for many years now and there's nothing in the emails that have been released that contradicts that."

== Podesta Emails ==
In March 2016, the personal Gmail account of John Podesta, a former White House chief of staff and chair of Hillary Clinton's 2016 U.S. presidential campaign, was compromised via a spear-phishing attack, and some of his emails, many of which were work-related, were hacked. WikiLeaks published the Podesta Emails in October and November 2016. Analysis of the files and communications between WikiLeaks and DCLeaks has resulted in the Mueller Report and Thomas Rid suggesting that the Russian cyber spying group Fancy Bear used DCLeaks to pass the Podesta Emails to WikiLeaks.

Podesta's emails shed light on the inner workings of the Clinton campaign, suggested that CNN commentator Donna Brazile had shared audience questions with the Clinton campaign in advance of town hall meeting and contained excerpts from Hillary Clinton's speeches to Wall Street firms. Proponents of the extensively discredited Pizzagate conspiracy theory falsely claimed the emails contained coded messages which supported their conspiracy theory.

=== DCLeaks submission to WikiLeaks ===
On September 15, 2016 the DCLeaks Twitter account sent WikiLeaks a DM about a possible submission, saying they had gotten no response on the secured chat. The WikiLeaks account responded "Hi there" without further elaboration but did not receive a response. The same day, the Guccifer 2.0 Twitter account sent DCLeaks a DM saying that WikiLeaks was trying to contact them and to arrange to speak through encrypted email. Analysis of the metadata on the Podesta emails show a creation date of September 19, 2016. The Mueller Report concluded that this might have been when the emails were transferred to WikiLeaks.

=== Publication ===
On October 7, 2016, a few hours after the Obama Administration released a statement by the Department of Homeland Security and the director of National Intelligence accusing the Russian government of interfering in the election through hacking, and 30 minutes after The Washington Post reported on the Access Hollywood videotape, WikiLeaks began publishing thousands of emails from Podesta's Gmail account. The hacked documents effectively distracted media and voter attention from both stories. According to WikiLeaks journalist Stefania Maurizi, the release day had been set several days earlier. Throughout October, WikiLeaks released installments of the Podesta emails on a daily basis.

On October 17, 2016, the government of Ecuador severed the internet connection of WikiLeaks founder Julian Assange at the Ecuadorian embassy in London. The Ecuadorian government stated that it had temporarily severed Assange's internet connection because of WikiLeaks' release of documents "impacting on the U.S. election campaign", although it also stated this was not meant to prevent WikiLeaks from operating. WikiLeaks continued releasing installments of the Podesta emails during this time.

=== Contents ===
Some of the emails provide some insight into the inner workings of the Clinton campaign. For example, the emails show a discussion among campaign manager Robby Mook and top aides about possible campaign themes and slogans. Other emails revealed insights about the internal conflicts of the Clinton Foundation. Some were emails that Barack Obama and Podesta exchanged in 2008.

One of the emails released on October 12, 2016, included Podesta's iCloud account password. His iCloud account was hacked, and his Twitter account was then briefly compromised.

==== Clinton's Wall Street speeches ====
WikiLeaks published transcripts of three Clinton speeches to Goldman Sachs and an 80-page internal campaign document cataloging potentially problematic portions of over 50 paid speeches. Earlier in the campaign, WikiLeaks had offered a reward for copies of the speeches. During the Democratic primary campaign, Bernie Sanders had criticized Hillary Clinton for refusing to release transcripts of speeches given to financial firms, portraying her as too close to Wall Street.

In the October 2016 presidential debate, Clinton voiced her support for a "no-fly" zone in Syria. In a 2013 speech, Clinton had discussed the difficulties involved. In particular, she noted that in order to establish a no-fly zone, Syria's air defenses would need to be destroyed. Because the Assad government had located these anti-aircraft batteries in populated civilian areas, their destruction would cause many collateral civilian deaths. Clinton's staff additionally flagged comments about regulation of Wall Street, as well as her relationship with the industry, as potentially problematic.

The excerpts came up in the two subsequent presidential debates between Clinton and Trump. In one of the debates, the moderator Martha Raddatz quoted an excerpt saying that politicians "need both a public and a private position" and asked Clinton if it was okay for politicians to be "two-faced". Clinton replied, "As I recall, that was something I said about Abraham Lincoln after having seen the wonderful Steven Spielberg movie called Lincoln. It was a master class watching president Lincoln get the Congress to approve the 13th amendment, it was principled and strategic. I was making the point that it is hard sometimes to get the Congress to do what you want to do." In the third presidential debate, the moderator Chris Wallace quoted a speech excerpt where Clinton says, "My dream is a hemispheric common market with open trade and open borders," and asked if she was for open borders. Clinton replied, "If you went on to read the rest of the sentence, I was talking about energy. We trade more energy with our neighbors than we trade with the rest of the world combined. And I do want us to have an electric grid, an energy system that crosses borders."

==== Discussions of Catholic religious activities ====
Sandy Newman wrote to Podesta: "I have not thought at all about how one would 'plant the seeds of the revolution', or who would plant them." Podesta agreed that this was necessary to do as Newman suggested and wrote back to note that they had created groups like Catholics in Alliance for the Common Good and Catholics United to push for a more progressive approach to the faith, change would "have to be bottom up".

Raymond Arroyo responded: "It makes it seem like you're creating organizations to change the core beliefs of the church," he said. "For someone to come and say, 'I have a political organization to change your church to complete my political agenda or advance my agenda', I don't know how anybody could embrace that." Professor Robert P. George added that "these groups are political operations constructed to masquerade as organizations devoted to the Catholic faith".

The leak revealed an email sent by John Halpin, a senior fellow at the Center for American Progress. The email discussed conservative media mogul Rupert Murdoch's decision to raise his kids in the Catholic Church. He wrote, "Many of the most powerful elements of the conservative movement are all Catholic (many converts) ... It's an amazing bastardization of the faith. They must be attracted to the systematic thought and severely backwards gender relations and must be totally unaware of Christian democracy." Palmieri responded: "I imagine they think it is the most socially acceptable, politically conservative religion—their rich friends wouldn't understand if they became evangelical." Supporters and members of Donald Trump's campaign called the email exchange evidence of anti-Catholic sentiment in the Democratic Party. Halpin confirmed that he had written the email, though he contested claims that it was "anti-Catholic" and said that it was taken out of context and that he had sent the email to his Catholic colleagues "to make a fleeting point about perceived hypocrisy and the flaunting of one's faith by prominent conservative leaders."

==== Presidential debate questions shared by Donna Brazile ====
On October 11, 2016, WikiLeaks released the text of an email sent by Donna Brazile on March 12, 2016, to Clinton communications director Jennifer Palmieri with the subject header "From time to time I get questions in advance." The email included a question about the death penalty. The following day Clinton received a similar question from the Townhall host, Roland Martin. Brazile initially denied coordinating with the Clinton campaign, and a CNN spokesperson said "CNN did not share any questions with Donna Brazile, or anyone else for that matter, prior to the town hall" and that "we have never, ever given a town hall question to anyone beforehand". According to CNNMoney, the debate moderator Roland Martin did not deny that he shared questions with Brazile. In another leaked email, Brazile wrote: "One of the questions directed to HRC tomorrow is from a woman with a rash. Her family has lead poison and she will ask what, if anything, will Hillary do as president to help the ppl of Flint." At a debate in Flint the following day, a woman whose "son had developed a rash from the contaminated water" asked Clinton: "If elected president, what course will you take to regain my trust in government?" In a third email, Brazile added: "I'll send a few more."

CNN severed ties with Brazile on October 14, 2016. Brazile later said that CNN did not give her "the ability to defend myself" after the email release and referred to WikiLeaks as "WikiLies". Brazile repeatedly denied that she had received the question on the death penalty in advance and has said that the documents released by WikiLeaks were "altered". In an essay for Time written on March 17, 2017, Brazile wrote that the emails revealed that "among the many things I did in my role as a Democratic operative and D.N.C. Vice Chair [...] was to share potential town hall topics with the Clinton campaign." She wrote, "My job was to make all our Democratic candidates look good, and I worked closely with both campaigns to make that happen. But sending those emails was a mistake I will forever regret."

==== Saudi Arabia and Qatar ====
One leaked email from August 2014, addressed to Podesta, identifies Saudi Arabia and Qatar as providing "clandestine", "financial and logistic" aid to ISIS and other "radical Sunni groups". The email outlines a plan of action against ISIS, urges putting pressure on Saudi Arabia and Qatar to end their alleged support for the group. Its unclear who originally wrote the email.

== Investigations ==
=== Cybersecurity analysis ===
Cybersecurity experts and firms, including CrowdStrike, Fidelis Cybersecurity, Mandiant, SecureWorks, and ThreatConnect, and the editor for Ars Technica, stated the leak was part of a series of cyberattacks on the DNC committed by two Russian intelligence groups. U.S. intelligence agencies also stated with "high confidence" that the Russian government was behind the theft of emails and documents from the DNC, according to reports in The New York Times and The Washington Post.

WikiLeaks founder Julian Assange initially stuck to WikiLeaks policy of neither confirming or denying sources but in January 2017 said that their "source is not the Russian government and it is not a state party", and the Russian government said it had no involvement.

Researchers from the Atlanta-based cybersecurity firm Dell SecureWorks reported that the emails had been obtained through a data theft carried out by the hacker group Fancy Bear, a group of Russian intelligence-linked hackers that were also responsible for cyberattacks that targeted the Democratic National Committee (DNC) and Democratic Congressional Campaign Committee (DCCC), resulting in WikiLeaks publishing emails from those hacks.

SecureWorks concluded Fancy Bear had sent Podesta an email on March 19, 2016, that had the appearance of a Google security alert, but actually contained a misleading link—a strategy known as spear-phishing. The link—which used the URL shortening service Bitly—brought Podesta to a fake log-in page where he entered his Gmail credentials. The email was initially sent to the IT department as it was suspected of being a fake but was described as "legitimate" in an e-mail sent by a department employee, who later said he meant to write "illegitimate".

SecureWorks had tracked the activities of Fancy Bear for more than a year before the cyberattack, and in June 2016, had reported the group made use of malicious Bitly links and fake Google login pages to trick targets into divulging their passwords. However, the hackers left some of their Bitly accounts public, allowing SecureWorks to trace many of their links to e-mail accounts targeted with spear-phishing attacks. Of this list of targeted accounts, more than one hundred were policy advisors to Clinton, or members of her presidential campaign, and by June, twenty staff members had clicked on the phishing links.

=== United States intelligence conclusions ===
ODNI declassified assessment of "Russian activities and intentions in recent U.S. elections"

On October 7, 2016, the United States Department of Homeland Security and the Office of the Director of National Intelligence stated that the US intelligence community was "confident" that the Russian government directed the breaches and the release of the obtained or allegedly obtained material in an attempt to "... interfere with the US election process."

The U.S. Intelligence Community tasked resources debating why Putin chose summer 2016 to escalate active measures influencing U.S. politics. Director of National Intelligence James R. Clapper said after the 2011–13 Russian protests, Putin's confidence in his viability as a politician was damaged, and Putin responded with the propaganda operation. Former CIA officer Patrick Skinner explained the goal was to spread uncertainty. Former Director of the Defense Intelligence Agency David Shedd said that "the release of emails just as the Democratic National Convention is getting underway this week has the hallmarks of a Russian active measures campaign."

On December 9, 2016, the CIA told U.S. legislators the U.S. Intelligence Community concluded Russia conducted operations during the 2016 U.S. election to assist Donald Trump in winning the presidency. Multiple U.S intelligence agencies concluded people with direct ties to the Kremlin gave WikiLeaks hacked emails from the DNC and additional sources such as John Podesta, campaign chairman for Hillary Clinton. The CIA said the foreign intelligence agents were Russian operatives previously known to the U.S. CIA officials told U.S. Senators it was "quite clear" Russia's intentions were to help Trump. Trump released a statement December 9, and disregarded the CIA conclusions.

During November 2017, the Associated Press revealed that the FBI had deviated from its policy and failed to notify almost all of the persons in the cross hairs of the Kremlin-backed Fancy Bear's attack of 312 prominent government and defense officials who had their emails posted on DCLeaks.

Throughout late 2017 into early 2018, numerous individuals gave testimonies to the House Permanent Select Committee on Intelligence (HPSCI) who were charged with carrying out an investigation into the series of cyberattacks. On January 10, 2017, FBI Director James Comey told the Senate Intelligence Committee that Russia succeeded in "collecting some information from Republican-affiliated targets but did not leak it to the public". In March 2017, FBI Director James Comey told the House Intelligence Committee that the Russians “didn't deal with WikiLeaks directly.” He later told the Senate, “The Russians interfered with our elections in the 2016 cycle,” he said. “They did it with purpose. They did it with sophistication, with overwhelming technical efforts, and it was an ‘active measures’ campaign driven from the top of that government.” The Former Director of National Intelligence James Clapper put the conclusion simply to Raffi Khatchadourian: “It was done by a cutout, which of course afforded Assange plausible deniability.”

=== Steele dossier allegations ===
The Steele dossier, a controversial and unfinished political opposition research report published in January 2017, included several allegations relating to the hacking and leaking of the emails. The individuals named have denied the allegations. Some allegations have been publicly confirmed. However the intelligence community and most experts have treated the dossier with caution due to its unverified allegations.

=== Authenticity ===
A declassified report by the CIA, FBI, and NSA noted that, "Moscow most likely chose WikiLeaks because of its self-proclaimed reputation for authenticity. Disclosures through WikiLeaks did not contain any evident forgeries."

Cybersecurity experts interviewed by PolitiFact believe that while most of the emails are probably unaltered, it is possible the hackers inserted some doctored or fabricated material into the collection. Cybersecurity expert Robert Graham described the contents of some of the emails as authentic by using the DomainKeys Identified Mail (DKIM) contained in these emails' signatures. However, not all of the emails have these keys in their signature, and thus could not be verified with this method.

== Reactions ==
On July 18, 2016, Dmitry Peskov, press secretary for Russian president Vladimir Putin, stated that the Russian government had no involvement in the DNC hacking incident. Peskov called it "paranoid" and "absurd", saying: "We are again seeing these maniacal attempts to exploit the Russian theme in the US election campaign." That position was later reiterated by the Russian Embassy in Washington, DC, which called the allegation "entirely unrealistic".

=== Reactions to DNC Email Leak ===
The leak fueled tensions going into the 2016 Democratic National Convention: although DNC operatives denied accusations of bias, Sanders operatives and multiple media commentators cited the leaks as clear evidence that the DNC had been favoring Clinton and undermining Sanders. Several media commentators have disputed the significance of the emails, arguing that the DNC's internal preference for Clinton was not historically unusual and was unlikely to have swayed the final outcome of the primary; whereas many of Sanders' supporters viewed the revelations as symptomatic of an entrenched, unethical political establishment.

On July 24, 2016, Sanders urged Wasserman Schultz to resign following the leak and stated that he was "disappointed" by the leak, but that he was "not shocked." Jeff Weaver, Bernie Sanders' campaign manager, called for greater accountability in the DNC, calling Wasserman Schultz "a figure of disunity" within the Democratic Party. Later the same day, Wasserman Schultz resigned from her position as DNC Chairman, effective as of the end of the nominating convention. On July 24, 2016, in an interview with NPR, former DNC Chair and current Governor of Virginia Terry McAuliffe said "... that the chair's job should be "to remain neutral." "I sat in that chair in 2004 trying to navigate all the different candidates we had. But if you had people in there who were trashing one of the candidates, I can tell you this, if I were still chairman they wouldn't be working there. I mean, that is just totally unacceptable behavior."

On July 25, 2016, Anthony Zurcher, North America reporter for the BBC, commented that "the revelation that those in the heart of the Democratic establishment sought to undermine the anti-establishment Sanders is roughly on a par with [Casablanca character] police Capt Renault's professed shock that gambling was taking place in the Casablanca club he was raiding, as a waiter hands him his winnings."

On July 27, 2016, The New York Times reported that Julian Assange, in an interview on British ITV on June 12, 2016, had "made it clear that he hoped to harm Hillary Clinton's chances of winning the presidency."

=== Reactions to Podesta Emails ===
Sociology professor Zeynep Tufekci criticized how WikiLeaks handled the release of these emails, writing, "Taking one campaign manager's email account and releasing it with zero curation in the last month of an election needs to be treated as what it is: political sabotage, not whistle-blowing." In an op-ed for The Intercept, James Risen criticized the media for its reporting on emails, arguing that the hacking of the emails was a more significant story than the content of the emails themselves. Thomas Frank, writing in an editorial column for The Guardian, argued that the emails gave an "unprecedented view into the workings of the elite, and how it looks after itself".

Glen Caplin, a spokesman for the Clinton campaign, said, "By dribbling these out every day WikiLeaks is proving they are nothing but a propaganda arm of the Kremlin with a political agenda doing [Vladimir] Putin's dirty work to help elect Donald Trump."

=== Other reactions ===
Following the publication of the stolen emails, NSA whistleblower Edward Snowden criticized WikiLeaks for its wholesale leakage of data, writing that "their hostility to even modest curation is a mistake." The Washington Post contrasted the difference between WikiLeaks' practices and Snowden's disclosure of information about NSA: while Snowden worked with journalists to vet documents (withholding some, where it would endanger national security), WikiLeaks' "more radical" approach involves the dumping of "massive, searchable caches online with few—if any—apparent efforts to remove sensitive personal information."

On July 25, 2016, Anne Applebaum, columnist for The Washington Post, wrote that:

... with the exception of a few people on Twitter and a handful of print journalists, most of those covering this story, especially on television, are not interested in the nature of the hackers, and they are not asking why the Russians apparently chose to pass the emails on to WikiLeaks at this particular moment, on the eve of the Democratic National Convention. They are focusing instead on the content of what were meant to be private emails ...

She went on to describe in detail other Russian destabilization campaigns in Eastern European countries.

On July 25, 2016, Thomas Rid, Professor in Security Studies at King's College, London, and non-resident fellow at the School for Advanced International Studies, Johns Hopkins University, in Washington, DC, summed up the evidence pointing to Russia being behind the hacking of the DNC files and the "Guccifer-branded leaking operation". He concludes that these actions successfully blunted the "DNC's ability to use its opposition research in surprise against Trump ..." He further writes that data exfiltration from political organizations is done by many countries and is considered to be a legitimate form of intelligence work. "But digitally exfiltrating and then publishing possibly manipulated documents disguised as freewheeling hacktivism is crossing a big red line and setting a dangerous precedent: an authoritarian country directly yet covertly trying to sabotage an American election."

Russian security expert and investigative journalist Andrei Soldatov said "It is almost impossible to know for sure whether or not Russia is behind a hack of the DNC's servers". According to him, one of the reasons Russia would try to sway the US presidential election is that the Russian government considers Clinton "a hater of Russia": "There is this mentality in Russia of being besieged; that it is always under attack from the United States ... They are trying to interfere in our internal affairs so why not try to do the same thing to them?"

The American public's interest in WikiLeaks in October roughly coincided with a tightening presidential race between Trump and Clinton. According to an analysis of opinion polling by Harry Enten of FiveThirtyEight, the release of the emails roughly matched Clinton's decline in the polls, though public perceptions of her trustworthiness remained stable in the polls. Enten concluded that WikiLeaks' activities were "among the factors that might have contributed to [Clinton's] loss."

Thomas Joscelyn, a senior fellow at Just Security, has described how Assange's "hatred of Clinton" and "WikiLeaks' collusion with Russian government hackers during the 2016 presidential campaign" may have cost Clinton the election. He wrote that "Assange made it his goal in 2016 to counter the 'American liberal press,' which he accused of supporting Clinton. He aimed to turn that same press against her. Ultimately, with Russia's help, Assange succeeded."

== Civil DNC lawsuit ==
On April 20, 2018, the Democratic National Committee filed a civil lawsuit in federal court in New York, accusing the Russian government, the Trump campaign, Wikileaks, and others of conspiracy to alter the course of the 2016 presidential election and asking for monetary damages and a declaration admitting guilt. A hearing on the defendants' motions to dismiss was scheduled for May 17, 2018. In July 2019, the suit was dismissed with prejudice. In his judgement, federal judge John Koeltl said that although he believed the Russian government was involved in the hacking, US federal law generally prohibited suits against foreign governments. The judge said the other defendants, "did not participate in any wrongdoing in obtaining the materials in the first place" and were therefore within the law in publishing the information. He also said that the DNC's argument was "entirely divorced from the facts" and even if the Russians had directly provided the hacked documents to the Trump team, it would not be criminal for the campaign to publish those documents, as long as they did not contribute to the hacking itself. Koeltl denied the defendants motion for sanctions, but dismissed the suit with prejudice, meaning it had a substantive legal defect and could not be refiled.

== See also ==
- Clinton plan intelligence conspiracy theory
- Democratic National Committee cyber attacks
- The Plot to Hack America
- Russian involvement in the 2016 United States presidential election
