= Urbahn =

Urbahn is a surname. Notable people with the surname include:

- Keith Urbahn, American speechwriter and PR executive
- Max O. Urbahn (died 1995), American architect
- Roger Urbahn (1934–1984), New Zealand rugby union player, cricketer, and sports journalist

== See also ==
- Urban (name)
