= Hacks: The Inside Story =

2017 book by Donna Brazile

- First edition
- Author: Donna Brazile
- Language: English
- Publisher: Hachette Books
- Publication date: 2017
- Publication place: United States
- Media type: Hardcover, audiobook
- ISBN: 978-0-316-47851-9 (hardcover)

Hacks: The Inside Story (full title: Hacks: The Inside Story of the Break-ins and Breakdowns That Put Donald Trump in the White House) is a 2017 book by Donna Brazile about her time as interim chairperson of the Democratic National Committee during Hillary Clinton's 2016 presidential campaign.

== Pre-publication ==
In July 2017, Hachette Books announced that it had acquired the rights to Brazile's forthcoming book, Hacks: The Inside Story of the Break-ins and Breakdowns That Put Donald Trump in the White House, published on November 7, 2017. Hachette said the book would be "equal parts campaign thriller, memoir, and roadmap for the future." Matt Latimer and Keith Urbahn, partners at the literary and creative agency Javelin, represented Brazile in negotiations with Hachette.

== Contents ==
The work is "a savage memoir of her experiences with Clinton's campaign, which she describes as mismanaged and lacking in passion."

In an excerpt of the book published in Politico magazine, Brazile wrote that she had found an "unethical agreement" between the Clinton campaign and the DNC which had allowed Clinton to exert control of the party long before she became its nominee. Later, in an interview on ABC's This Week on November 5, 2017, Brazile said that she had found no evidence of the Democratic primaries having been rigged in favor of Clinton.

Brazile writes that after Clinton fainted at a 9/11 memorial service on September 11, 2016, she gave serious consideration to replacing Clinton as the Democratic nominee, selecting Vice President Joe Biden in her place. Under the DNC charter, the party chair can declare a presidential nominee "disabled," triggering a complex replacement process that involves a meeting of the full DNC. In the interview on ABC, she explained that she "had a lot of other combinations. This is something you play out in your mind." On November 4, 2017, more than 100 former Clinton campaign staffers published an open letter saying they "do not recognize the campaign she portrays in the book." They said they were shocked to learn that Brazile had considered replacing Clinton on the ticket and dismayed that Brazile had seemingly bought into "false Russian-fueled propaganda" about Clinton's health.

The credibility of Brazile's allegations also came under scrutiny by The Washington Post. In September 2015, the newspaper had already reported about the fundraising agreement between Hillary and the DNC which Brazile disclosed and noted that Sanders supporters knew about it. It was also reported that Brazile knew about the agreement before she publicly disclosed its details.

== Reception ==
The book received attention in part for Brazile's claims that the Democratic National Committee acted in favor of Clinton's campaign during the Democratic primaries, to the detriment of Bernie Sanders and his campaign. Brazile also discusses Clinton's collapse in September 2016, and subsequent discussions about replacing her as the Democratic presidential nominee.

Brazile's statements were investigated by The Washington Post, which reported the fundraising agreement which Brazile alleged rigged the 2016 Presidential primaries for Clinton in September 2015 and how Sanders supporters knew about it and ridiculed it after details outside of fundraising were not yet disclosed to the public.
