= Donna Brazile =

American author, educator, political activist, and strategist (born 1959)

Chair of the Democratic National Committee
- Acting; July 28, 2016 – February 25, 2017
- Preceded by: Debbie Wasserman Schultz
- Succeeded by: Tom Perez
- Acting; April 5, 2011 – May 4, 2011
- Preceded by: Tim Kaine
- Succeeded by: Debbie Wasserman Schultz

Personal details
- Born: Donna Lease Brazile; December 15, 1959 (age 66) New Orleans, Louisiana, U.S.
- Party: Democratic
- Education: Louisiana State University (BA)
- Website: Official website

Donna Lease Brazile (/brəˈzɪl/ brə-ZIL; born December 15, 1959) is an American political strategist, campaign manager, and political analyst who served twice as acting Chair of the Democratic National Committee (DNC). She is currently an ABC News contributor, and was previously a Fox News contributor until her resignation in May 2021. Brazile was also previously a CNN contributor, but resigned in October 2016, after WikiLeaks revealed that she shared two debate questions with Hillary Clinton's campaign during the 2016 United States presidential election.

A member of the Democratic Party, Brazile was the first African-American woman to direct a major presidential campaign, acting as campaign manager for Al Gore in 2000. She has also worked on several presidential campaigns for Democratic candidates, including Jesse Jackson and Walter Mondale–Geraldine Ferraro in 1984, and for Dick Gephardt in the 1988 Democratic primary. She served as the acting chair of the Democratic National Committee in spring 2011, and again from July 2016 to February 2017.

== Early life ==
Brazile was born in New Orleans, Louisiana, the daughter of Jean Marie (Brown) and Lionel Joseph Brazile, the third of nine children. Her family's surname was "Braswell" several generations prior, descending from an English-born ancestor named Bracewell. Brazile became interested in politics at the age of nine when a local candidate for office promised to build a neighborhood playground. She participated in a TRIO Upward Bound program while in high school. Brazile earned a bachelor's degree in industrial psychology from Louisiana State University (LSU) in 1981, and was a fellow at the Institute of Politics at Harvard University's John F. Kennedy School of Government. After graduating from LSU, Brazile worked for several advocacy groups in Washington, D.C., and was reportedly instrumental in the successful campaign to make Martin Luther King Jr.'s birthday a federal holiday.

Brazile volunteered for the Jimmy Carter–Walter Mondale presidential campaign of 1976 as a teenager and for their 1980 presidential campaign while a student at LSU.

== Political strategist ==
Brazile has worked on several presidential campaigns for Democratic candidates, including Jesse Jackson in 1984, Walter Mondale–Geraldine Ferraro in 1984, and Dick Gephardt in the 1988 Democratic primary.

After Gephardt lost the primary in 1988, Brazile served as deputy field director of the Michael Dukakis general election campaign. On October 20, 1988, she made headlines by telling a group of reporters that George H. W. Bush needed to "fess up" about unsubstantiated rumors of an extramarital affair. Said Brazile, "The American people have every right to know if Barbara Bush will share that bed with him in the White House." The Dukakis campaign immediately disavowed her remarks and Dukakis fired her from his campaign staff shortly after the story broke. Four years later, the same issue, the relationship of George H. W. Bush and Jennifer Fitzgerald, would be briefly rehashed during the 1992 campaign against Bill Clinton, who had his own extramarital affair rumors.

In the 1990s, Brazile served as chief of staff and press secretary to Congressional Delegate Eleanor Holmes Norton of the District of Columbia, where she helped guide the District's budget and local legislation on Capitol Hill. She also served as an advisor for Bill Clinton's campaign for the presidency in 1992 and for re-election in 1996.

In 1999, Brazile was appointed deputy campaign manager and was later promoted to campaign manager of the 2000 presidential campaign of Vice-President Al Gore, becoming the first African-American woman to manage a major party presidential campaign.

After the Hurricane Katrina disaster, Brazile was appointed as a member of the board of directors of the Louisiana Recovery Authority by Kathleen Blanco from 2005 to 2009. Brazile donated her papers to the Louisiana and Lower Mississippi Valley Collections in the Louisiana State University Libraries Special Collections, located in Hill Memorial Library.

== Democratic National Committee service ==
After the post-election fight over votes in the 2000 United States presidential election in Florida, Brazile was appointed chair of the Democratic National Committee's Voting Rights Institute.

=== 2008 presidential election ===
In the 2008 election, she served as a superdelegate for her work for Bill Clinton and Al Gore.

As a delegate for the Democratic National Convention, Brazile consistently refrained from declaring her preferred Democratic presidential candidate. In an interview with political satirist Stephen Colbert, Brazile stated, "Look, I'm a woman, so I like Hillary. I'm black; I like Obama. But I'm also grumpy, so I like John McCain."

The 2008 Democratic presidential primaries in Florida and Michigan initially caused the delegates from these two states to be disqualified from being seated at the Democratic Convention due to the states moving their primaries against DNC Party rules. Brazile stated, "We need to send a message that you can't defy the rules," adding, "I have pissed off just about every state in my career."

At the Rules Committee meeting to decide on the final allocations for these states she was quoted: "My momma taught me to play by the rules and respect those rules. My mother taught me, and I'm sure your mother taught you, that when you decide to change the rules, middle of the game, end of the game, that is referred to as cheating."

She was strongly critical of the Stupak–Pitts Amendment, which places limits on taxpayer-funded abortions in the context of the November 2009 Affordable Health Care for America Act.

=== 2012 presidential election ===
For several weeks in the spring of 2011, she served as interim chair of the Democratic National Committee. As vice-chair of the DNC, she led the organization during the transition between outgoing chair Tim Kaine, who resigned to run for the U.S. Senate, and his successor, Florida Congresswoman Debbie Wasserman Schultz, who was not permitted to ascend to the post until at least fifteen days after being nominated on April 5, 2011. Following Wasserman Schultz's installation as DNC chair, Brazile returned to her post as vice-chair.

=== 2016 presidential election ===
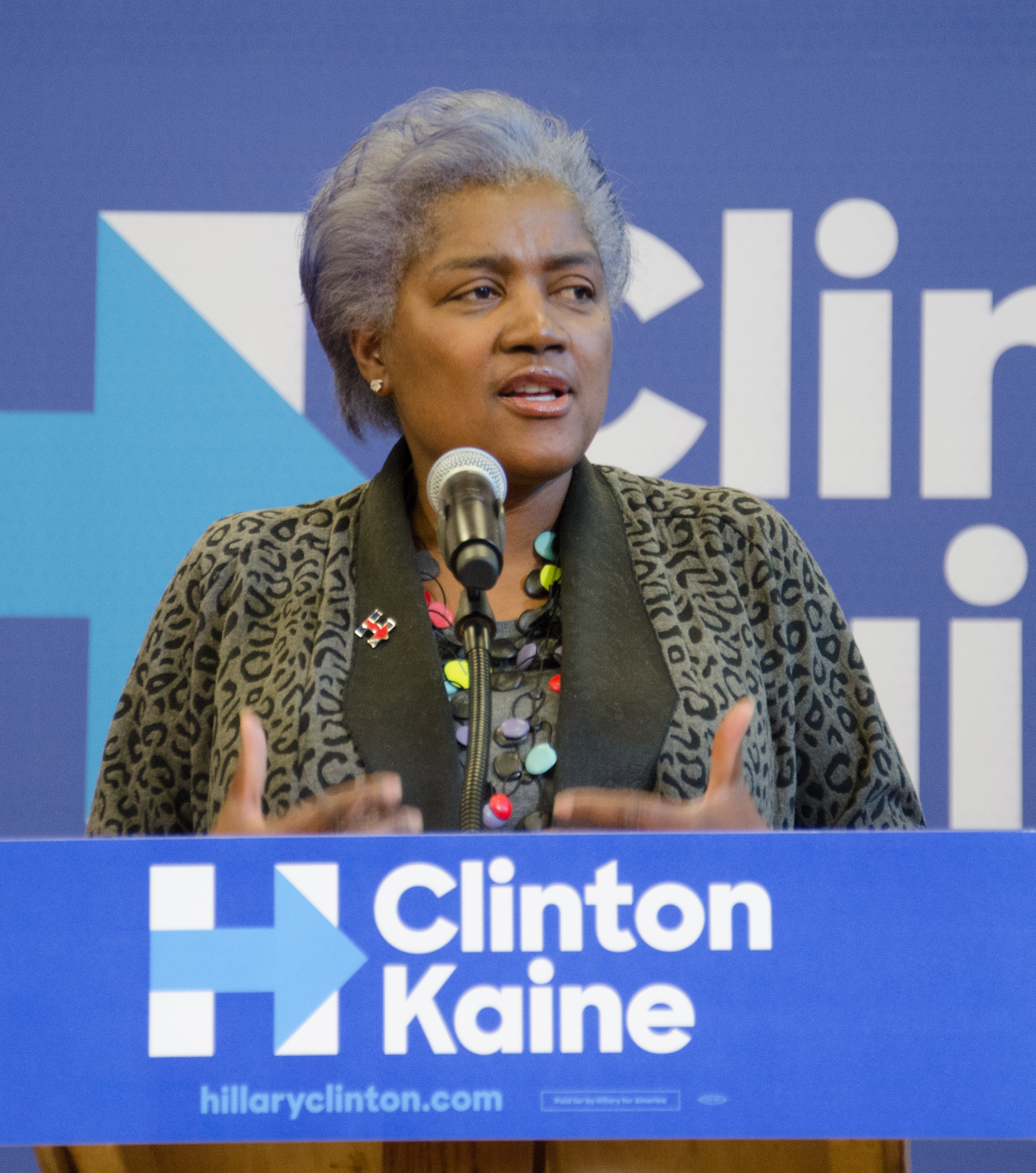
Brazile campaigns for Hillary Clinton at Nashua Community College in New Hampshire, October 7, 2016.

After Debbie Wasserman Schultz resigned her position as chair of the Democratic National Committee on July 24, 2016, at the start of the 2016 Democratic National Convention, Brazile became interim chairperson of the DNC.^{[73]}

Brazile was responsible for a plan to spend money to drive up inner-city turnout in places like Chicago and New Orleans — even though neither Illinois nor Louisiana was competitive — because of fear that Clinton would win the Electoral College vote but lose the popular vote.

==== Sharing debate questions with Clinton campaign ====
A WikiLeaks e-mail dump revealed that Brazile sent an e-mail message on March 5, 2016, to John Podesta and Jennifer Palmieri with the title: "One of the questions directed to HRC tomorrow is from a woman with a rash." The message continued, "her family has lead poison and she will ask what, if anything, will Hillary do as president to help the ppl of Flint." At the next event in Flint, Clinton was delivered a similar question from audience member Mikki Wade, whose family was affected by the poisoned water.

On October 11, 2016, a WikiLeaks e-mail dump included an e-mail Brazile sent on March 12, 2016 to Clinton communications director Jennifer Palmieri with the subject header: "From time to time I get questions in advance." In the e-mail, Brazile discussed her concern about Clinton's ability to field a question regarding the death penalty, and in a CNN town hall debate the following day, Clinton received a similar question about the death penalty. According to tech blog Errata Security, the e-mail in question was verified using an everyday verification program and the DKIM system.

Brazile at first vehemently denied receiving or furnishing the Clinton campaign with any town hall questions and dismissed the WikiLeaks organization as "these sad ass whipper leakers try to slow my groove". She accused TYT Politics reporter Jordan Chariton of "badgering a woman." Questioned by Fox News anchor Megyn Kelly, Brazile said, "As a Christian woman, I understand persecution. I will not sit here and be persecuted because your information is totally false."

Jake Tapper, a former colleague of Brazile's at CNN, provided his perspective on the leak of a question to a Presidential candidate, calling it "very, very upsetting" and added that "journalistically, it's horrifying". Brazile, however, said that her conscience was "very clear". She later commented: "If I had to do it all over again, I would know a hell of a lot more about cybersecurity."

In a talk at the College of Journalism and Mass Communications on the University of Nebraska–Lincoln campus on October 12, 2016, Brazile condemned the leaks, which intelligence officials said came from Russia, and said they were intended to "manipulate an election, disrupt or discredit or destroy our democracy" and ultimately try to "produce an outcome more favorable to them and their interests."

On October 31, 2016, The New York Times reported: "CNN has severed ties with the Democratic strategist Donna Brazile, after hacked e-mails from WikiLeaks showed that she shared questions for CNN-sponsored candidate events in advance with friends on Hillary Clinton's campaign." CNN said it had accepted her formal resignation on October 14, adding: "We are completely uncomfortable with what we have learned about her interactions with the Clinton campaign while she was a CNN contributor."

On November 1, 2016, an internal call about the collusion was initiated by CNN President Jeff Zucker. Zucker informed his staff that, while the instances have been fully investigated and the perpetrators dealt with, the perception that campaigns received questions in advance "hurts all of us," adding that, "I have no tolerance for her behavior or that kind of behavior," going on to describe former network commentator Brazile's interactions with the Clinton campaign as "unethical" and "disgusting."

On March 17, 2017, Brazile admitted to forwarding debate questions to Clinton's campaign during the 2016 Democratic primary, while she was Vice Chair of the DNC and working as a CNN commentator. In an essay she wrote for Time magazine, she said, "Then in October, a subsequent release of e-mails revealed that among the many things I did in my role as a Democratic operative and D.N.C. Vice Chair prior to assuming the interim D.N.C. Chair position was to share potential town hall topics with the Clinton campaign." Brazile went on to explain: "My job was to make all our Democratic candidates look good, and I worked closely with both campaigns to make that happen. But sending those e-mails was a mistake I will forever regret."

In her 2017 memoir Hacks, Brazile wrote about her "alleged leaking of the questions."

== Other work ==
=== University teaching and affiliations ===
Despite the scandal, Brazile went on to serve on various boards, including the National Democratic Institute (NDI), whose mission is to ensure free and fair elections. She was an election monitor in Kenya for the 2022 presidential elections. Brazile served as a lecturer at the University of Maryland, College Park, a fellow at Harvard University's Institute of Politics, and is an adjunct professor of Women and Gender Studies at Georgetown University. She is member of the advisory board of the Washington and Lee University Mock Convention.

=== Commentator ===
Brazile was a weekly contributor and political commentator on CNN's The Situation Room and appeared on American Morning and its successor, New Day. She regularly appeared on CNN Tonight with Don Lemon, and was a frequent member of Anderson Cooper's guest panel of political experts on CNN's Election Night Coverage. Brazile is also founder and managing director of Brazile and Associates and a contributor to NPR's Political Corner and ABC News. Brazile had agreed mutually with both CNN and ABC to suspend her contracts with the networks in order to serve as interim chair of the DNC. On October 31, 2016, CNN announced that Brazile offered a formal resignation and that they were permanently severing their ties to Brazile as a CNN contributor, due to inappropriate leaks with the Clinton campaign while she worked for the network.

On March 18, 2019, Brazile became a contributor for Fox News. She stated that she was "delighted to be joining FOX News" while acknowledging her decision may be criticized by other Democrats.

=== Author ===
Brazile was a contributing writer for Ms. Magazine and a columnist for Roll Call. In 2004, Simon & Schuster published Cooking with Grease – Stirring the Pots in American Politics, Brazile's memoir of her life and work in politics. According to Elisabeth Rosenthal of The New York Times, "While the book is primarily a charming autobiography about how a poor black girl came to run a presidential campaign, its publication is giving the refreshingly impolitic Ms. Brazile the opportunity to pour forth in writing and in interviews on larger issues, like what went wrong in 2000 and what the Democrats need to do to win in 2004."

Brazile is also the coauthor—with Yolanda Caraway, Leah Daughtry, and Minyon Moore—of For Colored Girls Who Have Considered Politics (2018), a joint history and biography.

==== Hacks: The Inside Story ====
In July 2017, Hachette Books announced that it had acquired the rights to Brazile's forthcoming book, Hacks: The Inside Story of the Break-ins and Breakdowns That Put Donald Trump in the White House, published on November 7, 2017. Hachette said the book would be "equal parts campaign thriller, memoir, and roadmap for the future." Matt Latimer and Keith Urbahn, partners at the literary and creative agency Javelin, represented Brazile in negotiations with Hachette. The work is "a savage memoir of her experiences with Clinton's campaign, which she describes as mismanaged and lacking in passion."

In an excerpt of the book published in Politico magazine, Brazile wrote that she had found an "unethical agreement" between the Clinton campaign and the DNC which had allowed Clinton to exert control of the party long before she became its nominee. Later, in an interview on ABC's This Week on November 5, 2017, Brazile said that she had found no evidence of the Democratic primaries having been rigged in favor of Clinton.

Brazile writes that after Clinton fainted at a 9/11 memorial service on September 11, 2016, she gave serious consideration to replacing Clinton as the Democratic nominee, selecting Vice President Joe Biden in her place. Under the DNC charter, the party chair can declare a presidential nominee "disabled," triggering a complex replacement process that involves a meeting of the full DNC. In the interview on ABC, she explained that she "had a lot of other combinations. This is something you play out in your mind." On November 4, 2017, more than 100 former Clinton campaign staffers published an open letter saying they "do not recognize the campaign she portrays in the book." They said they were shocked to learn that Brazile had considered replacing Clinton on the ticket and dismayed that Brazile had seemingly bought into "false Russian-fueled propaganda" about Clinton's health.

The credibility of Brazile's allegations also came under scrutiny by The Washington Post. In September 2015, the newspaper had already reported about the fundraising agreement between Hillary and the DNC which Brazile disclosed and noted that Sanders supporters knew about it. It was also reported that Brazile knew about the agreement before she publicly disclosed its details.

=== Acting ===
Brazile is a member of Screen Actors Guild‐American Federation of Television and Radio Artists (SAG-AFTRA) and has guest-starred as herself in three episodes of the CBS drama The Good Wife and one episode of the Netflix drama House of Cards. She also cameoed as a fictionalized version of herself in Army of the Dead along with Sean Spicer.

== Personal life ==
In 1999, The New York Times Magazine described Brazile as a gay rights activist who served on the board of the Millennium March on Washington. The magazine said she is "highly protective of her privacy" and called her "openly ambiguous" about her sexual orientation.

Brazile is a Catholic and said she wanted to be a priest as a child but did not pursue this after her mother told her girls could not be priests.

On July 9, 2025, Brazile became an honorary member of Delta Sigma Theta sorority.

Party political offices
Preceded by Tim Kaine	Chair of the Democratic National Committee; Acting; 2011	Succeeded by Debbie Wasserman Schultz
Preceded by Debbie Wasserman Schultz	Chair of the Democratic National Committee; Acting; 2016–2017	Succeeded by Tom Perez
