= Jen Psaki =

American political advisor (born 1978)

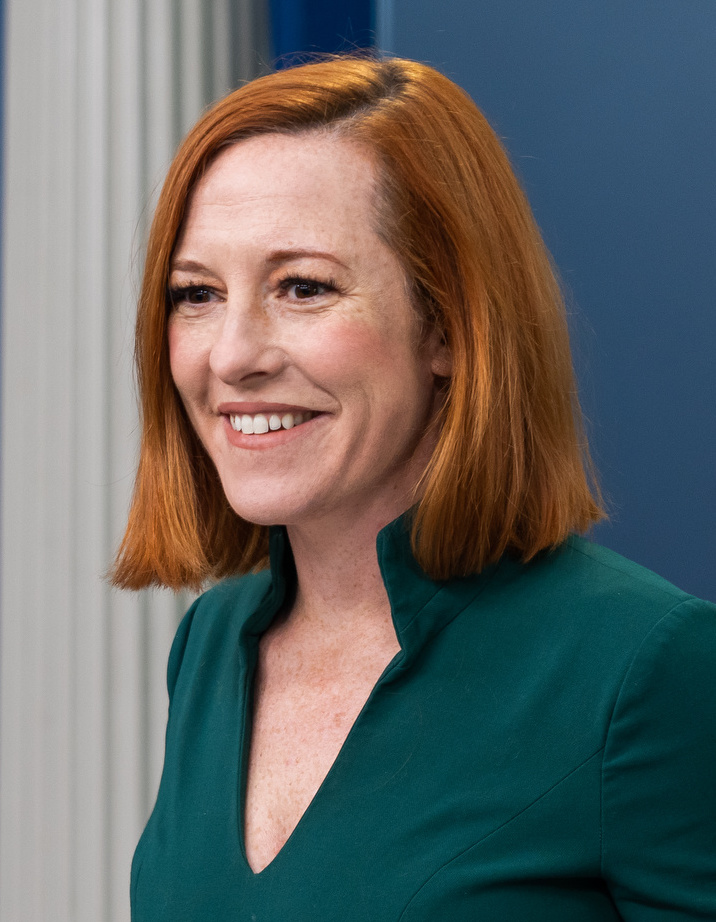
- Psaki in 2022

34th White House Press Secretary
- In office January 20, 2021 – May 13, 2022
- President: Joe Biden
- Deputy: Karine Jean-Pierre (principal deputy)
- Preceded by: Kayleigh McEnany
- Succeeded by: Karine Jean-Pierre

White House Communications Director
- In office April 1, 2015 – January 20, 2017
- President: Barack Obama
- Preceded by: Jennifer Palmieri
- Succeeded by: Sean Spicer

23rd Spokesperson for the United States Department of State
- In office April 5, 2013 – March 31, 2015
- President: Barack Obama
- Deputy: Marie Harf
- Preceded by: Victoria Nuland
- Succeeded by: Marie Harf

White House Deputy Communications Director
- In office December 19, 2009 – September 22, 2011
- President: Barack Obama
- Preceded by: Daniel Pfeiffer
- Succeeded by: Jennifer Palmieri

White House Deputy Press Secretary
- In office January 20, 2009 – December 19, 2009
- President: Barack Obama
- Preceded by: Tony Fratto
- Succeeded by: Bill Burton

Personal details
- Born: Jennifer Rene Psaki; December 1, 1978 (age 47) New York City, U.S.
- Party: Democratic
- Spouse: Gregory Mecher (m. 2010)
- Children: 2
- Education: College of William and Mary (BA)
- Psaki's voice Psaki answering questions on the extent of use of Executive Orders; Recorded May 2, 2022

Jennifer Rene Psaki (/ˈsɑːki/; born December 1, 1978) is an American political analyst and former government official. A political advisor who served under both the Obama and Biden administrations, she served in the Biden administration as the 34th White House press secretary from January 2021 to May 2022. A member of the Democratic Party, she previously served in the Obama administration as the White House deputy press secretary (2009); the White House deputy communications director (2009–2011); the spokesperson for the United States Department of State (2013–2015); and the White House communications director (2015–2017).

Psaki was a political contributor for CNN from 2017 to 2020. As of March 2023, she hosts the talk show Inside with Jen Psaki on MS NOW and later on in May 2025 began hosting The Briefing with Jen Psaki.

== Early life and education ==
Psaki, the eldest of three daughters, was born in New York City in 1978 to psychotherapist Eileen (née Dolan) Medvey and now-retired real estate developer Dimitrios "James" Raul Psaki. She is of Greek and Irish descent. Psaki's parents married in 1976, but would later separate.

Her paternal grandparents were Mary Keane, who died in 1987, and Raoul Constantine Psaki (1916–2009), MD, who was a combat medic during World War II and the Korean War. Her maternal grandparents were Sylvester J. Dailey (1910–1994) and Genevieve Lambert (1910–2002).

Psaki grew up in Stamford, Connecticut and graduated from Greenwich High School in 1996. In 2000, she graduated from the College of William & Mary with a degree in English and sociology. She is a member of the Chi Omega sorority and was chapter president. In college, Psaki swam backstroke competitively for two years for the William & Mary Tribe team.

== Career ==
=== Early career ===
Psaki began her career in 2001 with the re-election campaigns of Iowa Democrats Tom Harkin for the U.S. Senate and Tom Vilsack for governor. Psaki then became deputy press secretary for John Kerry's 2004 presidential campaign. From 2005 to 2006, Psaki served as communications director to U.S. representative Joseph Crowley and regional press secretary for the Democratic Congressional Campaign Committee.

=== Obama administration ===
Throughout the 2008 presidential campaign of U.S. senator Barack Obama, Psaki served as traveling press secretary. After Obama won the election, Psaki followed Obama to the White House as deputy press secretary and was promoted to deputy communications director on December 19, 2009. On September 22, 2011, Psaki left this position to become senior vice president and managing director at the Washington, D.C., office of public relations firm Global Strategy Group.

In 2012, Psaki returned to political communications as press secretary for President Obama's 2012 reelection campaign. On February 11, 2013, Psaki became the spokesperson for the United States Department of State. Her hiring at the Department of State fueled speculation that she would replace White House press secretary Jay Carney when he left the White House, but, on May 30, 2014, it was announced that Josh Earnest would replace Carney. In 2015, she returned to the White House as communications director and stayed through the end of the Obama administration.

On February 7, 2017, Psaki began working as a political commentator on CNN.

=== White House press secretary ===
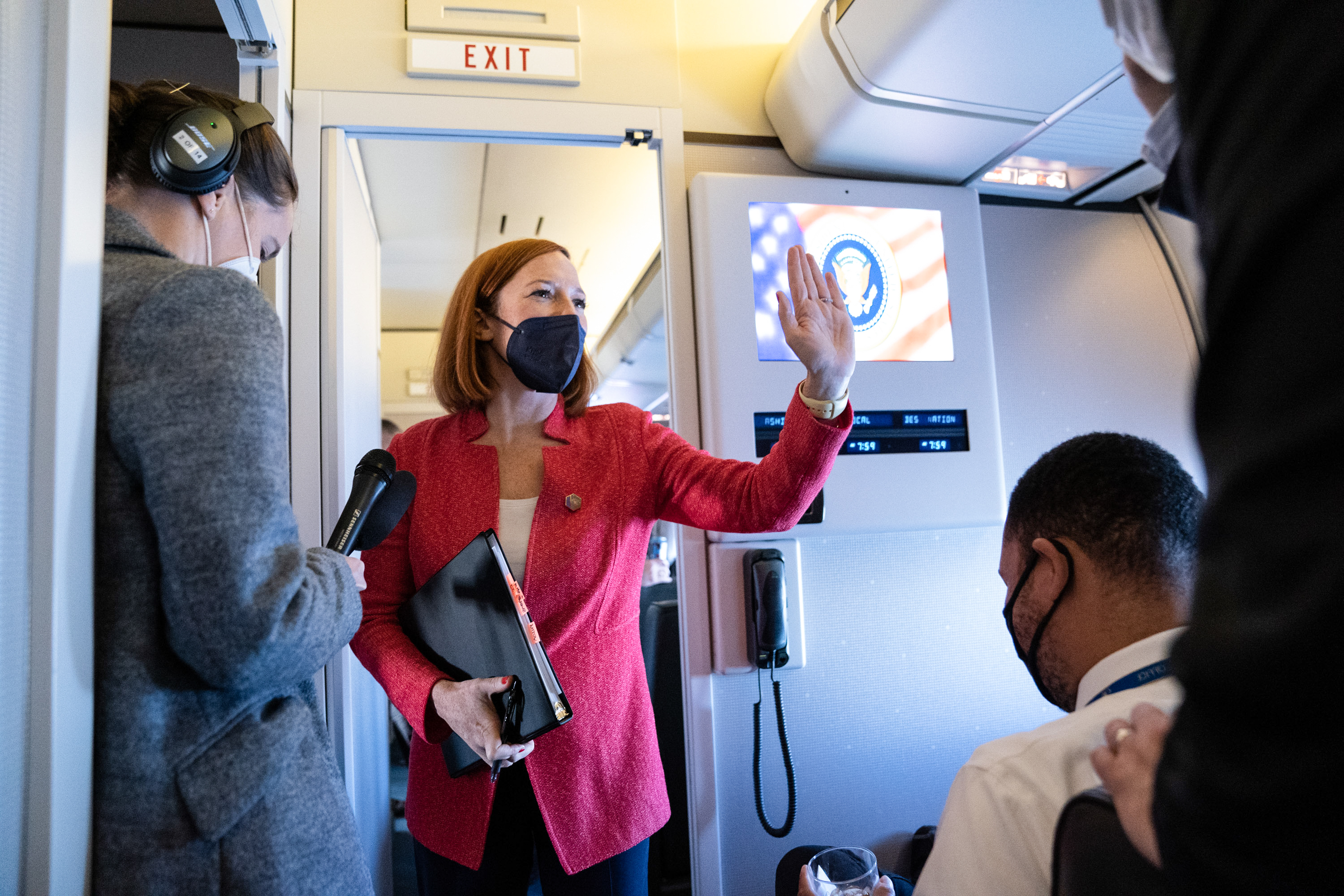
Psaki on Air Force One

In November 2020, Psaki left CNN and joined the Biden–Harris transition team. Later that month, Psaki was named as the White House press secretary for the Biden administration.

She held her first press briefing on the evening of January 20, 2021, after the inauguration. On May 6, in an interview with former senior advisor to the president David Axelrod, Psaki suggested she would depart from the position of press secretary "in about a year from now". In October, Psaki was accused by a watchdog group of violating the Hatch Act for her comments on the 2021 Virginia gubernatorial election. On November 2, Psaki announced that she had tested positive for COVID-19. After quarantining and fully recovering, she returned to work on November 12 and credited her vaccination status for her recovery without complications.

Shortly after returning from her Covid infection and amid the omicron variant spread, Psaki created controversy by sarcastically dismissing the idea of sending testing kits to American families for free, as most other countries had been doing for their citizens. Psaki's tone and remarks received several rebukes in the press, alongside calls for free tests to be made available. Psaki did address the controversy in a later press briefing, but did not apologize. Two weeks later, the Biden administration made free tests available, with the public backlash to Psaki's conduct being cited in part as a reason for the policy change.

On March 22, 2022, Psaki tested positive for COVID-19 for the second time in six months and did not accompany President Biden on his trip to Europe. On April 1, Axios reported that Psaki would likely leave the White House "around May" for a job with MSNBC. On May 5, the White House announced she would be leaving the role on May 13, and named her principal deputy, Karine Jean-Pierre, as her replacement.

=== Later career ===
On May 24, 2022, MSNBC announced its hiring of Psaki as a contributor; the network stated that she would make appearances during its coverage of the 2022 midterms and 2024 presidential elections, and that a show hosted by Psaki was in development for Peacock. Psaki made her first television appearance after leaving her position as White House press secretary on The Tonight Show Starring Jimmy Fallon discussing the Uvalde school shooting.

In February 2023, MSNBC announced that Psaki would host a new Sunday morning program, Inside with Jen Psaki, beginning on March 19, 2023. The program focused on public policy issues. On September 25, 2023, the program took over MSNBC's Monday 8 p.m. Eastern prime time slot, which was previously a secondary timeslot for All In with Chris Hayes. Psaki had occasionally filled in as a substitute host for All In, prompting speculation.

Journalists at NBC News, the sister network of MSNBC, expressed anger and trepidation about Psaki's move to MSNBC, fearing that it would damage NBC's brand and "reinforce the impression, already well-established in opinion polls, that the news business in the US works hand-in-glove with political factions." Psaki negotiated the deal, along with a competing offer from CNN, while still serving in the office of press secretary. This led to concerns from NBC's own White House correspondent, Kristen Welker, that she could have shown favoritism toward her potential employers to secure her new role. Although other staffers have moved from the White House to cable news, making Psaki an anchor and not a political analyst was unusual.

In May 2024, Psaki released a book titled Say More: Lessons from Work, the White House, and the World. The book related her experiences working in government and offered advice on communication. It quickly became a bestseller on Amazon and became listed as a New York Times bestseller. In the book, Psaki stated that President Biden did not look at his watch during the dignified transfer of remains for 13 US service members killed in the Abbey Gate bombing in Afghanistan. However, he had been photographed checking his watch repeatedly during the dignified transfer. Psaki said she would retract the statement in future versions of the book.

In response to Biden dropping out of the 2024 presidential election, Psaki said on X, "He [Biden] has channeled his loss and personal tragedy into a lifetime of public service and an incredibly deep well of empathy for others…Time and time again, Joe Biden proved his incredible strength by getting back up after being knocked down. This time, he shows it by stepping aside." On July 13, 2024, Psaki endorsed Kamala Harris, and stated that Harris is the best alternative to Biden and that she has her full support. However, she believed that Harris' chance of victory in the 2024 presidential race could be lower due to "sexist and racist beliefs".

In June 2024, Psaki agreed to appear before the United States House Committee on Foreign Affairs for a transcribed interview about the Biden Administration's withdrawal from Afghanistan in August 2021. She appeared before the committee on July 26, 2024.

In February 2025, MSNBC announced that Psaki would have her own show The Briefing With Jen Psaki in primetime at 9 pm Tuesday through Friday, starting in April 2025.

== Personal life ==
On May 8, 2010, Psaki married Greg Mecher, then chief of staff to Congressman Steve Driehaus. Later, Mecher served as chief of staff to Congressman Joe Kennedy. The couple met at the Democratic Congressional Campaign Committee in 2006. They have two children.

Political offices
Preceded by Victoria Nuland	Spokesperson for the United States Department of State; 2013–2015	Succeeded by John Kirby
Preceded by Jennifer Palmieri	White House Director of Communications; 2015–2017	Succeeded by Sean Spicer
Preceded by Kayleigh McEnany	White House Press Secretary; 2021–2022	Succeeded by Karine Jean-Pierre
