= Nassau University Medical Center =

Teaching hospital in East Meadow, New York, U.S.

- Nassau Healthcare Corporation
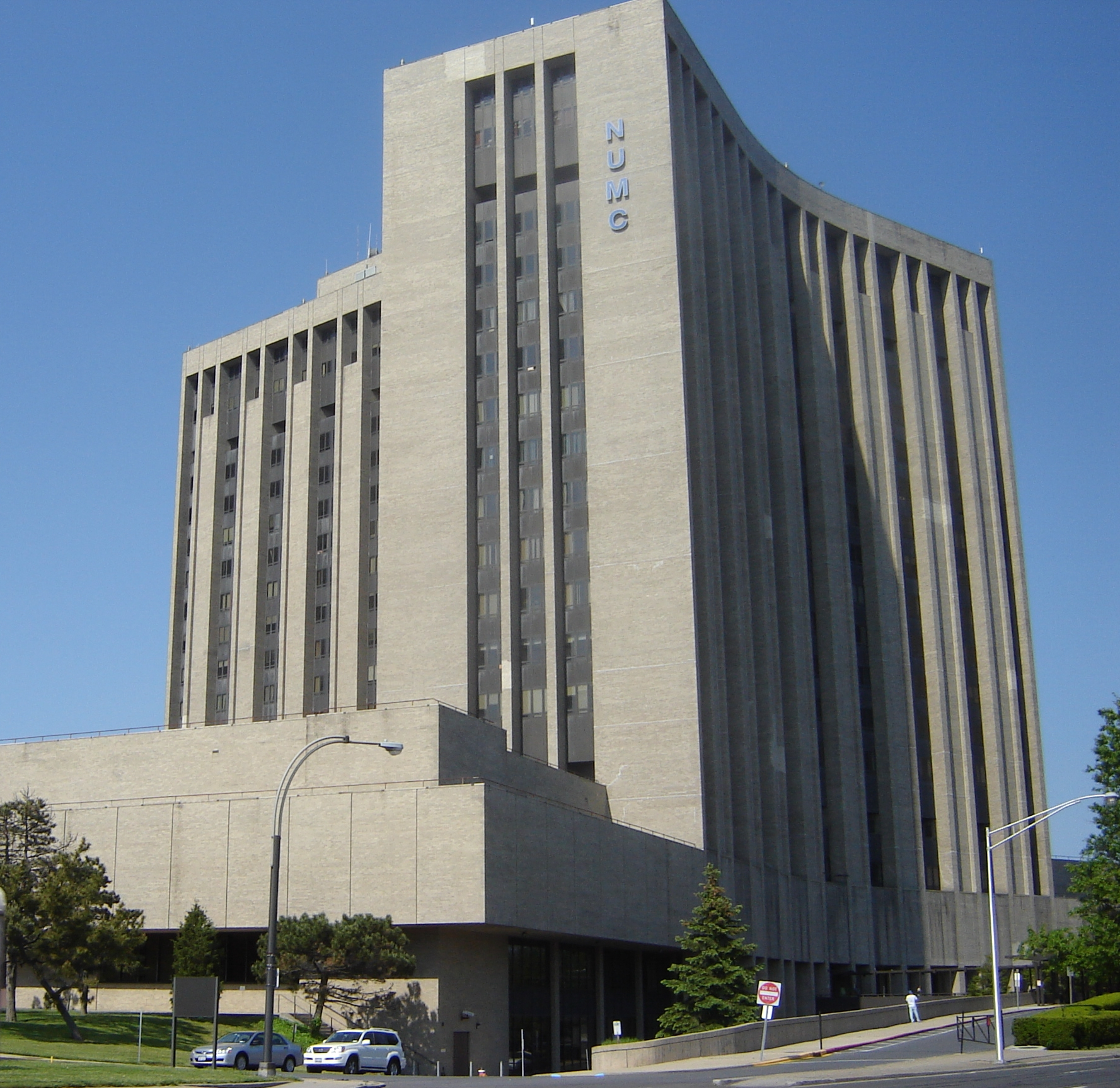
- The front of Nassau University Medical Center

Geography
- Location: 2201 Hempstead Turnpike, East Meadow, Nassau County, New York, United States
- Coordinates: 40°43′33.9816″N 73°33′17.5788″W

Organization
- Care system: Medicare
- Type: Teaching
- Affiliated university: American University of the Caribbean; New York College of Podiatric Medicine; New York Institute of Technology College of Osteopathic Medicine; Stony Brook University School of Medicine

Services
- Emergency department: Level I Trauma Center
- Beds: 631

Helipads
- Helipad: FAA LID: 0NK4
Number	Length		Surface
Number	ft	m	Surface
H1	40 x 40	12 x 12	concrete

History
- Founded: 1974

Links
- Website: numc.edu
- Lists: Hospitals in New York State

Nassau University Medical Center (NUMC) is a public teaching and safety net hospital in East Meadow, New York, United States. The 19-story, 631-bed Level I Trauma Center is located at 2201 Hempstead Turnpike in Nassau County, on Long Island.

== History ==
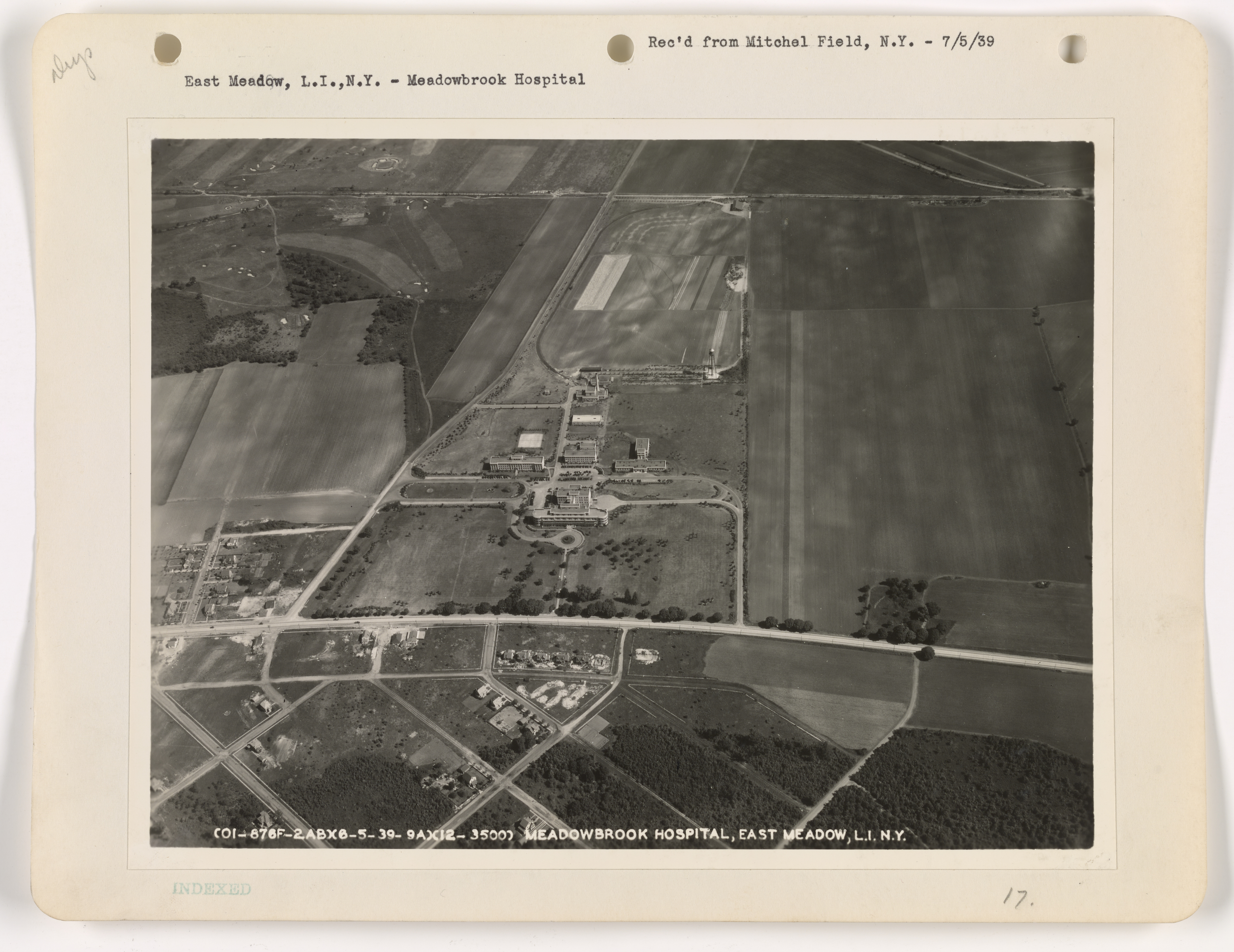
Meadowbrook Hospital in 1939

Meadowbrook Hospital opened on July 15, 1935, in East Meadow as a 200-bed county-owned general hospital. In the 1970s, the hospital's 19-story Dynamic Care Building, designed by Max O. Urbahn, was constructed, opening in 1974.

The hospital's name was changed in 1970 to the Nassau County Medical Center. This caused confusion with Nassau Hospital in Mineola, New York, which a decade later changed its name to Winthrop-University Hospital. The center's name changed again in December 2000, as part of its transition from county-owned hospital to public-benefit corporation, to Nassau University Medical Center to emphasize its affiliation with Stony Brook University's Health Sciences Center.

== Overview ==
The mission of Nassau University Medical Center is to provide comprehensive high-quality health care services to patients regardless of their ability to pay. It is organized as a New York state public-benefit corporation, known as the Nassau Health Care Corporation.

In December 2024, the hospital introduced a US$1.06 billion lawsuit against the State of New York, alleging the intentional withholding of federal funds intended for the hospital over the course of several years. This action originated from a posited state takeover from Nassau Interim Finance Authority.

In June 2025, Megan Ryan, then-CEO of Nassau University Medical Center, was fired for cause after allegedly authorizing $3.5 million in payments—at least $1 million of which were deemed excessive—to herself and 12 others, according to a letter from interim CEO Dr. Richard Becker. The payments were made just days before a new oversight board was set to take effect on June 1.

== Organization ==
The Nassau Health Care Corporation is guided by an 11-member board of directors. In May 2025, Governor Kathy Hochul appointed Stuart Rabinowitz, who led Hofstra University for over 20 years, to lead the board as well as 3 additional appointees, Konstantinos “Dean” Mihaltses, Lisa Warren, and Amy Flores.

The corporation's management team is led by Dr Richard Becker as interim CEO. Korn Ferry will lead a search for a permanent CEO and general counsel. In 2016, it had operating expenses of $598 million, an outstanding debt of $256 million, and a staffing level of 4,180 people.

== Dynamic Care Building ==
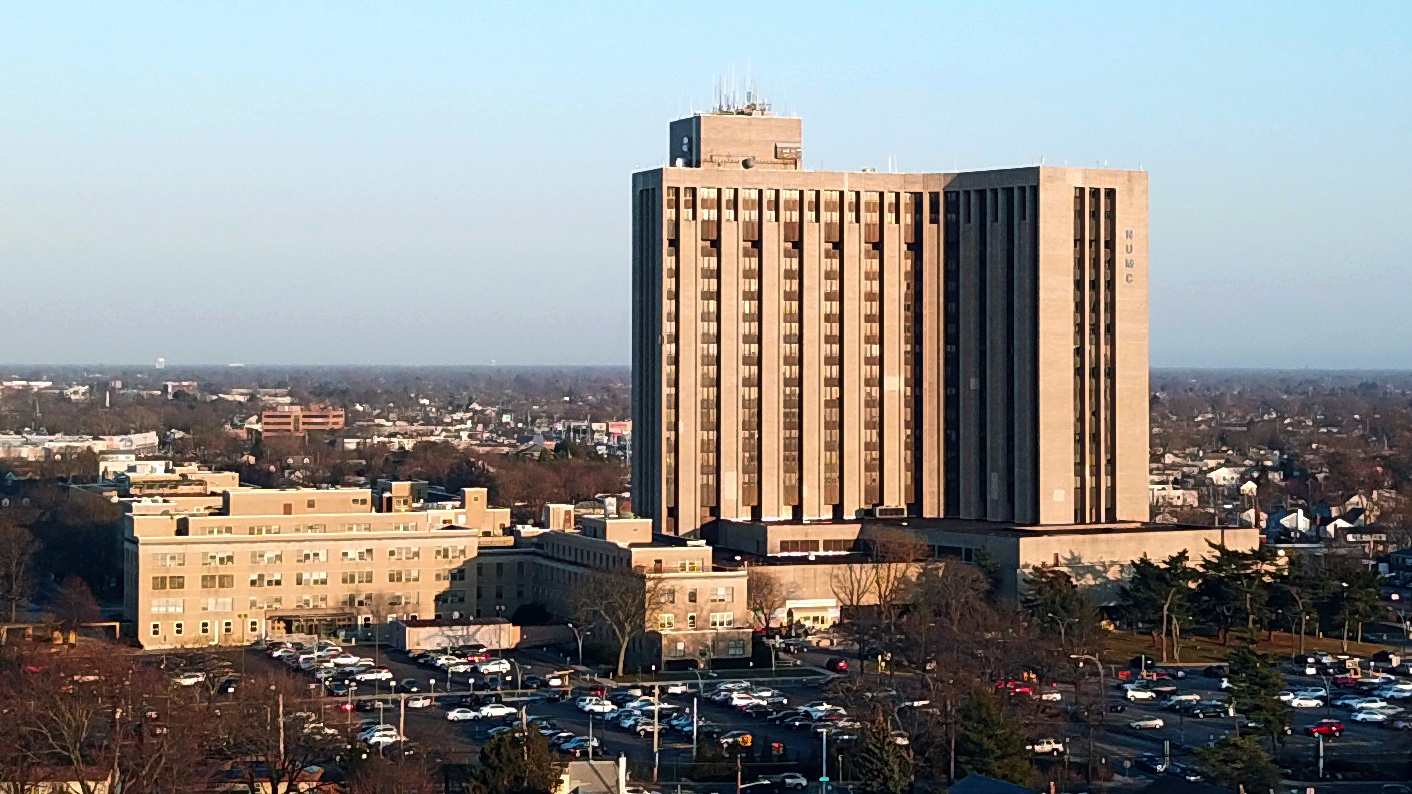
NUMC's Dynamic Care Building, viewed from the northwest

Opening in 1974 and at 299 feet, NUMC's Dynamic Care Building remains the tallest inhabitable building in Nassau County. The facility includes:

- one- and two-bed patient rooms with private bathrooms
- physical and rehabilitation center
- 12 operating room suites
- 300-seat auditorium
- two-level Health Sciences Library
- helicopter landing pad
- interfaith chapel
- The Nassau County Firefighters' Burn Center
- the only multiplace hyperbaric chamber on Long Island, with a team on call 24/7 for diving, carbon monoxide poisoning, and all hyperbaric-related emergencies

== Patient care ==
More than 80,000 people annually are treated in the emergency room and 178,000 in its more than 85 specialty clinics. It is accredited by the Commission on Cancer for Teaching Hospital Cancer Programs and is a designated AIDS Center. Its staff totals more than 3,500.

== See also ==
- List of tallest buildings on Long Island
- Erie County Medical Center
- Roswell Park Comprehensive Cancer Center
- Westchester Medical Center University Hospital
