= Churchill solitaire =

Solitaire variant

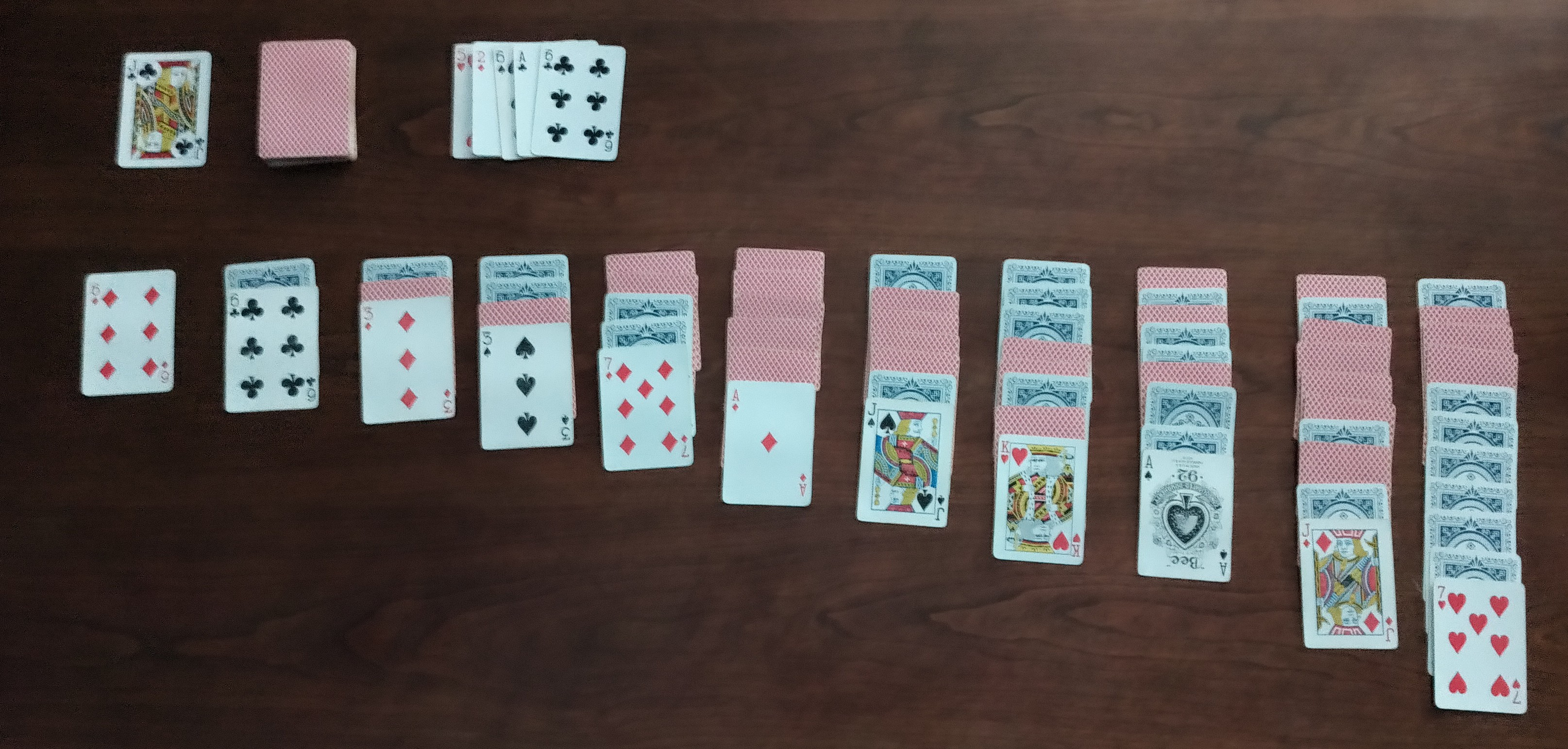
A physical game of Churchill solitaire

Churchill solitaire is a variant of patience (also called solitaire). A mobile version of the game involved Donald Rumsfeld in its development, and was released in 2016. According to Rumsfeld, the variant was created by Winston Churchill in 1940.

== Solitaire variant ==
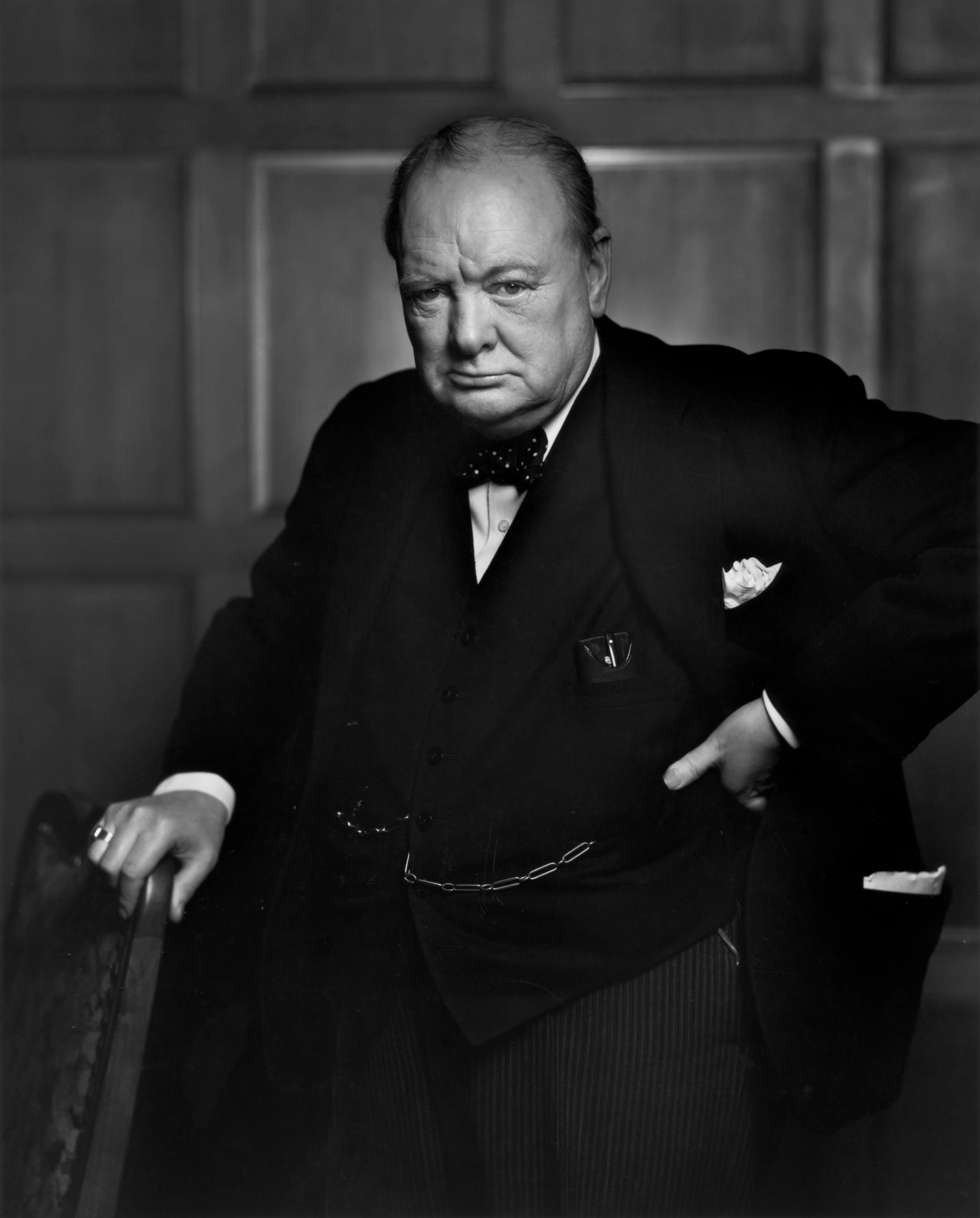
According to Rumsfeld, the solitaire variant was developed by Winston Churchill.

Rumsfeld was taught how to play Churchill Solitaire in 1973, by diplomat André de Staercke, who learned it directly from Churchill. Rumsfeld said that Churchill began playing it during The Blitz in 1940. In a Medium post, Rumsfeld wrote that "there were probably a dozen or so people in the entire world who knew how to play [Churchill Solitaire]", and that he had the mobile game developed in order to preserve it.

The variation uses two decks of cards and ten columns, instead of one deck and seven columns (as used in Klondike). It also adds "the Devil's Six", a set of six cards which the player has to place directly into the wastepile and cannot use within the tableau. The variant has been labelled difficult by Rumsfeld himself and multiple newspapers.

== Mobile app ==
The Churchill Solitaire app was developed by Rumsfeld, Snapdragon Studios, and Javelin, and was released in 2016. Rumsfeld had previously worked with Javelin to publish his book Rumsfeld's Rules. Javelin – named for the Secret Service code name for Joyce Pierson, Rumsfeld's wife – is owned by Keith Urbahn, who previously served as Rumsfeld's chief of staff while he was Secretary of Defense.

Rumsfeld was uninvolved in its programming, though he playtested it. He said he did not have "much of an idea of what an app even was" prior to development.

The game is themed after World War II and contains archival footage of Churchill. It is free to download, though contains in-app purchases, which are donated to charity. A campaign is also featured, in which players learn of Churchill's life between games. In 2019, it was removed from Google Play due to depicting tobacco smoking on both the cover and featured footage, being reinstated after the age rating was updated to include nicotine depictions as part of the app's age rating.

Churchill Solitaire received positive reviews from critics. Writing for Trusted Reviews, Keith Andrew rated it 3/5 stars, calling it "a solid, if unspectacular, take on solitaire". Brian Barrett of Wired disagreed with its perceived difficulty, calling it "solitaire-plus", though still enjoyed it.
