= Jennifer Palmieri =

American presidential advisor (born 1966)

Jen Palmieri
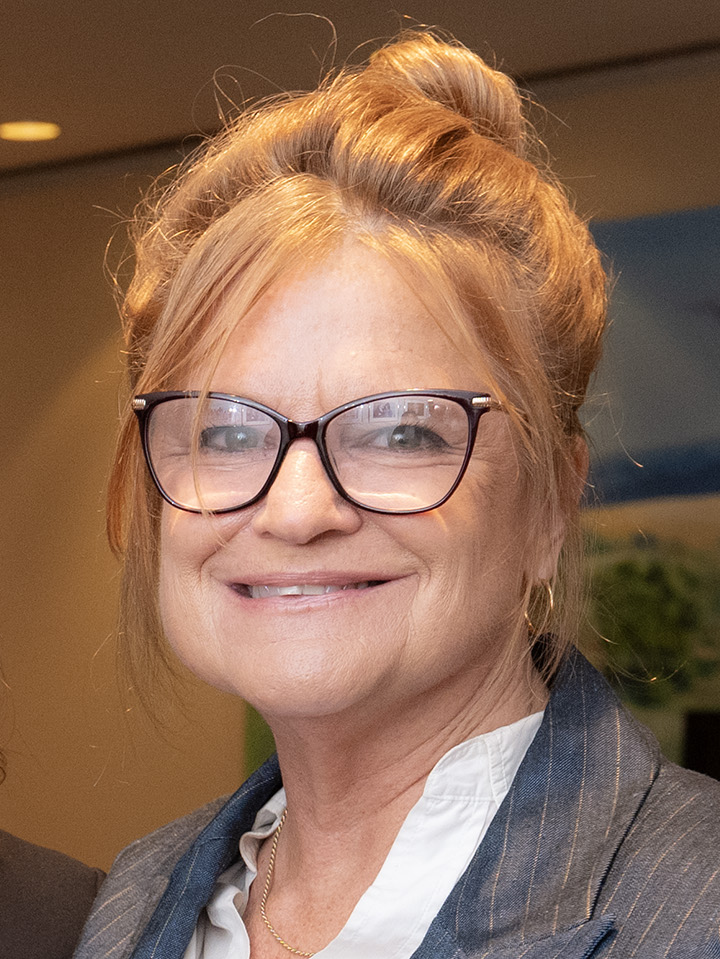
- Palmieri in 2025

White House Communications Director
- In office January 25, 2013 – April 1, 2015
- President: Barack Obama
- Preceded by: Daniel Pfeiffer
- Succeeded by: Jen Psaki

Personal details
- Born: November 15, 1966 (age 60) Pascagoula, Mississippi, U.S.
- Party: Democratic
- Education: American University (BA)

Jennifer M. Palmieri (/pɒlˈmɛəri/; born November 15, 1966) is an American political advisor and media personality who served as White House Director of Communications from 2013 to 2015 and Director of Communications for the Hillary Clinton 2016 presidential campaign. Palmieri was the co-host of the political documentary series The Circus on Showtime from 2021 to 2023.

== Early life and education ==
Palmieri was born in Pascagoula, Mississippi. Palmieri's family frequently moved growing up due to her father's career in the US Navy, ultimately settling in California when she was 11. After attending American University, she began her career working for then-Congressman Leon Panetta (D-CA).

== Career ==
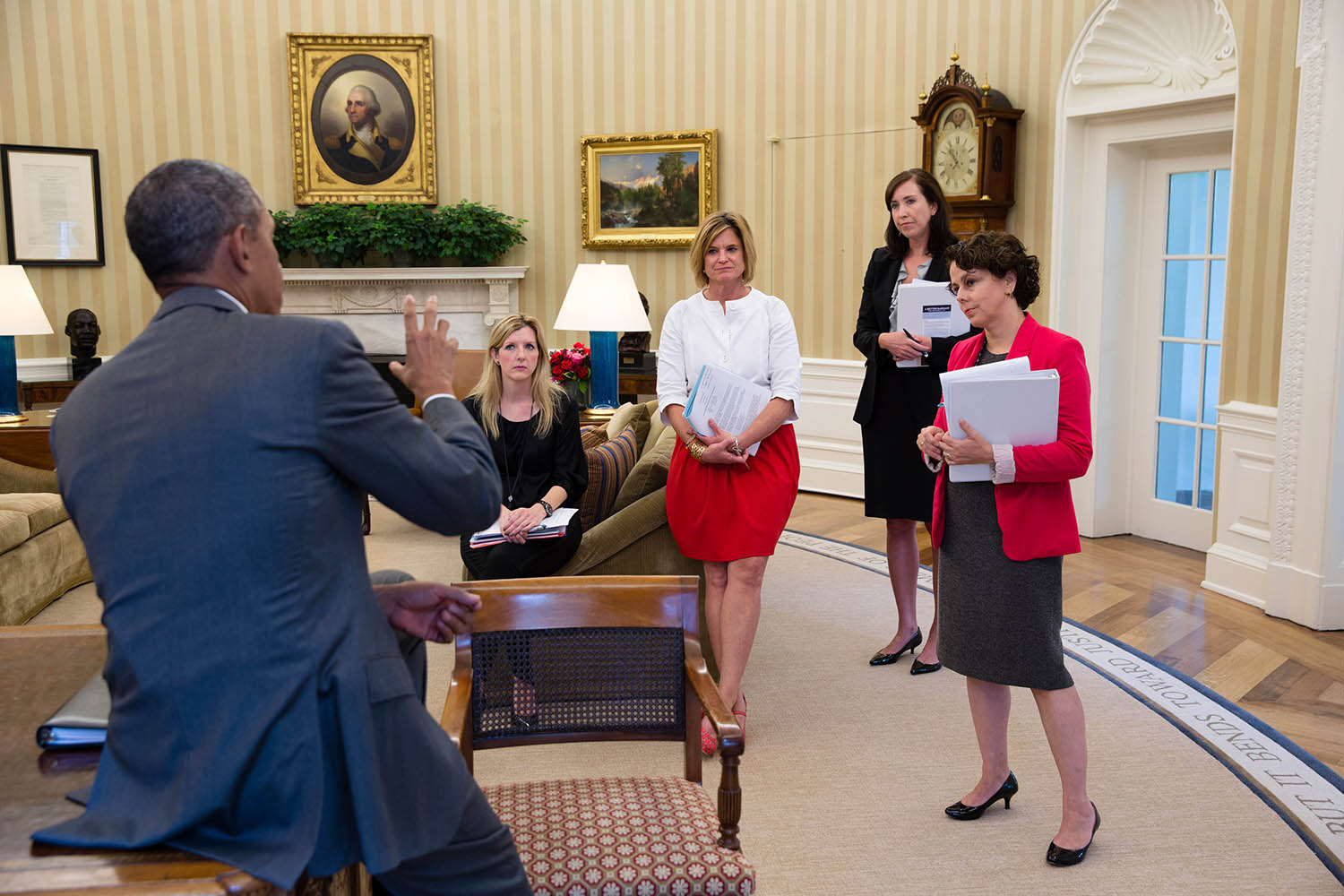
Palmieri (center) among advisors to President Barack Obama (left) in 2013

Palmieri served as White House Communications Director for U.S. President Barack Obama. Before her service at the White House, she served as the Senior Vice President of Communications for the Center for American Progress and the President of the Center for American Progress Action Fund. Earlier, Palmieri was the National Press Secretary for the 2004 John Edwards presidential campaign and for the Democratic National Committee in 2002, after a brief time at the advocacy group Americans for Gun Safety. She served in the Clinton Administration as Special Assistant to White House Chief of Staff Leon Panetta, then deputy director of Scheduling and Advance, and finally as a Deputy White House Press Secretary the last three years of Clinton's presidency.

=== WikiLeaks 2016 email hack ===
Palmieri attracted controversy when an email chain allegedly showing Clinton aides joking about Catholics and evangelicals in 2011 was released by WikiLeaks. U.S. intelligence agencies concluded that individuals with connections to the Russian government had conducted a spear-phishing attack against Clinton campaign chair John Podesta as part of an operation to prevent Hillary Clinton from winning the 2016 U.S. presidential election.

In the emails between Palmieri, Podesta, and John Halpin of the Center for American Progress, Halpin reportedly wrote that 21st Century Fox Chairman Rupert Murdoch and NewsCorp Chief Executive Robert Thomson were drawn to Catholicism because of the faith's "systemic thought and severely backward gender relations."

Palmieri, herself a Catholic, purportedly responded that she believes Murdoch, Thomson, and many other conservatives are Catholic because they think it is "the most socially acceptable politically conservative religion ... Their rich friends wouldn't understand if they became evangelicals", she wrote.

The president of CatholicVote.org, a religious conservative 501(c)(4) organization, demanded Palmieri resign from the campaign, saying:

Everyone has a unique faith journey, and it's just insulting to make blanket statements maligning people's motives for converting to another faith tradition. Had Palmieri spoken this way about other groups she would be dismissed. Palmieri must resign immediately or be fired.

Podesta did not respond in the email thread. Palmieri said she "didn't recognize (the email) ... [but] we are not going to fact check each of the emails that were stolen, hacked by Russian-led efforts in an effort to hurt our campaign."

=== Hillary Clinton presidential campaign 2016 ===
At a Harvard University forum held on December 1, 2016, to define the Clinton Campaign for the historical record, Palmieri described Clinton's email controversy as "the most grossly overrated, over-covered and most destructive story in all of presidential politics." Palmieri's role in the campaign is described in the book by Donna Brazile, Hacks: The Inside Story of the Break-ins and Breakdowns That Put Donald Trump in the White House and Shattered: Inside Hillary Clinton's Doomed Campaign.

=== The Circus: Inside the Greatest Political Show on Earth ===
Palmieri joined the Showtime documentary series, The Circus: Inside the Greatest Political Show on Earth, as guest host, beginning October 13, 2019, with season four episode twelve, Desperate Times, Desperate Measures.

Palmieri was announced to be a permanent co-host beginning on January 10, 2021, with the premiere of season 6. She remained with the series until its end in 2023.

Palmieri is a contributing editor to Vanity Fair.

=== 2024 Kamala Harris presidential campaign ===
In August 2024, campaign officials for the presidential campaign of Kamala Harris announced that Palmieri will be a senior adviser to Doug Emhoff, the second gentleman.

Political offices
Preceded by Dan Pfeiffer	White House Director of Communications; 2013–2015	Succeeded by Jen Psaki
