= Max O. Urbahn =

German-born American architect (1912–1995)

- Born: February 2, 1912; Burscheid, Germany
- Died: July 9, 1995 (aged 83); Stonington, Connecticut, US
- Occupation: Architect
- Awards: Fellow of the American Institute of Architects

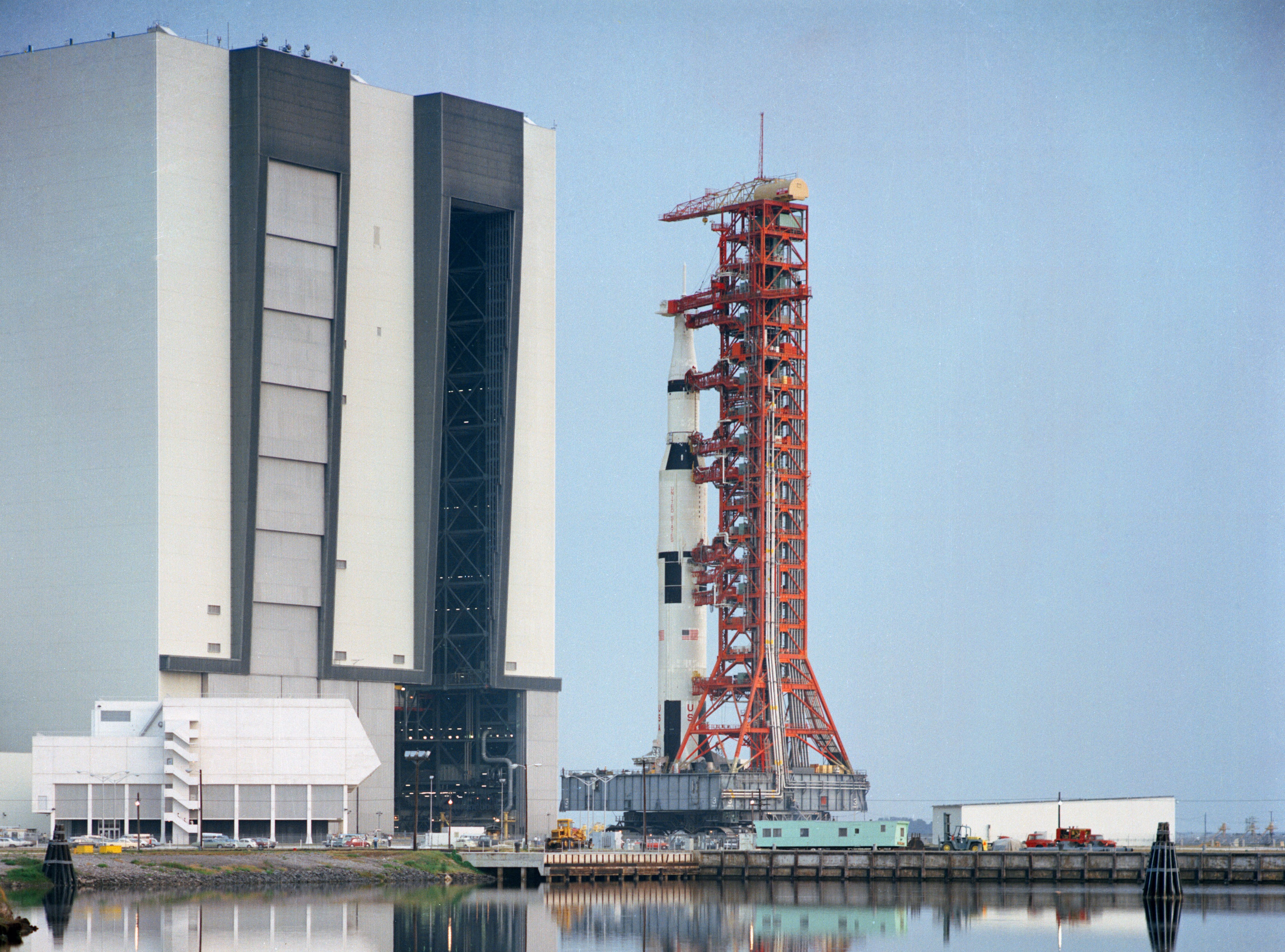
The Vehicle Assembly Building at the Kennedy Space Center, designed by URSAM and completed in 1966. Pictured in 1971 during the Apollo 15 rollout.

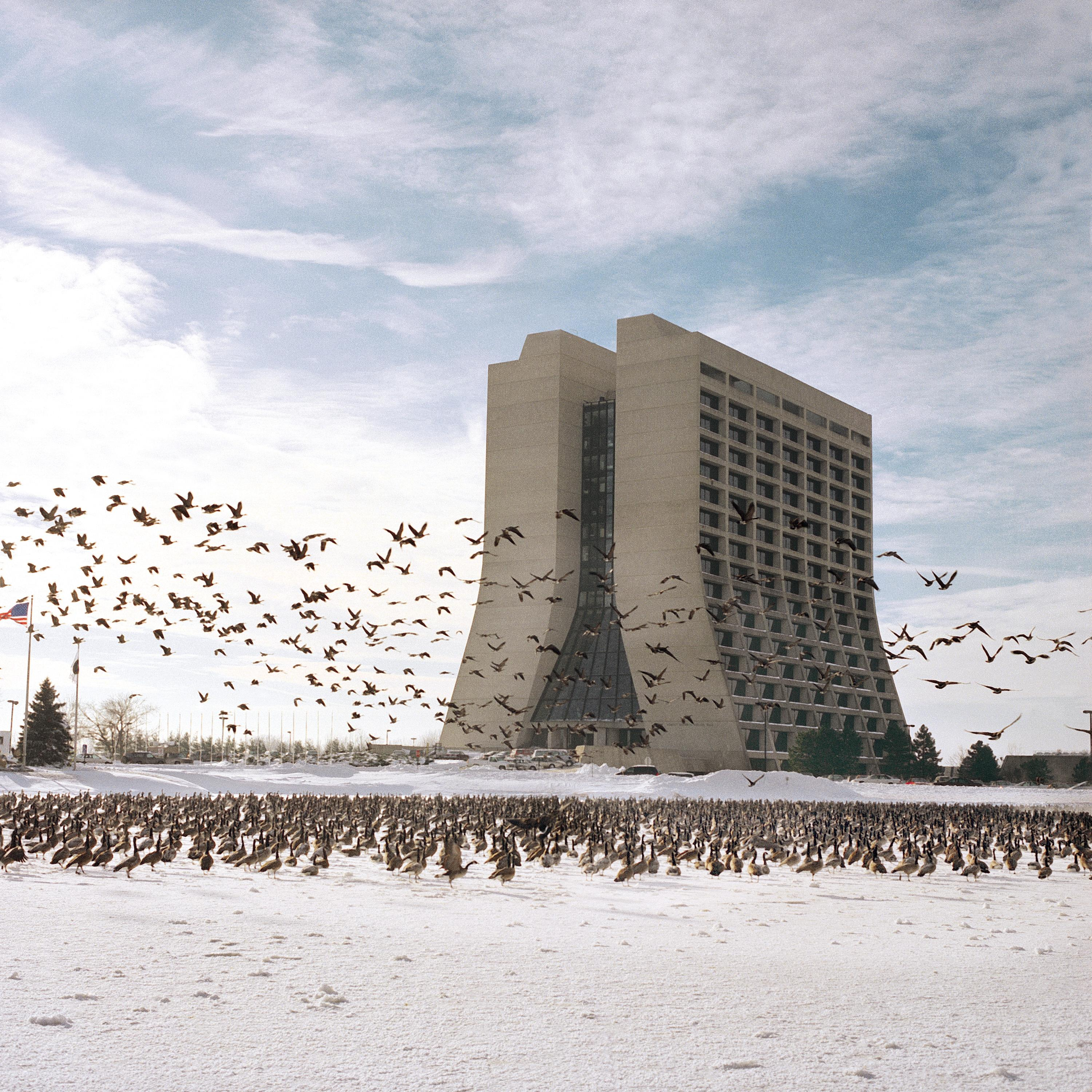
Wilson Hall at Fermilab, designed by DUSAF and completed in 1973.

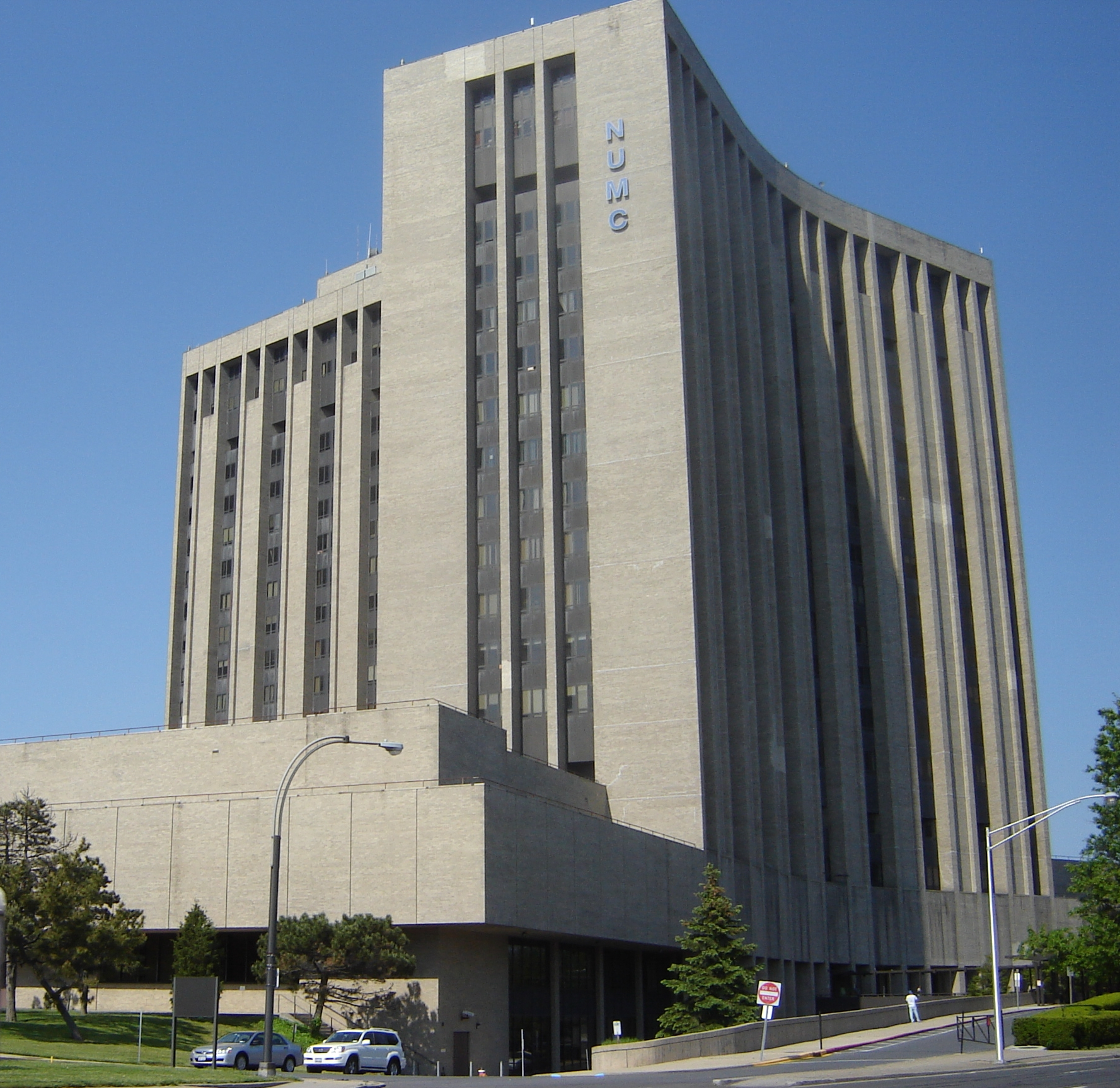
Nassau University Medical Center on Long Island, completed in 1974.

Max O. Urbahn FAIA (1912–1995) was a German-born American architect in practice in New York City and Connecticut from 1945 until his death in 1995. Among his notable projects is the Vehicle Assembly Building at the Kennedy Space Center, one of the largest buildings in the world. He served as president of the American Institute of Architects for the year 1972.

== Life and career ==
Maximilian Otto Urbahn, known professionally as Max O. Urbahn, was born February 2, 1912, in Burscheid, Germany, to Maximilian Otto Urbahn and Hedwig (Hilbertz) Urbahn. His family immigrated to the United States in 1925, and Urbahn later became a citizen. He earned a BS in architecture from the University of Illinois in 1935 followed by a BFA and an MFA from Princeton University. Over the next few years he worked for Eggers & Higgins and in the New York City branch office of Holabird & Root. He served in the United States Army Corps of Engineers from 1942 to 1945. In 1945 he cofounded the firm of Reisner & Urbahn, architects, with Jedd Stow Reisner, and in 1952 the partnership was expanded to include Richard M. Brayton and John S. Burrows Jr. When Reisner withdrew in 1954 the firm became Urbahn, Brayton & Burrows. Burrows withdrew in 1961, followed by Brayton in 1963, and the firm was again reorganized as the Office of Max O. Urbahn.

Urbahn was noted as a coordinator of large teams for the design of complex projects. In 1962 he was hired to lead the design of what would become the Vehicle Assembly Building for NASA at the Kennedy Space Center. To complete this project he organized URSAM, a joint venture of the Urbahn firm and the engineering firms of Roberts & Schaefer, Seelye Stevenson Value & Knecht (STV) and Moran, Proctor, Mueser & Rutledge. The resulting building, completed in 1966, is still one of the largest buildings in the world by volume. Other major projects completed by Urbahn include Fermilab, designed by a DUSAF, the joint venture of Daniel, Mann, Johnson & Mendenhall, Urbahn, STV and the George A. Fuller Company, and 909 Third Avenue in New York City. In the 1970s Urbahn again reorganized his firm as Max O. Urbahn Associates. He retired from his New York practice in 1978 but continued to practice on a smaller scale near his home in eastern Connecticut. As of 2023, his firm, now known as Urbahn Architects, remains active in New York City.

Urbahn joined the American Institute of Architects (AIA) in 1947 as a member of the New York City chapter. He served in various chapter roles before being elected to the AIA board of directors in 1968. In 1969 he was elected first vice president/president elect for 1971 and president for 1972. During his presidency Urbahn oversaw significant revisions to the AIA code of ethics under pressure from the Nixon administration and advocated for a national land-use policy. Urbahn was elected a fellow of the AIA in 1966. Urbahn was also a member and post president of the Society of American Military Engineers (SAME), a vice president of the Pan American Federation of Architects' Associations (FPAA) and a director of the American Arbitration Association.

== Personal life ==
Urbahn was married three times: first to Marion Frank in 1937, second to Allyn Delano Smith in 1957 and third to Bess (Engelbrethsen) Balchen in 1979. He had a total of three children, all sons: Eric McGregor, Maximilian Otto III and John Arthur. Urbahn died July 9, 1995, at home in Stonington, Connecticut, at the age of 83.

Urbahn's eldest son, Eric M. Urbahn is an architect in practice in Cabarete, Dominican Republic, and his grandson is Keith Urbahn.

== Legacy ==
SAME has awarded a medal in his name since 1997.

== Architectural works ==
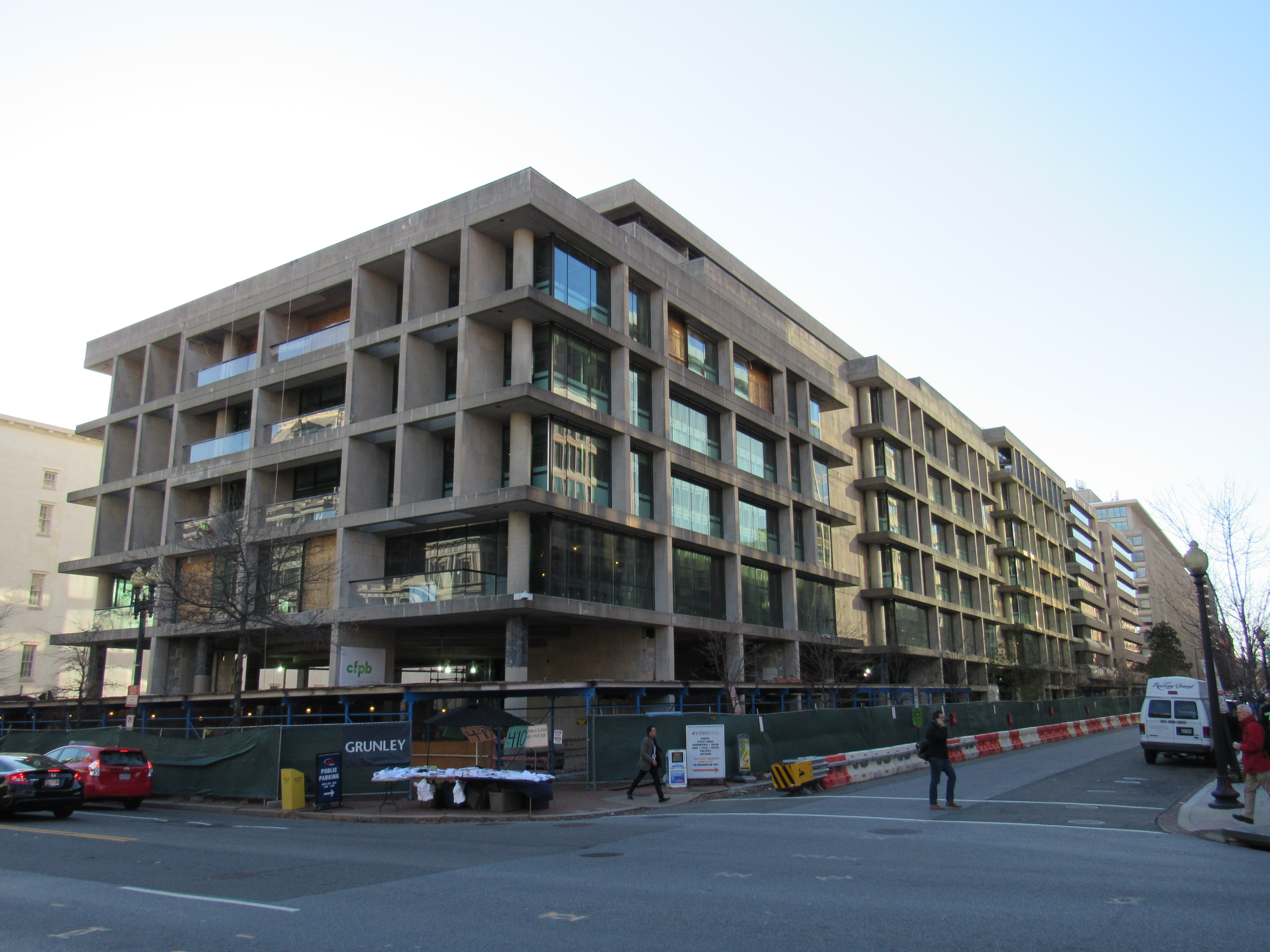
The former Federal Home Loan Bank Board Building in Washington, D.C., completed in 1977.

- University Hospital of Brooklyn, 445 Lenox Rd, Brooklyn (1966)
- 909 Third Avenue, New York City (1967)
- Junior High School 144 Michelangelo, 2545 Gunther Ave, The Bronx (1968)
- Bronx Children's Psychiatric Center, 1300 Waters Pl, The Bronx (1969)
- Public School 214 Lorraine Hansberry, 1970 W Farms Rd, The Bronx (1973)
- Lincoln Hospital, 234 East 149th St, The Bronx (1976)
- Nassau University Medical Center, East Meadow, New York (1974)
- Federal Home Loan Bank Board Building, 1700 G St NW, Washington, D.C. (1977, NRHP 2016)
- James J. Peters Department of Veterans Affairs Medical Center, 130 W Kingsbridge Rd, The Bronx (1979)
