= Keith Urbahn =

American literary agent, writer, and Navy officer

- Education: Yale University (BA)
- Occupations: President and founding partner of the company Javelin

Keith Urbahn is the president and founding partner of Javelin, a literary and creative agency based in Alexandria, Virginia. He was formerly a speechwriter at the Pentagon, an aide to Donald Rumsfeld and Mitch McConnell, and a U.S. Navy reserve intelligence officer. While in the Navy, on May 1, 2011, Urbahn was the first person to leak the news of Osama bin Laden's killing in Pakistan by U.S. Navy SEALs.

== Education ==
Urbahn studied religion and Arabic as an undergraduate at Yale University. He graduated summa cum laude in 2006.

== Professional career ==
Urbahn worked for former Secretary of Defense Donald Rumsfeld as a speechwriter at the Pentagon, and served as Rumsfeld's chief of staff from 2009 to 2012. He helped oversee the publication of Rumsfeld's 2011 memoir Known and Unknown. He previously worked in the U.S. Senate for Republican Majority Leader Mitch McConnell.

Urbahn also served as a commissioned reserve intelligence officer in the U.S. Navy. He is credited as the person who first broke the news of Osama bin Laden's killing on May 1, 2011, when he tweeted, "So I'm told by a reputable person they have killed Osama Bin Laden. Hot damn."

== Javelin ==
With his business partner Matt Latimer, Urbahn founded Javelin in 2011. Among the projects Urbahn has overseen at Javelin is the development and launch of Churchill Solitaire, an app of a version of solitaire once played by Winston Churchill. In addition, he has represented authors and media personalities on book and television deals, such as Donna Brazile, James Comey, Tucker Carlson, John Bolton, Maggie Haberman, and Norah O’Donnell.

The agency has also expanded into digital and creative ventures, including projects such as Churchill Solitaire. Javelin's public relations arm works with Fortune 500 companies and major nonprofits on media booking and placement, crisis and litigation communications, and media training.

As of 2026, Urbahn continues to act as a lead agent on new political and nonfiction titles, including major upcoming book projects in U.S. politics and public affairs.

== Personal life ==
Urbahn lives in Alexandria, Virginia and has two children, Benjamin and William. Urbahn is the son of Jennifer K. Urbahn and Maximilian O. Urbahn III. His grandfather, Max O. Urbahn, was a prolific architect of government buildings whose work included the design of one of the world's largest structures, the Vehicle Assembly Building at Cape Canaveral, Florida.

Urbahn has publicly commented on political polarization, media dynamics, and the publishing industry. He has warned about declining trust between political groups in the United States and the impact of polarization on civic life. He has also criticized elements of modern political journalism, arguing that heightened media reactions and outrage-driven coverage can contribute to public distrust while simultaneously fueling demand for political books and commentary.
