= Sandy Newman =

American non-profit executive (born 1952)

Sanford "Sandy" Newman (born April 25, 1952) is an American non-profit executive. Between 1982 and 2017, he founded and served as president of three non-profits, Project VOTE!, Fight Crime: Invest in Kids, and Voices for Progress.

== Early life and education ==
Newman was born and raised in Washington, D.C and graduated from Walt Whitman High School. He went on to earn a Bachelor of Arts in government from Wesleyan University in 1974 and a J.D. from the University of Virginia Law School. He is the son of a labor, civil rights and women's rights attorney Winn Newman and women's rights advocate Elaine Newman, and became involved in civil rights advocacy as a teen.

== Career ==
Following law school, Newman was a law clerk for Judge Jean S. Breitenstein on the U.S. Court of Appeals for the 10th Circuit. He then conducted test case litigation for the Center for Law and Social Policy, aimed at increasing access to health care for the poor and minorities.

=== Project VOTE! ===
In 1982 Newman started Project VOTE!, a national non-profit focused on increasing voter registration among low-income and minority citizens. He was one of the first people to advocate providing voter registration services at government assistance agencies—an idea that became law in the National Voter Registration Act of 1993. During his tenure, the volunteers recruited by Project VOTE! organizers registered over two million voters, including 563,000 in 1992. In that year, Newman hired Barack Obama to be Project VOTE's Illinois State Director. Years later, Obama shared the story in a video aimed at motivating his presidential campaign's volunteers to register voters.

=== Fight Crime: Invest in Kids ===
In 1995, Newman founded Fight Crime: Invest in Kids. The organization is a national non-profit focused on increasing public safety through public investments in programs proven to help children get a good start. It is made up of nearly 5,000 police chiefs, sheriffs, and elected prosecutors who advocate for programs such as early childhood education, child abuse prevention, prenatal care, and coaching for parents.

=== Voter engagement and civic participation consulting ===
In 2003, Newman became concerned that large-scale minority voter registration drives by non-profit, non-partisan organizations had not been conducted since 1994. He shifted to a part-time status at Fight Crime: Invest in Kids and began advising donors and non-profit organizations in an effort to spur larger minority voter registration drives. In 2004, over 1.4 million new voters were successfully added to the rolls by non-profit organizations. In 2005, Newman resigned from the presidency of Fight Crime: Invest-in-Kids and began full-time advising of donors. In 2008, non-profits successfully registered four million new voters.

=== Voices for Progress ===
In 2009, Newman founded Voices for Progress, which combines the strategy of grassroots organizing with the influence of leaders. Newman developed this organization to advocate for climate change regulation, education funding and economic opportunity, immigration reform, campaign finance reform, and other issues. He stepped down as president in April, 2017, and was succeeded by Daniel Penchina.

=== Focus for Democracy ===
Newman is now a co-founder and partner in Focus for Democracy Action, which deeply evaluates organizations and then advises its network of 5,000 donors on how their contributions to charitable 501(c)(3) programs and 501(c)(4) contributions can do the most to strengthen democracy.
