= Matt Latimer =

White House Deputy Director of Speechwriting
- In office March 20, 2007 – October 2008
- President: George W. Bush
- Leader: William McGurn

Personal details
- Born: Matthew N. Latimer Flint, Michigan, U.S.
- Party: Republican
- Education: University of Michigan (BA, JD); Columbia University (MA)

Matthew N. Latimer is an American attorney, businessman, and former political speechwriter. Latimer is a founding partner of Javelin, a literary and creative agency located in Alexandria, Virginia, that offers representation, digital, and public relations services. He also served in a variety of appointments during George W. Bush administration.

== Early life and education ==
Latimer was born and raised in Flint, Michigan. His parents were both educators. He earned a Bachelor of Arts from the University of Michigan, Master of Arts from the Columbia University Graduate School of Journalism, and a Juris Doctor from the University of Michigan Law School.

== Career ==
Latimer began his career as a Special Assistant to Senator Spencer Abraham, (R-MI). During his serving working Abraham's office, Latimer was a coworker of Ann Coulter. He then served as Press Secretary to U.S. Rep Nick Smith (R-MI) before moving on to become a spokesman for Senator Jon Kyl (R-AZ) from 2001 to 2004. He then became a speechwriter for Donald Rumsfeld at the Department of Defense.

In 2006, Latimer was identified by the Washington Post as "director of the Pentagon writers group" and as the principal author of a 2006 Department of Defense document entitled "Ten facts about Guantanamo".

On March 20, 2007, President George W. Bush announced the appointment of Latimer as Special Assistant to the President for Speechwriting. Latimer resigned in October 2008.

In September 2009, GQ magazine's October edition published lengthy excerpts from Latimer's book about his time as Bush's speechwriter, Speech-Less: Tales of a White House Survivor. Titled "Me Talk Presidential One Day", the article recounts Latimer's befuddlement at what he saw as incompetent and uninformed decision-making during the economic crisis of 2008 on the part of Bush and Bush's staff, particularly Secretary of the Treasury Hank Paulson. The book cites Latimer's interpretations of Bush's remarks and comments made to his staff about political figures such as Nancy Pelosi, Hillary Clinton, John McCain, Barack Obama, Joe Biden and Sarah Palin.

In a September 22, 2009 Wall Street Journal op-ed titled "When Speechwriters Kiss and Tell," Latimer's former White House boss, William McGurn, questions Latimer's motives and challenges many of the claims made in the book.

After leaving the Bush administration, Latimer has worked as a literary agent and co-founded Javelin, a literary and creative agency. Latimer worked as the agent for the anonymous author of a Trump administration insider's exposé, A Warning, released in November 2019.

== Personal life ==
Latimer married Anna (née Sproul) in 2012. Sproul is a literary agent and graduate of Columbia University and the University of Oxford.
