= Nassau Interim Finance Authority =

New York State public-benefit corporation

Authority overview
- Formed: 2000
- Jurisdiction: Fiscal stability of Nassau County, New York
- Headquarters: 1305 Franklin Avenue, Suite 302 Garden City, New York 11530
- Authority executives: Evan Cohen, Executive Director; Richard Kessel, Chair & Director
- Website: nifa.ny.gov

The Nassau Interim Finance Authority is a New York State public-benefit corporation created to assist Nassau County, a suburban county adjacent to the city of New York on Long Island, emerge from a financial and debt crisis that began in the late 1990s. As of the start of 2022, NIFA, as it is known, was still in place and still supervising Nassau's finances under a control period that resumed in 2011 after a three-year hiatus.

== Organization ==
NIFA is guided by a seven-member board appointed by the Governor of New York, with one member recommended by the Senate Majority Leader, one by the Assembly Speaker, and one by the State Comptroller. Its management team is headed by Evan Cohen, who serves as executive director. According to its 2020 annual report, NIFA had G&A expenses in 2020 of $1.834 million. It listed a staff of five persons.

== History ==
Though the U.S. federal government was in surplus at the end of the Clinton administration, the Republican Party-led Nassau County government faced possible insolvency by 2000. The signs of the crisis began in 1999 and led that year to the Democratic Party taking control of the county legislature, in a previously solid Republican county. Among the many reasons cited for the situation the county found itself in were excessive union contracts to attract county government worker support for the Republican Party; a refusal by the Republican county executive Thomas Gulotta to raise taxes; and an increase in borrowing to close the gap, particularly for the purpose of paying an increasing number of property assessment appeals coming out of an assessment system that relied on outdated data.

=== NIFA and the Gulotta administration ===
Gulotta, a Republican, had proposed a tax increase in the early 1990s, and was almost defeated by North Hempstead Supervisor Benjamin Zwirn in 1993. Gulotta resisted further tax increases for the rest of his time in office, and was re-elected in 1997. Two years later, the county's finances began to implode. The first chairman of NIFA, Frank Zarb, said in a retrospective that bankruptcy was a "real possibility." In June 2000, Republican Governor George Pataki signed the legislation creating NIFA. As part of the introduction of NIFA, the state made payments to Nassau County of $105 million over five years.

=== NIFA and the Suozzi administration ===
Gulotta did not stand for re-election in 2001. When Nassau County's Conservative Party endorsed money market specialist Bruce Bent as its candidate, the Republicans endorsed Bent as well. Bent was defeated by then Glen Cove Mayor Thomas Suozzi. The county's financial situation had led the outgoing Gulotta administration to implement a 9.1% property tax increase in the 2002 budget, and Suozzi's first budget had a property tax increase of almost 20%. His final budget before he was defeated for re-election in 2009, by County Legislator Ed Mangano, had a 3.9% increase. There were no other county property tax increases in Suozzi's two terms though the total increased taxes levied by Suozzi during his tenure became a campaign issue during his successful run for Congress in 2016. Suozzi dealt with a NIFA control board for much of his eight years in office, though the control period ended in 2008. But NIFA remained in existence even after the end of the control period and continued to monitor county finances.

=== NIFA and the Mangano administration ===
After Mangano was sworn in as county executive in 2010 following his victory over Suozzi, he and the county legislature eliminated a home energy tax. That act reduced tax to the revenues county budget, and about a year after Mangano was sworn in, NIFA re-instituted a control period. A lawsuit by Nassau County contesting the legitimacy of the control board was unsuccessful, and NIFA articulated the limits of its duties and the budgetary reasons for a control board, in a statement. Prior to that court decision, the Republican leader in the county legislature, Peter Schmitt, appeared to liken the bipartisan members of NIFA to a Mafia family.

The Mangano-NIFA relationship, with a control board in place, was marked by almost annual disputes over the budgets that Mangano submitted and the county legislature approved. A 2013 agreement between the police officers’ union and the county was criticized by NIFA. A multi-year plan submitted by the Mangano administration in 2015 was rejected by NIFA. NIFA implemented a wage freeze in 2011, though it was lifted over several years. NIFA rejected the county's 2016 budget, and implemented a quarterly review. In December 2017, NIFA ordered specific spending cuts after finding additional flaws in Mangano's budget.

Jon Kaiman, who at the time was supervisor of the town of North Hempstead, was appointed by Governor Andrew Cuomo to be chairman of NIFA in 2013. Kaiman resigned in 2016 to run an unsuccessful effort to become the Democratic nominee for an open House seat. He was succeeded by banker Adam Barsky.

=== NIFA and the Curran administration ===
As 2018 began, Mangano was out of office, having chosen not to seek-re-election to a third term in 2017 following his indictment on 2016 on federal corruption charges. (He was ultimately convicted.) The two contenders for his position, Republican Jack Martins, a former State Senator and unsuccessful U.S. House of Representatives candidate a year earlier against Suozzi, and Democrat Laura Curran, a former newspaper reporter for the New York Daily News and a county legislator, both said during the campaign that steps must be taken to bring Nassau out from NIFA oversight. Curran won the election, and NIFA issued a deadline to offer any significant changes to the Mangano 2018 budget, the one with the NIFA-ordered cuts. Her selection of Mark Page as her chief budget officer was praised by NIFA chairman Adam Barsky, and Page had worked as a consultant to NIFA so was expected to understand its workings.

In April 2018, Curran presented her first budget to NIFA and made a rare public appearance before the members. At that meeting, the "conundrum" that Curran faced, with a Republican legislative majority rejecting her plan to hike fees to help close the budget gap, was discussed.

In one of the first significant actions under the Curran administration, NIFA in July 2018 overwhelmingly rejected a Curran administration request to borrow funds to pay for an earlier court judgement that went against the county for the wrongful conviction of two men. At the meeting where the vote was held, a report was discussed that talked about the country's "growing risks" in its budget.

In October 2018, NIFA warned that Nassau County's deficit for 2019 could be $59 million, though that was the lowest estimate since 2014. In a pointed critique, NIFA also noted the continuing situation where almost 20 years after NIFA was created, Nassau had still not taken the steps to end its oversight. "“Other municipalities with fewer resources, such as Buffalo, Washington, D.C., and Detroit, have moved beyond the tight control of their oversight monitors and it seems incongruous that Nassau County, one of the wealthiest counties in the Country, is unable to do the same,” NIFA wrote in its report on the deficit estimate.

In November 2018, NIFA approved the first budget of the Curran administration. The approval was unanimous. The budget did include $100 million in borrowing solely to pay back tax grievances. However, NIFA chairman Adam Barsky said "We always have concerns, but I think the concern over this budget is less severe, less concerning than prior budgets."

The sometimes-uncomfortable position that NIFA could find itself in relative to the county was evident in December 2018 when NIFA hired an outside attorney to sit in on county negotiations with its labor unions. NIFA hired the same individual that the county legislature had rejected just a few months earlier, raising questions about whether its "seat at the table" was proper or an unauthorized expansion of its role in day-to-day operations. Critics called the move an "end-run" around the legislature's rejection, which had been proposed by Curran.

NIFA's chairman Barsky got additional powers in March 2019 when he was granted "pre-approval" authority to sign off on labor agreements the county reaches, though the full NIFA board must ultimately accept the contract.

In early April, local newspaper Newsday wrote a story questioning whether NIFA was treating Curran with a softer approach than Mangano. Republicans charged NIFA had been tougher on Mangano, and cited Curran's tardiness in filing various reports with NIFA—which Mangano filed on time—and the muted response from NIFA. Barsky denied the allegations. Soon after that, NIFA rejected half of the county's borrowing requests that needed to go through NIFA because adequate notice had not been given to the full NIFA board.

In February 2020, NIFA took control of the finances of the Nassau University Medical Center, saying its perilous finances posed a "material threat" to Nassau County, given the county's backing of the financially troubled hospital.

In June 2020, NIFA approved the use of Goldman Sachs as the financial advisor on any new borrowing the county might need to undertake as a result of the pandemic.

By a 4-1 vote, NIFA approved the county budget for 2021 in mid-December 2020. However, noting the difficult economic times, NIFA said in its approval message that the county would need to develop a plan by March 31, 2021, to be updated regularly, on dealing with projections of future deficits. The budget approved by the county and NIFA did include NIFA borrowing long-term to help the county recover from the revenue shortfall created by the pandemic. (See below for more discussion on NIFA and the pandemic.)

A NIFA report in April 2021 on the county's financial performance in the prior year reported at $43.3 million surplus fueled both by federal pandemic aid and the refinancing of longer-term debt, a deal that Newsday columnist Joye Browne called "the mother of all one-shots.". But in releasing the report, NIFA chairman Barsky said the county had not eliminated its structural deficit and that it still faced long-term financial issues.

The rejection by the Nassau Patrolman's Benevolent Association of a contract offer led to NIFA chairman Barsky declaring in February 2021 that the union was "barking up the wrong tree" if it believed the rejection was going to lead to a better deal. NIFA would need to approve any deal.

Strengthening county finances due to several different factors did lead to renewed discussion in fall 2021 whether NIFA needed to continue either the control period, or even its existence. As Newsday noted at the time, there also were questions about who was going to continue serving on NIFA itself.

In October 2021, NIFA weighed in on what amounted to a battle of dueling tax cuts proposed by both Republicans and Democrats prior to the 2021 election. It said that a package of Republican cuts in fees and a boost in its sales tax revenue would throw the 2022 budget "out of balance." But it also said a Curran plan to cut $70 million in property taxes would "jeopardize" the budget as well. Those Republican amendments passed the legislature but were vetoed by Curran. The budget was passed with the Curran tax cuts in place, but needs NIFA approval.

On Election Day 2021, Curran suffered a shocking loss in her attempt to be re-elected, falling to Republican candidate Bruce Blakeman.

In December, NIFA approved the final Curran budget by a vote of 5-0. At the vote, NIFA executive director Evan Cohen said the Curran budget, approved by the legislature, had a potential shortfall of $39 million but had the lowest risks of any budget in several years.

=== NIFA and the pandemic ===
The prospect of NIFA staying with oversight over Nassau until 2051 was raised by Newsday in July 2020, given the huge deficit created by the pandemic and NIFA's ability to borrow money on a longer-term basis and at a lower interest rate.

Also in July 2020, NIFA approved the sale of $230 million in short-term funding as Nassau County looked to fill a revenue hole created by the pandemic.

In August 2020, Curran reversed course and proposed a financial plan that avoided longer-term borrowing through NIFA at least through 2020. Republicans had raised objection to such borrowing because the length of the term needed to get the best interest rate would mean that Nassau would not be able to end NIFA oversight for many years, since the bonds would be long-term.

Also in August, NIFA spelled out a dire situation for county finances, saying that "draconian" measures might be needed to rescue the county's finances in the wake of the pandemic, including significant layoffs and property tax increases.

As the start of the 2021 fiscal year neared, Curran proposed a budget that would have NIFA refinance $360 million in county and NIFA debt. Initial Republican opposition to the plan was based in part on the fact that such a plan would extend NIFA control over the county's financial operations. Barsky said Curran's spending plan was "perhaps ... the most challenging budget the county has prepared in recent memory." In early October, the county legislature's Finance and Rules committee approved a "declaration of need" that asked NIFA to refinance county debt over a 15-year period. This would be for less duration than the 30-year refinancing that could have kept NIFA supervising county finances until 2051. After some Republican resistance, the county ultimately accepted a plan to have NIFA borrow funds to save Nassau money on its financing costs as it sought to recover from the pandemic, raising the prospect that the agency will be part of the governance of the county for at least 35 years from its inception, since it would be until 2035 or so that the debt would mature.

The financing went through in an oversubscribed bond sale in February 2021. Approximately $1.1 billion in NIFA-backed bonds were sold out in less than two hours. The interest rate on the debt was approximately 1.3%. The debt taken on was not new debt but rather a restructuring. It saved the county approximately $435 million in debt service over the life of the 15-year bonds. The savings were enough that the expected hole in the county's budget as a result of the pandemic was effectively closed.

The bonds carried a triple A rating from Fitch. It does keep NIFA in the picture until 2035.

=== NIFA and the Blakeman administration ===
In an interview Newsday conducted with Blakeman a few days after Election Day 2021, Adam Barsky, the chairman of NIFA, said he would work with Blakeman. "the same way I worked with Ed Mangano and Laura Curran, with a lot of respect." Barsky said the county was in "relatively good shape based on one-time resources, which are from the federal (pandemic) aid." He also referred to the large refinancing conducted by NIFA under the Curran administration as having put Nassau on more solid ground. "The question is how to use those funds to provide long-term structural balance to the budget," he was quoted as saying. "Utilizing the short-term resources for long-term expenses that will go on indefinitely will only dig the county into a deeper hole."

In the November 8 issue of The Point, Newsday's daily politics newsletter, the question was raised how Blakeman and NIFA might work together. The article noted how the prior Republican county executive, Ed Mangano, joined with the county legislature in 2010 to end a home heating tax and blow a $40 million hole in the budget in the process. Given the extensive cuts in revenue that the Nassau Republicans promised during the 2021 election, which had just been completed at the time of the newsletter's publication, NIFA's Barsky raised the question of whether a similar scenario might play out next year. "We need to hear from the legislature and Bruce Blakeman and see what they plan to do," Barsky said.

The newsletter article also noted that NIFA was two seats short of being at its full lineup of seven members. However, by early March Newsday reported that the full contingent of members had been appointed.

In December, when NIFA approved the 2022 budget, the final one of Curran's tenure, Barsky addressed the fact that Republicans in the election had promised large cuts in fees and taxes. Barsky said he has spoken with both Blakeman and legislative presiding officer Richard Nicolello about whether Republicans would try to enact the fee cuts in 2022. As quoted by Newsday, Barsky said, "Neither has committed to do one thing or another as of yet. I did explain to both of them that it really doesn't matter, because after we approve the budget, if there are things that take place post-budget that put the county out of balance, then NIFA will expect and require them to make necessary adjustments to account for whatever the change is. Whatever it is, if it puts a hole in the budget they're expected to fix that hole."

A potential early sign of conflict between Blakeman and NIFA came in March 2022. Newsday reported that Blakeman and municipal unions were near an agreement on a long-standing issue regarding longevity pay. NIFA would need to approve such a deal, but NIFA officials told Newsday they had not been contacted by the Blakeman administration regarding the potential agreement.

The 2022-2023 state budget included a provision that will require NIFA to audit Nassau's Off-Track Betting Corp., its industrial development authority and the Nassau University Medical Center, which are all controlled by the Blakeman administration. In a meeting with the Newsday editorial board, Barsky said NIFA would look at having the state's comptroller, Thomas DiNapoli, conduct the audit and that he preferred NIFA not become a "political tool," accortding to Newsday. The April 12 article in Newsday's daily political newsletter, The Point, also suggested that Blakeman was moving the Republicans back to a more adversarial position, making NIFA the "boogeyman." Barsky said federal COVID money and a surge in sales tax revenue had been akin to a lottery win by Nassau, but that he believed the county was still under a structural deficit.

In August 2022, NIFA chairman Barsky sent a letter to County Executive Blakeman with several questions about his plans for the county's financial future. As Newsday's column on local politics The Point noted, with the county finances strengthening, there has been a push to end the NIFA control period that has been in effect since 2011. Among the questions asked by Barsky were about the county's payments to the troubled Nassau County University Medical Center, union negotiations, the assessment system and several other liabilities. At the time of the Newsday article, there had been no response from Blakeman.

The discussion in The Point newsletter followed a Newsday editorial that said while the end of the control period had some justification, there were other steps needed to be taken by the county to justify such a change.

== Credit rating ==
In August 2020, Fitch Ratings gave NIFA a AAA rating on approximately $400 million in sales tax-backed debt. In early November 2020 Fitch Ratings Service gave NIFA a short-term credit rating of F1 on an issue of variable rate bonds backed by the county's sales tax. That is Fitch's second-highest short-term credit rating. The AAA rating was affirmed in January 2021 when Fitch rated several new debt issuances.

Moody's has had an Aa1 credit rating on NIFA since at least 2015. That is the second-highest level in its schedule of ratings.

== See also ==
- Buffalo Fiscal Stability Authority
- Development Authority of the North Country
- Erie County Fiscal Stability Authority
- Lower Manhattan Development Corporation
- Municipal Assistance Corporation for the City of NY
- New York State Housing Finance Agency
- State of New York Municipal Bond Bank Agency
