= Tobacco Settlement Financing Corporation =

New York public benefit corporation

The Tobacco Settlement Financing Corporation is a New York State public-benefit corporation that is administered by New York State Homes and Community Renewal. It used to be a subsidiary to the State of New York Municipal Bond Bank Agency. The Tobacco Settlement Financing Corporation was created as a separate legal subsidiary of the New York State Municipal Bond Bank Agency to securitize a portion of the State's future revenues from its share of the 1998 Master Settlement with the participating cigarette manufacturers in order to make a $4.2 billion payment to State's General Fund. During calendar year 2003, the Tobacco Settlement Financing Corporation issued bonds and remitted the $4.2 billion payment to the State. In 2017, it had operating expenses of $2.94 million, no outstanding debt, and a staffing level of 267 people.

== See also ==
- Empire State Development Corporation
- New York Local Government Assistance Corporation
- New York State Housing Finance Agency
