= New York Local Government Assistance Corporation =

The New York Local Government Assistance Corporation is a New York state public-benefit corporation created in 1990 to issue bonds to decrease the state's reliance on short term loans.

== Organization ==
Until January 13, 2006, the Local Government Assistance Corporation had a three-member board of directors. The number was increased to seven in 2006. According to the New York State Authorities Budget Office, the Local Government Assistance Corporation had an operating budget of $3 million in 2017 with a staff of 24 people.

== Bond issuances ==
The Local Government Assistance Corporation has not issued any new bonds since the 1993-94 fiscal year. As of March 31, 2018, there was $1.758 billion in debt outstanding.

== Controversy ==
There is ongoing debate in New York State politics regarding the size and scope of New York State public benefit corporations, i.e., how many there are, how much debt they carry, how much power they wield to issue bonds for funding, who they are accountable to, etc. For example, the New York Local Government Assistance Corporation has a 24-member staff to oversee the operations of an organization that no longer serves a purpose, according to the New York State Comptroller's office, other than to reduce its outstanding debt.

== See also ==
- Empire State Development Corporation
- Municipal Assistance Corporation
- Tobacco Settlement Financing Corporation
