= Municipal Assistance Corporation =

New York State public benefit corporation

A Municipal Assistance Corporation (MAC) was an independent New York State public-benefit corporation created by the State of New York for purposes of providing financing assistance and fiscal oversight of a fiscally-distressed city. Two MACs are explicitly designated under New York law.

Best known is the MAC created for New York City during the 1975 New York City fiscal crisis. The corporation was born of a recommendation made by a special panel composed of Simon H. Rifkind, Felix G. Rohatyn, Richard M. Shinn, George D. Gould, and Donald B. Smiley. The majority of appointees to the corporation’s board were made by the governor, initially by New York governor Hugh Carey. Members of the MAC included Donna Shalala, later the United States secretary of health and human services. As part of the creation of MAC, the state passed legislation that converted the city’s sales and stock transfer taxes into state taxes. In 2008, having sold almost $10 billion in bonds to keep the city solvent through its worst fiscal crisis, MAC settled its final accounts and voted itself out of existence.

The other MAC was created on July 19, 1995 for the City of Troy, which was later terminated on June 27, 2023 after its debt was paid off.

== See also ==
- Buffalo Fiscal Stability Authority
- Development Authority of the North Country
- Education Achievement Authority
- Empire State Development Corporation
- Erie County Fiscal Stability Authority
- Financial emergency in Michigan
- Lower Manhattan Development Corporation
- New York Local Government Assistance Corporation
- State of New York Municipal Bond Bank Agency
