= Licensed to Kill? =

1998 book by Joan Aron

Licensed to Kill? The Nuclear Regulatory Commission and the Shoreham Power Plant
- Author: Joan Aron
- Language: English
- Genre: Non-fiction
- Publication date: 1998

Licensed to Kill? The Nuclear Regulatory Commission and the Shoreham Power Plant, a 1998 book by Joan Aron, presents the first detailed case study of how an activist public and elected officials of New York state opposed the Shoreham Nuclear Power Plant on Long Island. The book explains that nuclear power faltered when "public concerns about health, safety, and the environment superseded other interests about national security or energy supplies".

Aron argues that the Shoreham closure resulted from the collapse of public trust for the Nuclear Regulatory Commission and the entire nuclear industry. For Aron, the unwillingness of the Long Island Lighting Company (LILCO) management to consider true public interest in the debate resulted in "the loss of the goodwill of its customers". Also, the willingness of LILCO to press on with plans for Shoreham despite changes in the economics of nuclear power and market demand "reflected a basic failure of foresight".

== See also ==
- Anti-nuclear movement in the United States
- List of anti-nuclear protests in the United States
- List of books about nuclear issues
- Richard Kessel
