= Lower Manhattan Development Corporation =

American organization (2001-present)

- Type: Subsidiary
- Founded: November 2001; 24 years ago
- Parent: Empire State Development Corporation
- Website: renewnyc.com

The Lower Manhattan Development Corporation was formed in November 2001, following the September 11 attacks, to plan the reconstruction of Lower Manhattan and distribute nearly $10 billion in federal funds aimed at rebuilding downtown Manhattan. It is a subsidiary of the Empire State Development Corporation, which is a New York state public-benefit corporation.

== History ==
The Lower Manhattan Development Corporation was formed in November 2001 by then-governor George Pataki and then-mayor Rudolph Giuliani. The LMDC is a joint State-City corporation governed by a 16-member Board of Directors, half appointed by the governor of New York and half by the mayor of New York. As a result, Pataki and Giuliani appointees dominate the LMDC. Its original chairman was John C. Whitehead, a former Deputy Secretary of State and head of Goldman Sachs. One of its first projects was the granting of more than $40 million for parks and green space.

In February 2003, the LMDC chose Daniel Libeskind's master plan for the reconstruction of the World Trade Center complex. The organization also sponsored the international design competition for the World Trade Center Memorial, which resulted in Michael Arad and Peter Walker's Reflecting Absence being chosen as the winning design in January 2004.

Having distributed its funds, the LMDC in July 2006 announced plans to dissolve and transfer its responsibilities to other existing agencies and foundations, including the W.T.C. Memorial Foundation, and the Lower Manhattan Construction Command Center. However a settlement following the fire at the Deutsche Bank Building allowed them funding for future projects including the West Thames Street pedestrian bridge.

In 2023, LMDC announced plans for the final wind down in early 2024 after years of discussion and staff cuts. It will remain in existence as a conduit for grants, however, including for the PAC NYC, and waterfront rehabilitation efforts.

== Organization structure ==
LMDC does not own the World Trade Center site although it partners with the Port Authority on some elements of development.

=== Funding ===
The LMDC was funded through the disbursement of Community Development Block Grants-amounting to $2.783 billion—approved by the federal government in the aftermath of the 9/11 attacks and resultant destruction of much of lower Manhattan's economic and structural base. It was not listed in the New York State Authorities Budget Office's 2018 annual report, but remains in operation as of 2019 as plans for the future 5 World Trade Center continued to develop.

== Criticism ==
Two members of the LMDC's board have asserted that up to $45 million allocated to the LMDC from a "community enhancement" fund in May 2005 has not been directly accounted for, and that up to $15 million from that stipend might have been spent in areas other than those it had been explicitly stipulated for.

Former attorney general Eliot Spitzer became governor in 2007, rethought his condemnation, and announced a "reinvigorated LMDC" that would continue the revitalization of Lower Manhattan. Mayor Bloomberg welcomed the Governor's renewed interest at the time. However, in September 2008, Mayor Bloomberg condemned the LMDC as a contributor to a slower progress in rebuilding and he demanded dissolution of the LMDC.

== See also ==
- Buffalo Fiscal Stability Authority
- Development Authority of the North Country
- Economy of New York City
- Erie County Fiscal Stability Authority
- Municipal Assistance Corporation for the City of NY
- New York State Housing Finance Agency
- State of New York Municipal Bond Bank Agency
- United Nations Development Corporation
