= Everyman Espresso =

New York City coffeehouse chain

Coordinates: 40.72146°N 74.00435°W

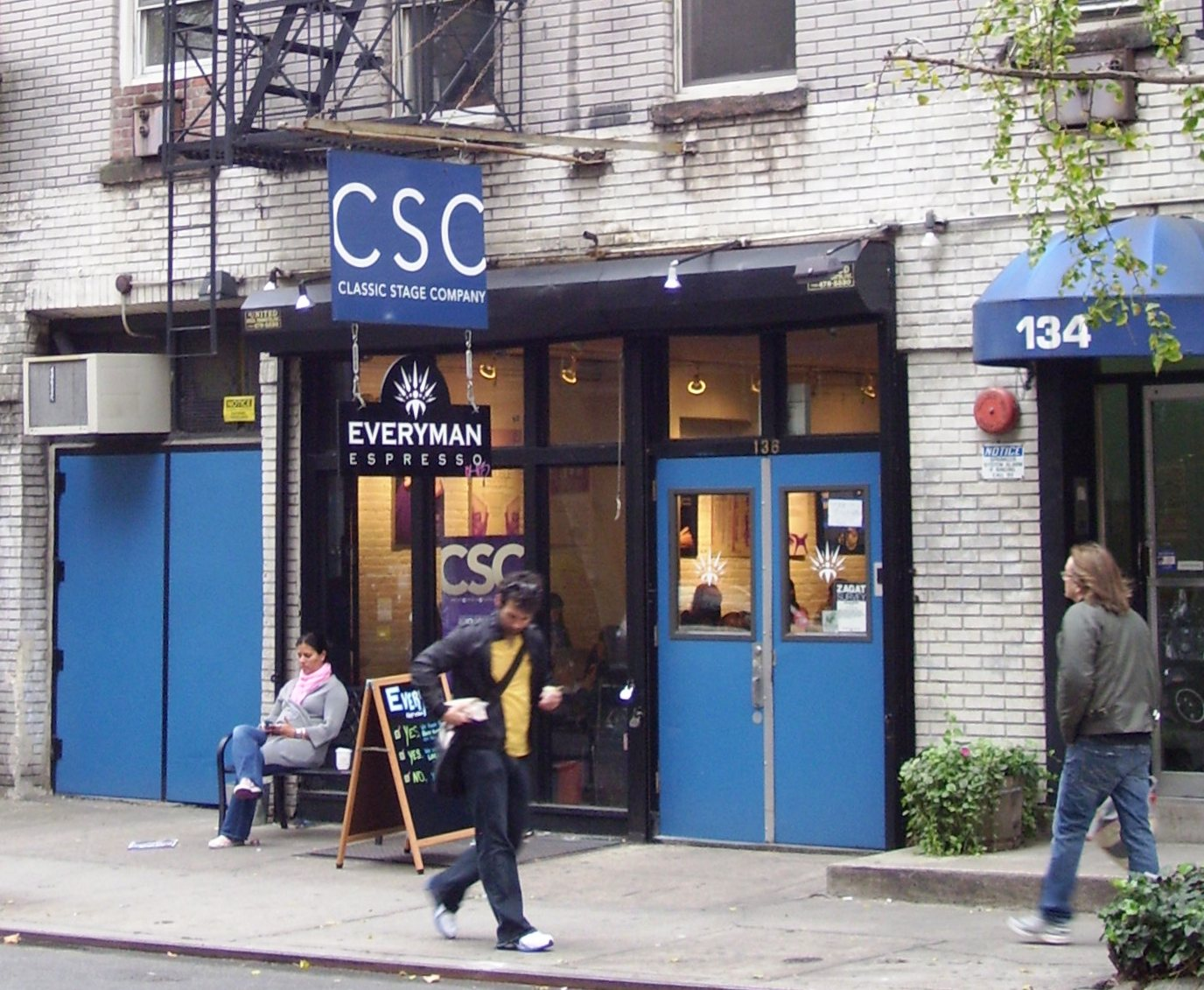
original location of Everyman Espresso

Everyman Espresso is a chain of coffeehouses in New York City.

== Locations ==
The original location shares its space with the Classic Stage Company in Union Square. Another location is in SoHo.

== Logo ==
Owner Penix has a tattoo which reads, I (picture of coffee cup) NY. Penix made a sign to advertise Everyman Espresso modeled after his tattoo. The Empire State Development Corporation represented by CMG Worldwide claimed that this was a trademark violation of their I (heart) NY graphic, asked for Everyman Espresso to remove the graphic, and requested a cut of all money made for violating their logo.

== Reviews ==
Some reviews of the coffee at Everyman Espresso have been positive.

Owner Sam Penix is one of New York City's best known baristas. He is from Florida.
