= Public benefit corporation (disambiguation) =

Public-benefit corporation may refer to several types of corporate entity:

== United Kingdom ==
- Public benefit corporation, the legal form of NHS foundation trust

== United States ==
- Benefit corporation or public-benefit corporation, for profit but with positive impact
- Public-benefit nonprofit corporation, chartered by a state government
- New York state public-benefit corporations, quasi-governmental authorities
