= East Shoreham, New York =

- Hamlet and census-designated place
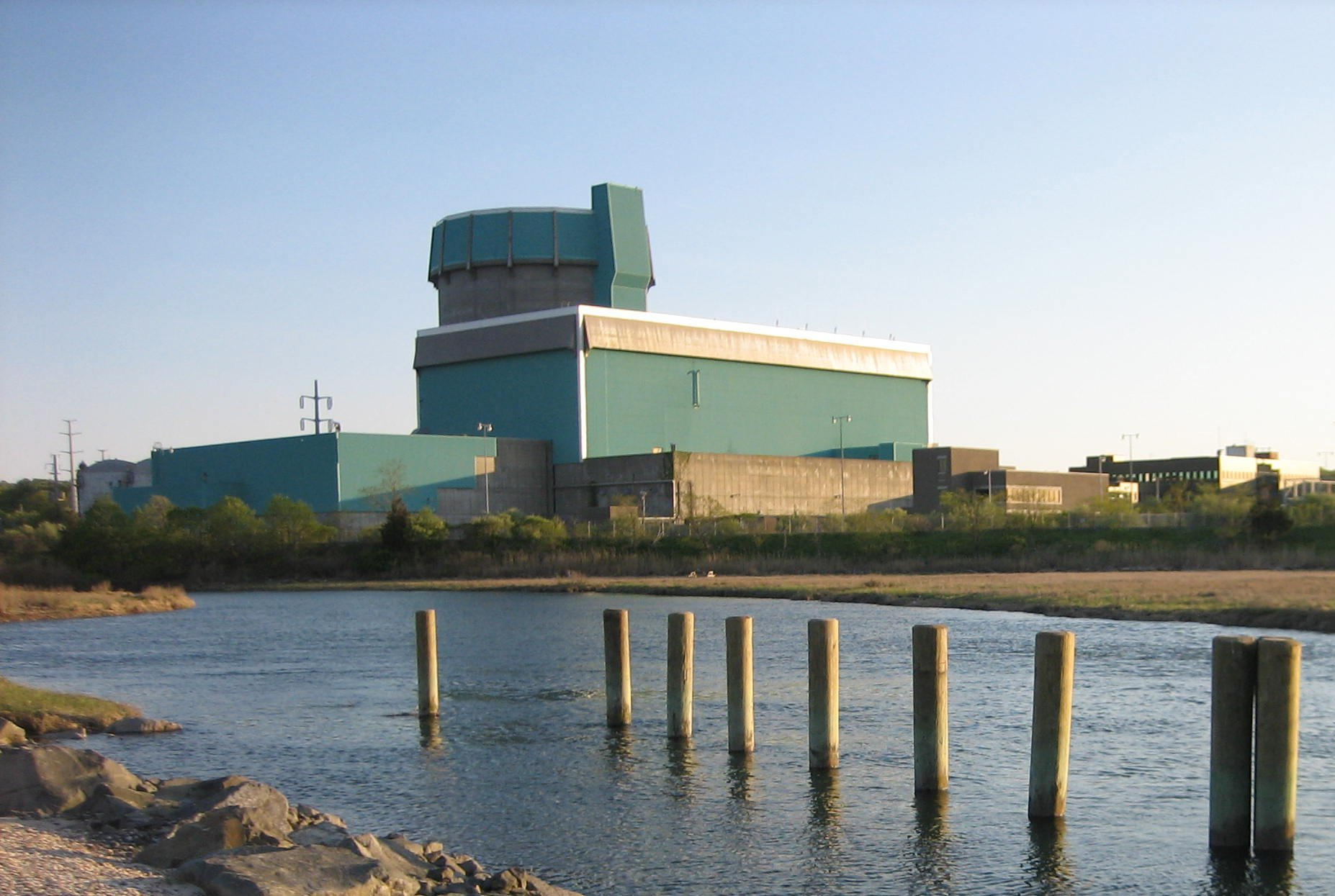
- Shoreham Nuclear Power Plant

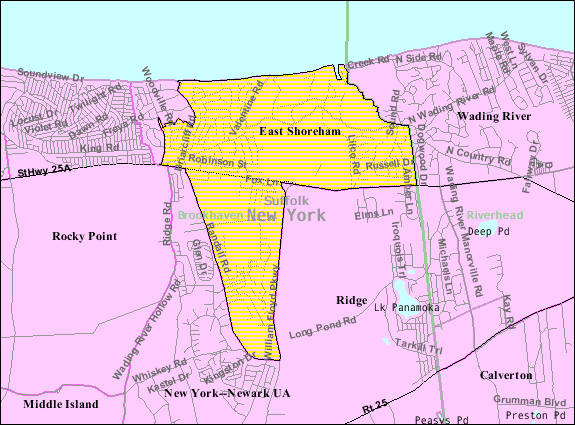
- U.S. Census map

- Location within the state of New York
- Coordinates: 40°57′1″N 72°53′7″W
- Country: United States
- State: New York
- County: Suffolk

Area
  - Total: 6.71 sq mi (17.37 km^{2})
  - Land: 5.40 sq mi (13.98 km^{2})
  - Water: 1.31 sq mi (3.39 km^{2})
- Elevation: 121 ft (37 m)

Population (2020)
  - Total: 6,841
  - Density: 1,267/sq mi (489.2/km^{2})
- Time zone: UTC−05:00 (Eastern Time Zone)
  - Summer (DST): UTC−04:00
- ZIP Codes: 11786
- Area codes: 631, 934
- FIPS code: 36-22980
- GNIS feature ID: 1867403

East Shoreham is a hamlet and census-designated place (CDP) in the Suffolk County town of Brookhaven, New York, United States. The population was 6,841 at the 2020 census.

== History ==
Sited in East Shoreham, the Shoreham Nuclear Power Plant was approved for Shoreham in 1973, but it was later decommissioned as the result of public protest. The builder, Long Island Lighting Company (LILCO), was partially reimbursed for money spent on construction. The municipal bonds that were floated to reimburse the builder are being paid off by a special levy on the electric bills of residents of Long Island. In 2022, estimates calculated the debt had grown from just under $8 billion to over $9 billion – more than $8,000 per ratepayer.

== Geography ==
East Shoreham is located on the North Shore of Long Island, by Long Island Sound. It is approximately 100 km (70 miles) from New York City. According to the United States Census Bureau, the CDP has a total area of 13.9 square kilometres (5.4 sq mi), all land. East Shoreham and the adjoining village of Shoreham share a post office, which has 11786 as the zip code. Despite its official name, East Shoreham is invariably referred to by its inhabitants as "Shoreham", while the adjoining village is often called "Shoreham Village".

East Shoreham is bordered to the east by Wading River in the town of Riverhead, to the south by Ridge, to the southwest by Rocky Point, to the west by the village of Shoreham.

== Demographics ==
=== 2020 census ===
As of the 2020 census, East Shoreham had a population of 6,841. The median age was 42.6 years. 22.4% of residents were under the age of 18, and 15.5% were 65 years of age or older. For every 100 females there were 100.1 males, and for every 100 females age 18 and over there were 98.1 males age 18 and over.

93.3% of residents lived in urban areas, while 6.7% lived in rural areas.

There were 2,181 households in East Shoreham, of which 37.3% had children under the age of 18 living in them. Of all households, 72.2% were married-couple households, 10.2% were households with a male householder and no spouse or partner present, and 13.7% were households with a female householder and no spouse or partner present. About 12.1% of all households were made up of individuals and 6.2% had someone living alone who was 65 years of age or older.

There were 2,248 housing units, of which 3.0% were vacant. The homeowner vacancy rate was 1.2% and the rental vacancy rate was 5.4%.

Racial composition as of the 2020 census
Race	Number	Percent
White	5,813	85.0%
Black or African American	124	1.8%
American Indian and Alaska Native	12	0.2%
Asian	187	2.7%
Native Hawaiian and Other Pacific Islander	0	0.0%
Some other race	129	1.9%
Two or more races	576	8.4%
Hispanic or Latino (of any race)	647	9.5%

=== 2000 census ===
There were 1,787 households, of which 48.2% had children under the age of 18 living with them, 78.6% were married couples living together, 7.8% had a female householder with no husband present, and 11.1% were non-families. 9.0% of all households were made up of individuals, and 3.1% had someone living alone who was 65 years of age or older. The average household size was 3.20 and the average family size was 3.40.

29.9% of the population were under the age of 18, 7.0% from 18 to 24, 27.6% from 25 to 44, 28.0% from 45 to 64, and 7.5% who were 65 years of age or older. The median age was 37 years. For every 100 females, there were 100.0 males. For every 100 females age 18 and over, there were 95.9 males.

The median income was $85,916 and the median family income was $88,020. Males had a median income of $61,359 and females $35,536. The per capita income was $29,485. About 3.4% of families and 4.1% of the population were below the poverty threshold, including 2.3% of those under age 18 and 8.4% of those age 65 or over.

== Education ==
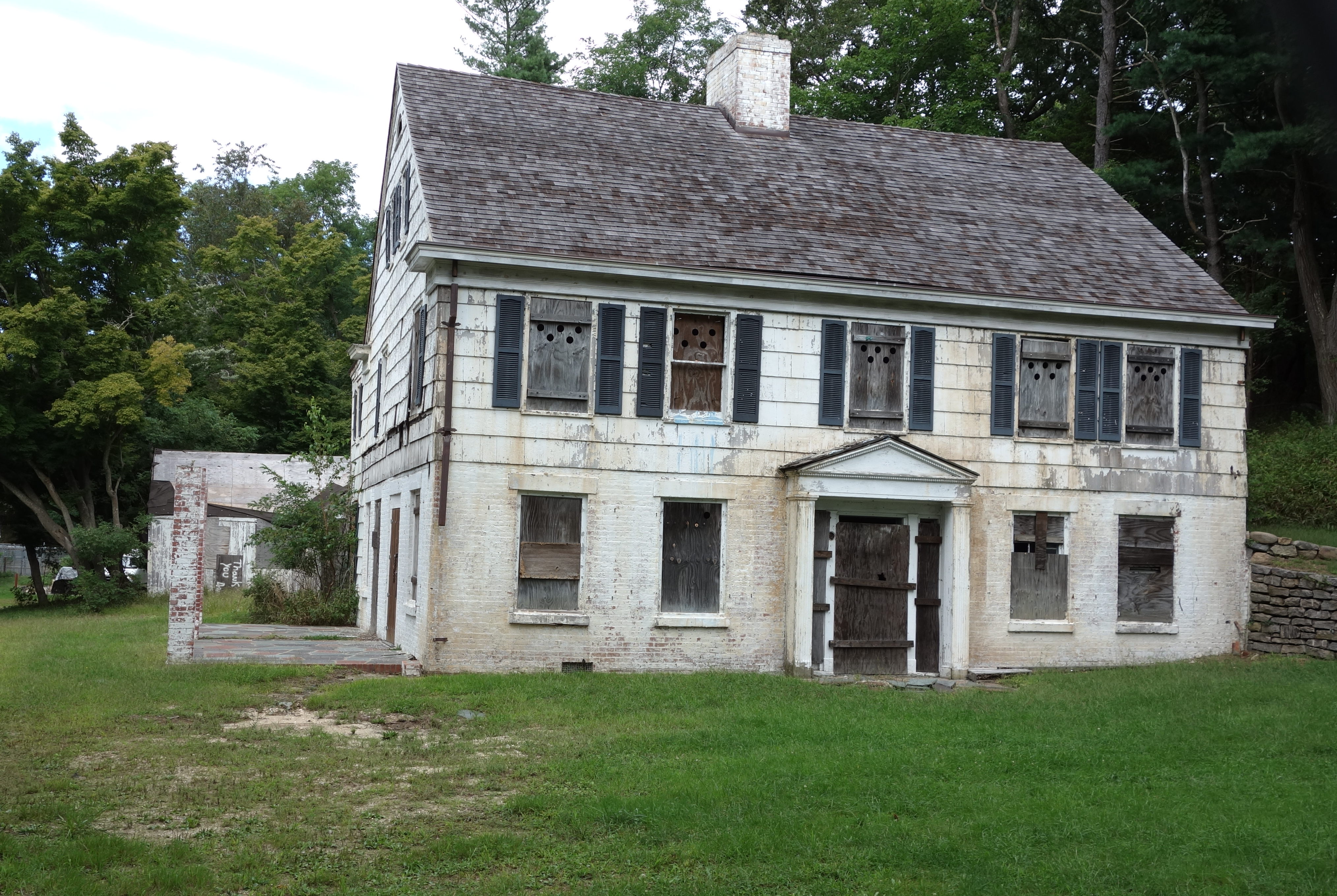
The Josiah Woodhull house, built in 1720, is the oldest house in the Shoreham area and was undergoing renovation in 2014

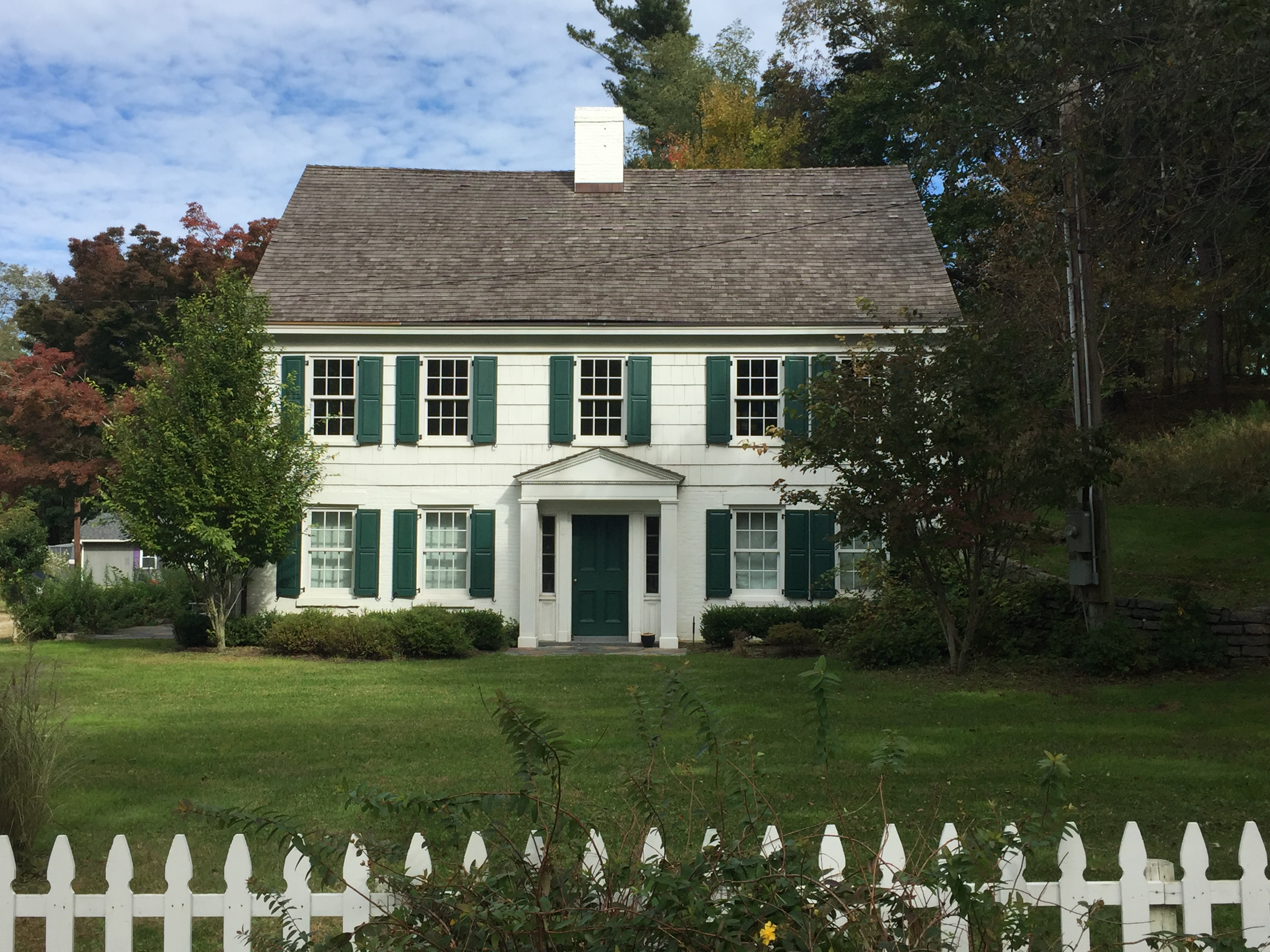
Josiah Woodhull House, after restoration.

Shoreham, East Shoreham and the neighboring hamlet of Wading River form the Shoreham-Wading River School District.

== Notable people ==
- Carter Rubin (born 2005), singer, winner of season 19 of NBC's The Voice
