= New York City School Construction Authority =

Government agency

- Type: New York state public-benefit corporations
- Founded: 1988; 38 years ago
- Headquarters: New York City
- Key people: Celeste A. Ramirez (President and Chief Executive Officer)
- Number of employees: 986 (FY 2026)
- Website: www.nycsca.org

The New York City School Construction Authority (SCA) manages the design, construction and renovation of school facilities in New York City.

The Authority is overseen by a three-member Board of Trustees appointed by the Mayor. To see the current board members, visit the Board of Trustees page on the SCA website.

== History ==
The School Construction Authority was created in 1988 as a New York State public-benefit corporation by the New York State Legislature, which removed control of capital projects from the city's Board of Education in an effort to end corruption. The School Construction Authority manages the Department of Education's Capital Plan and is solely accountable for planning, real estate, and budgeting, as well as the scoping, design and construction of new schools and additions, as well as capital improvements to existing schools.

== Criticism ==
=== Criticism of construction noise and treatment of neighbors ===
The SCA has often been criticized due to the noise produced by school construction projects in residential neighborhoods. This often occurs during the day, but also at evening and night when people are typically home from work. Residents have criticized the SCA for making it hard to sleep at night. In addition it is common for the SCA to do construction on the weekends, also when people are home. As a result, neighbors who live near school construction sites complain about the quality of life and it becomes difficult to sell homes near a school as they often become construction sites. In addition, SCA has been criticized for obstructing traffic on residential streets. These controversies have led to heated arguments between residents and construction workers. In late 2022 at PS 41Q in Bayside, a heated fight broke out between a disabled neighbor and construction workers with the disabled neighbor being wrongfully arrested.

=== Criticism of spending ===
There has also been criticism in regard to the amount of money being spent by the SCA on school expansions. The Board of Ed argues this needs to be done to ensure smaller class sizes, yet there is not evidence of expanded schools or new schools improving the quality of education for pupils.

== See also ==
- New York City Department of Education
