= New York State Financial Control Board =

The New York State Financial Control Board was created in 1975 by New York City to address its "historical financial crisis" and state bailout to oversee municipal spending. The board was created pursuant to the New York State Financial Emergency Act (FEA), and was initially known as the Emergency Financial Control Board (EFCB).

The mayor of New York City and the governor of New York State both serve on the seven-member board. The board consists of the Governor, the Mayor, the city and state Comptrollers, and three public members appointed by the Governor.

The board was made permanent by law in 1986. In 1987, with successful changes having been made to meet the mandatory conditions set out in the FEA, the city was no longer in a "control period" (meaning the FCB has power to approve/disapprove financial plans, contracts and borrowing). Every year the board must assess and determine whether an event has, or is likely to "trigger" the automatic re-imposition of a "control period". Three years later the word "Emergency" was removed from the group's name and its charter was extended for thirty years, set to expire in 2033. Despite the act being in effect until 2033, the imposition of a "control period" will sunset as expected.

The board continues to monitor the city's financial health.

== 1983 Hearing ==
Mayor Ed Koch testified at a hearing in October 1983, after repeated accusations of misusing state education funds, that "The City has to draw up a preliminary budget long before it gets state funds" and "The Financial Control Board does not allow the city to anticipate the state's allocation, so the city temporarily pays for education out of city money. Months later, the city repays its advance with state education funds" according to reporting by the New York Times at that time.

== See also ==
- New York State Authorities Budget Office
- New York State Comptroller
- New York State Public Authorities Control Board
