= New York State Public Authorities Control Board =

The New York State Public Authorities Control Board is composed of five members, appointed by the Governor, some upon the recommendation of members of the Legislature. The five members of PACB are appointed by the Governor to serve one-year terms, with one member representing the Governor and acting as the chairperson. The Governor appoints the four remaining members based upon the recommendations of the Majority and Minority leaders of the Legislature. The members appointed by the governor upon the recommendation of the Minority Leader of the Senate and the Minority Leader of the Assembly are non-voting members, but who may comment and their discussion is entered into the minutes of the Board.

New York's public services are heavily organized into public-benefit nonprofit corporations, known frequently as authorities or development corporations. New York State-chartered public benefit corporations exist all over the state, but the most famous examples are probably in New York City (the Metropolitan Transportation Authority and the Port Authority of New York and New Jersey).

The enabling statute provides that it "shall have the power and it shall be its duty to receive applications for approval of the financing and construction of any project proposed by [certain specified] state public benefit corporations."

Members may hold other state office, however, they may only be compensated "for actual and necessary expenses incurred in the performance of official duties."

== See also ==
- New York energy law
- New York State Authorities Budget Office
- New York State Comptroller
- New York State Financial Control Board
