= Shoreham Nuclear Power Plant =

Decommissioned nuclear power plant in New York

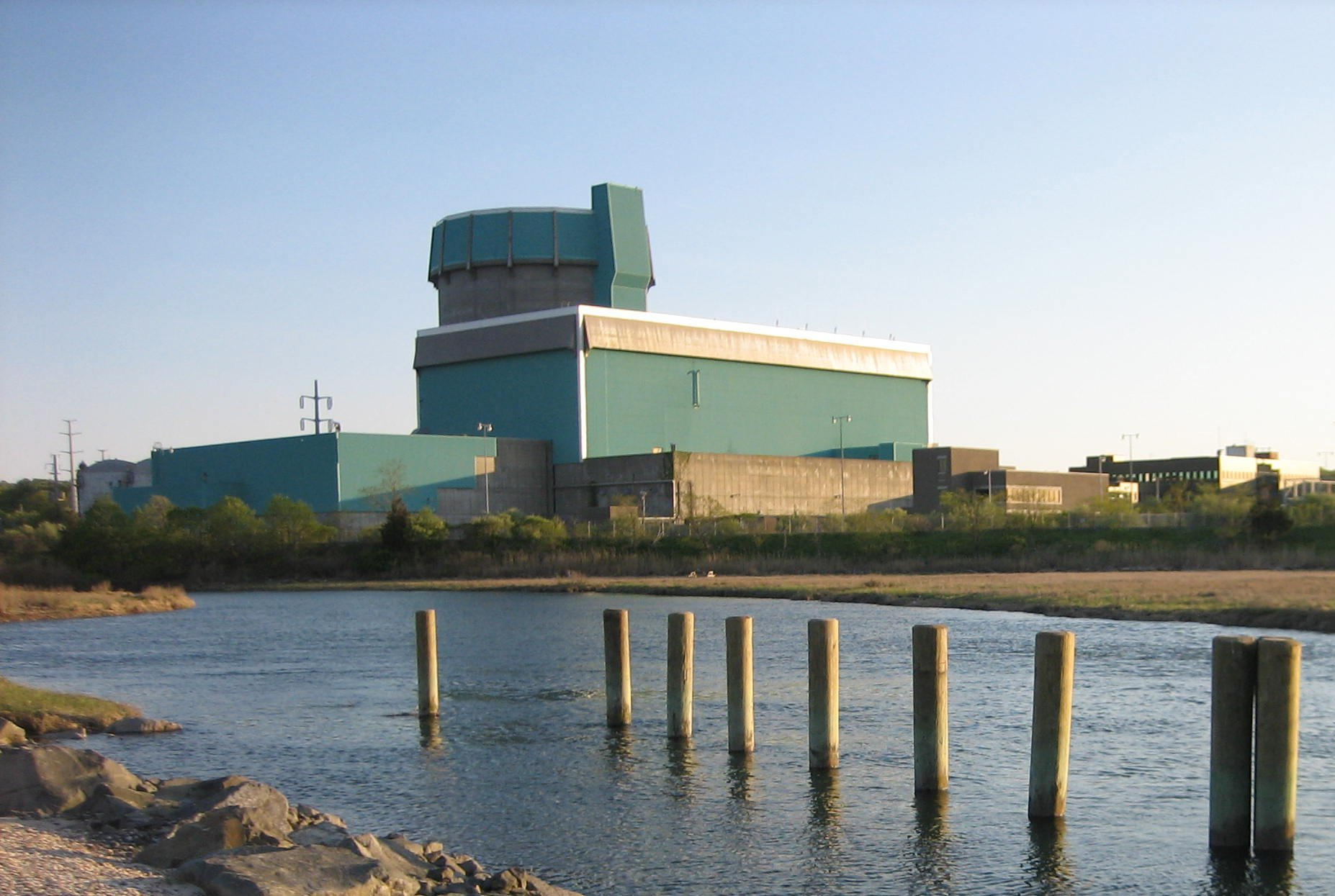
- Country: United States
- Location: East Shoreham, New York
- Coordinates: 40°57′40″N 72°51′54″W
- Status: Decommissioned
- Construction began: November 1, 1972
- Commission date: August 1, 1986
- Decommission date: May 1, 1989
- Construction cost: $6 Billion
- Operator: Long Island Lighting Company

Nuclear power station
- Reactor type: BWR

Power generation
- Units decommissioned: 820 MW

External links
- Commons: Related media on Commons

The Shoreham Nuclear Power Plant was a completed General Electric nuclear boiling water reactor located adjacent to Long Island Sound in East Shoreham, New York. Due to public opposition, it was decommissioned without entering operation.

The plant was built between 1973 and 1984 by the Long Island Lighting Company (LILCO). The plant faced considerable public opposition after the 1979 Three Mile Island accident and the 1986 Chernobyl disaster. There were large protests and two dozen local groups opposed the plant.

In 1983, Suffolk County determined that the county could not be safely evacuated in the event of a serious nuclear accident at the plant. Governor Mario Cuomo ordered state officials not to approve any LILCO-sponsored evacuation plan—effectively preventing the plant from operating at full capacity. The plant was completed in 1984 and in 1985 LILCO received federal permission for low-power (5 percent power) tests.

By 1989, it became apparent that not enough local communities would sign on to the evacuation plan for the plant ever to be able to open. On May 19, 1989, LILCO agreed not to operate the plant in a deal with the state under which most of the $6 billion cost of the unused plant was passed on to Long Island residents. In 1992, the Long Island Power Authority bought the plant from LILCO. The plant was fully decommissioned in 1994.

== Proposal ==
Long Island Lighting Company (LILCO) President John J. Tuohy announced plans for the plant on April 13, 1965, during a stockholder's meeting. The plant was to be the first commercial nuclear power plant to be constructed on Long Island, (Note: The Ravenswood Nuclear Power Plant was proposed in 1962 for the Ravenswood Generating Station site in Long Island City, but was cancelled in 1964) and initially had little formal opposition, as Brookhaven already had multiple research nuclear reactors at the Brookhaven National Laboratory, about 5 miles (8.0 km) south of Shoreham.

LILCO purchased a 455-acre (1.84 km^{2}) site in an area which was sparsely populated at the time. They announced the plant would produce 540 megawatts, cost between $65 and $75 million and would be online in 1973. At the time, demand for electricity was increasing more than 10 percent per year on Long Island and the Atomic Energy Commission was strongly pushing all power companies to use nuclear power.

In 1968, LILCO increased the size of the plant from 540 to 820 megawatts and announced plans to build two more reactors near Jamesport. Those reactors never got beyond the drawing board stage, but this helped delay and increase the costs of the plant.

In 1969, LILCO announced plans for a reactor at Lloyd Harbor in Huntington – closer to Manhattan in a more densely populated area. Following resident opposition, the proposal was dropped in 1970, setting the stage for opposition to any nuclear power plant on Long Island.

The plant was to be situated near the path of airplanes landing at MacArthur Airport and the New Haven Airport. It was also to be built in an area that the U.S. Air Force had designated as "high hazard" due to its proximity to the Naval Weapons Industrial Reserve Plant, Calverton, where Grumman military fighter planes were tested, which was five miles (8.0 km) from the Shoreham site. The Lloyd Harbor Study Group were concerned that a plane could crash into the plant, though studies suggest that an airliner impacting a containment structure would not destroy the structure or even cause sufficient damage to permit the escape of radioactive materials from the reactor core.

== Construction ==
The plant was built between 1973 and 1984, completed with a General Electric type 4 boiling water reactor using Mark II containment. Its location on Long Island Sound – near the mouth of the small stream that forms the border between Brookhaven and Riverhead towns – was largely rural at the time (although within 60 miles of Manhattan). Cost overruns caused its estimated final cost to approach $2 billion by the late 1970s, due to low worker productivity and design changes ordered by the NRC.

== Public opposition ==
The Sierra Club, the Audubon Society and environmentalist Barry Commoner opposed the issuance of a construction permit for the Shoreham plant. The plant drew considerable opposition after the 1979 Three Mile Island accident and the 1986 Chernobyl disaster, resulting in delays and cost increases before New York Governor Mario Cuomo ordered purchasing and decommissioning of the plant. The state would ultimately take over LILCO also.

The first small anti-Shoreham demonstration took place in June 1976. On June 3, 1979, following the Three Mile Island accident, 15,000 protesters gathered in the largest demonstration in Long Island history. 600 were arrested as they scaled the plant's fences.

LILCO's problems were compounded by NRC rules in the wake of Three Mile Island, requiring that operators of nuclear plants work out evacuation plans in cooperation with state and local governments. This prompted local politicians to join the growing opposition to the plant. Since any land evacuation off the island would involve traveling at least 60 miles (97 km) back through New York City to reach its bridges, local officials feared that the island could not be safely evacuated.

Nora Bredes, executive director of the Shoreham Opponents Coalition, was a primary organizer of the grass-roots campaign against Shoreham during the 1980s. She lobbied officials, organized advertising campaigns, wrote pamphlets, and planned rallies. Ms. Bredes drew together more than two dozen local opposition groups which included the Lloyd Harbor Study Group, the Farm Bureau, The Long Island Safe Energy Coalition and its newsletter Chain Reaction, Safe'n Sound with its Sound Times newspaper, and the S.H.A.D. Alliance (modeled on New Hampshire's Clamshell Alliance). According to a Newsday poll, in 1981, 43 percent of Long Islanders opposed the plant; by 1986, that number had risen to 74 percent.

== Closure ==
On February 17, 1983, the Suffolk County Legislature voted 15–1 in favor of a resolution stating that the county could not be safely evacuated in the event of an accident at Shoreham. The newly elected governor of New York, Mario Cuomo, then ordered state officials not to approve any LILCO-sponsored evacuation plan.

The plant was completed in 1984. In 1985 LILCO received federal permission for low-power 5 percent tests. Confidence in LILCO declined in 1985 when it took nearly two weeks to restore power to all of the island following Hurricane Gloria.

Between 1985 and 1989, as local communities continued to refuse to sign the necessary evacuation plan, LILCO proposed asking the U.S. Congress to approve a law for the evacuation — a move which went nowhere.

On February 28, 1989, Cuomo and LILCO announced a plan to decommission the plant, which involved the state taking over the plant and then attaching a 3 percent surcharge to Long Island electric bills for 30 years to pay off the $6 billion price tag. On May 19, 1989, LILCO agreed not to operate the plant in a deal with the state under which most of the $6 billion cost of the unused plant was passed along to Long Island residents. The Long Island Power Authority (LIPA), headed by Richard Kessel, was created in 1986 specifically to buy the plant from LILCO. In 1992, LIPA bought Shoreham from LILCO for the nominal sum of one dollar and closed it, making Shoreham the first commercial nuclear power plant in the US to be dismantled. The plant was fully decommissioned in 1994.

== Aftermath ==
It cost $186 million to decommission the reactor, with the radioactive materials license ending in May 1995. The low-pressure turbine rotors are currently in use at the Davis-Besse Nuclear Power Station. LILCO paid Philadelphia Electric Company $50 million to take its fuel to the Limerick Nuclear Power Plant.

In August 2002 a 100 MW Gas Turbine Power Plant was commissioned on the Shoreham site utilizing the existing switchgear that was in place for the decommissioned nuclear facility. This facility utilizes two 42 MW GE LM6000PC Jet Engine Generators equipped with Sprint injection (can increase capacity to 50 MW each) and Spray Mist Evaporative Cooling (SMEC). Its construction was part of a plan to build ten such plants across Long Island to avoid the risk of rolling blackouts in the face of increased demand like those experienced in California the previous year, given strain on the system from a heat wave in 2001.

The electric transmission infrastructure has remained, connecting it to the Long Island electric grid. In 2002 the Cross Sound Cable, a submarine power cable capable of transmitting 330 MW, was laid from the Shoreham plant across Long Island Sound to New Haven, Connecticut. During the Northeast Blackout of 2003 the cable was used to ease the effects of the blackout on Long Island. After extended negotiations with Connecticut, the cable was put into permanent use.

Shoreham Nuclear Pant at Dusk

In 2004, the Long Island Power Authority erected two 100-foot, 50 kW wind turbines at the Shoreham Energy Center site, as part of a renewable-energy program. At a ceremony, chairman Kessel stated, "We stand in the shadow of a modern-day Stonehenge, a multibillion-dollar monument to a failed energy policy, to formally commission the operation of a renewable energy technology that will harness the power of the wind for the benefit of Long Island's environment." The turbines generate 200 MWh per year, or 1/35,000th of the energy the nuclear plant would have produced.

Had the Shoreham Nuclear Power Station gone into operation as planned, it would have prevented the emission of an estimated three million tons of carbon dioxide per year, according to journalist Gwyneth Cravens.

On December 18, 2024 - LIPA approved plans to build a battery energy storage system that will be connected to the Shoreham substation. It is expected to be completed by 2028.

== Movies ==
- A scene from the 2012 movie The Dictator is filmed inside the Shoreham Nuclear Power Plant's control room.
- The case of the Shoreham Nuclear power plant is used as an example of a successful anti-nuclear campaign in the 2013 documentary Pandora's Promise, underlining the role of the Oil Heat Institute of Long Island in financing anti-nuclear pro-solar ads.

== See also ==
- Anti-nuclear movement in the United States
- Pro-nuclear movement
- Broadwater Energy
- Licensed to Kill? The Nuclear Regulatory Commission and the Shoreham Power Plant
- List of canceled nuclear plants in the United States
- Nuclear power in the United States
