= New York State Consumer Protection Board =

Government agency

The New York State Consumer Protection Board (CPB) is a former government agency of the State of New York that was responsible for protecting, educating and representing consumers. On March 31, 2011, Part A of Chapter 62 of the Laws of 2011 merged the CPB into the New York State Department of State (NYSDOS) creating a new Division of Consumer Protection.

== Organization ==
The three main divisions of the Consumer Protection Board were:

- Outreach and Program Development Bureau creates education programs and brochures for consumers about issues including credit card usage, home improvement, identity theft and Internet safety. The bureau's Consumer Assistance Unit handles over 20,000 complaints a year relating to consumer issues.
- Counsel, Policy and Research Bureau oversees the agency's legal functions, including enforcement of the state's Do not call law. In 2006, the Board added 1.3 million resident phone numbers to the United States National Do Not Call Registry and reached settlements with 58 telemarketers in response to consumer complaints, collecting over $350,000 in fines.
- Utility, Telecommunications and New Technologies Bureau represents consumers before the New York State Public Service Commission regarding utility performance and rate issues, and accepts complaints about the Long Island Power Authority.

== History ==
The CPB was established in 1970 under legislation signed by then-Governor Nelson Rockefeller. Betty Furness, a former Hollywood actress who had served as special assistant for consumer affairs to President Lyndon B. Johnson, was named as the Board's first chairman and executive director. Furness served in the position until July 1971, resigning after complaints about the lack of serious attention to her recommendations by the New York Legislature.

Richard Kessel served as Executive Director of the CPB from 1983 to 1995, where he negotiated rate freeze agreements with Consolidated Edison, Niagara Mohawk and other electric and telephone utilities, which Kessel estimated saved consumers $1 billion.

=== Merger ===
On March 31, 2011, Part A of Chapter 62 of the Laws of 2011 merged the former New York State Consumer Protection Board into the New York State Department of State creating a new Division of Consumer Protection. Consumers can find useful information, alerts and tools by visiting www.dos.ny.gov.
