= George D. Gould =

American financier and U.S. Treasury undersecretary (1927–2022)

Under Secretary of the Treasury for Domestic Finance
- Incumbent
- Assumed office May 1985 — November 1988
- President: Ronald Reagan

Personal details
- Born: George Sumner Bradford Dana Gould; May 22, 1927 Boston, Massachusetts, U.S.
- Died: April 26, 2022 (aged 94) Palm Beach, Florida, U.S.
- Occupation: Financier and banker

George Sumner Bradford Dana Gould (May 22, 1927 – April 26, 2022) was an American financier and banker. Gould was a member of the board of Municipal Assistance Corporation that was constituted during the 1975 New York City fiscal crisis and briefly served as its chairman in 1979. He was the Undersecretary of the Treasury in the late 1980s during the Reagan administration. During this period he oversaw the savings and loan crisis, the aftermath of the 1987 Black Monday stock market crash, and the raising of the country's debt ceiling.

== Early life ==
Gould was born in Boston, Massachusetts, on May 22, 1927, to Lillian Dana Sumner and Ernest Wellington Gould. His mother was related to Charles Sumner, a member of the United States Senate during the civil war era, while his father was an investor who focused on real estate and other commercial ventures. After Gould's mother died when he was five, he grew up with his two aunts. He studied at the Phillips Academy in Andover, Massachusetts, and then served in the army in the post-war years between 1945 and 1947. He was discharged as a second lieutenant.

Gould studied at Yale University, graduating with a degree in economics, and later earned an MBA from Harvard University in 1955.

== Career ==
Gould started his career as a wealth manager for philanthropist Jeremiah Milbank. In 1960, Gould joined Dan Lufkin, William Donaldson, and Richard Jenrette in the investment bank Donaldson, Lufkin & Jenrette (DLJ). He grew the firm's fund-management business and went on to head its securities division. He left DLJ in 1976 and led Madison Funds, a closed-end investment fund, that later invested in oil and gas companies.

=== New York fiscal crisis ===
In 1975, when New York City was in the midst of a fiscal crisis and was on the brink of bankruptcy, Gould was invited by the then mayor Abraham Beame and was appointed a board member of the Municipal Assistance Corporation (MAC). Beame famously reached out to Gould by telephone at 1 a.m. and had him join him for breakfast a few hours later before getting him to join the MAC. The group was tasked with managing the city's fiscal position and solvency, monitoring its spending and bond issuance. The New York Times described him as a "figure of calm" during the crisis. He was made the chairman of the board of the MAC in 1979, but, resigned in 1980 due to differences with the governor Hugh Carey. During this period, he was also appointed by New York state's governor as the chairman of the state's Housing Finance Agency.

=== Undersecretary of the Treasury ===
In 1985, Gould was appointed by the then U.S. president, Ronald Reagan, as the Undersecretary of the Treasury. During this period, he oversaw the government's handling of the savings and loan crisis, the aftermath of the 1987 Black Monday stock market crash, and the raising of the country's debt ceiling. As the undersecretary, he also oversaw US domestic banking regulation including the government's unsuccessful bid in the congress to allow commercial banks to underwrite securities.

High interest rates of the 1970s and early 1980s had resulted in savings and loans (S&L) associations seeing losses, resulting in the S&L crisis. Traditionally focused on home mortgage lending, S&Ls were allowed to make riskier lendings further aggravating their position. Regulators were looking to avoid a bailout, hoping that the S&Ls would be able to show some growth and emerge out of the crisis. Gould opposed a bailout that would result in the S&Ls continuing to operate without a clear understanding of their operating positions and the true extent of their losses.

In the aftermath of the 1987 stock market crash, he helped shape the administration's response, including injecting capital and liquidity into the banking system. He resigned from the position in 1988.

=== Later career ===
After stepping down from the treasury, Gould worked with Klingenstein Fields, a fund management firm. He was also a director at the home mortgage funding provider Freddie Mac and was part of the company's corporate governance committee in 2003, when he and other directors were dismissed due to an accounting scam at the company.

== Personal life ==
Gould was married to Darcy Mead Damgard. He had three earlier marriages, two of which had ended in divorces, while the third, Julie Echols Gould, predeceased him in 1983.

Gould died on April 26, 2022, at his home in Palm Beach, Florida. He was 94 years old.
