= Richard Kessel =

Power industry executive

President & CEO of the New York Power Authority
- In office October 14, 2008 – September 6, 2011
- Nominated by: David Paterson
- Governor: David Paterson; Andrew Cuomo
- Preceded by: Roger Kelley
- Succeeded by: Gil C. Quiniones

Personal details
- Party: Democratic

Richard M. Kessel (born c. 1950) is a power industry executive who was formerly President and chief executive officer of the New York Power Authority, the largest state-owned public utility company in the United States. Kessel started as a consumer advocate who led the opposition to the construction and operation of the Shoreham Nuclear Power Plant constructed by the Long Island Lighting Company (LILCO). He was appointed as chief executive and later chairman of the Long Island Power Authority (LIPA), which oversaw the public takeover of LILCO in 1998 and the decommissioning of the Shoreham plant. Kessel has been variously described by The New York Times as someone who started out as a "constant noodge, attacking perceived wrongs and demanding changes" who later became an "exuberant executive with a hands-on approach".

He served as the executive director of the New York State Consumer Protection Board from 1983 to 1995, where he negotiated rate freeze agreements with Consolidated Edison, Niagara Mohawk and other electric and telephone utilities, which Kessel estimated saved consumers $1 billion.

In 1989, Kessel was appointed by then-Governor Mario Cuomo to become the chairman of the Long Island Power Authority. He led the negotiations on the decommissioning of the Shoreham nuclear power plant, which had been constructed at a total cost of $5.5 billion and had never generated any commercial power. In February 1992, he handed over a $1 bill to purchase the Shoreham facility from the Long Island Lighting Company and oversaw its decommissioning and the shipment of its nuclear fuel off of Long Island. He left his spot as chairman in 1995 and remained as a trustee of LIPA, returning to the chairmanship in 1997 when he was reappointed by then-Governor George Pataki.

He was responsible for the LIPA's May 1998 takeover of LILCO, funded by a $7 billion offering in municipal bonds, then the largest sale of such bonds in the United States. Upon the takeover, LIPA cut rates for electricity by 20%, followed by refund checks of $101 to each Suffolk customer and $232 to each customer in Nassau and the portions of Queens served by LILCO.

He was able to achieve reductions in what had been some of the highest rates for electric power in the country.

In 2003, an audit by the New York State Controller criticized LIPA and Kessel for spending more than $45,000 to conduct improper political polls, and for paying more than $500,000 over 14 months to a single no-bid contracted employee.

Kessel was the target of an investigation by the New York State Office of the Inspector General for accepting separate salaries at LIPA for his roles as both chairman and president. In July 2008, the Inspector General ruled that he had not acted improperly, noting that he had been asked by Governor Pataki to stay on as chairman through 2006, that he had raised the issue that the Public Authorities Accountability Act prohibited him from being paid a salary as chairman and that he had received two written legal opinions that supported the position that a full-time chairman could be compensated.

On January 24, 2007, then-Governor Eliot Spitzer announced that Kevin Law would replace Kessel as Chairman of LIPA until the fall when a new chairman would be named and Law would become chief executive officer of LIPA.

In September 2008, Kessel was selected to become the President and chief executive officer of the New York Power Authority, which operated 18 power-generating facilities across New York State. Kessel succeeded Roger B. Kelley, who had been forced out by Governor David Paterson in June 2008, and took office on October 14, 2008.

While lauded for his frequent visits upstate, State Senators Joseph Griffo and George D. Maziarz have criticized Kessel's costly travel on the Power Authority's private plane. Griffo has called on the State Inspector General to investigate the propriety of Kessel's travel.

One of Kessel's first acts at the Power Authority was to remove or eliminate most of the positions that provided oversight of the Executive Offices. Throughout his tenure, and during a hiring freeze for state agencies, Kessel installed friends, neighbors, and political allies into positions throughout the Authority. Often, these positions were newly created or had been recently vacated at the urging of Kessel's staff. Several regional newspapers and websites made these events regular news fodder.

Kessel resigned from the New York Power Authority effective Sept. 6, 2011, an event facilitated by the election of Gov. Andrew M. Cuomo.

Kessel has been a resident of Merrick, in Nassau County, New York. He graduated with a bachelor's degree from New York University and was awarded a master's degree in political science at Columbia University. He has taught consumer issues at both Brooklyn College and Five Towns College.

In October 2023, Governor Kathy Hochul named Kessel Chair of the Nassau Interim Finance Authority.

== See also ==
- Jay Walder
- Christopher O. Ward
