= State of New York Municipal Bond Bank Agency =

The State of New York Municipal Bond Bank Agency (MBBA) was a New York State public-benefit corporation founded in 1972 by the state legislature to offer municipalities increased access to the bond market by creating an alternate method by which they could sell their general obligation bonds. MBBA was authorized to issue up to $1 billion of its bonds and to use the proceeds to buy bonds issued by municipalities. Following its creation there was insufficient interest by municipalities to use MBBA's financial services. In 1991 the cities of Buffalo and Rochester entered into agreements with MBBA to sell their bonds to MBBA in order to refund excess property taxes paid by residents of those cities. In 2017, it had operating expenses of $640,000, an outstanding debt of $402 million, and a staffing level of 269 people

It has been absorbed by New York State Homes and Community Renewal.

== See also ==
- Empire State Development Corporation
- New York State Housing Finance Agency
- State of New York Mortgage Agency
