= Empire State Development Corporation =

American public benefit umbrella organization

New York State Urban Development
- Empire State Development logo

Public authority overview
- Jurisdiction: New York
- Public authority executive: Hope Knight, President and CEO Designate
- Key document: New York State Urban Development Corporation Act
- Website: esd.ny.gov

Department of Economic Development
Department overview
- Jurisdiction: New York
- Headquarters: 625 Broadway, Albany, New York
- Department executive: commissioner
- Key document: Economic Development Law

Empire State Development (ESD) is the umbrella organization for New York's two principal economic development public-benefit corporations, the New York State Urban Development Corporation (UDC) and the New York Job Development Authority (JDA). The New York State Department of Economic Development (DED) is a department of the New York government that has been operationally merged into ESD.

ESD gives its mission as promoting the state economy, encouraging business investment and job creation, and supporting local economies through loans, grants, tax credits, real estate development, marketing and other forms of assistance.

== History ==
The Division of Commerce was created in 1941 and incorporated several state bureaus and the Bureau of Industry. It was replaced in 1944 by the Department of Commerce. The New York State Urban Development Corporation (UDC) was created in 1968 by the New York State Urban Development Corporation Act. On August 31, 1987, the Omnibus Economic Development Act created the state Department of Economic Development (DED). In 1975, the UDC was reorganized and its mission expanded from developing housing to economic development.

In 1995, the functions of the DED and the UDC were consolidated, along with the Job Development Authority (JDA) and the Science and Technology Foundation (STF). UDC's directors decided that the corporation would do business as the Empire State Development (ESD). Some functions of JDA and STF were folded into ESDC and DED, respectively, and the collective entity was branded as Empire State Development (ESD). In November 1999 the STF was abolished, and in 2011 the New York State Foundation for Science, Technology and Innovation (NYSTAR) was merged with DED.

In its early years the UDC was responsible for "the last significant program of publicly assisted housing in the United States". At the time it was primarily aimed at urban renewal in New York City, although its bonds were to be used statewide. Virtually all state subsidized housing built since 1968 was financed through the corporation. In the first years of the UDC, its aim was to facilitate large-scale low-income housing developments in urban neighborhoods that had traditionally been white and middle-class. In 1970, Business Week claimed that the UDC was "emerging as the most powerful state agency in the country for coping with urban growth."

By 1974 the investment climate had cooled and in 1975 Governor Hugh Carey asked the Legislature to appropriate $178 million for the UDC, and by 1977 the UDC was able to reenter the financial markets. In 1975, the corporation was reorganized and its mission expanded from developing housing to economic development. The finances were reorganized and the corporation assumed a less aggressive development stance, and its mission was refocused to finance other ambitious state projects and has been used frequently by governors to implement projects that circumvent formal Legislative or voter scrutiny.

The move away from a housing mission began in the late 1970s and early 1980s with such projects as the Jacob K. Javits Convention Center and improvements to the Apollo Theater. Among its projects was a doubling of the New York state prison system, improvements to Love Canal, construction of the Jacob K. Javits Convention Center, revitalization of 42nd Street (Manhattan), revitalization of Niagara Falls, New York, construction of Battery Park City, development of Roosevelt Island, as well as planning for construction of a new Pennsylvania Station and for development of Governors Island. While the UDC ultimately was to have big successes with such projects as Roosevelt Island and Battery Park City it was to encounter major problems in its inner city developments and its efforts to build minority low-income housing in white middle-class neighborhoods. The Corporation still maintains a housing portfolio that currently includes mortgages for 20,200 housing units valued at $650 million in total.

Mario Cuomo was the first to begin ambitious use of it to get around official scrutiny for public projects. In 1981 voters voted against a $500 million bond issue for expansion of the state prison system to handle increased prison populations arising from the Rockefeller drug laws. At the time New York had 32 adult prisons. Cuomo was to use the bonds to build another 38 prisons — most upstate.

George Pataki used the corporation to distribute $20 billion in federal aid following the September 11, 2001 attacks to help rebuild lower Manhattan and build the 9/11 memorial. A subsidiary, Lower Manhattan Development Corporation, and the World Trade Center Memorial Foundation were set up for those purposes. Rebuilding was financed by Liberty bonds. Whether the lack of public scrutiny has helped or hurt the development process can be debated.

An audit released in May 2006 by New York comptroller Alan Hevesi reported that the Corporation loses track of its subsidiaries. At the time the corporation reported 70 active subsidiaries, but the audit showed there were 202 subsidiaries still legally on the books (98 of which were definitely inactive). The audit did not consider this a serious oversight but the corporation stated that it intended to dissolve the inactive corporations.

In 2007, under Governor Eliot Spitzer, an Upstate ESD headquarters opened in Buffalo in recognition of the different economic challenges posed in the upper and lower (NYC region) parts of the State. Two chairs were appointed, one for ESD Downstate and the other for ESD Upstate. The ESD board also authorized the creation of another subsidiary, Upstate Empire State Development Corporation, to concentrate on Upstate issues. In 2008, Governor David A. Paterson brought the two components of ESD back together again, emphasizing that New York is truly "One State". The former Upstate and Downstate offices now work together to ensure that New York's economic development strategy benefits the entire State, while being mindful of the specific resources and special challenges of each region.

In January 2011, Governor Andrew M. Cuomo appointed Kenneth Adams as ESD President & CEO and DED Commissioner. Mr. Adams was confirmed by the Legislature on April 5, 2011. In May 2011, Governor Cuomo appointed Julie Shimer as Chair of ESD. She was confirmed by the New York State Senate in June 2011.

State control over projects in New York City has often involved turf conflicts between the New York City mayor and the governor (including the fact that the state authority is exempted from city zoning rules). Many of the projects have had significant impacts on neighborhoods and resulted in white flight and charges of reverse discrimination. As an example, the UDC's construction of the Harlem State Office Building in 1969 aroused intense opposition from the neighborhood which wanted the resources applied in other ways. Ada Louise Huxtable called the fight "Rockefeller's Vietnam". The term "urban development" took on a negative connotation and in 1995 UDC was renamed the Empire State Development.

During the coronavirus pandemic, ESD was accorded a leading role in delineating what businesses would be considered essential in New York State. In a late 2020 per curiam decision of the Supreme Court, Roman Catholic Diocese of Brooklyn v. Cuomo, ESD categorizations of essential services were noted for excluding religious services while, at the same time, not being limited to services which can be considered as essential. Avi Schick, former President of ESDC (2007–2009), criticized the corporation as acting beyond its purview in determining what constitutes essential activities, particularly as it relates to religious practice.

== Structure ==
Since 1995, four entities have been operationally merged and referred to as Empire State Development (ESD):

- Urban Development Corporation (UDC), d/b/a Empire State Development (ESD)
  - In 2017, the UDC had operating expenses of $1.282 billion, an outstanding debt of $12.895 billion, and a staffing level of 351 people.
- Department of Economic Development (DED)
- New York Job Development Authority (JDA), d/b/a Empire State Development (ESD)
  - In 2017, the JDA had operating expenses of $2.96 million, an outstanding debt of $10.068 billion, and a staffing level of 4 people.
- Science and Technology Foundation (STF)

Although ESD officials have programmatically consolidated the DED, UDC, JDA and STF, they have not legally consolidated the agencies. The commissioner of the DED is the chairman of the boards of UDC, JDA and STF, but those boards continue to operate as separate bodies.

The UDC is allowed to operate through subsidiaries. Each subsidiary has its own board of directors. As of October 2015, there were nine subsidiaries of ESD:. ESD also has more than 120 inactive subsidiaries such as the Archive Preservation Corporation and the Governors Island Redevelopment Corporation. These subsidiaries are legal entities but are no longer used and have not been legally dissolved.

- Atlantic Yards Community Development Corporation (AYCDC)
- Brooklyn Bridge Park Development Corporation (BBPDC)
- Convention Center Development Corporation (CCDC)
- Erie Canal Harbor Development Corporation (ECHDC)
- Harlem Community Development Corporation (HCDC)
- Lower Manhattan Development Corporation (LMDC)
- Moynihan Station Development Corporation (MSDC)
- Queens West Development Corporation (QWDC)
- USA Niagara Development Corporation (USAN)

The New York State Foundation for Science, Technology and Innovation is also listed on the New York State Comptroller's website as a public benefit corporation that carries out functions that were formerly performed by NYSTAR. NYSTAR is now listed on the ESD website. The New York State Foundation for Science, Technology, and Innovation and NYSTAR are not listed in the 2018 New York State Authorities Budget Office report and so both might be dissolved or chose not to report.

== Operations ==
The UDC is empowered to issue bonds and notes, grant loans and tax exemptions, acquire private property, exercise eminent domain, create subsidiaries, and exempt projects from/override local laws, ordinances, codes, charters or regulations (e.g., zoning). As with all New York state public-benefit corporations, it can issue bonds without a voter referendum, bypassing the NY's state constitution limits. As of May 2015 the UDC reported outstanding debts of $11 billion.

As of October 2015, major projects included the:

- Atlantic Yards Project
- Aqueduct Race Track Civic Project
- Belmont Park Redevelopment Study
- Buffalo Billion
- City-by-City Projects
- Columbia Manhattanville Project
- Midtown Rising
- Radisson Community
- Victoria Theater Redevelopment

A procurement opportunities newsletter, The New York State Contract Reporter, contains notices of procurement contract opportunities and is published by the Department of Economic Development.

== See also ==
- Dormitory Authority of the State of New York
- I ❤ NY
- New York Local Government Assistance Corporation
- New York State Environmental Facilities Corporation
- New York State Housing Finance Agency
- Municipal Assistance Corporation
- State University Construction Fund
