= New York State Authorities Budget Office =

The New York State Authorities Budget Office (ABO) is an independent office in the state of New York established by the Public Authorities Accountability Act of 2005 and signed into law by Governor Pataki in 2006. In 2009, the ABO was restructured as part of the Public Authorities Reform Act.

The ABO's mission is to make New York State public-benefit corporations more accountable and transparent. The ABO receives assistance from the New York State Department of State. Its powers and duties include:

- Collecting, analyzing and disseminating organizational, operational, performance and financial information on public authorities for the purpose of making this information available to the public.
- Making recommendations to the Governor and the Legislature on debt, compensation, procurement practices, property transactions, structure and mission, and other issues related to improving the performance and transparency of public authorities.

Joshua Norkin is the director of the ABO.

== Annual report ==
It publishes an annual report, available on its website, detailing the financial and operational situation of each state authority, IDA, and local authority in the State of New York.

== See also ==
- New York State Comptroller
- New York State Financial Control Board
- New York State Public Authorities Control Board
