= New York state public-benefit corporations =

Type of corporation-like entity

- Type: Public-benefit corporations
- Legal status: Quasi-public corporations under New York law
- Region served: New York State
- Members: 47 state authorities; 531 local authorities (As of 2018)
- Parent organization: State of New York and local governments

New York state public-benefit corporations and authorities operate like quasi-private corporations, with boards of directors appointed by elected officials, overseeing both publicly operated and privately operated systems. Public-benefit nonprofit corporations share characteristics with government agencies, but they are exempt from many state and local regulations. Of particular importance, they can issue their own debt, allowing them to bypass limits on state-funded debt contained in the New York State Constitution. This allows public authorities to make potentially risky capital and infrastructure investments without directly putting the credit of New York State or its municipalities on the line. As a result, public authorities have become widely used for financing public works; more than 95 percent of all state-funded debt outstanding in New York has been issued by public authorities without voter approval.

The growing influence of public authorities over state and local financing, coupled with their ability to avoid regulations applicable to government agencies, has led to calls for reform. Some reforms were passed in the Public Authorities Accountability Act of 2005. The New York State Authorities Budget Office, in their 2018 annual report, noted that there were 47 state authorities and 531 local authorities, including 109 IDAs and 292 not-for-profit corporations created locally, that they provided oversight for in New York State. According to this same ABO report, the operating expenses in 2017 for the 47 state authorities was $34.82 billion. Additionally, the 47 state authorities carried a total of $160.4 billion in outstanding debt.

== Origins ==
Public benefit corporations in New York State have origins in mercantile capitalism. A shared tradition of English common law and Dutch law may explain their origins.

The New York Court of Appeals provided a thorough history of state laws regarding public authorities in the 1994 case Schulz v. State, 84 N.Y.2d 231. As the court explained, state debt limits were first enacted as a reaction to fiscal crises caused by the state's lending of its credit to "irresponsible" canal and railroad corporations in the early nineteenth century. The state was forced to assume these obligations, which amounted to more than three-fifths of the state's entire debt. In 1846, a referendum requirement was added to the state constitution, prohibiting the state from contracting long term debt without approval by the voters.

As early as 1851, the legislature began to search for ways to evade the constitutional debt limit in order to finance public works projects. Canal certificates, which would be repaid through canal revenues, and which by their terms were not state obligations, were nevertheless held to be unconstitutional in Newell v. People, 7 N.Y. 9 (1852). The court held that the state had a moral obligation to repay the debts if canal revenues proved insufficient, and thus the certificates were deemed "an evasion if not a direct violation of the constitution".

In 1921, the legislature chartered the first state public authority, the Port of New York Authority, as a new vehicle for financing public projects while insulating the state from long term debt obligations. In 1926, the Court of Appeals held in Williamsburgh Savings Bank v. State, 243 N.Y. 231, that the state could disclaim any moral obligation for public authority debts. However, amendments to the 1938 Constitution overruled this case and completely disclaimed the state's responsibility for any public authority debt.

The widespread use of public authorities in New York State was pioneered by Robert Moses in the 1930s and 40s. Much of Moses' power base resulted from his tight control of the Triborough Bridge Authority, which allowed him to earmark revenues from tolls on the bridge for other projects in New York City and around the state. He also served as president of the Jones Beach Parkway Authority (1933–1963), president of the Bethpage State Park Authority (1933–1963), and chairman of the New York Power Authority (1954–1962). Moses, through his control of these authorities, was able to build some of New York's most important public works projects, including the Cross Bronx Expressway, the Brooklyn-Queens Expressway, and various bridges and parkways. The public authority model allowed Moses to bypass many of the legal restrictions placed on state agencies, allowing him to expedite development but also allowing him to hide project financing, contracting and operational information from public scrutiny. Because of this, he has been criticized for wasteful spending, patronage, and refusing to consider public opposition to his projects.

The 1938 constitutional amendments attempted to limit the proliferation of public authorities by specifying that they could be created only by special act of the state legislature. By 1956, 53 public authorities had been created. In 1990, the Commission on Government Integrity concluded that "At present, so far as Commission staff has been able to determine, no one has even an approximate count of how many of these organizations exist, where they are, much less an accounting of what they do." By 2004, the Office of the State Comptroller had identified at least 640 state and local authorities. The current count stands at 1,098.

Some of the most well known major public benefit corporations in New York State include the Port Authority of New York and New Jersey (actually a bi-state authority created by interstate compact), the Metropolitan Transportation Authority, and the Empire State Development Corporation. New York has hundreds of lesser-known public benefit corporations, including industrial development agencies and local development corporations.

The Public Authorities Accountability Act of 2005 created the Authority Budget Office in order "to provide the governor and the legislator with conclusions and opinions concerning the performance of public authorities and to study, review and report on the operations, practices and finances of public authorities...." The ABO is intended to promote transparency and accountability and to improve authority governance.

== Incorporation and dissolution ==
The New York State Constitution, Art. X, sec. 5, provides that public benefit corporations may only be created by special act of the legislature. In City of Rye v. MTA, 24 N.Y.2d 627 (1969), the court of appeals explained that "The debates of the 1938 Convention indicate that the proliferation of public authorities after 1927 was the reason for the enactment of section 5 of article X.... Abbott Low Moffat, who supported this proposal, told the convention that its purpose was 'to require the Legislature to pass directly itself upon the establishment of each new authority, and to prevent the enactment of general laws pursuant to which a municipal corporation can itself create a corporation of the authority type'".

While major public authorities can only be created by special legislation, many local development corporations have been created under the general Not-For-Profit Corporation Law. These LDCs function in much the same way as other public benefit corporations and public authorities, but do not need to be established by specific state legislation. Additionally, many public authorities have the power to create subsidiary authorities without additional legislative authorization. An example is the Empire State Development Corporation, which decided in 2007 to dissolve 13 subsidiaries and merge 25 others into a single holding company. ESDC still encompasses many subsidiary organizations.

== Public authority financing ==
The 1938 Constitution "expressly empowered public authorities to contract debt independently of the State". Because of this, the Court of Appeals has repeatedly affirmed that public authorities are distinct from the state and that the state carries no moral obligation to repay their debts. Although the Constitution prohibits the state from lending its credit to public authorities, it does allow the state to make gifts of money to authorities. As a practical result, this has resulted in some authorities receiving annual funding from the state on a consistent basis. The Court of Appeals stated in Schulz v. State, 84 N.Y.2d 231 (1994) that, if "modern ingenuity, even gimmickry, have in fact stretched the words of the Constitution beyond the point of prudence, that plea for reform in State borrowing practices and policy is appropriately directed to the public arena". See also Wein v. State, 39 N.Y.2d 136 (1976); Wein v. Levitt, 42 N.Y.2d 300 (1977).

Financing public projects through public authorities is also attractive because their independent corporate structure theoretically makes them more flexible and efficient than state agencies. Many restrictions placed on state agencies do not apply to public authorities, including, for example, general public bidding requirements (some public bidding requirements do apply under the Public Authorities Law). See Plumbing, Heating, Piping & Air Conditioning Contr. Ass'n v. N.Y.S. Thruway Auth., 5 N.Y.2d 420 (1959). Most public authorities may also make contracts, and because of public authorities' corporate status, there is generally, no remedy against the state for the breach of such contracts. John Grace & Co. v. State University Constr. Fund, 44 N.Y.2d 84 (1978). Many public authorities, such as industrial development agencies and the Empire State Development Corporation, can also condemn property.

The New York State Public Authorities Control Board was created in 1976 to provide oversight for some of the state's most powerful authorities. Sections 50 and 51 of the Public Authorities Law currently require 11 authorities to receive approval from the PACB prior to entering into contracts for project-related financing. There are five members on the PACB board, all of whom are appointed by the governor and serve year-long terms.

Public authorities are currently responsible for more than 90% of the state's debt and 80% of the state's infrastructure, leading some to refer to them as the "shadow government".

== Public authority governance ==
Public benefit corporations and public authorities are controlled by boards of directors made up of political appointees. Board members have fixed terms and are, at least in theory, considered to be more independent of political influence than elected politicians and appointed agency heads.

Board members and employees of public authorities usually are not considered to be state employees, but are rather employees of the authority. Ciulla v. State, 77 N.Y.S.2d 545 (N.Y. Ct. Cl. 1948). However, public authority employees are covered by the ethics regulations included in section 74 of the Public Officers Law, and the Public Authorities Accountability Act of 2005 imposed additional ethics requirements on board members of some public authorities. Authority board members are required to attend training sessions on ethics and governance issues.

== Types of public authorities ==
The New York State Comptroller's Office lists four types of public benefit corporations and authorities:

- Class A — these authorities and public benefit corporations have regional or statewide significance
- Class B — according to the Comptroller's office, these "[e]ntities affiliated [are] with a State agency, or entities created by the State that have limited jurisdiction but a majority of Board appointments made by the Governor or other State officials; entities that would not exist but for their relationship with the State".
- Class C — these public authorities have local application.
- Class D — these authorities and public benefit corporations have interstate or international jurisdiction.

== List of New York state public-benefit corporations ==
For a more complete list, see a list of New York State public-benefit corporations

=== Class A public benefit corporations in the New York City Metropolitan Area ===
Some of the authorities operating in and around the New York City metropolitan area:

==== Battery Park City Authority ====
Fully titled the Hugh L. Carey Battery Park City Authority, according to its official website, the authority is:

a New York State public benefit corporation whose mission is to plan, create, co-ordinate and maintain a balanced community of commercial, residential, retail, and park space within its designated 92-acre site on the southern tip of Manhattan.

==== Long Island Power Authority ====
The Long Island Power Authority or LIPA ["lie-pah"], a municipal subdivision of the State of New York, was created under the Long Island Power Act of 1985 to acquire the Long Island Lighting Company (LILCO)'s assets and securities. A second Long Island Power Authority (LIPA), a wholly owned subsidiary of the first, acquired LILCO's transmission and distribution system in June 1998.

==== Lower Manhattan Development Corporation ====
The Lower Manhattan Development Corporation (LMDC) was formed after the September 11 attacks to plan the reconstruction of Lower Manhattan. It was founded by Governor George Pataki and then-Mayor Rudolph Giuliani. The LMDC is a joint State-City corporation governed by a 16-member Board of Directors, half appointed by the Governor of New York and half by the Mayor of New York City.

The development corporation is a subsidiary of the Empire State Development Corporation.

==== Metropolitan Transportation Authority ====
The Metropolitan Transportation Authority manages public transportation in the New York metropolitan area (this includes the New York City Subway and MTA Regional Bus Operations systems, as well as the Long Island Rail Road and the Metro-North Railroad).

The MTA includes the following subsidiaries:

- Excess Loss Trust Fund
- First Mutual Transportation Assurance Company
- MTA Capital Construction Company
- MTA Capital Program Review Board
- Long Island Rail Road Company
- Metro-North Commuter Rail Road Company
- New York City Transit Authority & Manhattan & Bronx Surface Transit Operating Authority
- Staten Island Rapid Transit Operating Authority
- Triborough Bridge and Tunnel Authority — once a fiefdom of Robert Moses, it had performed, as an independent entity, the collection of tolls and the maintenance of the Triborough Bridge. It operates all intrastate toll bridges and tunnels in New York City, and is a subsidiary of the Metropolitan Transportation Authority.

==== New York City Economic Development Corporation ====
The New York City Economic Development Corporation was founded in 1966 as the New York City Public Development Corporation. It is New York City's official economic development corporation.

==== Overcoat Development Corporation ====
The Overcoat Development Corporation was founded in the 1980s in an attempt to convince a men's outerwear company to relocate to New York from Indiana by offering a favorable lease on a building in Amsterdam, New York. This company closed down, but the Overcoat Development Corporation continues to exist to service the long-term lease it signed.

==== Roosevelt Island Operating Corporation ====
The Roosevelt Island Operating Corporation's responsibility is to develop Roosevelt Island, a small strip of land in the East River that is part of the borough of Manhattan.

=== Class A public benefit corporations in Greater New York State ===
Some of the public benefit corporations outside of New York City's metropolitan area, or serving the entire state, are listed below.

==== Agriculture and New York State Horse Breeding Development Fund ====
The Agriculture and New York State Horse Breeding Development Fund serves equine interests in New York State and provides education concerning certain agricultural development.

A 2004 audit of the fund found problems with its management.

==== Dormitory Authority of the State of New York ====
The Dormitory Authority of the State of New York (DASNY) provides construction, financing, and allied services that serve the public good, to benefit specifically universities, health care facilities, and court facilities.

==== Empire State Development ====
The Empire State Development, also known as the Urban Development Corporation, maintains various programs and subsidiaries to encourage economic development in New York State.

==== Natural Heritage Trust ====
The Natural Heritage Trust supports natural resource conservation and historic preservation within New York State through the reception and administration of donations and grants. It partners with several state agencies, including the New York State Office of Parks, Recreation and Historic Preservation, New York State Department of Environmental Conservation, and the New York State Department of State; partners also include other public and private entities. The trust was established in 1968. In 2017, it had operating expenses of $1.54 million and a staff of 76 people. Its staffing compensation exceeded its operating expenses in 2017 by almost $1.5 million in the 2018 New York State Authorities Budget Office report.

==== New York State Thruway Authority ====
The New York State Thruway Authority maintains the New York State Thruway, a system of limited-access highways within New York State.

==== New York State Environmental Facilities Corporation ====
The New York State Environmental Facilities Corporation (EFC) provides low-cost capital, grants, and expert technical assistance for environmental projects in New York State. The EFC has issued more than $13 billion in both tax-exempt and taxable revenue bonds. In 2017, the EFC had operating expenses of $442.35 million, an outstanding debt of $5.917 billion, and 115 employees. The EFC's 2009-2010 budget was in excess of $500 million. The statutory basis for substantially all EFC activity stems from Title 12 of Article 5 of the NYS Public Authorities Law (also called the "EFC Act") in 1970.

==== Capital District Transportation Authority ====
The Capital District Transportation Authority (CDTA) is a public benefit organization which provides transportation services to the Capital District of New York State (Albany, Schenectady, and Rensselaer counties plus part of Saratoga). The function of CDTA is to operate public transportation as well as to operate the Amtrak stations in the service area (Albany-Rennselaer, Schenectady, and Saratoga Springs).

It includes the following subsidies:

- Access Transit Services
- Capital District Transit System
- Capital District Transit System, Number 1
- Capital District Transit System, Number 2
- CTDA Facilities, Inc.

==== Central New York Regional Transportation Authority ====
The Central New York Regional Transportation Authority manages most public transportation in four Central New York counties - Onondaga, Oneida, Oswego and Cayuga. This includes bus service serving the cities of Syracuse, Utica, Rome, Oswego and Auburn. The CNYRTA includes the following subsidiaries:

- CNY Centro, Inc.
- Centro of Cayuga
- Centro of Oswego
- Centro of Oneida
- Call-A-Bus Paratransit Services (operates demand-responsive paratransit service in Onondaga County)
- Centro Parking (operates two state-owned parking garages and various surface lots in the city of Syracuse)
- ITC, Inc. (operates the William F. Walsh Regional Transportation Center in Syracuse)

==== New York State Bridge Authority ====
The New York State Bridge Authority owns and operates five bridges on the Hudson River.

==== Olympic Regional Development Authority ====
The Olympic Regional Development Authority was designed to administer and manage the Whiteface Mountain Ski Center and the other Winter Olympic venues used during the Lake Placid 1980 Winter Olympics.

==== New York Power Authority ====
The New York Power Authority provides electricity throughout New York State.

===== New York State Canal Corporation =====
The New York State Canal Corporation is a subsidiary of the New York Power Authority (it was a subsidiary of the Thruway Authority before 2017). It is responsible for the oversight, administration and maintenance of the New York State Canal System, which consists of the Erie Canal, Cayuga-Seneca Canal, Oswego Canal and Champlain Canal. It is also involved with the development and maintenance of the New York State Canalway Trail and with the general development and promotion of the Erie Canal Corridor as both a tourist attraction and a working waterway.

==== Rochester-Genesee Regional Transportation Authority ====
The Rochester-Genesee Regional Transportation Authority consists of numerous subsidiaries, including:

- Batavia Bus Service, Inc.
- Genesee Transportation Service Council Staff, Inc.
- Lift Line, Inc.
- Livingston Area Transportation Service, Inc.
- Orleans Area Transit System, Inc.
- Regional Transit System, Inc.
- Renaissance Square Corp.
- RGRTA Maritime Development Corporation
- Seneca Transport Systems, Inc.
- Wayne Area Transportation Service, Inc.
- Wyoming Transportation Service, Inc.

==== Roswell Park Cancer Institute Corporation ====
The Roswell Park Cancer Institute Corporation operates Roswell Park Comprehensive Cancer Center in Buffalo, New York.

==== United Nations Development Corporation ====
The United Nations Development Corporation was designed to assist the United Nations with its real estate and development needs.

==== Healthcare ====
There are public benefit corporations that oversee the operations of Erie County Medical Center in Buffalo (Erie County Medical Center Corporation), Nassau University Medical Center in East Meadow (Nassau Health Care Corporation), and Westchester Medical Center in Valhalla (Westchester County Health Care Corporation).

=== Class B public authorities ===
- Adirondack Park Institute
- New York Racing Association

=== Class C public authorities ===
Class C public authorities have local jurisdiction and very few are of significance outside of economic development within towns, villages, and small cities.

==== New York City School Construction Authority (SCA) ====
The New York City School Construction Authority's mission is to design and construct public schools for children throughout New York City.

=== Class D public authorities ===
Class D public authorities have interstate and international jurisdiction. This is the complete list.

- Buffalo and Fort Erie Public Bridge Authority — an international authority that maintains the Peace Bridge link between Buffalo, New York, and Fort Erie, Ontario.
- Niagara Falls Bridge Commission — international public authority controlling various bridges in the Niagara Falls. The Board of Commissioners has eight members, four appointed by the Ontario Premier and four by the Governor of New York State.
- Port Authority of New York and New Jersey — bi-state agency regulates interstate commerce around the ports of New York and New Jersey; owns bridge and tunnel connections between the two states south of the Gov. Mario Cuomo Bridge (formerly known as the Tappan Zee Bridge); maintains New York City's airports and Newark International Airport; built the World Trade Center; includes the following subsidiaries:
  - New York and New Jersey Railroad Corporation (operates the Port Authority Trans-Hudson commuter railroad system)
  - Newark Legal and Communications Center Urban Renewal Corporation
  - Port Authority Trans-Hudson Corporation Transitcenter, Inc.
  - WTC Retail LLC

== Controversy ==
Some of these corporations, particularly the "authorities", are criticized as being wasteful or overly secretive. There were more than 640 as of 2004 according to a New York Times editorial. Some attempts at reform have been made. According to the editorial:

[New York State Comptroller Alan] Hevesi has offered a comprehensive bill that incorporates some of the best ideas in other legislation circulating in Albany [to reform the authorities]. It would also create a commission to assess whether all 640 authorities set up over the last 80 years still need to exist. The Overcoat Protection Authority, for one, would seem to have had its day.

The Overcoat Protection Authority actually is not the correct name of the entity in question. The correct name of the entity the Times was speaking of is the Overcoat Development Corporation, which was designed to lure a clothing manufacturer to New York from Indiana in the 1980s.

Lack of oversight is a major concern with New York's authorities. According to the Associated Press:

Out of 643 state and local authorities in New York, only 11 need approval by the Public Authorities Control Board before selling bonds. The comptroller's office gets financial reports from just 53.

In 2004, the New York State Comptroller's Office, headed at the time by Alan Hevesi, became concerned about the debt public authorities were generating:

Most public authorities have the ability to borrow funds by issuing debt. Total public authority debt reached more than $120.4 billion in 2004, and continues to grow. $37 billion of this debt is State-supported, accounting for more than 90 percent of total outstanding State-supported debt.

== See also ==
- New York's political subdivisions are considered municipal corporations. This includes counties, towns, villages, and cities.
- List of New York City lists
